= Sporting Hill, Pennsylvania =

Unincorporated community in Pennsylvania, U.S.

Coordinates: 40°14′10″N 76°58′19″W

Sporting Hill is an unincorporated community in Hampden Township, Cumberland County, Pennsylvania, United States. It is bordered on the north and south by the Conodoguinet Creek and the Capital Beltway (11/581) respectively. Carlisle Pike (the old Route 11 and the main east-west route through Sporting Hill) and the Beltway interchange a short distance west of the village, which has multiple retail stores and restaurants, including in the Hampden Town Centre. Sporting Hill is served by the Mechanicsburg post office with the zip code of 17050. On June 30, 1863 the northernmost pitched battle of the American Civil War occurred there at the Skirmish of Sporting Hill during the Gettysburg campaign.
