= Camp Hill, Pennsylvania =

Borough in Pennsylvania, US

Camp Hill
- Borough
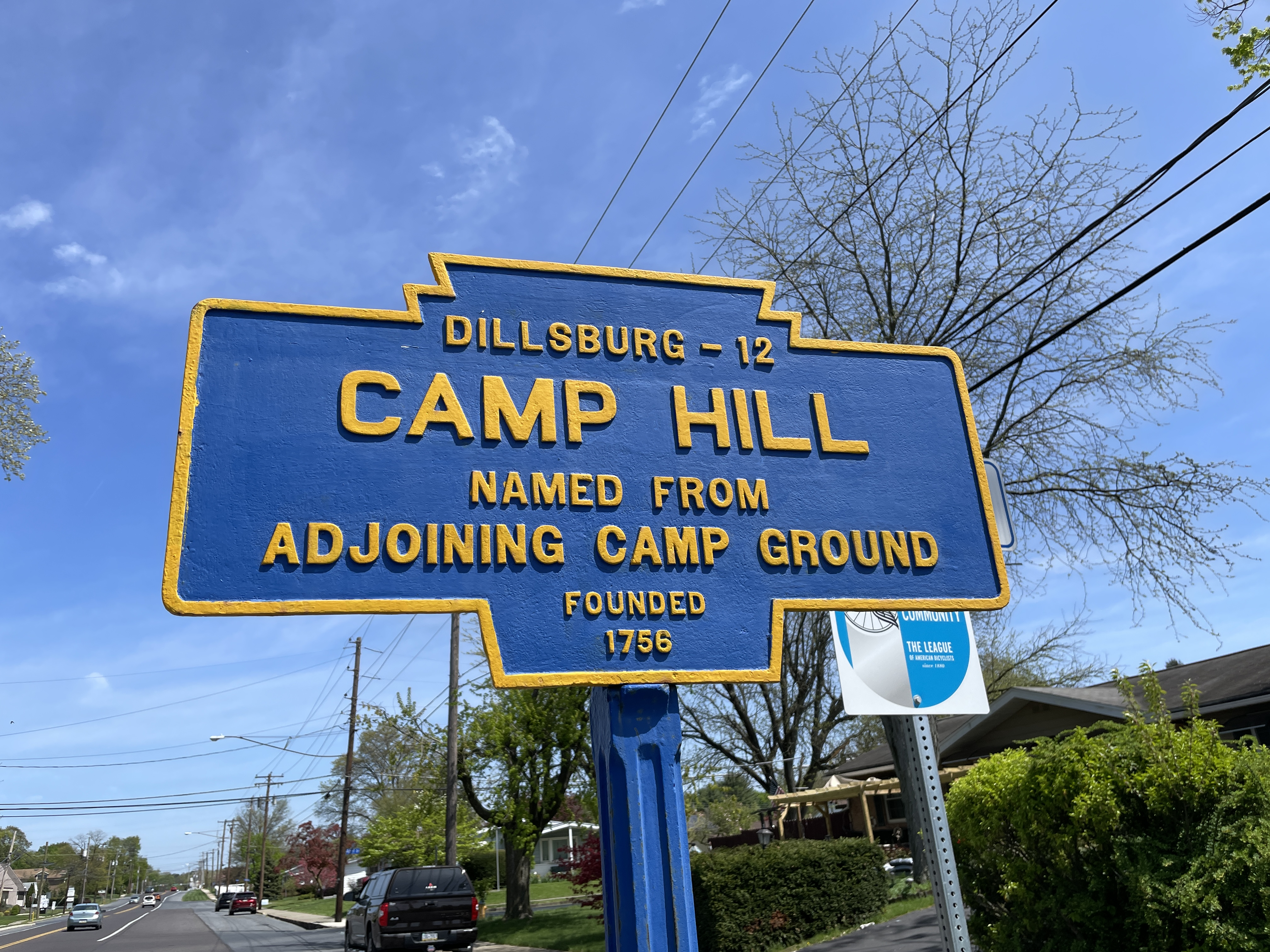
- Keystone marker for Camp Hill on PA 641

- Location of Camp Hill in Cumberland County, Pennsylvania.

- Location in Pennsylvania and the United States Camp Hill (the United States)
- Coordinates: 40°14′28″N 76°55′34″W
- Country: United States
- State: Pennsylvania
- County: Cumberland
- Settled: 1735
- Incorporated: 1885

Government
  - Type: Borough Council
  - Mayor: Mark Simpson
  - Council President: Alissa Packer

Area
  - Total: 2.12 sq mi (5.50 km^{2})
  - Land: 2.12 sq mi (5.50 km^{2})
  - Water: 0 sq mi (0.00 km^{2})
- Elevation: 423 ft (129 m)

Population (2020)
  - Total: 8,130
- Time zone: UTC-5 (Eastern (EST))
  - Summer (DST): UTC-4 (EDT)
- ZIP Code: 17011
- Area codes: 717 and 223
- FIPS code: 42-11000
- Website: www.camphillborough.com

Camp Hill is a borough in Cumberland County, Pennsylvania, United States. It is 3 miles (5 km) southwest of Harrisburg and is part of the Harrisburg–Carlisle metropolitan statistical area. The population was 8,130 at the 2020 census. There are many large corporations based in nearby East Pennsboro Township and Wormleysburg that use the Camp Hill postal address, including the Harsco Corporation and until 2022 the Rite Aid Corporation.

== Geography ==
Camp Hill is located in eastern Cumberland County at 40°14′28″N 76°55′34″W (40.241089, -76.926202). It is bordered to the east by the borough of Lemoyne, to the south by the Lower Allen census-designated place within Lower Allen Township, to the west by Hampden Township, and to the north by East Pennsboro Township.

U.S. Routes 11 and 15 run through the western and northern sides of the borough, while Pennsylvania Route 581, the Capital Beltway, passes through the southern side, intersecting US 11/15 at Exits 5A/5B. Downtown Harrisburg, the state capital, is 3 miles (5 km) northeast of the center of Camp Hill, via either the Market Street Bridge or the M. Harvey Taylor Bridge across the Susquehanna River.

According to the U.S. Census Bureau, Camp Hill has a total area of 2.1 square miles (5.5 km^{2}), all land. It has a hot-summer humid continental climate (Dfa) with monthly averages ranging from 29.9 °F in January to 74.8 °F in July. The local hardiness zone is 7a.

== Demographics ==
Historical population
Census	Pop.	Note	%±
1880	467		—
1890	191		−59.1%
1900	360		88.5%
1910	874		142.8%
1920	1,636		87.2%
1930	3,111		90.2%
1940	3,630		16.7%
1950	5,934		63.5%
1960	8,559		44.2%
1970	9,931		16.0%
1980	8,422		−15.2%
1990	7,831		−7.0%
2000	7,636		−2.5%
2010	7,888		3.3%
2020	8,130		3.1%

At the 2000 census, there were 7,636 people, 3,387 households and 2,157 families residing in the borough. The population density was 3,552 inhabitants per square mile (1,371/km^{2}). There were 3,529 housing units at an average density of 1,641.5 units per square mile (633.8 units/km^{2}). The racial makeup of the borough was 96.08% White, 2.25% Asian, 0.35% African American, 0.16% Native American, 0.01% Pacific Islander, 0.25% from other races, and 0.89% from two or more races. Hispanic or Latino of any race were 1.09% of the population.

There were 3,387 households, of which 25.8% had children under the age of 18 living with them, 53.5% were married couples living together, 7.7% had a female householder with no husband present, and 36.3% were non-families. 32.2% of all households were made up of individuals, and 15.4% had someone living alone who was 65 years of age or older. The average household size was 2.21 and the average family size was 2.80.

21.3% of the population were under the age of 18, 4.5% from 18 to 24, 26.4% from 25 to 44, 25.0% from 45 to 64, and 22.7% who were 65 years of age or older. The median age was 43 years. For every 100 females, there were 88.5 males. For every 100 females age 18 and over, there were 83.5 males.

The median household income was $50,774 and the median family income was $61,578. Males had a median income of $48,625, and $32,357 for females. The per capita income for the borough was $28,256. About 3.6% of families and 3.7% of the population were below the poverty line, including 5.5% of those under age 18 and 4.4% of those age 65 or over.

== History ==
Camp Hill was previously referred to by several names, including Hendricks, Fort Pleasant, Oysters Point, Bowmanstown, and White Hall. The name "Camp Hill" is believed to have originated from a split in the congregation of the Peace Church, located west of the current borough. One faction of the church, led by John Winebrenner, began meeting outdoors on a hill, leading to the area being referred to as "Camp Hill." Dr. John D. Bowman, the first postmaster of the village, officially gave it the name Camp Hill in 1869.

Prior to the Civil War, the area was known locally as White Hill, and was a stop along the Cumberland Valley Railroad between Harrisburg and Carlisle. During the Civil War, the Battle of Sporting Hill became the northernmost engagement of the Gettysburg campaign, which took place at Camp Hill in late June 1863. Camp Hill was incorporated as a borough on November 10, 1885, from East Pennsboro Township. The Peace Church was added to the National Register of Historic Places in 1972.

== Healthcare ==
Penn State Holy Spirit, a 240-bed for-profit hospital is located in Camp Hill and serves as the primary facility for its related health system. The hospital was founded in 1963 and is currently owned by Penn State Health.

== Government and infrastructure ==
State Correctional Institution - Camp Hill is located in nearby Lower Allen Township, and the township formerly had the headquarters of the Pennsylvania Department of Corrections.

== Economy ==
The Warrell Corporation is a confectionery manufacturing company based in Camp Hill.

Ames True Temper is a multinational corporation headquartered in Camp Hill.

Prior to 2022, Rite Aid had its headquarters in East Pennsboro Township. This facility had a postal address stating "Camp Hill".

== Education ==
The borough of Camp Hill is served by the Camp Hill School District, which provides education beginning with half-day kindergarten through twelfth grade. Camp Hill High School serves students from the borough school district.

Three other high schools are located in the surrounding community. Cedar Cliff High School, part of the West Shore School District, is located in nearby Lower Allen Township and uses a Camp Hill postal address. Trinity High School is a parish-driven Catholic high school administered by the Roman Catholic Diocese of Harrisburg. Within the Camp Hill postal address are also students from the Cumberland Valley School District, with Cumberland Valley High School located in nearby Silver Spring Township. Part of East Pennsboro Area School District also lies within the Camp Hill postal address, including West Creek Hills Elementary School.

== Notable people ==
- Charlie Adams, former professional American football player
- Kyle Brady, former professional American football player for the New York Jets, Jacksonville Jaguars and New England Patriots
- Margaret Carlson, journalist and columnist
- Kenneth J. Dunkley (born 1939) American inventor, and President of Holospace Laboratories Inc. located in Camp Hill.
- Charles Eisenstein, writer
- Jacque Fetrow, computational biochemist, former president of Albright College
- Nicholas P. Kafkalas, US Army major general
- Bruce Larson, drag racer
- Jeffrey Lord, political commentator on CNN who was a political director in the former Reagan administration
- William Daniel Phillips, winner of the 1997 Nobel Prize in physics
- Glenn "Zeke" Ressler (b. 1943), college football All-American and former professional football player for the Baltimore Colts
- Coy Wire, former professional American football player for the Buffalo Bills and Atlanta Falcons, Fox Sports studio analyst
- Zack Kuntz, current professional American football player for the New York Jets
- Carrie Courogen, is an American writer, editor, and director
- David Freed (attorney), American lawyer who served as the United States Attorney for the Middle District of Pennsylvania from 2017 to 2021
- William Griswold (museum director), is an American museum director and curator who is director of the Cleveland Museum of Art
- James S. Forrester (cardiologist), is an American cardiologist whose research led to three major advancements in the practice of cardiology
- Edmund Storms, is a nuclear chemist known for his work in cold fusion
- Bridget M. Brennan, is a United States district judge of the United States District Court for the Northern District of Ohio.
- Alison Beam, is an American lawyer and lobbyist who served as the acting secretary of the Pennsylvania Department of Health in 2021
- Curtis Dvorak, was primarily known as Jaxson de Ville, official mascot of the Jacksonville Jaguars
- Alyssa Thomas, American professional basketball player

== In popular culture ==
In Harry Turtledove's American Civil War alternate history series of novels, unofficially titled Southern Victory, Camp Hill is the site of a decisive battle in 1862. In the novels, General Lee's victory at the battle helped to end the War of Secession, granting the Confederacy full independence from the United States.
