= Jon Vroman =

- Born: Jonathan Vroman; June 14, 1975 (age 51); Sasebo, Nagasaki, Japan
- Occupations: Motivational speaker, entrepreneur, philanthropist
- Years active: 2005–present
- Known for: founder, Front Row Foundation
- Spouse: Tatyana Vroman (m. 2008)
- Children: 2 sons
- Website: www.frontrowglobal.com, www.frontrowfoundation.org www.frontrowdads.com

Jon Vroman (born June 14, 1975) is an American motivational speaker, author, philanthropist, personal coach, and ultra-marathon runner.

== Personal life ==
On June 14, 1975, Jon Vroman was born to an American military family stationed in the city of Sasebo, Japan. Vroman's family moved frequently throughout much of his early life, residing in Camp Hill, Pennsylvania, South Carolina, Maryland, and Virginia before settling once again in Camp Hill, where Vroman graduated from high school in 1993. Vroman attended eight different schools over the course of these moves. He stated that he often had difficulty becoming involved with his peers due to the regularity of his being introduced to new communities. This experience later inspired his philosophy to "live life in the 'front row'" by actively taking charge of one's own life, after Vroman witnessed a group of ecstatic college students at the front row of a concert, and made the observation that their enjoyment of the show differed from the disinterest of attendees sitting further back. Vroman's motivational speaking continues to emphasize the importance of cultivating strong interpersonal relationships and building a sense of community with the various people in one's life.

Vroman married his wife, Russian native Tatyana, in 2008 at a ceremony in Siberia. They reside in the town of Austin Texas, with their two sons, Tiger and Ocean.

== Front Row Foundation ==
In 2005, Jon co-founded The Front Row Foundation. The initial funds for the Foundation were raised after a 53-mile, double marathon in 2005. This non-profit organization works to help people with critical health challenges take part in an experience that they have always dreamed of. The foundation helps these people live their lives to the fullest by providing front row seats to any live event of their choice so that they can “experience life in the front row.” The goal of the Foundation is to provide a Front Row experience that will allow individuals to set aside any physical or emotional challenges while they celebrate the beauty and emotional energy of life. Because great experiences in one's life are remembered forever, The Front Row Foundation focuses on providing individuals with a life-changing memory, one experience at a time.

Volunteers of the Front Row Foundation do what they do because of their deep belief in the healing powers of the mind and its immeasurable ability to nourish the human spirit. To date, the charity has raised over $1,000,000 and has been instrumental in over 60 life-changing experiences.

== Front Row Global ==
As the author of “Living College Life in the Front Row”, Jon was able to draw on his past experiences and help motivate individuals to live up to their fullest potential. In 2005, Jon started Front Row Global, where he travels across the country to speak with college students and corporate team members about how they can move from the back row of life to the front row. Vroman facilitates his hour long keynote message at numerous locations throughout America. The message Jon delivers as a speaker of Front Row Global is to capture the key ideas individuals need for their personal growth and change. This is captured through the idea of being a participant, not a spectator. This encourages individuals to step out of their comfort zone and live life to the fullest.

Vroman was voted "Campus Speaker of the Year" two years in a row by the Association for the Promotion of Campus Activities.

Vroman founded an organization, Front Row Dads, for fathers looking to be more present and engaged with their children.

In 2017, Vroman published The Front Row Factor: Everything You Can Learn About Life From Those Fighting For It. Since its release, Vroman has built on his successful career as a university keynote speaker and has become a renowned corporate speaker.
