= Peace Church =

Historic church in Pennsylvania, United States

- U.S. National Register of Historic Places
- Pennsylvania state historical marker
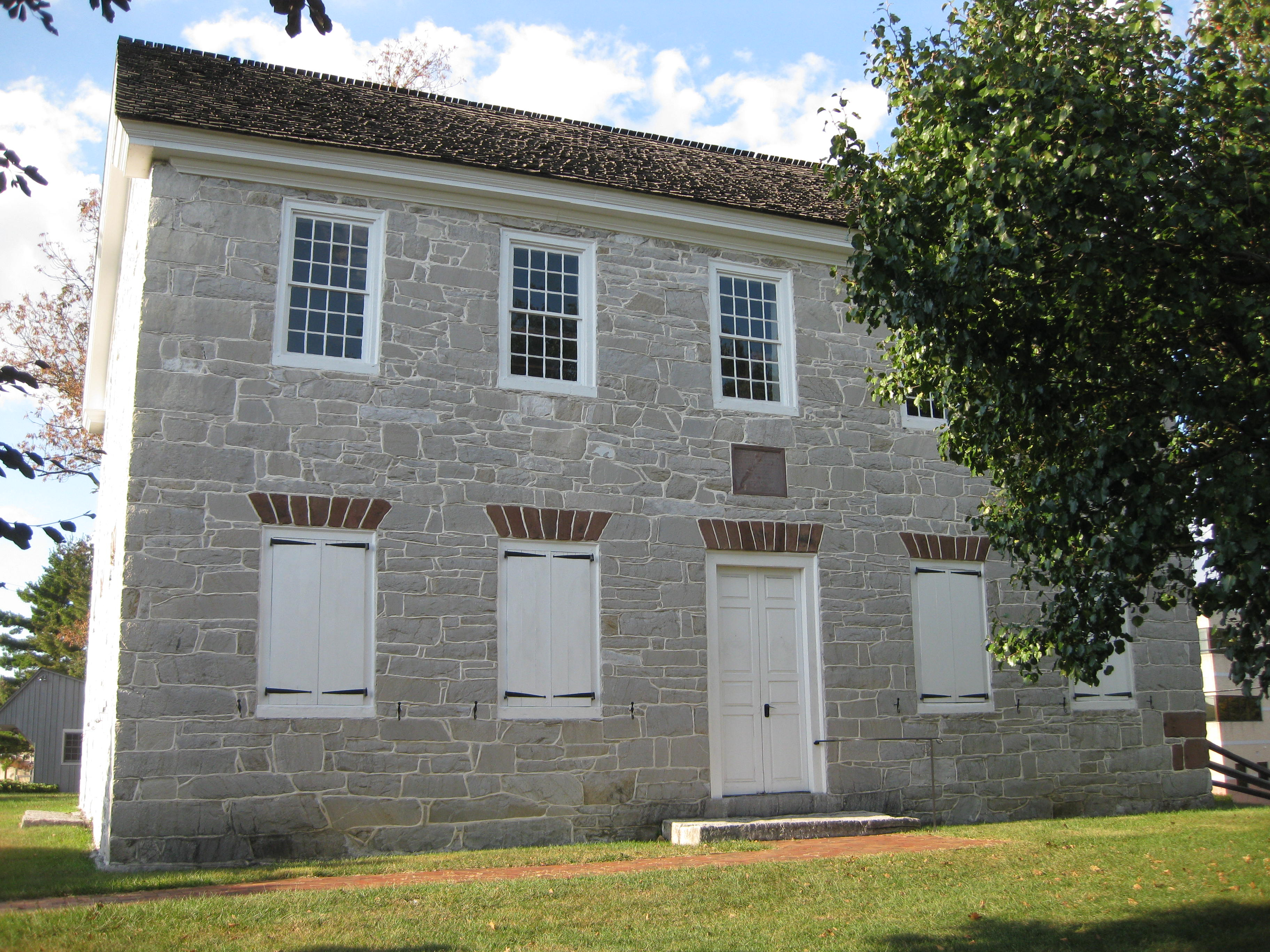
- Front of building

- Location within Pennsylvania Location within the United States
- Location: NW corner of Trindle and St. John's Rds., Camp Hill, Pennsylvania
- Coordinates: 40°13′54″N 76°57′25″W
- Area: 1 acre (0.40 ha)
- Built: 1798
- Built by: Anderson, Thomas; Rupp, Martin
- NRHP reference No.: 72001114

Significant dates
- Added to NRHP: March 24, 1972
- Designated PHMC: August 04, 1947 and May 25, 1948

The Peace Church, also known as Die Frieden Kirche, is an historic Reformed and Lutheran church in Hampden Township, Cumberland County, Pennsylvania, United States.

It was added to the National Register of Historic Places in 1972.

== History and architectural features ==
Built in 1798 by a Reformed congregation, this historic structure is a 2 1/2-story, limestone building in the Georgian style and features a five-bay front and three-bay sides. The church was the first gathering place for the community to be incorporated as Hampden Township in 1845.

In 1806, the local Lutheran congregation was invited to share the building "in peace" for their services. The church's builder, Martin Rupp, also constructed the nearby Johannes Eberly House. The interior of the church is notable for its wine-glass pulpit, a balcony that wraps around three sides, and a Conrad Doll organ installed in 1807.

One of the notable pastors of Peace Church was John Winebrenner, the founder of the “Church of God” denomination. Winebrenner was a graduate of Dickinson College in Carlisle, Pennsylvania, with the class of 1818 and was ordained in the German Reformed Church in September 1820. His enthusiastic style, which included favor of emotional revivals, soon caused dissension within his congregation. In March 1823 he was locked out of Peace Church (called “the Stone Church in Shiremanstown”) by his congregation. He left the Reformed church and founded his own conservative evangelical denomination.

Initially, Winebrenner, along with those that split off from Peace Church, met for outdoor services on a nearby hill in the area known as White Hall, leading to the area being referred to as "Camp Hill." Dr. John D. Bowman, the first postmaster of that village, officially gave it the name Camp Hill in 1869 and it was incorporated as a borough in 1885.

Peace Church also played a part in the American Civil War. A brigade under the command of Brig. Gen. Albert G. Jenkins raided nearby Mechanicsburg and set up four artillery pieces on the site of Peace Church, it being situated on a rise with a view of the surrounding area. They used this position to bombard Union forces during the Battle of Sporting Hill in June 1863. This was the northernmost engagement of the Civil War and a part of the Gettysburg Campaign.
