= James Bell Tavern =

- Location: Formerly at 086 Carlisle Pike in Silver Spring Township, Pennsylvania
- Coordinates: 40°13′58″N 77°6′18″W
- Built: 1780
- Demolished: 2017

The James Bell Tavern, also known as Stone House Auto Sales, was a historic building in Cumberland County, Pennsylvania that was the site of a significant Anti-Federalist Party meeting in 1788. Built sometime after 1744, it was located at 7086 Carlisle Pike in Silver Spring Township, Pennsylvania, prior to its demolition in 2017.

== History ==
Built sometime after 1744 as a residence for James Bell and a tavern operated by him, the house was nicknamed "The Rattlesnake" by Bell.

The James Bell Tavern was the site of the Stony Ridge Convention of the Anti-Federalist Party on July 3, 1788. Converted into different business space in later years, it ultimately became the headquarters of Stone House Auto Sales. Partially demolished in early 2016, it became the subject of a conservation attempt by historic preservationists, resulting in the temporary cessation of demolition work. When those efforts subsequently failed, demolition resumed, and was completed in March 2017.

In April 2017, the Pennsylvania Historical and Museum Commission approved a historical marker for the site.
