= Cumberland Valley High School =

Coordinates: 40.240°N 77.062°W

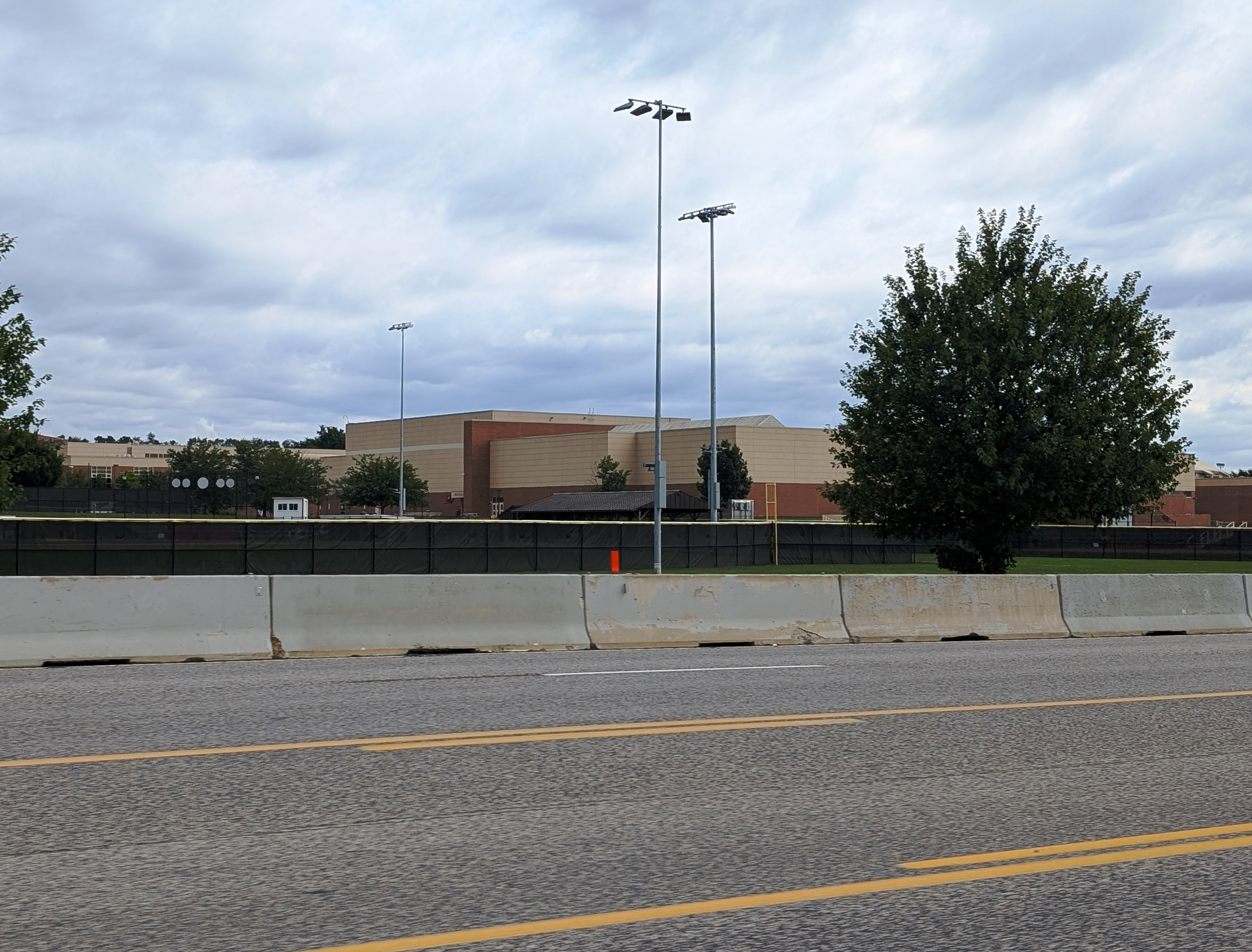
- 6746 Carlisle Pike; Mechanicsburg, Cumberland County, Pennsylvania; United States

Information
- Type: Public
- Established: 1954
- School district: Cumberland Valley School District
- Principal: Adam J. Andrechik
- Staff: 169.99 (FTE)
- Enrollment: 3,114 (2023-2024)
- Student to teacher ratio: 18.32
- Colors: Red, black, and white
- Team name: Eagles
- Website: http://www.cvschools.org/

Cumberland Valley High School (CV) is a public high school located in Silver Spring Township, Pennsylvania, Cumberland County, Pennsylvania, with a Mechanicsburg postal address. Founded in 1954, it is located in the Cumberland Valley School District. In the 2019–2020 school year, according to the National Center for Education Statistics, the school had 2,809 pupils enrolled in the ninth to twelfth grades. The school employed 150.75 full-time equivalent teachers yielding a student:teacher ratio of 18.66:1. The mascot is an Eagle.

The Cumberland Valley High School serves the four townships of Hampden, Middlesex, Monroe and Silver Spring in Cumberland County. It also includes the New Kingstown census-designated place and a portion of the Schlusser census-designated place. The area included in the school system extends from a place just outside of Carlisle Borough to Camp Hill. This area is suburban and is located fifteen miles west of Harrisburg.

The combined junior-senior high school opened in September 1954 to 800 students. The school has steadily grown since that time. This is evident by the size of only the class of 2027, which amounts to about 827 students. All schools in the district, except for Monroe Elementary, have been re-built or remodeled due to significant student population growth.

Seven elementary schools and two middle schools funnel into the high school. The middle schools are: Mountain View Middle School and Eagle View Middle School.

The library (known as IMC, stands for "Instructional Materials Center" ) is a learning center providing books, magazines, daily newspapers, audiovisuals, and CD-ROMs. Students use computers to access library resources, the Internet and to do word processing and graphical analysis. They also have interlibrary loan privileges with other libraries in the state. The school has offered the International Baccalaureate Diploma Programme since 2011.

The Performing Arts Center, known as the PAC, is much more than a traditional auditorium. It rivals many professional theaters, with its large 1,500 seat audience capacity, including an orchestra level, mezzanine, and balcony, a large stage with a sunken orchestra pit that elevates to increase the stage area, and professional light and sound capabilities. Students have opportunities to participate in and provide crew and tech support for many vocal and instrumental concerts, plays, and an annual musical that is always a sell-out.

== Extracurriculars ==
A wide variety of activities, clubs, and sports are offered to the students and community. In particular, the Cumberland Valley Science Olympiad team has seen great success in recent years, earning their first-ever state championship in April 2022 and advancing to the national tournament in 2022, 2024, and 2025. Their highest rank at the national tournament was 19th. Varsity, junior varsity, and freshman athletic activities are under the Pennsylvania Interscholastic Athletics Association. Cumberland Valley High School hosts PIAA State Championships for several sports including football, field hockey, among many others. They also host multiple all-star games. Due to this, they renovated their stadium to add artificial turf, new LED lighting, a new track, and a jumbotron.

=== Sports ===
The District funds:

Boys

- Baseball - AAAAAA
- Boys Basketball - AAAAAA
- Boys Cross Country - AAA
- Football - AAAAAA
- Boys Golf - AAA
- Boys Indoor Track and Field - AAAA
- Lacrosse - AAA
- Boys Soccer - AAAA
- Boys Swimming and Diving - AAA
- Boys Tennis - AAA
- Boys Track and Field - AAA
- Boys Volleyball - AAA
- Boys Water Polo - AAAA
- Boys Wrestling - AAA

Girls

- Girls Basketball - AAAAAA
- Girls Competitive Spirit - AAA
- Girls Cross Country - AAA
- Field Hockey - AAA
- Girls Golf - AAA
- Girls Indoor Track and Field - AAAA
- Girls Lacrosse - AAA
- Girls Soccer - AAAA
- Softball - AAAAAA
- Girls Swimming and Diving - AAA
- Girls' Tennis - AAA
- Girls Track and Field - AAA
- Girls Volleyball - AAAA
- Girls Water Polo - AAAA
- Girls Wrestling - AAAA

== Notable alumni ==
- Charlie Adams, former professional football player, Denver Broncos and Houston Texans (Class of 1998)
- Stan Gelbaugh, former professional football player, Phoenix Cardinals and Seattle Seahawks (Class of 1981)
- Joshua Gros, professional soccer player, D.C. United (Class of 2000)
- Katie Koestner, activist against sexual assault (Class of 1990)
- Chella Man, transgender artist and LGBTQ activist (Class of 2016)
- Randall R. Marchi, US Army major general (Class of 1972)
- Alpesh Patel, filmmaker (Class of 1991)
- Jon Ritchie, former professional football player (Class of 1993), Oakland Raiders and Philadelphia Eagles
- Greg Rothman, politician (Class of 1985)
- Carla Sands, former U.S. ambassador to Denmark
- Scump, professional Call of Duty player (Class of 2013)
- Carla Thomas, former professional basketball player, Chicago Sky player (Class of 2003)
- Stacey Williams, actress and model (Class of 1986)
- Lucas Wolfe, professional racecar driver in the World of Outlaws Series (Class of 2005)
