= M. Harvey Taylor Memorial Bridge =

Bridge in Harrisburg, Pennsylvania

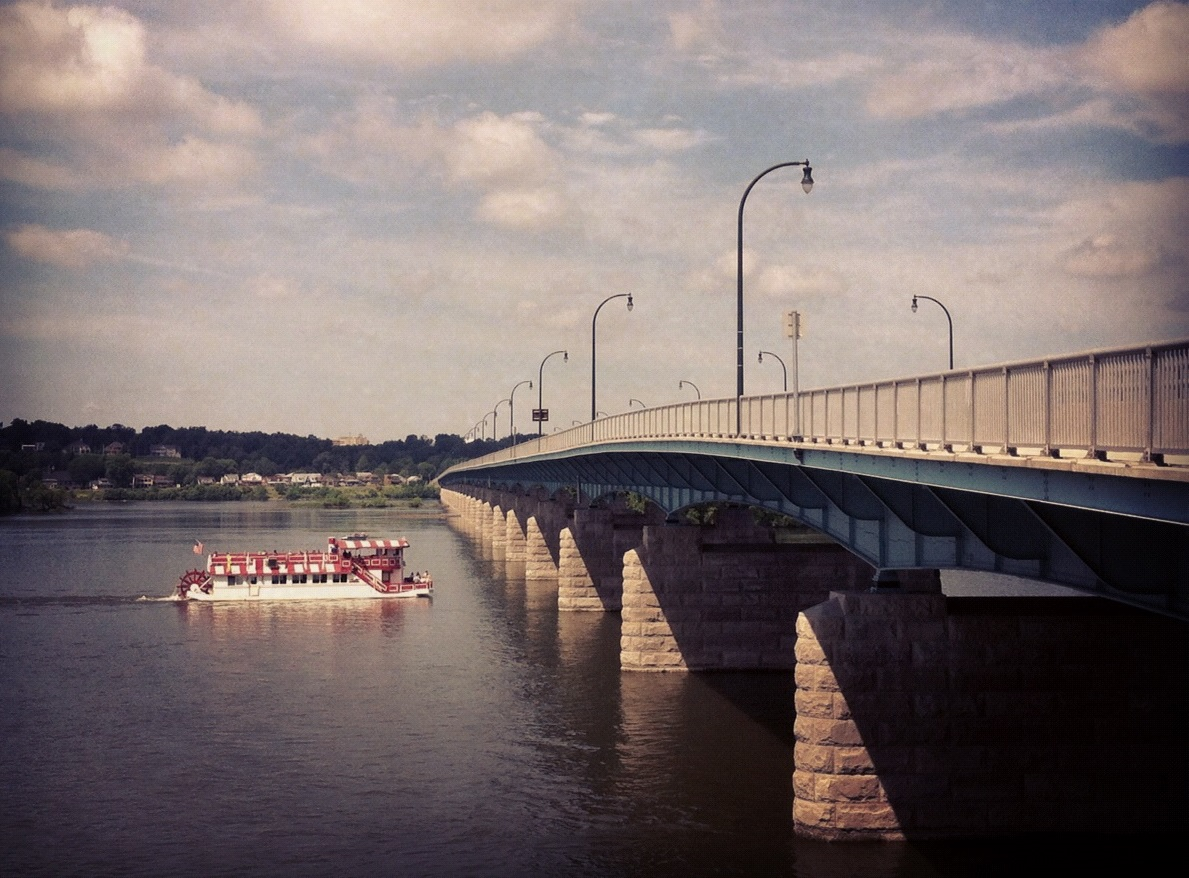
- Pride of the Susquehanna passing under the Bridge
- Coordinates: 40.2626°N 76.8974°W
- Carries: Motor vehicles and pedestrians
- Crosses: Susquehanna River
- Locale: Harrisburg, Pennsylvania and Wormleysburg, PA, U.S.
- Maintained by: PennDOT

History
- Opened: 1952

The M. Harvey Taylor Bridge is a steel girder multilane highway bridge that spans the Susquehanna River, connecting Pennsylvania state capital Harrisburg to Wormleysburg in Cumberland County. Built in the early 1950s, it was reconstructed and widened in 2001-04 to accommodate additional pedestrian walkways. The speed limit is 50 miles per hour (80 km/h). The Average Daily Traffic in 2016 was 28,139, only 2% of which was trucks. The bridge has never had a route designation.

== History ==
Built to accommodate the rising volume of cross-river commuter traffic from the growing West Shore suburbs after World War II, the bridge opened on January 24, 1952 as Harrisburg’s first toll-free span across the Susquehanna. The bridge was named prior to its opening in honor of State Senator M. (Maris) Harvey Taylor (1876-1982), a prominent state legislator from Harrisburg who held public office almost continuously from 1907 to 1964, and who was instrumental in getting it built. Originally envisaged on a site further north, Taylor wanted the bridge closer to downtown in order to relieve the traffic-congested bridges that fed into the central business district and service the expanding Capitol Complex of state government buildings.

The approaches to the bridge illustrate the changing character and implications of new American urban roads in the 1950s. On the Harrisburg side the bridge fed directly and at grade into Forster Street, whose trees, homes, and shops on one side were leveled to create a spartan boulevard eight lanes wide, intended to connect with the State Street Bridge via a similarly widened 7th Street. The surviving buildings fell into neglect or were bought up by the state, and much of its one-mile length was soon flanked by eroding housing or stark new government office buildings. The new Forster Street soon was traffic congested during the day, desolate at night, and split downtown from midtown Harrisburg, helping both districts into decline. On the West Shore side, the bridge approach was a new mile-long freeway, the Camp Hill Express (today’s Harvey Taylor Bridge Bypass), routed through then-open land to connect with the Camp Hill Bypass at 21st Street. To accommodate the additional bridge traffic, within a few years the Cumberland Blvd and 32nd Street segments of the Bypass were widened from their original 1940s configuration to create a divided four-lane highway reaching to the southern end of Camp Hill.

During its planning stages, the Harvey Taylor was called the “North Bridge,” in reference to the older Walnut Street and Market Street automobile bridges at the heart of the downtown, 1.5 miles downriver. Less than a decade after it opened, the continued rise in commuter traffic fueled by suburban growth prompted construction of the Harrisburg Expressway with another multilane span, the John Harris Bridge. Locally, the John Harris is still often called the “South Bridge,” but the Harvey Taylor’s official name has endured.

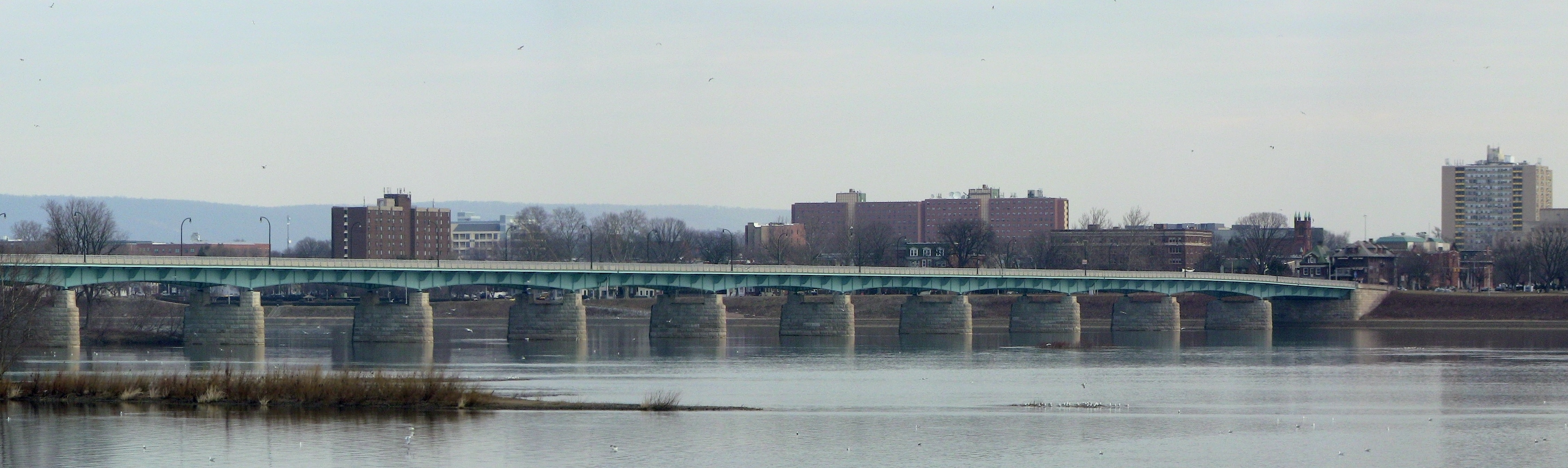
M. Harvey Taylor Memorial Bridge 2013

== See also ==
- List of crossings of the Susquehanna River
