= George N. Wade Memorial Bridge =

- Coordinates: 40°18′50″N 76°54′29″W
- Carries: 6 lanes of I-81
- Crosses: Susquehanna River
- Locale: East Pennsboro Township and Harrisburg
- Other name: North Bridge
- Maintained by: Pennsylvania Department of Transportation

Characteristics
- Total length: 5,188 feet (1,581 m)
- Width: 109 feet (33 m) to 230 feet (70 m)

History
- Opened: August 16, 1973 (westbound); August 31, 1973 (eastbound)

Statistics
- Daily traffic: 64,000 daily

Location
- Interactive map of George N. Wade Memorial Bridge

The George N. Wade Memorial Bridge, also known as the North Bridge, carries Interstate 81 (I-81) and the Capital Beltway across the Susquehanna River in Harrisburg, Pennsylvania.

== History and architectural features ==
Bridge construction began during the late 1960s. On August 16, 1973, the bridge was dedicated and the three westbound lanes were opened to traffic in a ceremony officiated by Governor Milton Shapp. The eastbound lanes opened on August 31, 1973.

This bridge is 5,188 feet (1,581 m) long and varies in width from 109 feet (33 m) to 230 feet (70 m). It carries six lanes of traffic and has two collector road and five ramp connections. Average daily traffic counts for this section of I-81 are nearly 32,000 vehicles in each direction. While I-81 is officially a north–south Interstate, the bridge runs in a roughly east–west alignment.

A $36.5 million rehabilitation of the bridge began in 2009 and was scheduled to be completed in early 2012; however, additional repairs were undertaken in subsequent years.

== See also ==
- List of crossings of the Susquehanna River
