= Kenneth J. Dunkley =

American inventor of 3D glasses

- Born: December 29, 1939 (age 86); New York, US
- Other names: Ken Dunkley
- Known for: Inventing and patenting 3-D viewing glasses

Kenneth J. Dunkley (born 1939) is an American physicist, inventor and business man. He is best known in the field of holography for inventing and patenting Three Dimensional Viewing Glasses (3-DVG). He serves as the president of Holospace Laboratories Inc. of Camp Hill, Pennsylvania.

== About ==
Dunkley was born on December 29, 1939, in New York. Dunkley, who has a master's degree in physics, conducted research in human vision that led to his discovery that a 2-dimensional picture would appear as 3-dimensional if two points in a person's peripheral vision were blocked. This discovery led to future improvements of 3D viewing glasses and the technology we use to view films today.

Known as both a visual pioneer and a leader in the field of holography, Dunkley is the president of Holospace Laboratories Inc. and conducts visual effects workshops at the Museum of Scientific Discovery in Harrisburg, Pennsylvania. Dunkley also has experience as a Microsoft and robotics application trainer.
