= Johannes Eberly House =

Historic house in Pennsylvania, United States

- U.S. National Register of Historic Places
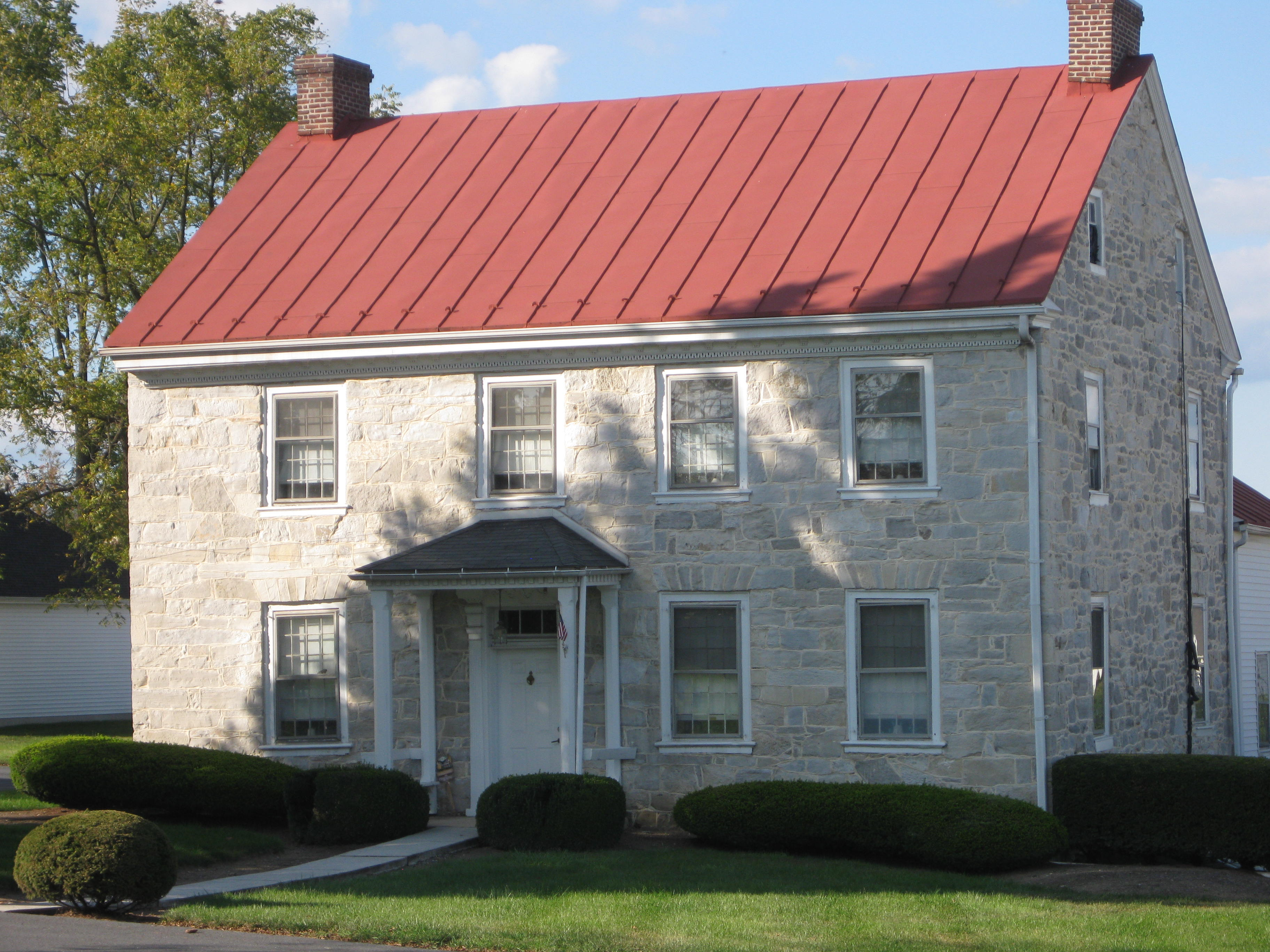

- Location within Pennsylvania Location within the United States
- Location: Northeast of Mechanicsburg on U.S. Route 11, Hampden Township, Pennsylvania
- Coordinates: 40°14′25″N 76°58′41″W
- Area: 0.5 acres (0.20 ha)
- Built: 1794-1798
- Built by: Rupp, Martin
- Architectural style: Georgian, Federal
- NRHP reference No.: 73001619
- Added to NRHP: April 2, 1973

The Johannes Eberly House, also known as the Old Bricker House or the McCormick House, is a historic American home that is located in Hampden Township in Cumberland County, Pennsylvania.

Listed on the National Register of Historic Places in 1973, the Johannes Eberly House is also notable for being the site of the Skirmish of Sporting Hill, the northernmost engagement of Robert E. Lee's Army of Northern Virginia during the American Civil War.

== History and architectural features ==
Built between 1794 and 1798, this structure is a 2 1/2-story, fieldstone building with a gable roof, and is four bays wide. Its architecture suggests a transition from Georgian to Federal style, with a combination of Dutch-German and English building styles. Its builder, Martin Rupp, also built the Peace Church.
