= John Harris Bridge =

Bridge in United States of America

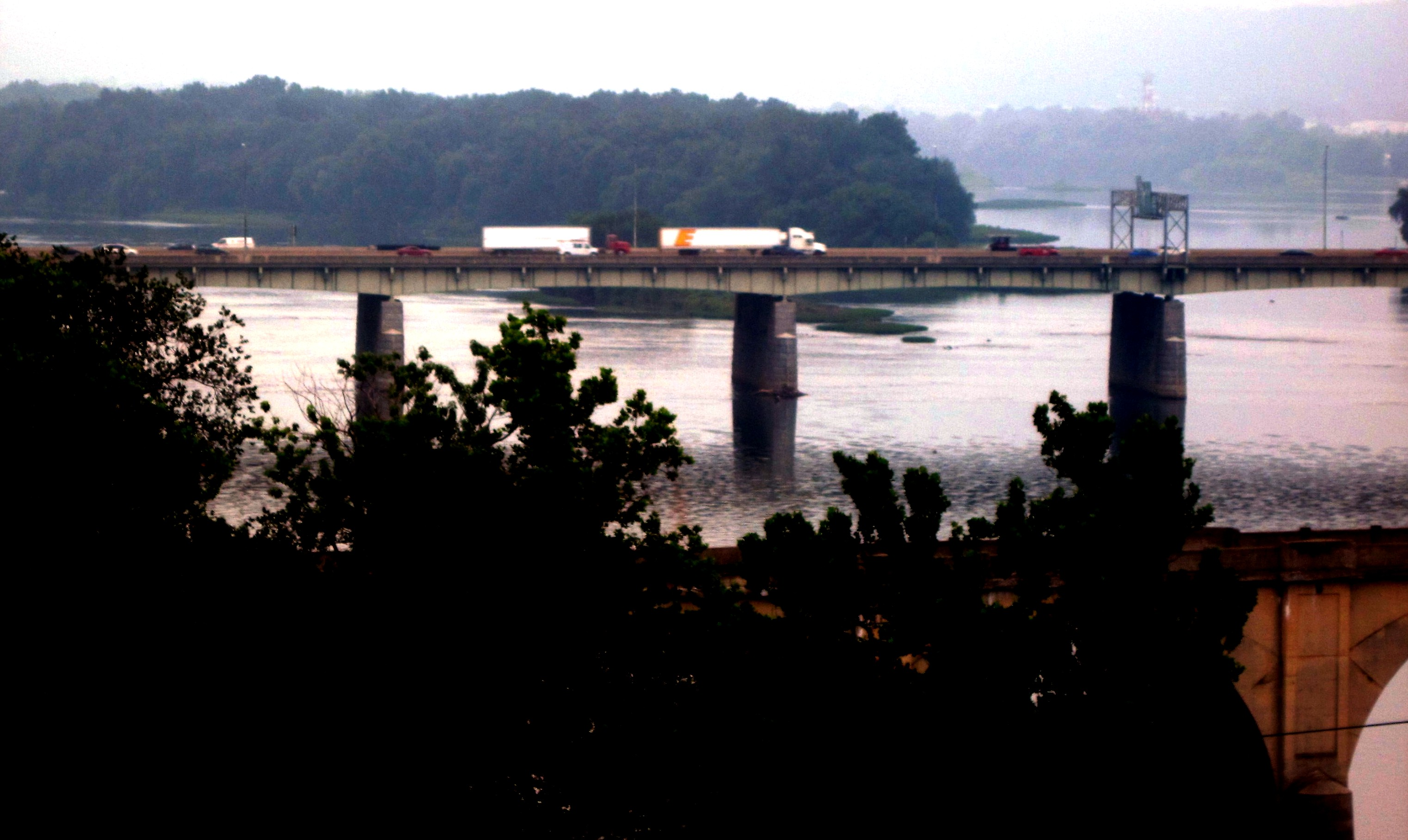
- John Harris Bridge in Harrisburg behind the Philadelphia and Reading Railroad Bridge
- Coordinates: 40.2481°N 76.8778°W
- Carries: 7 lanes of I-83
- Crosses: Susquehanna River
- Locale: Cumberland County, Pennsylvania and Harrisburg, Pennsylvania
- Other name: South Bridge
- Maintained by: Pennsylvania Department of Transportation

Characteristics
- Width: 7 traffic lanes

History
- Opened: January 22, 1960

Statistics
- Daily traffic: 125,000 daily (2003)

Location
- Interactive map of John Harris Bridge

The John Harris Bridge is a steel girder multilane highway bridge that carries Interstate 83 and the Capital Beltway across the Susquehanna River, connecting Harrisburg, Pennsylvania to Cumberland County (the East and West Shores of metropolitan Harrisburg). It is primarily used by commuters and local services, including the extensive local trucking industry, and also carries cross-river traffic to or from the counties of the lower Susquehanna Valley.

== History and architectural features ==
The bridge was named in honor of John Harris, Sr, an early eighteenth-century trader and ferry operator who was among the earliest Europeans to settle in the area, and whose son laid out the city he named after his father. It is also known locally as the South Bridge, in reference to the older Walnut Street, Market Street, and Harvey Taylor bridges upstream, which were the primary local automobile crossings at the time of its construction.

A product of the post-World War II growth of the Harrisburg suburbs, the bridge officially opened on January 22, 1960, as part of the Harrisburg Expressway. On the east shore, Central Iron and Steel and parts of the Shipoke neighborhood, both dating from the 19th century, were demolished to accommodate the bridge and its exit ramps into the downtown.

The bridge was widened to six lanes in 1982. In 1997, the Expressway and bridge were designated as part of the Capital Beltway which loops the metropolitan area. In 2015, as part of a nearby reconstruction project, a fourth northbound lane was opened on the outside shoulder, for a total of seven traffic lanes.

== Replacement ==
In 2020, the John Harris Bridge was one of nine bridges selected by the Pennsylvania Department of Transportation (PennDOT) for end-of-life replacement under its Pathways Major Bridge Public-Private Partnership (P3) Initiative. Because P3 costs were to be paid in part by tolling, the Dauphin and Cumberland County governments, state legislators, and business groups came out against the P3 Initiative or making the John Harris a toll bridge. Lawsuits were filed against PennDOT, and in June 2022, Pennsylvania’s Commonwealth Court permanently blocked the P3 Initiative. In July 2022, the state enacted Act 84, rescinding the bridge-tolling plan.

In November 2026, a bid for approximately $1.3 billion was submitted and according to PennDot, it is the largest construction contract in the agency's history. The project replaces the bridge, as well as adjacent segments of the highway and interchanges, spanning from just north of the PA 581 interchange at the south end, across the river to the ongoing (as of 2026) East Shore section 3 project at the north end. Construction is expected to start in January 2027, with completion expected in 2039.

== See also ==
- List of crossings of the Susquehanna River
