= Hampden Township, Pennsylvania =

Township in Pennsylvania, US

Hampden Township
- Township
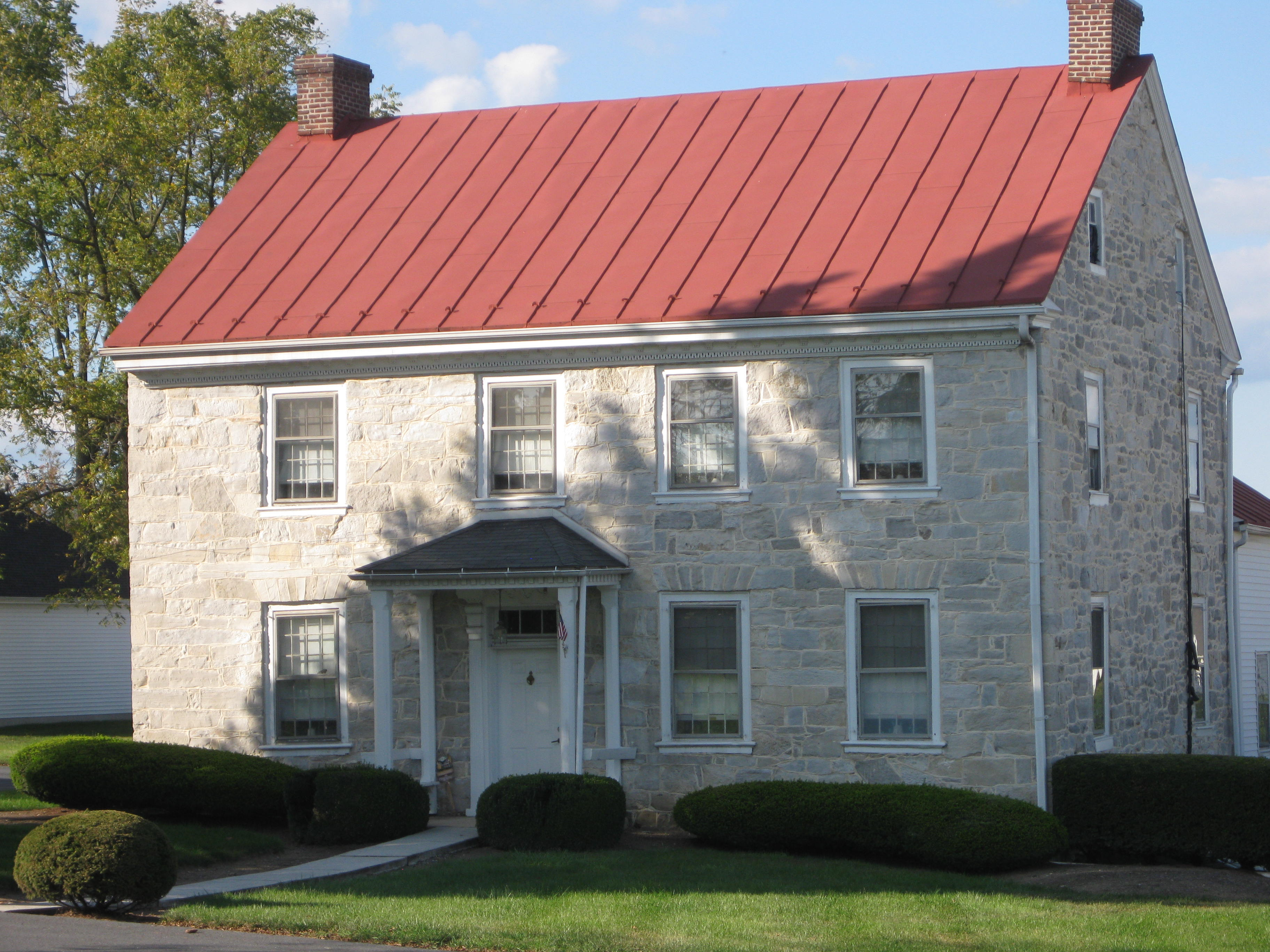
- Johannes Eberly House
- Motto: Where People Come First
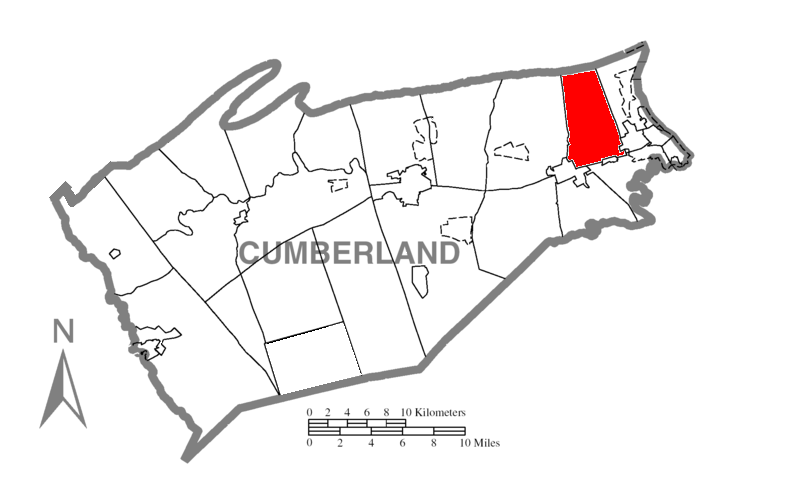
- Map of Cumberland County, Pennsylvania highlighting Hampden Township

- Location in Pennsylvania and the United States Hampden Township (the United States)
- Coordinates: 40°14′00″N 76°57′59″W
- Country: United States
- State: Pennsylvania
- County: Cumberland
- Settled: 1731
- Incorporated: January 23, 1845

Government
  - Type: Board of Commissioners
  - President: Nathan Silcox
  - Vice President: Sherry Chippo
  - Secretary: John Gaspich
  - Supervisor: Al Bienstock
  - Supervisor: John V. Thomas

Area
  - Total: 17.76 sq mi (46.01 km^{2})
  - Land: 17.24 sq mi (44.66 km^{2})
  - Water: 0.52 sq mi (1.35 km^{2})

Population (2020)
  - Total: 32,762
  - Density: 1,779.9/sq mi (687.24/km^{2})
- Time zone: UTC-5 (Eastern (EST))
  - Summer (DST): UTC-4 (EDT)
- Area codes: 717, 223
- FIPS code: 42-041-32296
- Website: www.hampdentownship.us

Historical population
Census	Pop.	Note	%±
1970	11,847		—
1980	17,732		49.7%
1990	20,384		15.0%
2000	24,135		18.4%
2010	28,044		16.2%
2020	32,762		16.8%
2023 (est.)	34,921		6.6%
U.S. Decennial Census

Hampden Township is the largest municipality by population in Cumberland County, Pennsylvania, United States. The population was 32,762 at the 2020 census, up from 28,004 at the 2010 census.

== History ==
Prior to Hampden Township's incorporation in 1845, the area served as a community center in the form of the Historic Peace Church whose cornerstone was laid in 1798. During the Civil War, the township was the site of the Battle of Sporting Hill in 1863, the northernmost engagement of the Army of Northern Virginia and a part of the Gettysburg Campaign.

By 1960, Hampden Township was designated a Township of the First Class, reflecting its growing population of approximately 6,600. While much of the area remained farmland at the time, it was beginning to transition into a suburban community.

Some of the historical structures in the Township are the Peace Church added to the National Register of Historic Places in 1972 and the Johannes Eberly House, added to the National Register of Historic Places in 1973.

== Geography ==
Hampden Township is located in northeastern Cumberland County, drained by Conodoguinet Creek, which makes several large bends across the middle of the township on its way east towards the Susquehanna River. Blue Mountain separates the township in the north from Perry County. Its villages include Brennemans Mill, Good Hope, Mount Zion, and Sporting Hill.

Interstate 81 crosses the northern part of the township, with access from Exit 61 (Pennsylvania Route 944) at Mount Zion. Pennsylvania Route 581, the southwestern segment of Harrisburg's Capital Beltway, interchanges with I-81 in the west and runs south then east across the township, with access from Exit 2 (Creekview Road), Exit 3 (Carlisle Pike/U.S. Route 11), and Exit 4 (Pennsylvania Route 641).

According to the U.S. Census Bureau, the township has a total area of 17.9 square miles (46.3 km^{2}), of which 17.3 square miles (44.9 km^{2}) is land and 0.54 square miles (1.4 km^{2}), or 2.93%, is water.

=== Adjacent municipalities ===
- East Pennsboro Township (east)
- Camp Hill (southeast)
- Lower Allen Township (south)
- Shiremanstown (south)
- Mechanicsburg (southwest)
- Silver Spring Township (west)
- Rye Township, Perry County (north)

=== Climate ===
The township has a hot-summer humid continental climate (Dfa) and the hardiness zones are 7a and 6b. Annual monthly average temperatures in Sporting Hill range from 29.9 °F in January to 74.8 °F in July. The annual absolute minimum temperature in Sporting Hill is 0.3 °F.

== Demographics ==
At the 2020 census there were 32,761 people, 11,779 households living in the township. The population density was 1,558 inhabitants per square mile (602/km^{2}). There were 12,261 housing units at an average density of 681.1 per square mile (263.0/km^{2}). The racial makeup of the township was 88.9% White, 1.7% African American, 0.1% Native American, 7.1% Asian, 0.0% Pacific Islander, 0.6% from other races, and 0.2% from two or more races. Hispanic or Latino of any race were 2.0%.

There were 11,470 households, 29.9% had children under the age of 18 living with them, 59.7% were married couples living together, 7.1% had a female householder with no husband present, and 30.3% were non-families. 25.4% of households were made up of individuals, and 9.5% were one person aged 65 or older. The average household size was 2.44 and the average family size was 2.94.

The age distribution was 23.2% under the age of 18, 9.6% from 18 to 24, 25.2% from 25 to 44, 31.2% from 45 to 64, and 15.1% 65 or older. The median age was 42.6 years. For every 100 females, there were 93.4 males. For every 100 females age 18 and over, there were 92.4 males.

The median household income was $85,284 and the median family income was $105,121. Males had a median income of $62,566 versus $51,473 for females. The per capita income for the township was $42,955. About 1.2% of families and 3.6% of the population were below the poverty line, including 2.6% of those under age 18 and 3.1% of those age 65 or over.

== Government and infrastructure ==
Hampden Township became a first class township on January 1, 1960.

The Pennsylvania Department of Corrections has its headquarters in the township.

Naval Ship Parts Control Center Mechanicsburg (of Naval Support Activity Mechanicsburg) is in Hampden Township.

== Education ==
Hampden Township is served by the Cumberland Valley School District.

- Silver Spring Elementary
- Middlesex Elementary
- Hampden Elementary
- Monroe Elementary
- Green Ridge Elementary
- Shaull Elementary
- Sporting Hill Elementary
- Winding Creek Elementary
- Eagle View Middle School
- Mountain View Middle School
- Cumberland Valley High School

== Parks and recreation ==
Hampden township maintains over 100 acres (0.40 km^{2}) of parkland and recreation facilities.

- Hampden Pool and Park
- Creekview Recreation Area
- Salem Community Park
- Conodoguinet Youth Park

The township also manages Armitage Golf Club, a 70-par course located along Orrs Bridge Road.

=== Other parks ===
- Indian Creek Park
- Pinebrook Neighborhood Park
