= Edmund Storms =

American nuclear chemist

- Born: 22 April 1931 (age 94); Camp Hill, Pennsylvania, US
- Known for: Cold fusion
- Scientific career
- Fields: Chemistry; Radiochemistry
- Institutions: Los Alamos National Lab

Edmund Storms (born 22 April 1931) is a nuclear chemist known for his work in cold fusion.

== Career ==
He is a nuclear chemist who worked at Los Alamos National Lab for more than 30 years. He established Kiva Labs in Santa Fe where he continues exploration of evidence of his model of cold fusion. Storms is also a Science Advisor to Cold Fusion Now.

Storm's work is listed in the Atomic Energy of Canada Ltd. 2013 Report on cold fusion, which identifies 25 theories on the mechanisms behind cold fusion, but notes that "What was apparent from this review is that there has been a plethora of investigations and theories for CF/LENR/CMNS over the last 20 years, but a relative shortage of credible, peer-reviewed information sources."

== Publications ==
Storms has published more than a hundred journal articles and several books. He has spoken on his work at conferences of the ACS, APS, and ICCF

=== Selected publications ===
- Storms, E. (2007). Science Of Low Energy Nuclear Reaction, The: A Comprehensive Compilation Of Evidence And Explanations About Cold Fusion. Singapore: World Scientific Publishing Company.
- Krivit, SB (2013). "Nuclear phenomena in Low-energy Nuclear Reaction (LENR) research". Naturwissenschaften. 100 (9): 899–900. doi:10.1007/s00114-013-1080-z. PMID 23949247. S2CID 253637090.
