= Rutherford, Pennsylvania =

Unincorporated community in Pennsylvania, US

- Census-designated place
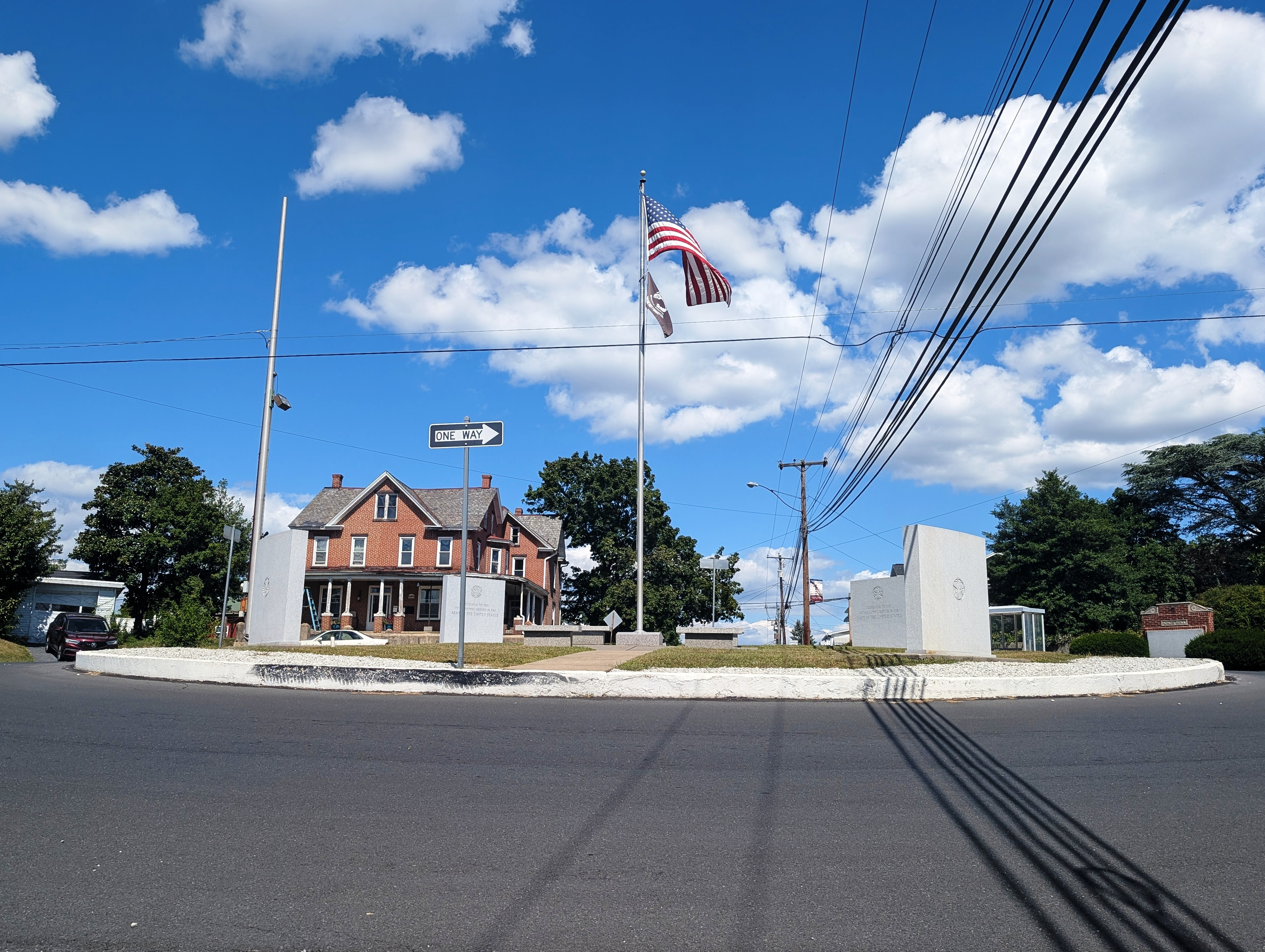
- Veterans memorial in the center of the village

- Location in Dauphin County and state of Pennsylvania
- Coordinates: 40°16′5″N 76°46′20″W
- Country: United States
- State: Pennsylvania
- County: Dauphin
- Township: Swatara

Area
  - Total: 1.3 sq mi (3.3 km^{2})
  - Land: 1.3 sq mi (3.3 km^{2})
  - Water: 0 sq mi (0.0 km^{2})
- Elevation: 510 ft (160 m)

Population (2010)
  - Total: 4,303
  - Density: 3,374/sq mi (1,302.9/km^{2})
- Time zone: UTC-5 (Eastern (EST))
  - Summer (DST): UTC-4 (EDT)
- FIPS code: 42-66864
- GNIS feature ID: 1867507

Rutherford is a census-designated place (CDP) in Swatara Township, Dauphin County, Pennsylvania, United States. The area is also known as Rutherford Heights. The population was 4,303 at the 2010 census, an increase over the figure of 3,859 tabulated in 2000. It is part of the Harrisburg–Carlisle Metropolitan Statistical Area.

== Geography ==
Rutherford is located in northeastern Swatara Township at 40°16′5″N 76°46′20″W (40.268039, -76.772220). It is bordered to the north by Lower Paxton Township and to the west by Lawnton. Downtown Harrisburg is 8 miles (13 km) to the west.

According to the United States Census Bureau, the CDP has a total area of 1.3 square miles (3.3 km^{2}), all land.

Rutherford holds its own school, which is part of the Central Dauphin School District.

== Demographics ==
As of the census of 2000, there were 3,859 people, 1,625 households, and 1,116 families residing in the CDP. The population density was 3,143.7 inhabitants per square mile (1,213.8/km^{2}). There were 1,675 housing units at an average density of 1,364.5 per square mile (526.8/km^{2}). The racial makeup of the CDP was 87.64% White, 7.80% African American, 0.10% Native American, 1.74% Asian, 0.05% Pacific Islander, 0.96% from other races, and 1.71% from two or more races. Hispanic or Latino of any race were 2.59% of the population.

There were 1,625 households, out of which 29.9% had children under the age of 18 living with them, 53.3% were married couples living together, 12.5% had a female householder with no husband present, and 31.3% were non-families. 27.2% of all households were made up of individuals, and 9.4% had someone living alone who was 65 years of age or older. The average household size was 2.36 and the average family size was 2.87.

In the CDP, the population was spread out, with 23.0% under the age of 18, 5.9% from 18 to 24, 31.7% from 25 to 44, 23.8% from 45 to 64, and 15.6% who were 65 years of age or older. The median age was 39 years. For every 100 females, there were 87.5 males. For every 100 females age 18 and over, there were 81.9 males.

The median income for a household in the CDP was $43,340, and the median income for a family was $51,494. Males had a median income of $36,035 versus $28,575 for females. The per capita income for the CDP was $22,706. About 6.2% of families and 5.5% of the population were below the poverty line, including 6.8% of those under age 18 and 5.1% of those age 65 or over.
