= Katie Koestner =

American activist against sexual assault (born 1972)

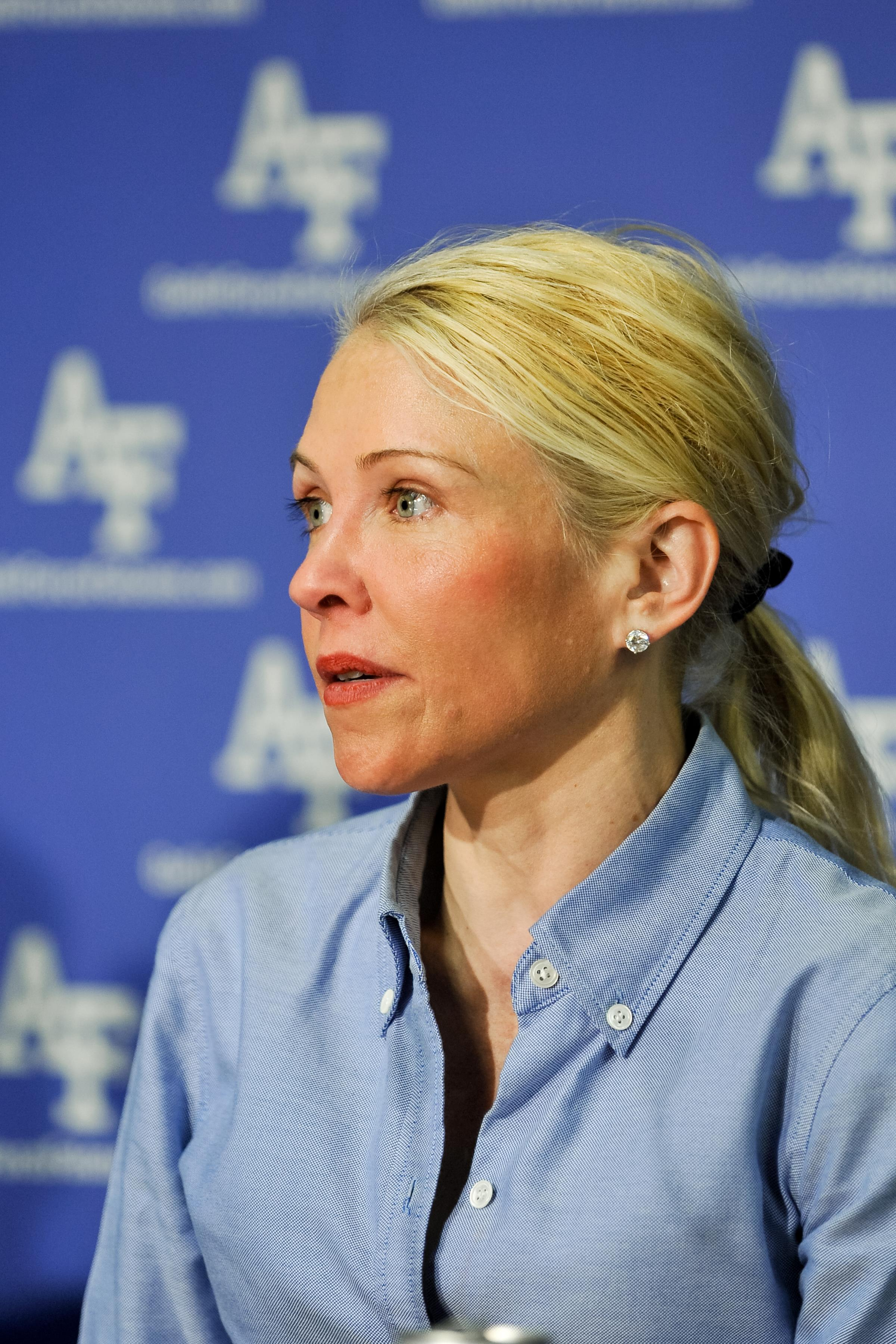
- Born: 1972 (age 53–54)
- Occupation: Activist against sexual assault

Katherine H. Koestner is an American activist against sexual assault. She came forward in 1990 at 18 years old publicly after an alleged rape that took place on William and Mary campus which involved her and her date. Koestner started speaking out about her experience in 1991 by lecturing at other college campuses to raise awareness. She also volunteered in rape crisis centers. She was featured in the media, including an HBO special, No Visible Bruises: The Katie Koestner Story (1993). Koestner's work and activism has helped the term "date rape" become part of the larger discussion around rape and sexual assault. Koestner founded several campus sexual assault prevention groups after graduating from the College of William & Mary in 1994. Koester is the executive director of the Take Back The Night Foundation, president of Campus Outreach Services and serves as an advisor for other organizations to help prevent rape and other forms of sexual violence.

== Early life and assault ==
Koestner is from Harrisburg, Pennsylvania. She graduated from Cumberland Valley High School in Mechanicsburg, Pennsylvania, in the spring of 1990. In the fall of 1990, she enrolled in William and Mary (W&M) where she planned to study chemical engineering and Japanese. Koestner was raped by a student she had been dating for just over a week. She had invited the student back to her dorm room after a date. They had gone on a date to a French restaurant and Koestner wanted to spend time alone with him afterwards. After inviting him in, she says he began to pressure her to have sex with him, continuing to pressure until nearly dawn. She ended up being pinned against her pink carpet by her date. Koestner said that she felt tired and weak after hours of arguing about sex and said, "He just wore me down all night. I couldn't do anything." She said her date "climbed on top of her and had sex despite her alleged protests." She said she felt "paralyzed" and that "he had a ginormous ego, and had always had what he wanted in life".

Koestner did not receive any kind of medical examination until 24 hours had passed. Her former date left her notes and friends tried to arrange a meeting between them, hoping things could be patched up between them. She met him in his dorm lounge where she confronted him and asked if he had heard her say "no". He countered by saying that he heard that Koestner's father was angry with her for no longer being a virgin. Koestner also felt that her alleged rape was not "taken seriously" by the school nurse who advised her to take sleeping pills and "rest the events off" instead of getting a rape kit. Instead of filing a police report, she was asked to pursue an administrative hearing at W&M. The dean of students told her it was easier to pursue her complaint through the judicial process at the college. During the hearing, the alleged rapist said he never heard Koestner say "no", as she claims, at least 12 times that night. It was decided at the hearing that there should not be a severe punishment for the rape and the perpetrator was allowed to stay "on campus on the condition that he not enter anyone's living quarters." There were "mitigating circumstances" according to administrators that allowed the alleged rapist to stay on campus.

== Publicity ==
Because she felt a lack of support from her roommate and other women in her all-female dorm, within a couple of months after she was allegedly assaulted, Koestner moved to new quarters on campus. Her parents were also unsupportive of her. Nevertheless, in 1991, Koestner came forward publicly and stated that she was the unnamed victim in the campus hearing of the rape. The letter that she sent to her local paper trended nationwide. Koestner appeared on the cover of TIME magazine. She appeared on Larry King Live, The Oprah Winfrey Show, The Jane Whitney Show, CNBC Talk Live, and was featured in the Washington Post. The publicity caused Governor Doug Wilder to ask officials involved in education in Virginia to study campus rape. A few years after Koestner came forward publicly, W&M changed their policies so that students found guilty of sexual assault are required to be suspended. Koestner faced backlash for her public story about the rape: she received prank phone calls and social stigma from other classmates.

Koestner chose to come forward to give a human face to the issue of date rape and also because she felt like the academic hearing was a "second victimization." Koestner wanted justice. A reporter, Jim Spencer, pointed out that while having a C average and being on academic probation could lead to expulsion, a decision that a rape occurred in the hearing did not lead to a similar punishment. The alleged rapist came forward anonymously in the press to state that he felt the situation was unfairly exaggerated: he had been convicted by the hearing of "emotionally pressuring, not physically forcing Koestner to have intercourse." He also said that he believed that Koestner was falsely accusing him of rape because she "began to express regrets" about having intercourse.

In 1991, Koestner transferred to Cornell University, but came back to W&M after a year after the student who allegedly raped her had been temporarily suspended. Controversy over her paid role in a planned HBO dramatization about her experience led to the creation of a petition that asked for the "man's point of view" to be considered in the story. The leader of the petition campaign was the current girlfriend of Koestner's alleged rapist. The petition signers said that the name of the alleged rapist was known on the small campus and that he would be "ruined." The school paper received letters to the editor criticizing Koestner for not reporting the rape sooner. Koestner appeared in the HBO dramatization, No Visible Bruises: The Katie Koestner Story in 1993. No Visible Bruises was a 1/2 hour special that was part of HBO's series, Life Stories: Families in Crisis. Koestner started giving workshops about preventing sexual assault and also on sexual assault policies on college campuses. Her appearances were considered "divisive" by some students at the time. Koestner graduated from W&M in 1994, majoring in public policy and women's studies.

== Groups ==
Koestner founded the educational organization, Campus Outreach Services in 1994. She also founded Students Helping Others to Understand Trauma (SHOUT) at Cornell University and at W&M started the Sexual Assault Companions Program. She also volunteered at a rape crisis center and became a certified peer-educator ad sexual assault counselor in Virginia. She became the executive director of the Take Back the Night Foundation. She has been published online and in print. It was Koestner's efforts that brought the concept and term "date rape" to public attention. Koestner was the first victim of alleged date rape to publicly come forward about her experience.
