= Lawnton, Pennsylvania =

Unincorporated community in Pennsylvania, US

- Census-designated place
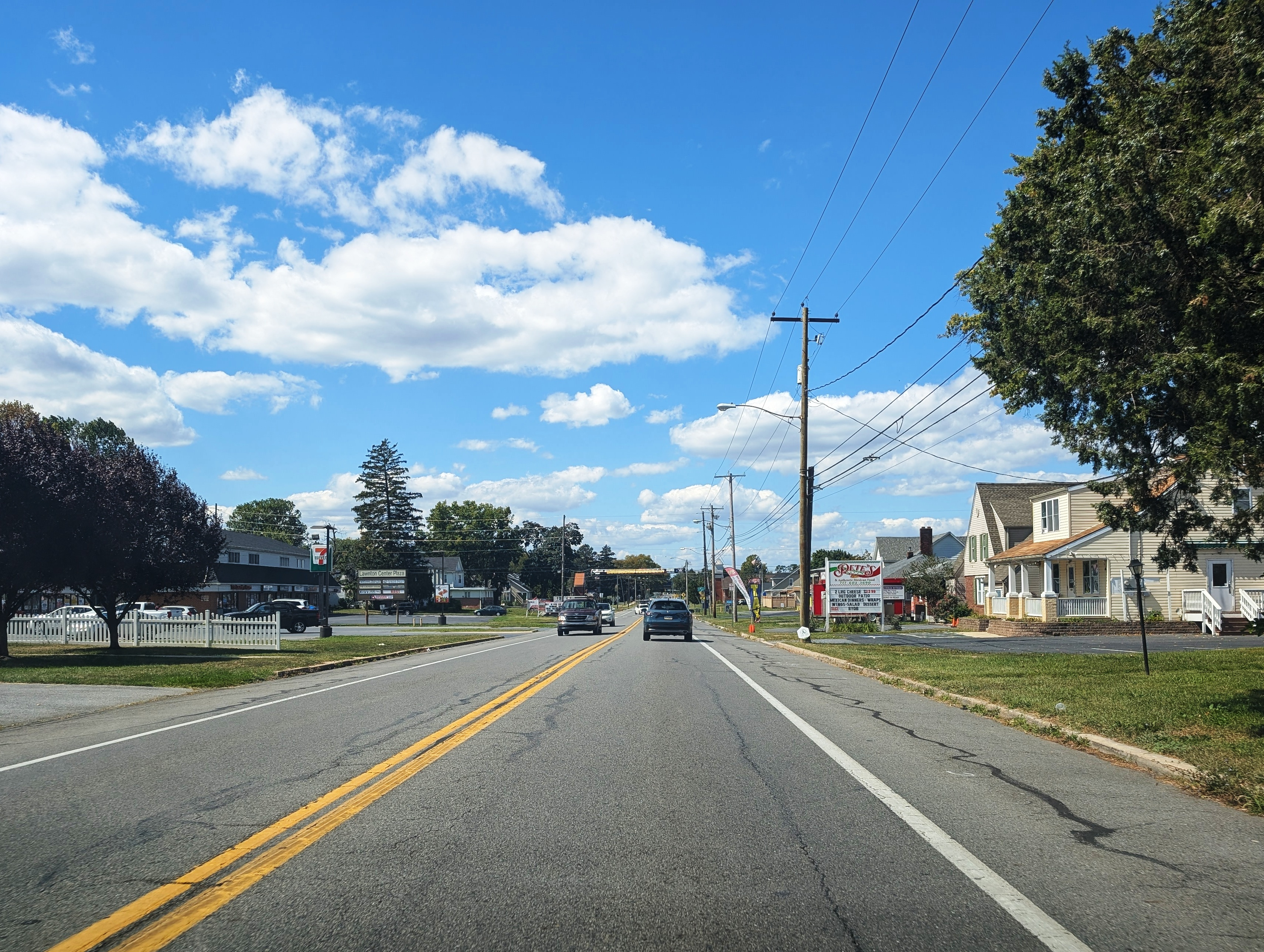
- Westbound Derry Street in Lawnton

- Location in Dauphin County and state of Pennsylvania.
- Coordinates: 40°15′41″N 76°48′11″W
- Country: United States
- State: Pennsylvania
- County: Dauphin
- Township: Swatara

Area
  - Total: 1.46 sq mi (3.78 km^{2})
  - Land: 1.46 sq mi (3.78 km^{2})
  - Water: 0 sq mi (0.00 km^{2})
- Elevation: 390 ft (120 m)

Population (2020)
  - Total: 4,967
  - Density: 3,407.5/sq mi (1,315.66/km^{2})
- Time zone: UTC-5 (Eastern (EST))
  - Summer (DST): UTC-4 (EDT)
- ZIP code: 17111
- Area code: 717
- FIPS code: 42-41944
- GNIS feature ID: 1179050

Lawnton is an unincorporated area and census-designated place (CDP) in Swatara Township, Dauphin County, Pennsylvania, United States. The population was 3,813 at the 2010 census. It is part of the Harrisburg–Carlisle Metropolitan Statistical Area.

== Geography ==
Lawnton is located in southern Dauphin County at 40°15′41″N 76°48′11″W (40.261439, -76.803047). It is in northern Swatara Township and is bordered to the east by the community of Rutherford. Interstate 83 forms the western edge of the CDP. Harrisburg, the state capital, is 5 miles (8 km) to the west.

According to the United States Census Bureau, the CDP has a total area of 1.2 square miles (3.0 km^{2}), all land.

== Demographics ==
Historical population
Census	Pop.	Note	%±
2020	4,967		—
U.S. Decennial Census

=== 2020 census ===
As of the 2020 census, Lawnton had a population of 4,967. The median age was 39.8 years. 22.1% of residents were under the age of 18 and 17.5% were 65 years of age or older. For every 100 females, there were 92.7 males, and for every 100 females age 18 and over there were 88.8 males.

100.0% of residents lived in urban areas, while 0.0% lived in rural areas.

There were 1,899 households, of which 32.5% had children under the age of 18 living in them. Of all households, 44.6% were married-couple households, 17.1% were households with a male householder and no spouse or partner present, and 31.5% were households with a female householder and no spouse or partner present. About 29.7% of all households were made up of individuals, and 13.2% had someone living alone who was 65 years of age or older.

There were 2,010 housing units, of which 5.5% were vacant. The homeowner vacancy rate was 0.7% and the rental vacancy rate was 9.4%.

Racial composition as of the 2020 census
Race	Number	Percent
White	2,155	43.4%
Black or African American	1,018	20.5%
American Indian and Alaska Native	20	0.4%
Asian	1,252	25.2%
Native Hawaiian and Other Pacific Islander	0	0.0%
Some other race	204	4.1%
Two or more races	318	6.4%
Hispanic or Latino (of any race)	405	8.2%

=== 2000 census ===
As of the census of 2000, there were 3,787 people, 1,581 households, and 1,054 families residing in the CDP. The population density was 3,342.3 inhabitants per square mile (1,290.5/km^{2}). There were 1,630 housing units at an average density of 1,438.6 per square mile (555.4/km^{2}). The racial makeup of the CDP was 80.09% White, 14.44% African American, 0.08% Native American, 1.77% Asian, 1.35% from other races, and 2.27% from two or more races. Hispanic or Latino of any race were 3.80% of the population.

There were 1,581 households, out of which 33.0% had children under the age of 18 living with them, 48.6% were married couples living together, 14.1% had a female householder with no husband present, and 33.3% were non-families. 28.7% of all households were made up of individuals, and 10.1% had someone living alone who was 65 years of age or older. The average household size was 2.38 and the average family size was 2.92.

In the CDP, the population was spread out, with 25.0% under the age of 18, 8.1% from 18 to 24, 33.2% from 25 to 44, 20.8% from 45 to 64, and 12.9% who were 65 years of age or older. The median age was 37 years. For every 100 females, there were 88.0 males. For every 100 females age 18 and over, there were 84.2 males.

The median income for a household in the CDP was $49,737, and the median income for a family was $57,003. Males had a median income of $42,038 versus $29,125 for females. The per capita income for the CDP was $24,342. About 6.9% of families and 7.4% of the population were below the poverty line, including 11.3% of those under age 18 and 8.4% of those age 65 or over.
