= Capital Beltway (Harrisburg) =

Highway in Pennsylvania

- Capital Beltway highlighted in three colors: red (I-81), green (I-83), and blue (PA 581)

Route information
- Maintained by PennDOT
- Length: 27.6 mi (44.4 km)
- Existed: 1997–present
- Component highways: I-83 from Lemoyne to Colonial Park; US 322 from Lawnton to Harrisburg; I-81 from Colonial Park to Enola; PA 581 from Enola to Lemoyne; US 11 in Camp Hill

Major junctions
- Beltway around Harrisburg
- I-83 in Lemoyne; I-283 / US 322 in Lawnton; I-81 from Colonial Park to Enola

Location
- Country: United States
- State: Pennsylvania
- Counties: Cumberland, Dauphin

Highway system
- Pennsylvania State Route System; Interstate; US; State; Scenic; Legislative
← PA 580	PA 581	→ PA 582

The Capital Beltway is a beltway surrounding Harrisburg, Pennsylvania, in the United States. It is co-designated as Interstate 81 (I-81), I-83, U.S. Route 11 (US 11), US 322, and Pennsylvania Route 581 (PA 581) at various locations along the route. The beltway is primarily located in the suburbs of Harrisburg on both sides of the Susquehanna River; however, part of its southern leg passes along the southern edge of downtown. The southern section of the highway is named the Harrisburg Expressway. Officially designated in 1997, the Beltway is an assemblage of several freeways built over the preceding 45 years.

== Route description ==
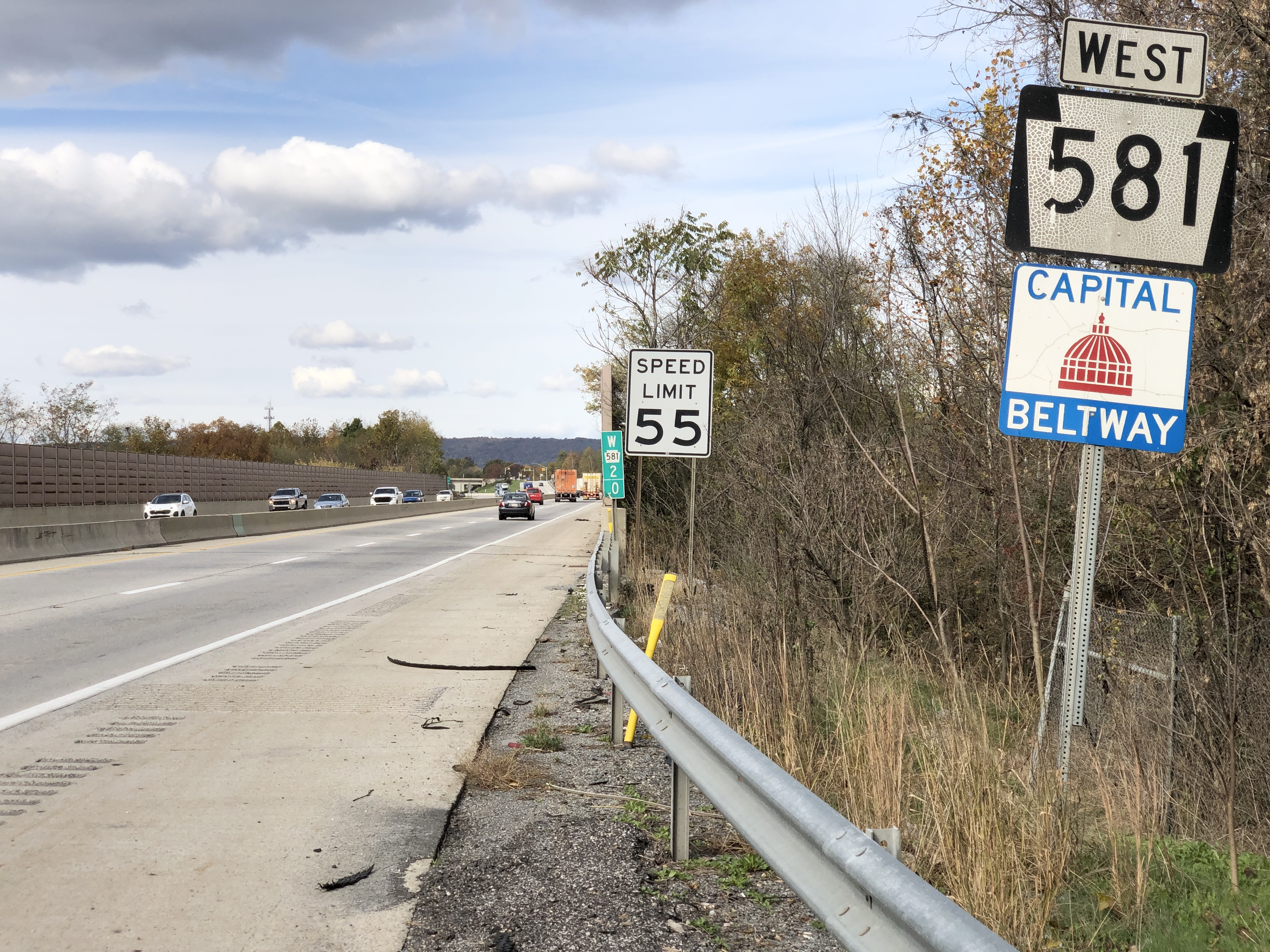
PA 581 westbound along the Capital Beltway past US 11 in Hampden Township

Eastbound from the interchange of PA 581 at I-83 2 miles (3.2 km) west of the city of Harrisburg in the borough of Lemoyne (colloquially known as the "York split"), the beltway crosses the Susquehanna River on the John Harris Bridge, connecting Harrisburg to its West Shore (a colloquialism of the western bank of the Susquehanna across from Harrisburg) suburbs of the city.

Continuing on I-83, the beltway parallels Paxton Street (formerly US 322), passing the former Harrisburg Mall as the road approaches the Eisenhower Interchange. At the junction, the Capital Beltway continues on I-83 as it turns north, while beginning a concurrency with US 322. Continuing for three miles (5 km), I-83 ends at I-81 at an interchange locally known as the "81/83 split". US 322 and the Capital Beltway continue on I-81 south.

On I-81, US 322 exits off I-81 at exit 67B, heading in a northerly direction to State College, beginning a concurrency with US 22 west. Exit 67A is for US 22 east, Cameron Street, which is where the Pennsylvania Farm Show Complex & Expo Center is located (a half mile south of the beltway). The Capital Beltway crosses the Susquehanna River for the second time on the George N. Wade Memorial Bridge. The beltway makes a southerly turn just beyond the bridge, near the western end of the Susquehanna Water Gap of Blue Mountain.

Pennsylvania Route 581
- Location: Hampden Township – Lemoyne
- Length: 7.36 mi (11.84 km)
- Existed: 1992–present

Continuing on I-81 until exit 59, the Capital Beltway exits south onto PA 581. US 11 begins a concurrency with PA 581 starting at exit 3; at exit 5A it exits off and starts a concurrency with US 15 in the borough of Camp Hill. The beltway continues east for two miles (3 km) until it completes the loop by reaching I-83 at the York split.

== History ==
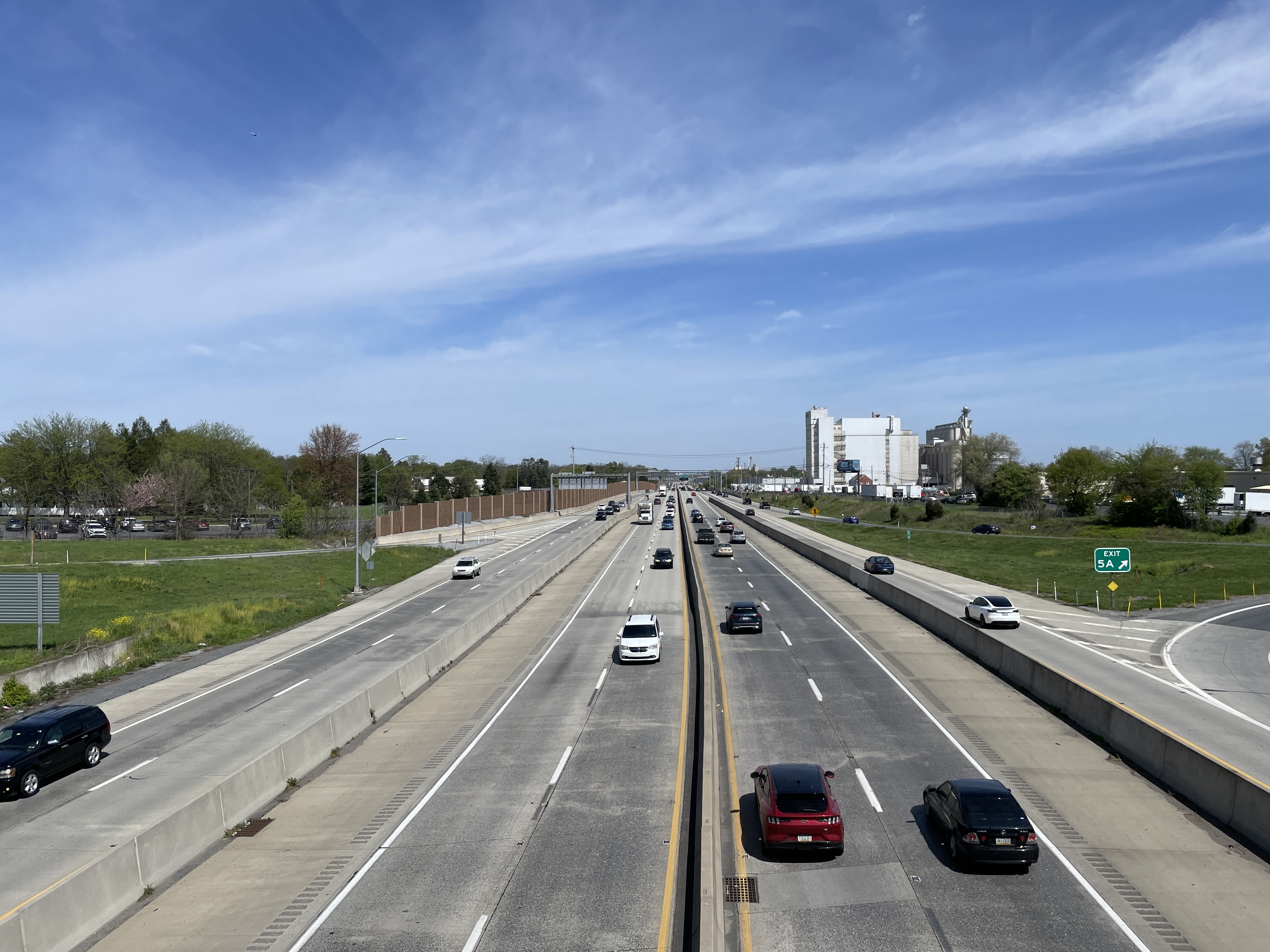
PA 581 eastbound at the US 11/US 15 interchange in Camp Hill

The Capital Beltway was officially designated in 1997, an assemblage of several freeways built over the preceding forty-five years. The earliest parts are its eastern and southern sections. The segment between US 22 in Colonial Park and US 422 on the site of the future Eisenhower Interchange opened in 1954, designated initially as part of Bypass US 230 (PA 230 after 1961). In 1960-61, I-83, the Baltimore-Harrisburg expressway, was extended east from Lemoyne, over the John Harris Bridge to Paxton St. in south Harrisburg. Also opened was a 4.5 mile freeway west from I-83 in Lemoyne to connect with US 15 in Camp Hill and US 11 in Hampden Township, where those highways were entering what was then the western edge of the metropolitan area. The new east-west freeway was called the Harrisburg Expressway. (Upon its opening, US 11 was rerouted to follow the Expressway from the Hampden terminus to Camp Hill, and thence up 32nd St to Market St. where it rejoined its old path. In 1992, the whole segment of the Expressway west of the York Split in Lemoyne was designated PA 581.)

In 1968-71, I-83 was extended from Paxton Street east and north via the new Eisenhower Interchange. PA 230 to Colonial Park was redesignated I-83 and extended a mile further north to link with the new, temporary, southern terminus of I-81. In 1971-75, I-81 was built between Colonial Park and Carlisle, its final section in Pennsylvania to be completed. But I-81 on the west shore had no convenient connections with the Harrisburg Expressway which ran parallel five miles to its south. Indeed, for years the edge of the Harrisburg area inset on Pennsylvania highway maps ran no further west than Camp Hill and Enola, showing US 11-15 as the primary north–south route between the two highways on the west shore.

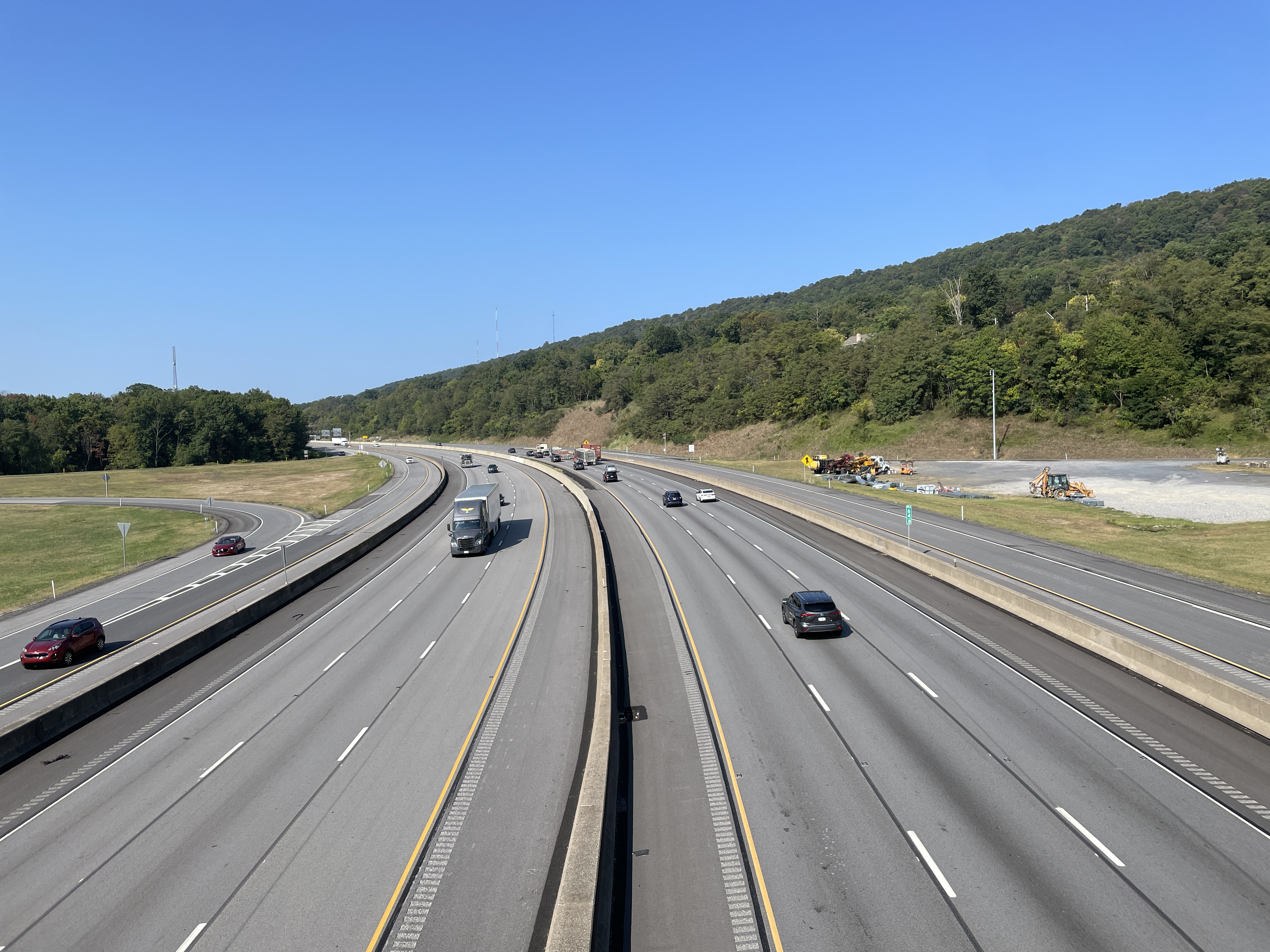
I-81 southbound on the Capital Beltway at the US 11/US 15 interchange in East Pennsboro Township

Not until 1995 did work begin on the 3-mile section of PA 581 between the Harrisburg Expressway terminus and I-81 in the Good Hope area of Hampden Township. Engineering for the project was provided by Gannett Fleming and McCormick Taylor of Camp Hill. When it was opened for public use in 1997, the Capital Beltway designation was assigned to all its current components.

On May 9, 2013, a tanker crashed and caught fire at the interchange between I-81 and US 22/US 322 in Harrisburg. The fire damaged the bridges carrying westbound US 22/US 322 and a ramp over I-81. At least one of those bridges, carrying US 22 eastbound over I-81 and several ramps, and possibly another, the ramp carrying traffic from I-81 northbound to US 22/US 322 westbound, will have to be demolished and replaced. The fire resulted in about ten miles of I-81, from the PA 581 interchange to the I-83 interchange, being closed in both directions, with traffic being diverted along the southern portion of the Capital Beltway.

== Exit list ==
Mileposts follow individual component highways.

County	Location	mi	km	Old exit	New exit	Destinations	Notes
Cumberland	Lemoyne	41.41	66.64	20	6 (EB); 41A (WB)	I-83 south to I-76 / Penna Turnpike – Lemoyne, York, Baltimore	East end of PA 581 overlap; west end of I-83 overlap; signed as exits 6B (I-83) and 6C (Lemoyne) eastbound; no westbound access to Lemoyne
Cumberland	Lemoyne	41.438	66.688	22	41B	Lemoyne	Westbound exit and eastbound entrance; access via Lowther Street
Susquehanna River		42.006– 42.636	67.602– 68.616	John Harris Bridge			
Dauphin	Harrisburg	42.671	68.672	23	43	2nd Street – Capitol	Semi-directional T interchange; serves Harrisburg Transportation Center
Dauphin	Harrisburg	43.149	69.442	24	44A	13th Street to PA 230	
Dauphin	Harrisburg	43.450	69.926	25	44B	17th Street	Westbound exit and entrance
Dauphin	Harrisburg	43.653	70.253	25	44B	19th Street	Eastbound exit and entrance
Dauphin	Harrisburg	44.658	71.870	26	45	To Paxton Street	Northbound exit and entrance; access via 32nd Street
Dauphin	Harrisburg	45.512	73.244	26	45	Paxton Street / Bass Pro Drive	Southbound exit and entrance
Dauphin	Swatara Township	45.927	73.912	27	46A	I-283 south to I-76 / Penna Turnpike – Harrisburg International Airport, Lancaster	Northern terminus and exits 3A-B on I-283; Eisenhower Interchange
Dauphin	Swatara Township	46.852	75.401	28	46B (EB); 47 (SB)	US 322 east / Eisenhower Boulevard – Hershey	South end of US 322 overlap; Eisenhower Blvd. not signed eastbound
Dauphin	Lower Paxton Township	47.940	77.152	29	48	Union Deposit Road	
Dauphin	Lower Paxton Township	49.220	79.212	30	50	US 22 (Jonestown Road)	
Dauphin	Lower Paxton Township	50.21 69.70	80.81 112.17	25	51B (NB); 70 (EB)	I-81 north to I-78 – Hazleton, Allentown I-83 ends	North end of I-83 overlap; east end of I-81 overlap
Dauphin	Susquehanna Township	68.70	110.56	24	69	Progress Avenue	Serves Widener University
Dauphin	Susquehanna Township	67.13	108.04	23	67	US 22 / US 322 west to PA 230 east (Cameron Street) – Lewistown, State College	West end of US 322 overlap; signed as exits 67B (west) and 67A (east); serves Harrisburg Area Community College
Dauphin	Susquehanna Township	65.97	106.17	22	66	Front Street – Downtown Harrisburg	Serves Harrisburg Transportation Center
Susquehanna River				George N. Wade Memorial Bridge			
Cumberland	East Pennsboro Township	64.78	104.25	21	65	US 11 / US 15 – Enola, Marysville	Serves Central Penn College; signed as exits 65B (north) and 65A (south)
Cumberland	Hampden Township	60.85	97.93	20	61	PA 944 (Wertzville Road)	
Cumberland	Hampden Township	59.13 0.00	95.16 0.00		59 (WB); 1B (NB)	I-81 south – Carlisle PA 581 begins	West end of I-81 overlap; north end of PA 581 overlap
Cumberland	Hampden Township	1.00	1.61		2	Creekview Road	
Cumberland	Hampden Township	2.10	3.38		3	US 11 south (Carlisle Pike)	West end of US 11 overlap
Cumberland	Camp Hill	4.09	6.58		4	PA 641 – Mechanicsburg	Westbound exit and eastbound entrance
Cumberland	Camp Hill	5.07	8.16		5	US 11 north / US 15 – Camp Hill, Gettysburg	Partial cloverleaf interchange; east end of US 11 overlap; signed as exits 5B (south) and 5A (north)
Cumberland	Lemoyne	7.36	11.84	20	6 (EB); 41A (WB)	I-83 south to I-76 / Penna Turnpike – Lemoyne, York, Baltimore PA 581 ends	East end of PA 581 overlap; west end of I-83 overlap; signed as exits 6B (I-83) and 6C (Lemoyne) eastbound; no westbound access to Lemoyne
1.000 mi = 1.609 km; 1.000 km = 0.621 mi: Concurrency terminus; Incomplete access

== See also ==
- Capital Beltway, in the Washington, D.C. metropolitan area
