= Skirmish of Sporting Hill =

Battle of the American Civil War

- Part of the American Civil War
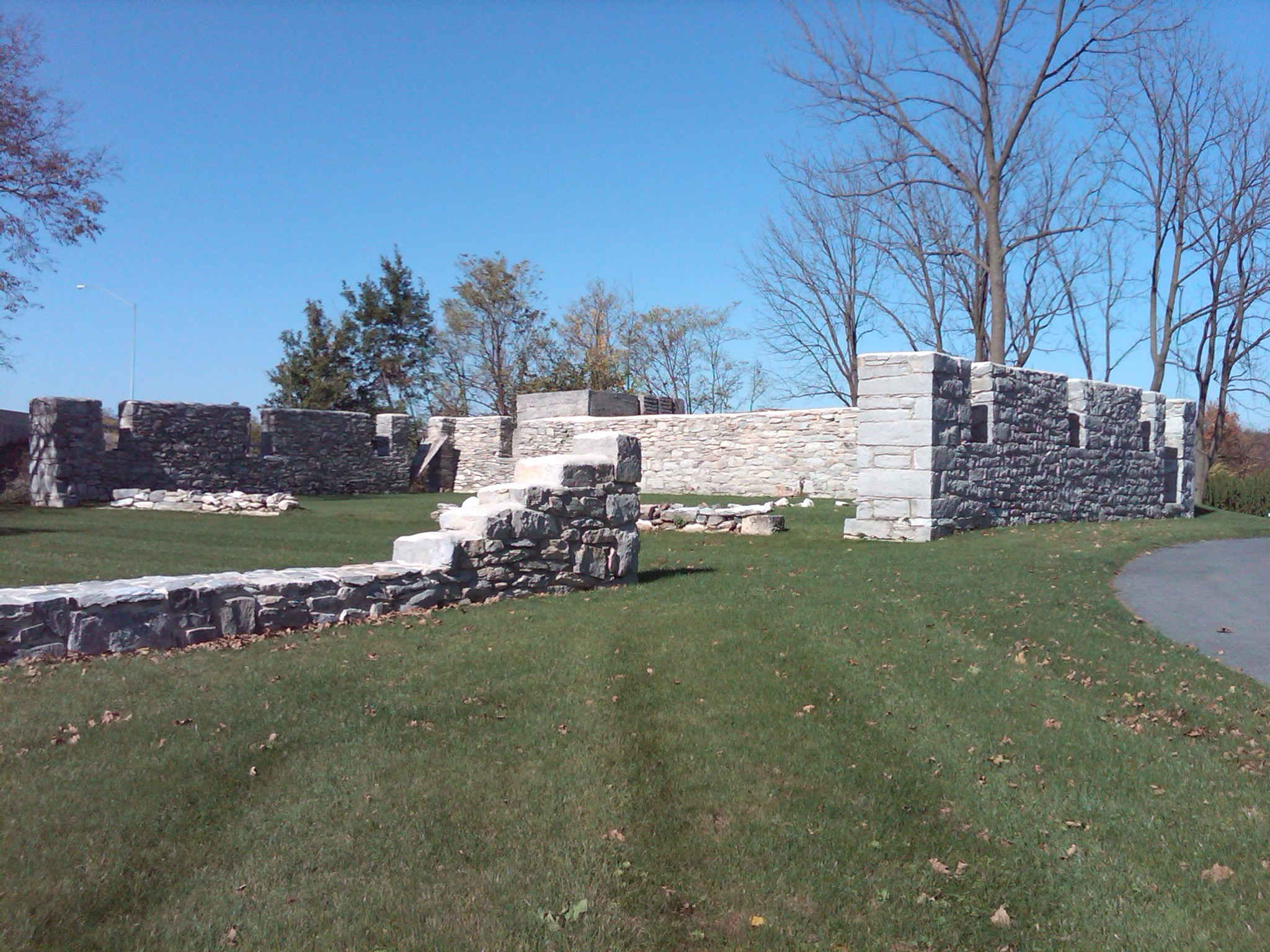
- The Eberly Barn foundation, site of the skirmish
Date	June 30, 1863
Location	Camp Hill, Pennsylvania; Hampden Township, Pennsylvania; East Pennsboro Township, Pennsylvania 40°14′25″N 76°58′41″W
Result	Union Victory

Belligerents
United States	Confederate States

Commanders and leaders
Darius N. Couch	Albert G. Jenkins

Strength
Elements of Pennsylvania and New York state militia	Elements of the 16th Virginia Cavalry Regiment

Casualties and losses
11 wounded	16 dead 20–30 wounded

The Skirmish of Sporting Hill was a relatively small skirmish during the Gettysburg campaign of the American Civil War, taking place on June 30, 1863, at various locations in present-day Camp Hill, East Pennsboro Township and Hampden Township in Cumberland County, Pennsylvania. It is known as the northernmost engagement of Robert E. Lee's Army of Northern Virginia during the Civil War.

== Background ==
Confederate Lt. Gen. Richard S. Ewell had led two full divisions and a cavalry brigade through Maryland into Mechanicsburg, Pennsylvania in late June 1863, with the intention of seizing the state capital of Harrisburg. However, he had been significantly delayed in crossing the rain-swollen Potomac River, which allowed time for the Union to respond. Pausing another day at Chambersburg, Ewell finally marched northwards through the Cumberland Valley towards Harrisburg.

In response, Union Maj. Gen. Darius N. Couch, commanding the Department of the Susquehanna, dispatched troops to the present-day borough of Camp Hill, located in the Cumberland Valley approximately 2 miles (3 km) west of Harrisburg. Laborers hired by Couch quickly erected earthworks and fortifications along the western portion of Bridgeport, adjacent to Camp Hill. The two largest of these became known as "Fort Couch" and "Fort Washington".

== Skirmish ==
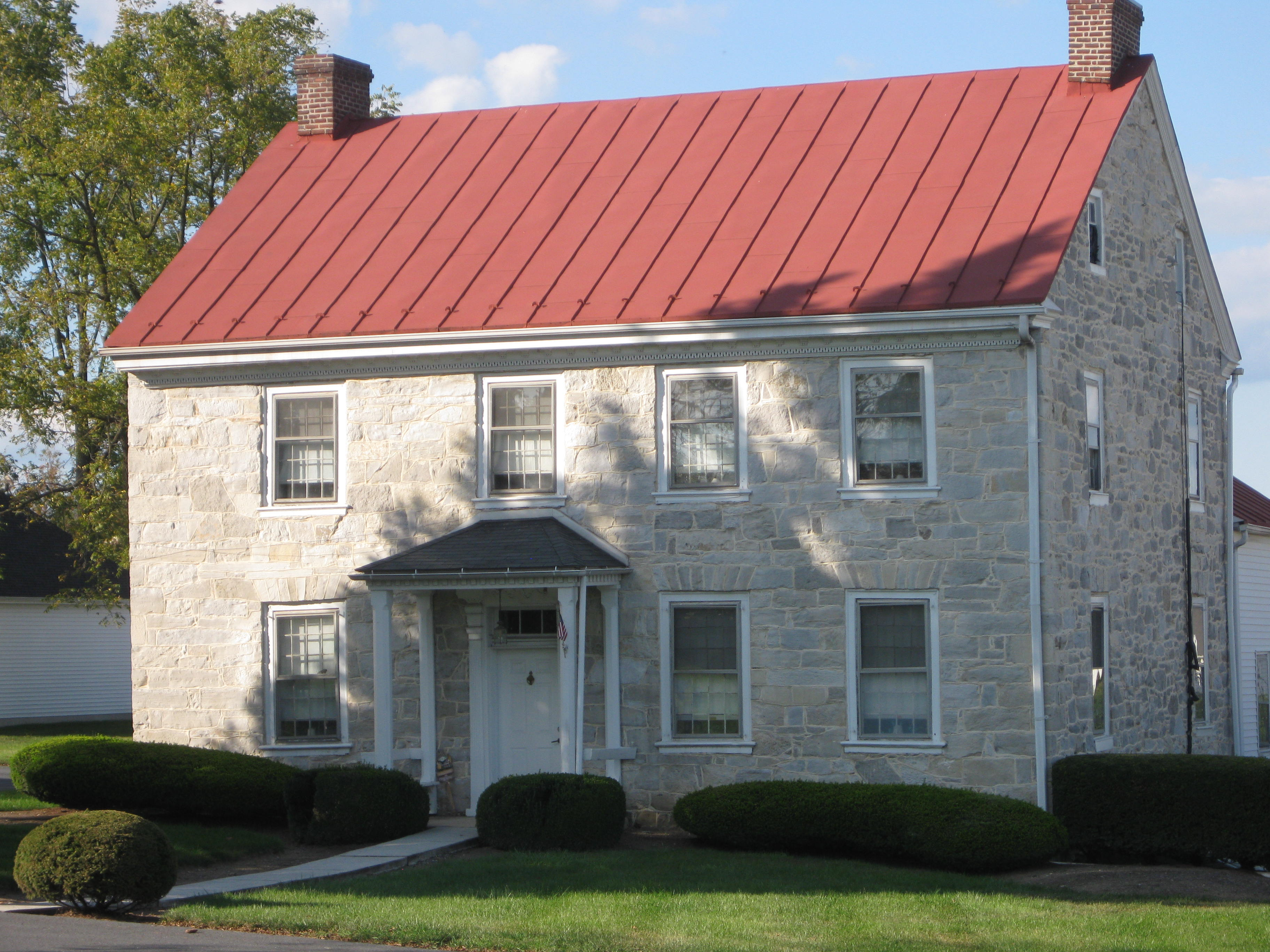
Johannes Eberly House

Ewell's cavalry, a brigade under the command of Brig. Gen. Albert G. Jenkins, raided nearby Mechanicsburg on June 28. That same evening, receiving the unexpected news that the Federal Army of the Potomac was rapidly advancing through Maryland, Gen. Robert E. Lee was forced to consolidate his Army of Northern Virginia towards Gettysburg to counter this new threat. As a result, Ewell began to withdraw, and would never realize the objective of taking Harrisburg.

However, Jenkins briefly skirmished with the 22nd and 37th New York Militia at Sporting Hill on the west side of Camp Hill on June 29, 1863. The Confederates used the barn of the Johannes Eberly House, also known as the McCormick House, as cover while engaging the Union soldiers positioned along the Carlisle Pike. The Confederates attempted to cross the Carlisle Pike and outflank the Union soldiers but the Union soldiers saw their maneuvering and stymied their efforts. The Confederate soldiers began artillery fire upon the Union position with shot and shell around 5 p.m. Just then, Lieutenant Perkins of the Federal Army arrived with two cannon and began firing upon the Eberly House's barn. The Federals' very first shot at the barn smashed through the upper wooden structure and sent approximately 50 Confederate soldiers running outside to their horses. The Confederates withdrew in the direction of Carlisle to rejoin Ewell's infantry for the march southward towards Heidlersburg and Gettysburg.

== Aftermath ==
At least 16 Confederates from the 16th and 36th Virginia Cavalry were killed during the fighting and an additional 20 to 30 were wounded. Union losses were listed at 11 men wounded.

== Preservation efforts ==
Some of the battlefield was lost to development and the construction of PA Route 581. A Pennsylvania Historical and Museum Commission historical marker, denoting the skirmish, exists at the intersection of 31st Street and Market Streets in Camp Hill. The wooden part of the Eberly barn, where the Confederate soldiers were positioned, was destroyed by a tornado on March 21, 1976, but the barn's limestone foundation still remains. Both the Eberly barn foundation and the Eberly House itself are still standing, as they were preserved by real estate developer Tom Gaughen, who built the nearby Brambles apartment complex that encircles the house.
