= New Kingstown, Pennsylvania =

Unincorporated community in Pennsylvania, US

- Census-designated place
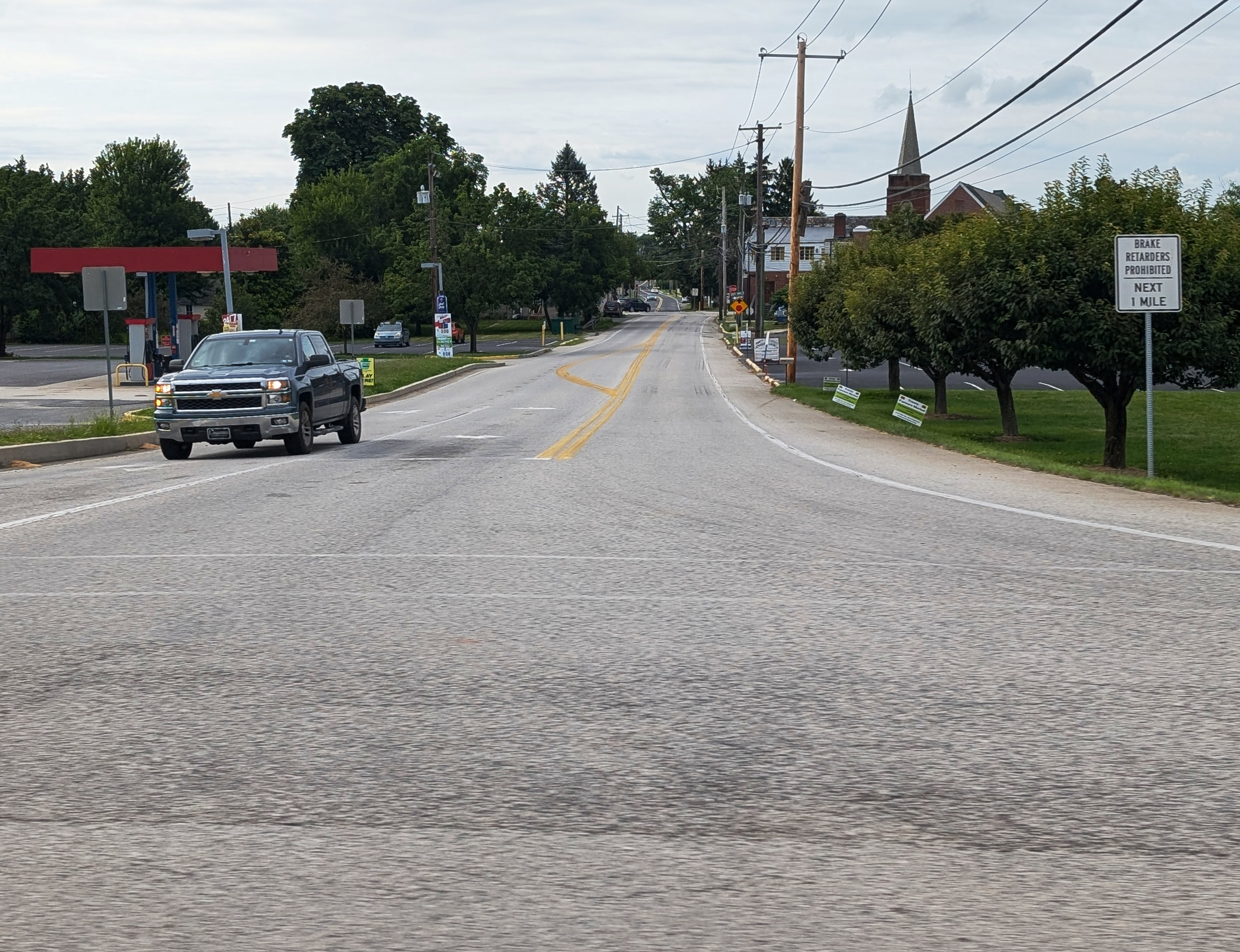
- North Locust Point Road in New Kingstown

- Location within the U.S. state of Pennsylvania New Kingstown (the United States)
- Coordinates: 40°14′4″N 77°4′37″W
- Country: United States
- State: Pennsylvania
- County: Cumberland
- Township: Silver Spring

Area
  - Total: 1.59 sq mi (4.13 km^{2})
  - Land: 1.59 sq mi (4.13 km^{2})
  - Water: 0 sq mi (0.00 km^{2})

Population (2020)
  - Total: 709
  - Density: 445.1/sq mi (171.86/km^{2})
- Time zone: UTC-5 (Eastern (EST))
  - Summer (DST): UTC-4 (EDT)
- ZIP Code: 17072
- FIPS code: 42-53752
- GNIS feature ID: 1182341

New Kingstown is a census-designated place (CDP) in Silver Spring Township, Pennsylvania, United States. The population was 495 at the 2010 census. It is part of the Harrisburg–Carlisle metropolitan statistical area.

== Geography ==
New Kingstown is located southwest of the center of Silver Spring Township at 40°14′4″N 77°4′37″W (40.234457, -77.077072), along U.S. Route 11 (Carlisle Pike). US 11 leads west 7.5 miles (12.1 km) to the center of Carlisle, the Cumberland County seat, and east 14 miles (23 km) to Harrisburg, the state capital.

According to the U.S. Census Bureau, the New Kingstown CDP has a total area of 1.6 square miles (4.1 km^{2}), all land.

== Demographics ==
Historical population
Census	Pop.	Note	%±
2020	709		—
U.S. Decennial Census

As of the census of 2000, there were 539 people, 222 households, and 158 families residing in the CDP. The population density was 339.2 inhabitants per square mile (131.0/km^{2}). There were 243 housing units at an average density of 152.9 per square mile (59.0/km^{2}). The racial makeup of the CDP was 94.06% White, 0.37% African American, 1.11% Native American, 1.48% Asian, 2.23% from other races, and 0.74% from two or more races. Hispanic or Latino of any race were 2.60% of the population.

There were 222 households, out of which 31.5% had children under the age of 18 living with them, 59.0% were married couples living together, 8.1% had a female householder with no husband present, and 28.8% were non-families. 25.2% of all households were made up of individuals, and 7.7% had someone living alone who was 65 years of age or older. The average household size was 2.43 and the average family size was 2.84.

In the CDP, the population was spread out, with 24.1% under the age of 18, 5.8% from 18 to 24, 31.7% from 25 to 44, 27.5% from 45 to 64, and 10.9% who were 65 years of age or older. The median age was 38 years. For every 100 females, there were 96.0 males. For every 100 females age 18 and over, there were 91.1 males.

The median income for a household in the CDP was $46,652, and the median income for a family was $44,844. Males had a median income of $31,958 versus $25,608 for females. The per capita income for the CDP was $29,541. None of the families and 1.0% of the population were living below the poverty line, including no under eighteens and none of those over 64.

== Education ==
The school district is the Cumberland Valley School District.
