= Cumberland Valley School District =

School district in Pennsylvania

Coordinates: 40.23839°N 77.06065°W

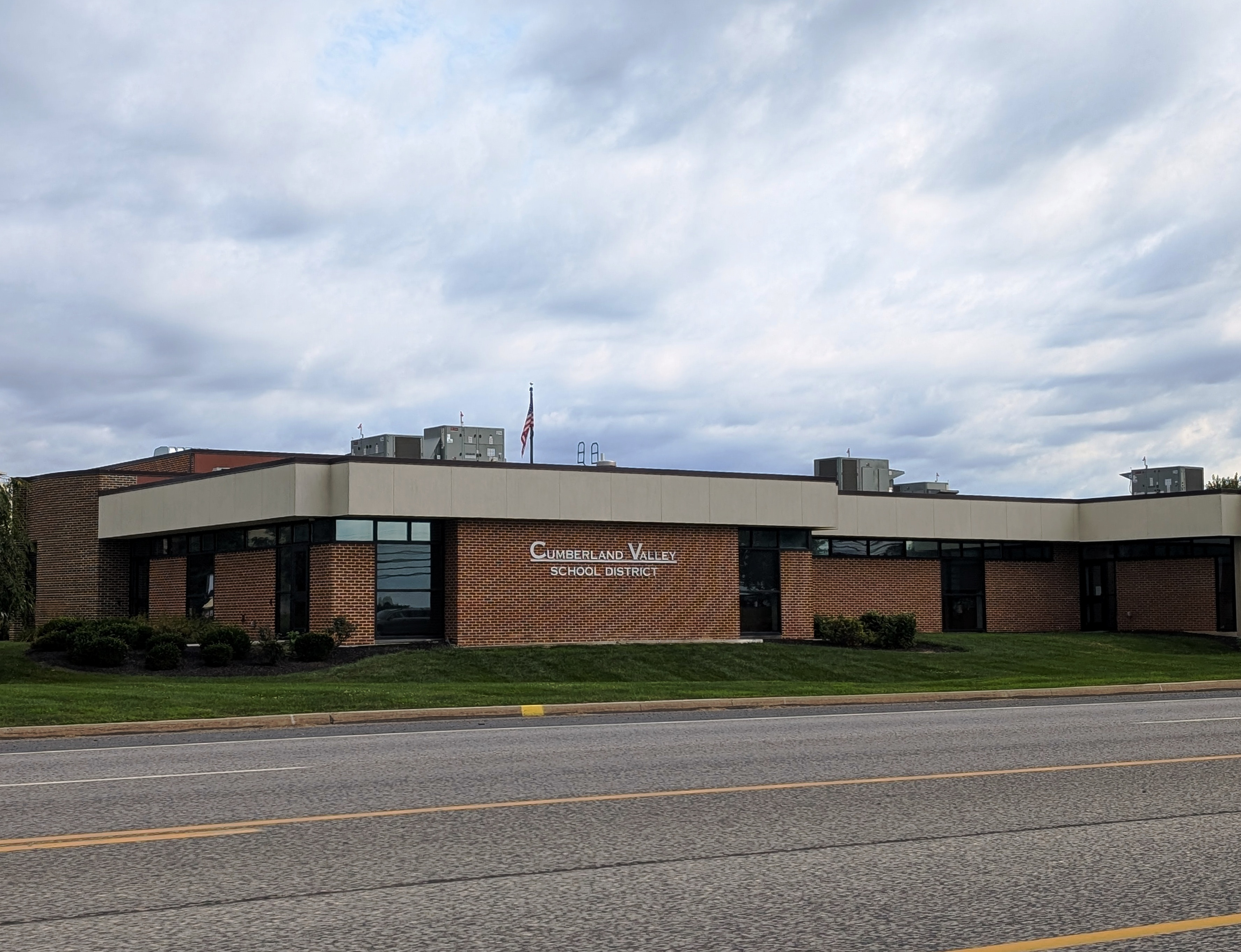
- District offices

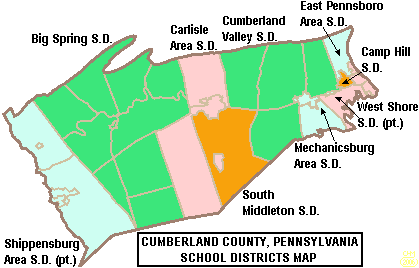

Address
- 6746 Carlisle Pike Mechanicsburg, Cumberland County, Pennsylvania, 17050-1711; United States

District information
- Type: Public

Students and staff
- District mascot: Eagles
- Colors: Red and white

Other information
- Website: cvschools.org

The Cumberland Valley School District is a large, rural and suburban public school district located in Central Pennsylvania. It covers Hampden Township, Monroe Township, Middlesex Township and Silver Spring Township in Cumberland County, Pennsylvania. According to 2000 federal census data, it served a resident population of 46,926. By 2010, the district's population increased to 54,670 people. In 2009, the district residents’ per capita income was $28,440, while the median family income was $66,515. In the Commonwealth, the median family income was $49,501 and the United States median family income was $49,445, in 2010. By 2013, the median household income in the United States rose to $52,100.

The district is served by the Capital Area Intermediate Unit 15, which offers a variety of services, including a completely developed K-12 curriculum that is mapped and aligned with the Pennsylvania Academic Standards (available online), shared services, a group purchasing program and a wide variety of special education and special needs services.

The district includes the New Kingstown census-designated place and a portion of the Schlusser census-designated place.

== History ==
David Christopher served as superintendent until December 1, 2023, as Christopher became the superintendent of the West Chester Area School District. On December 4 of that year, Mark Blanchard became the superintendent.

On April 15, 2024, the school board unanimously voted to cancel an appearance by actor Maulik Pancholy to read his book "The Best At It" to students at Mountain View Middle School. The board later voted 5–4 on April 24 to reverse the previous vote and reinstate his appearance after local parents protested the first vote.

== Schools ==
Cumberland Valley School District operates eight Elementary Schools (K-5th), two Middle Schools (6th-8th) and Cumberland Valley High School (9th-12th).

- Cumberland Valley High School
- Cumberland Valley Ninth Grade Academy
- Eagle View Middle School
- Mountain View Middle School
- Good Hope Middle School (Now used as a 9th Grade Academy)
- Green Ridge Elementary School
- Hampden Elementary School
- Middlesex Elementary School
- Monroe Elementary School
- Shaull Elementary School
- Silver Spring Elementary School
- Sporting Hill Elementary School
- Winding Creek Elementary School

== Extracurriculars ==
Cumberland Valley School District also provides a wide variety of clubs, activities and an extensive sports program. Varsity and junior varsity athletic activities are under the Pennsylvania Interscholastic Athletic Association.

=== Sports ===
The District funds: High School:

Boys

- Baseball - AAAA
- Basketball- AAAA
- Bowling - AAAA
- Cross Country - AAA
- Football - AAAAAA
- Golf - AAA
- Lacrosse - AAAA
- Soccer - AAA
- Swimming and Diving - AAA
- Tennis - AAA
- Track and Field - AAA
- Volleyball - AAA
- Water Polo - AAAA
- Wrestling - AAA

Girls

- Basketball - AAAA
- Bowling - AAAA
- Cross Country - AAA
- Competitive chess - AAAA
- Field Hockey - AAA
- Golf - AAA
- Lacrosse - AAAA
- Soccer (Fall) - AAA
- Softball - AAAA
- Swimming and Diving - AAA
- Girls' Tennis - AAA
- Track and Field - AAA
- Volleyball - AAA
- Water Polo - AAAA

Middle School Sports:

Boys

- Basketball
- Cross Country
- Soccer
- Track and Field

Girls

- Basketball
- Cross Country
- Field Hockey
- Track and Field
- Volleyball

According to PIAA directory July 2012
