= McCormick Taylor =

Philadelphian consultancy

McCormick Taylor, Inc.
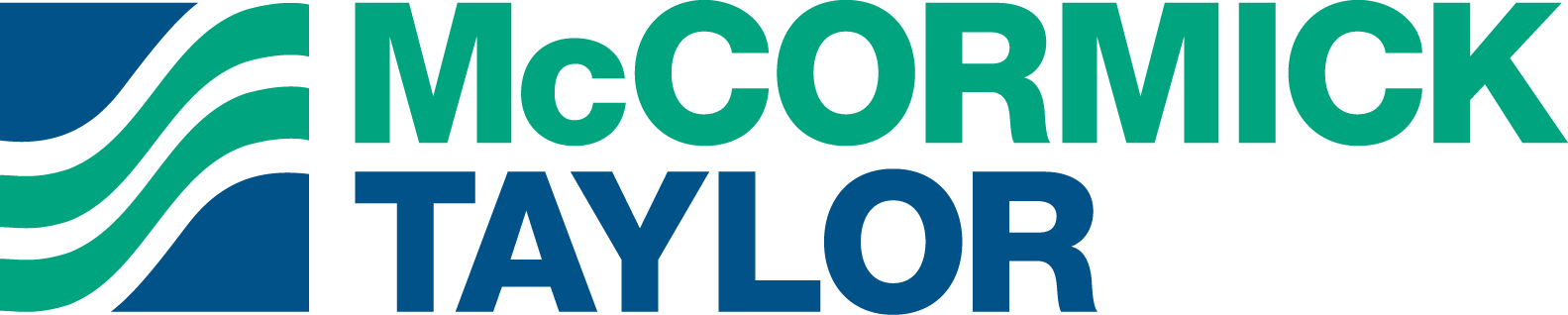
- Company type: Private company
- Industry: Professional services
- Founded: 1946 in Philadelphia, Pennsylvania, United States
- Founder: Thomas J. McCormick, Paul G. Taylor
- Headquarters: Philadelphia, Pennsylvania, United States
- Key people: James C. Wiggans, P.E. (Co-owner, CEO); Patrick J. Guise (Co-owner, CVO)
- Services: Engineering, consulting, environmental services
- Number of employees: 500
- Website: www.mccormicktaylor.com

McCormick Taylor, Inc. (formerly known as McCormick Taylor & Associates, Inc., or MTA) is an American consulting firm based in Philadelphia. The company specializes in energy services, water resources, civil design, planning, environmental studies, and communications for transportation development projects.

The firm employs more than 500 professionals in 20 offices, and its clients include state departments of transportation (DOTs), metropolitan planning organizations (MPOs), turnpike authorities, counties, municipalities, and energy/utility companies.

== History ==
The firm was established in 1946 by Thomas J. McCormick, P.E., an engineer and professor in Philadelphia. He was joined by Paul G. Taylor in the early 1950s. Together, they formed McCormick Taylor & Associates.

In the 1970s, the firm shifted focus toward transportation planning and design, and began employing a multi-disciplinary approach to projects. The result was that McCormick Taylor emerged in the 1980s as a full-service consulting engineering and environmental planning firm focused on transportation projects.

The firm changed its name to McCormick Taylor, Inc. in 2004, resulting in a new logo.

In 2011, James C. Wiggans, P.E. and Patrick J. Guise, ventured into partnership. From 2014-2015, the firm grew from 12 offices to 20, and ventured into four new states; Arizona, North Carolina, South Carolina, and then, Florida.

Since 2011, the company has increased its technical staff levels by nearly 20 percent. McCormick Taylor also expanded into new markets, growing from predominantly transportation-related work for the public sector to permitting and environmental monitoring activities for private energy and utility companies.
