= Silver Spring Township, Pennsylvania =

Township in Pennsylvania, US

Coordinates: 40°13′00″N 77°02′59″W

- Township
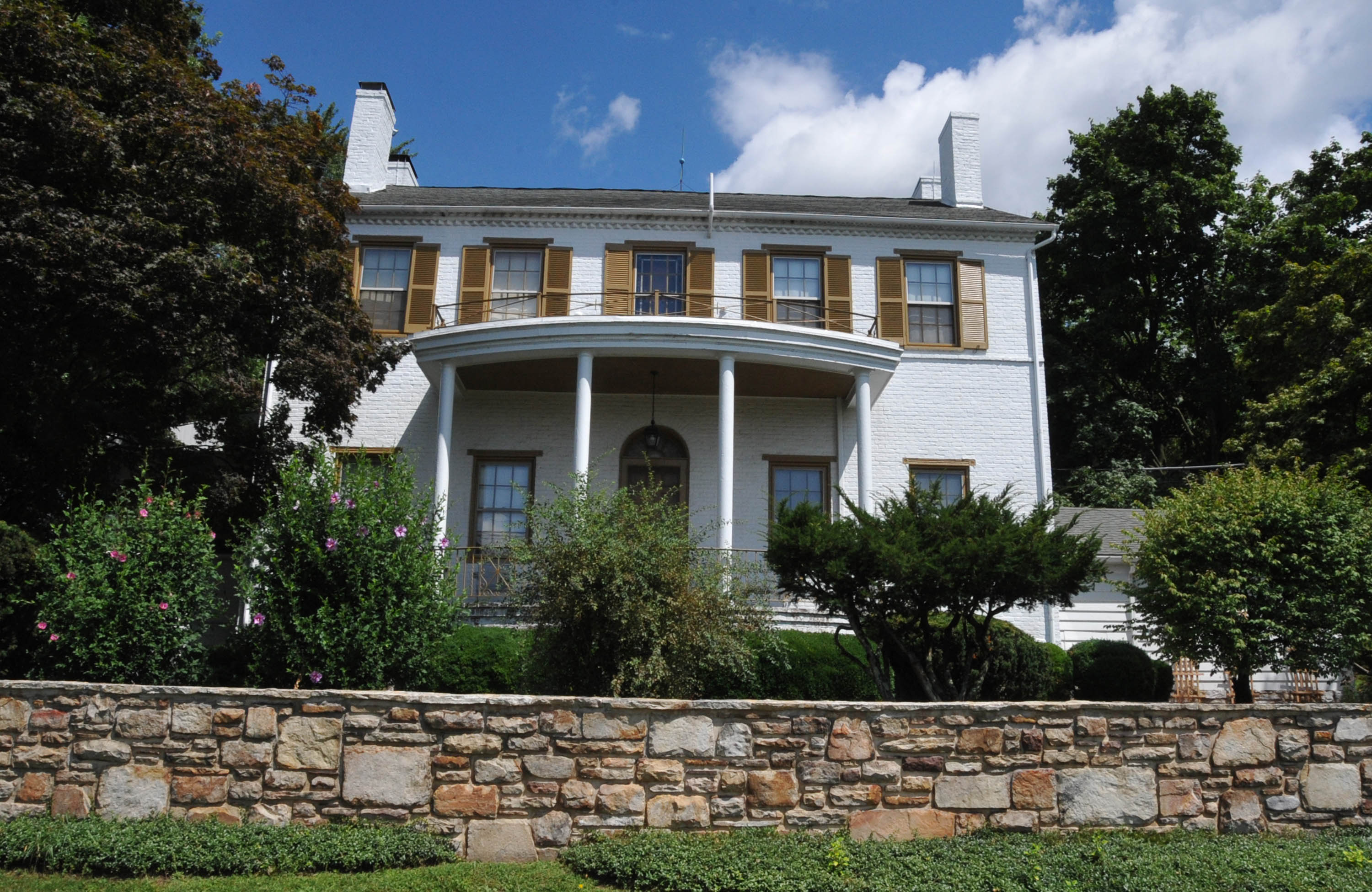
- George Trimble House, built 1812

- Flag Seal
- Motto: "Suburban Serenity with Urban Proximity"
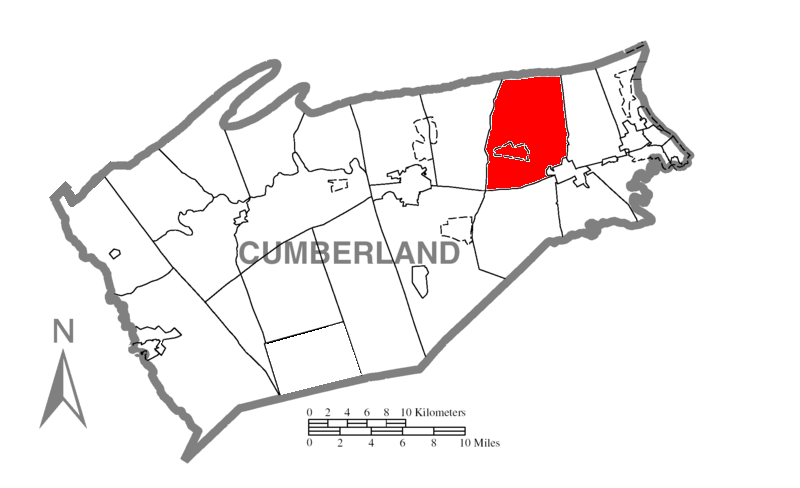
- Map of Cumberland County, Pennsylvania highlighting Silver Spring Township

- Map of Cumberland County, Pennsylvania
- Country: United States
- State: Pennsylvania
- County: Cumberland

Government
  - Type: Board of Supervisors
  - Chair: Carl Machamer
  - Vice Chair: Nancy Konhaus Griffie
  - Supervisor: List of Township Supervisors: Laura Brown; Harry Kotzmoyer, Jr.; David Lanker, II

Area
  - Total: 32.82 sq mi (85.01 km^{2})
  - Land: 32.31 sq mi (83.69 km^{2})
  - Water: 0.51 sq mi (1.31 km^{2})

Population (2010)
  - Total: 13,657
  - Estimate (2019): 18,314
  - Density: 566.8/sq mi (218.83/km^{2})
- Time zone: UTC-5 (Eastern (EST))
  - Summer (DST): UTC-4 (EDT)
- Area code: 717
- FIPS code: 42-041-70792
- Website: www.sstwp.org

Historical population
Census	Pop.	Note	%±
2000	10,592		—
2010	13,657		28.9%
2019 (est.)	18,314		34.1%
U.S. Decennial Census

Silver Spring Township is a township in Cumberland County, Pennsylvania, United States. The population was 13,657 at the 2010 census, up from 10,592 at the 2000 census.

== Geography ==
The township is in northeastern Cumberland County and is bordered to the north by Perry County, the border following the ridgecrest of Blue Mountain. The southeastern corner of the township borders the borough of Mechanicsburg.

Conodoguinet Creek, a tributary of the Susquehanna River, crosses the center of the township from west to east, making several long bends. Interstate 81 also crosses the center of the township, with access from Exit 57, Pennsylvania Route 114. U.S. Route 11 crosses the township south of I-81, passing through the two main unincorporated communities in the township, Hogestown and New Kingstown. The Pennsylvania Turnpike (Interstate 76) crosses the southwest corner of the township but without any direct access.

According to the United States Census Bureau, the township has a total area of 32.8 square miles (85.0 km^{2}), of which 32.3 square miles (83.7 km^{2}) is land and 0.50 square miles (1.3 km^{2}), or 1.55%, is water.

unincorporated communities in Silver Spring Township:

- Dillsburg Junction
- Hogestown
- Locust Point
- New Kingstown, a census-designated place
- Roxbury
- Wertzville

== Demographics ==
As of the census of 2000, there were 10,592 people, 4,061 households, and 3,102 families residing in the township. The population density was 325.8 inhabitants per square mile (125.8/km^{2}). There were 4,185 housing units at an average density of 128.7 per square mile (49.7/km^{2}). The racial makeup of the township was 96.15% White, 0.37% African American, 0.08% Native American, 2.30% Asian, 0.04% Pacific Islander, 0.30% from other races, and 0.76% from two or more races. Hispanic or Latino of any race were 0.73% of the population.

There were 4,061 households, out of which 34.1% had children under the age of 18 living with them, 67.6% were married couples living together, 6.1% had a female householder with no husband present, and 23.6% were non-families. 19.7% of all households were made up of individuals, and 8.2% had someone living alone who was 65 years of age or older. The average household size was 2.60 and the average family size was 3.00.

In the township the population was spread out, with 25.6% under the age of 18, 5.1% from 18 to 24, 29.5% from 25 to 44, 27.4% from 45 to 64, and 12.4% who were 65 years of age or older. The median age was 40 years. For every 100 females there were 96.2 males. For every 100 females age 18 and over, there were 93.4 males.

The median income for a household in the township was $54,932, and the median income for a family was $63,828. Males had a median income of $45,152 versus $29,821 for females. The per capita income for the township was $31,728. About 1.4% of families and 2.4% of the population were below the poverty line, including 1.8% of those under age 18 and 5.3% of those age 65 or over.

== Education ==
Silver Spring Township is served by the Cumberland Valley School District. Cumberland Valley High School is located within the township.

== Retail ==
Many major retail shopping developments are located in Silver Spring township. Most are located along the highly traveled Carlisle Pike (U.S. Route 11) which serves as a major traffic route through the township connecting it to nearby Hampden Township, the most populous township in Cumberland County.

- Cumberland Marketplace
- Silver Spring Commons
- Silver Spring Square

== Township agencies ==
- Board of Supervisors
- Zoning Hearing Board
- Planning Commission
- New Kingstown Vision Committee
- Recreation Advisory Council
- Emergency Management Council
- Agricultural Security Council
- Conservation and Preservation Committee
- Veterans Memorial Committee
- Board of Auditors
- Board of Police Pension
- Authority (Sewer)

== Advisory boards, committees and councils ==
- Agricultural Security Area Committee
- Business Advisory Council
- Conservation & Preservation Committee
- Emergency Management Agency
- Hogestown Heritage Committee
- Land Preservation Review Board
- New Kingstown Vision Committee
- Planning Commission
- Recreational Advisory Council
- Sewer Authority Board
- Veteran's Memorial Committee
- Zoning Hearing Board
