= Pennsylvania Route 39 =

State highway in Dauphin County, Pennsylvania, United States

Pennsylvania Route 39
- PA 39 highlighted in red

Route information
- Maintained by PennDOT
- Length: 17.829 mi (28.693 km)
- Existed: May 1, 1937–present

Major junctions
- West end: SR 3009 in Susquehanna Township
- US 22 / US 322 in Susquehanna Township; I-81 in West Hanover Township; US 22 in West Hanover Township
- East end: US 322 / US 422 in Derry Township

Location
- Country: United States
- State: Pennsylvania
- Counties: Dauphin

Highway system
- Pennsylvania State Route System; Interstate; US; State; Scenic; Legislative
← PA 38	→ US 40

Pennsylvania Route 39 (PA 39) is a 17.83-mile-long (28.69 km) state highway located in Dauphin County, Pennsylvania, United States. PA 39 runs from State Route 3009 (SR 3009, North Front Street) in Susquehanna Township near Harrisburg east to U.S. Route 322 (US 322) and US 422 in Derry Township near Hummelstown and Hershey. The route passes through the northern and eastern suburbs of Harrisburg and passes by Hersheypark, Giant Center, as well as the primary production factory for The Hershey Company. Between Harrisburg and Manada Hill, it is known as Linglestown Road, from Manada Hill to Hershey as Hershey Road and from Hershey to near Hummelstown and Hershey as Hersheypark Drive. Prior to the establishment of PA 39 in 1937, PA 39, had previously been designated as a route in northeastern Pennsylvania during the 1920s. That designation was deleted when it was renumbered US 11. As a result, PA 39 is one of a few routes which has a set of child routes which are nowhere near the primary route.

The Linglestown–Manada Hill portion of PA 39 was originally part of Legislative Route 140 (LR 140), one of hundreds of unsigned legislative routes created by the Sproul Road Bill in 1911. LR 140 was later rerouted to bypass Linglestown to the south, and the Paxtonia–Lower Paxton Township portion of its former routing became LR 140A. This legislative route was initially signed solely as PA 894. PA 39 was assigned in the 1930s to the portion of LR 140A east of Linglestown—overlapping PA 894—and also to LR 22006 between the Susquehanna River and Manadahill. The PA 894 designation was later removed.

PA 39 was extended southward to the vicinity of Hummelstown in two stages. The first extension during the mid-1940s shifted PA 39's eastern terminus to the junction of Hershey Road and Allentown Boulevard (US 22) south of Manadahill. Its terminus was moved to its present location in the early 1960s. Only local realignments and improvements have occurred since.

== Route description ==
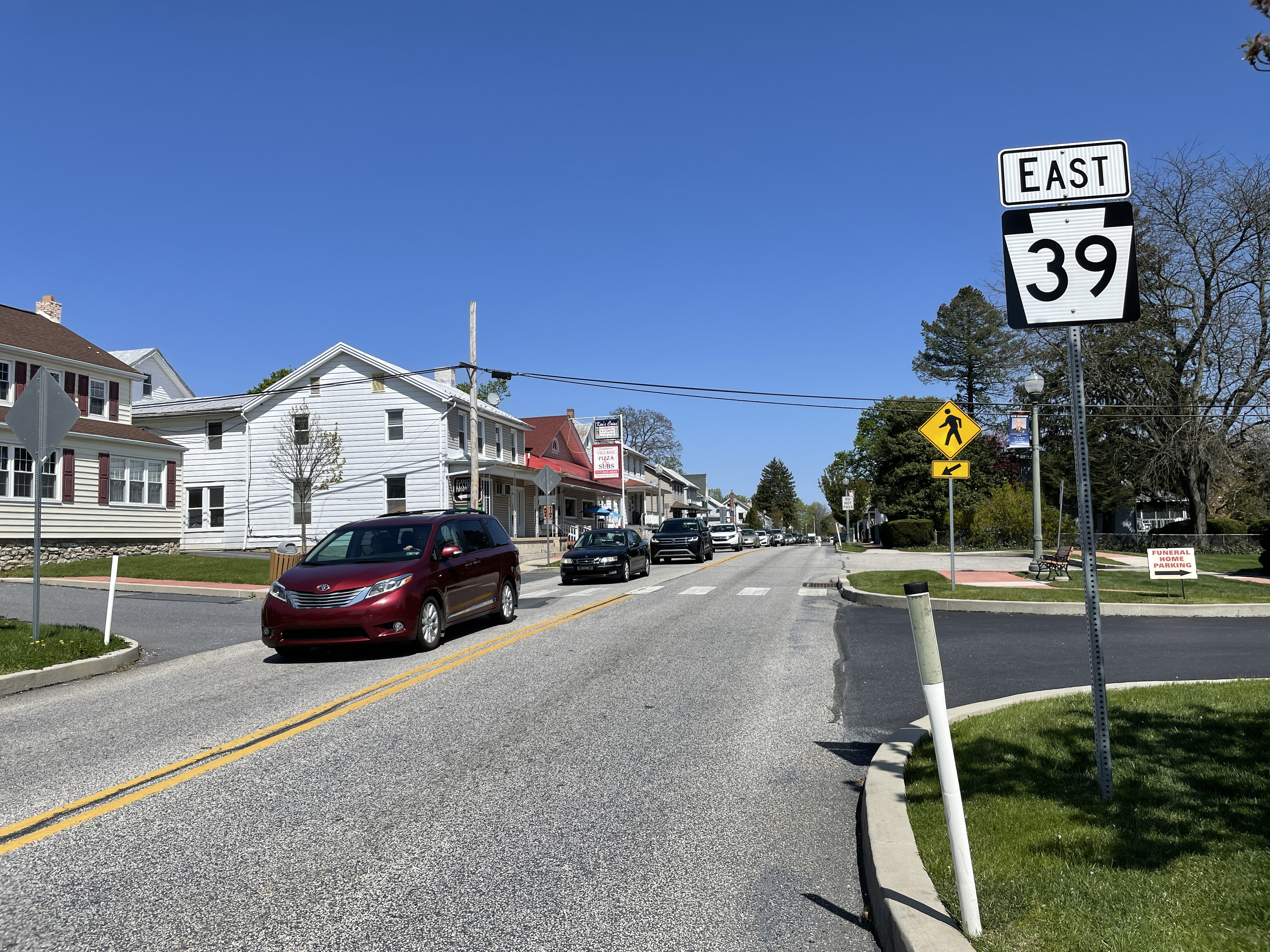
PA 39 eastbound in Linglestown

PA 39 begins at an intersection with SR 3009 (North Front Street) on the east bank of the Susquehanna River in Susquehanna Township, Dauphin County, north of the city of Harrisburg. It heads northeast as Linglestown Road through a densely populated neighborhood known as Lucknow, with the Capital Area Greenbelt trail following the road, and widens from two to four lanes as it passes over Norfolk Southern Railway's Pittsburgh Line. The trail splits south at the Industrial Road intersection before PA 39 approaches an interchange with the US 22/US 322 freeway at the northern tip of Wildwood Lake. East of the exit, the highway reverts to two lanes and passes through the predominantly residential northern suburbs of Harrisburg. It intersects North Progress Avenue prior to passing into Lower Paxton Township.

West of the village of Linglestown, Linglestown Road intersects Colonial Road, and then continues east to Linglestown, where it intersects North Mountain Road at a roundabout. Outside of the village, the amount of development along the highway declines as the route passes through areas of forests and open fields, crossing Beaver Creek. Continuing east, the road becomes more developed as it approaches an interchange with Interstate 81 (I-81) at exit 77. Just east of the interchange, PA 39 intersects Jonestown Road and changes names from Linglestown Road to Hershey Road.

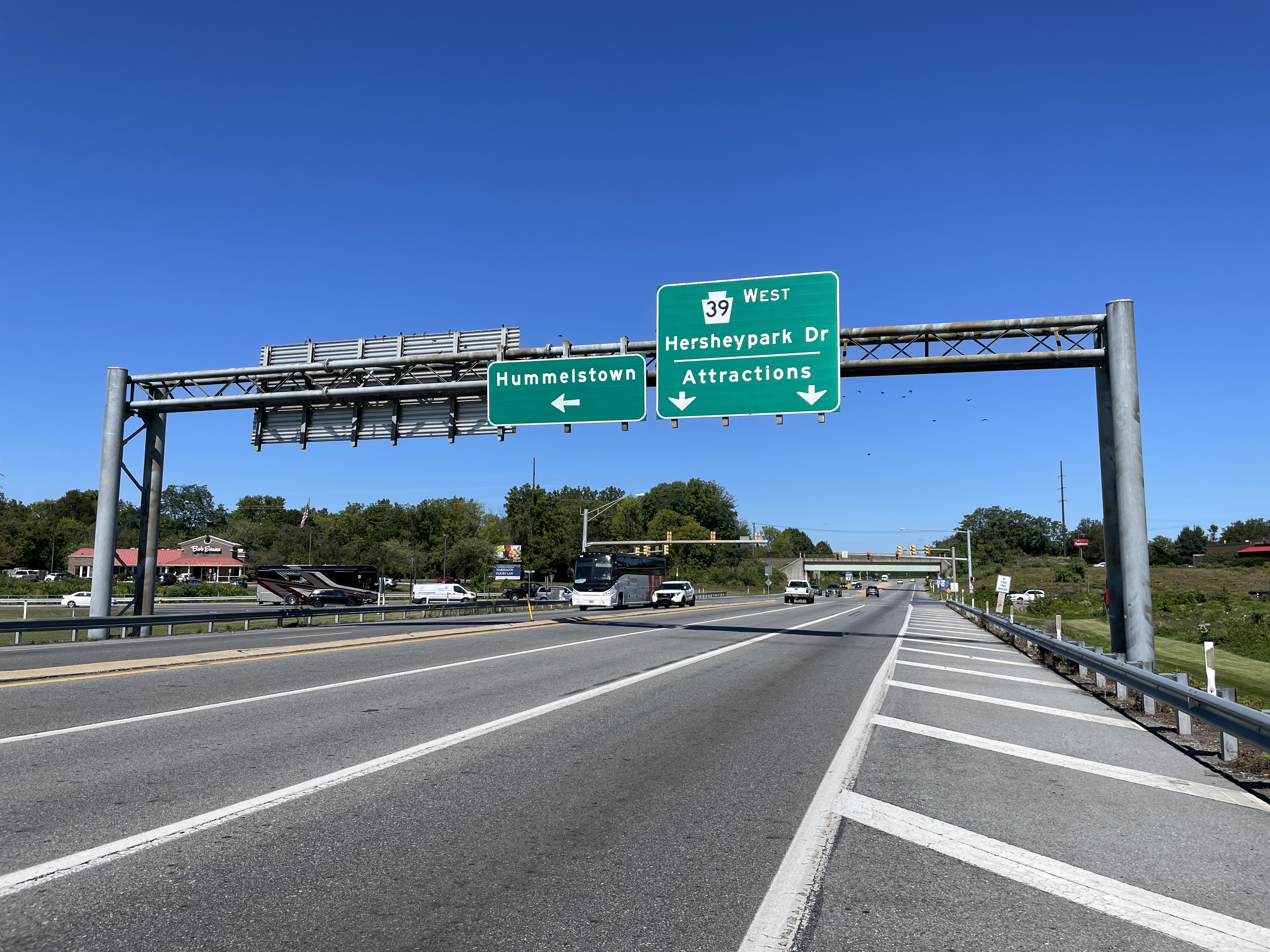
PA 39 westbound past eastern terminus at US 322 and US 422 near Hummelstown

Unlike Linglestown Road, which followed a mostly east–west alignment, Hershey Road has a north–south orientation. It heads south from Jonestown Road to intersect US 22, here an at-grade roadway named Allentown Boulevard, near Skyline View. Hershey Road continues onward, snaking southeastward through a rural region of Dauphin County to the vicinity of Hershey. During this stretch, it passes through South Hanover Township and serves the communities of Hanoverale and Union Deposit. The route crosses into Derry Township after crossing over Swatara Creek, then intersects Hersheypark Drive near the creek's southern bank. Hershey Road continues south from here as Park Boulevard, a service road for the Hersheypark amusement park, Hersheypark Stadium, Hersheypark Arena, The Star Pavilion, Giant Center (where the Hershey Bears of the American Hockey League play), and Hershey's Chocolate World; however, the route veers westward onto Hersheypark Drive and bypasses Giant Center to the north. This portion of the road is four lanes wide, the first significant portion of PA 39 to be that many lanes wide since the area surrounding I-81.

PA 39 heads south bypassing the village of Hershey to the north and west. It passes under Norfolk Southern Railway's Harrisburg Line, then enters a highly developed area east of the borough of Hummelstown. Here, the road intersects Walton Avenue, a local street connecting Hersheypark Drive to the village. This is the final junction along PA 39 as the route ends 0.3 miles (480 m) later at a modified cloverleaf interchange with US 322 and US 422.

== History ==
=== Legislative Routes ===
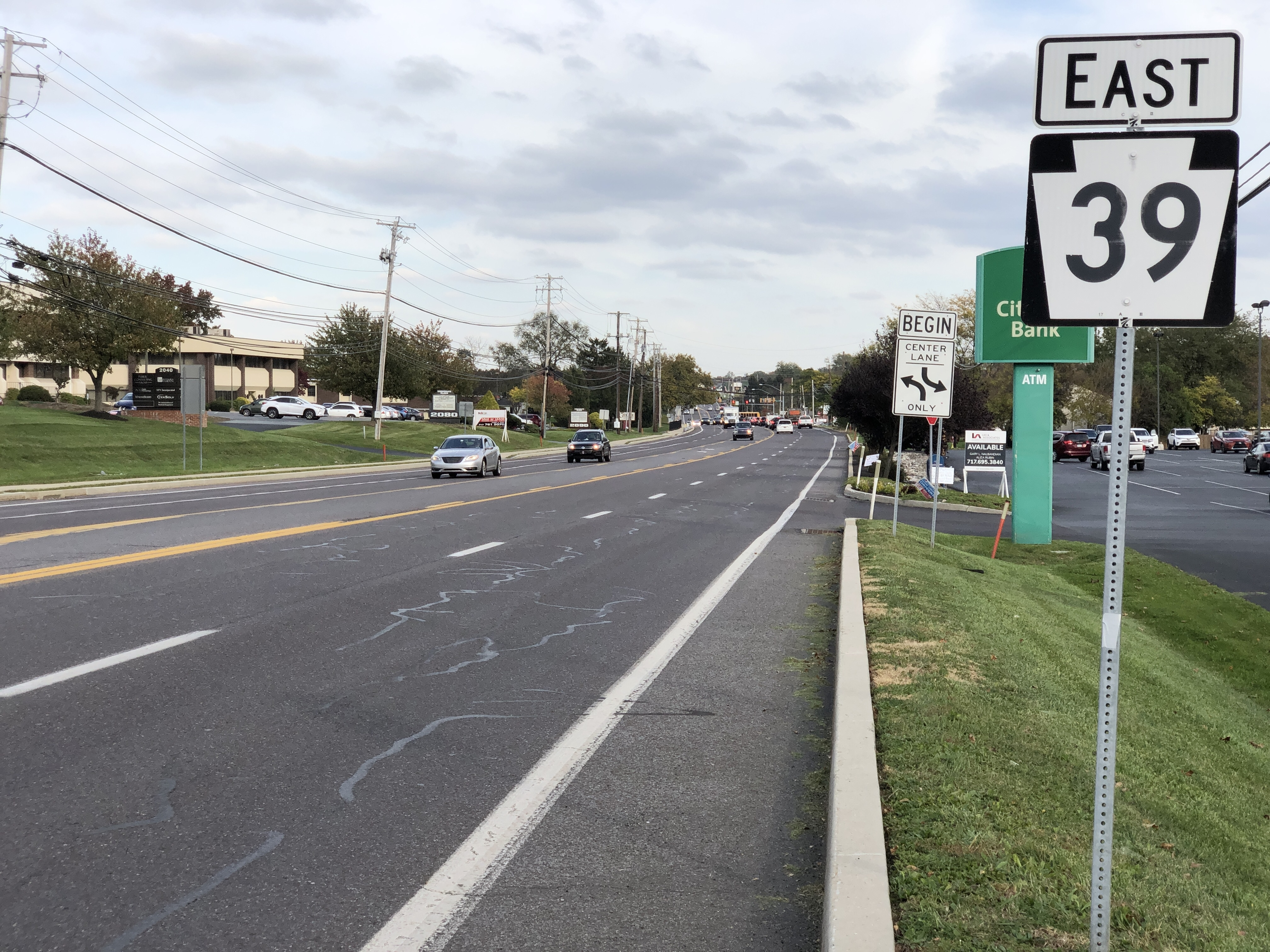
PA 39 eastbound in Susquehanna Township

LR 140, an unsigned legislative route extending from Harrisburg in the west to Pottsville in the east, was created on May 31, 1911, through the Sproul Road Bill, which established the initial set of legislative routes throughout Pennsylvania. LR 140 entered Linglestown on North Mountain Road, then turned to follow modern PA 39 from Linglestown to Manadahill, where it veered onto Jonestown Road. LR 140 was realigned by 1926 to follow a direct route between Paxtonia and Manadahill via Jonestown Road. The portion of former LR 140 from Paxtonia to the Lower Paxton–West Hanover township line was then redesignated as LR 140A. All of LR 140A was designated as the signed PA 894 by 1930.

In the Omnibus Road Bill Act of 1931, LR 22006 was established, spanning the portion of current PA 39 from the Susquehanna River north of Harrisburg to Hanoverdale at the West Hanover–South Hanover township line, three miles north of Union Deposit. The remainder of current PA 39 north of Swatara Creek was a state-aid route designated A-306, which ran from South Hanover Township to Union Deposit. Those sections of roads were paved in 1926, in preparation for gaining state aid.

==== Original Route 39 ====
Prior to 1937, the Route 39 designation was assigned at least once. From 1913 to 1924, it was assigned to the Philadelphia and Pittsburgh Pike from Bedford to Everett. The Philadelphia and Pittsburgh Pike became part of the Lincoln Highway in the same year. In 1925, Route 39 was deleted and renumbered as Pennsylvania Route 1. It was then renumbered as U.S. Route 30 in 1927.

=== Designation ===
PA 39 was assigned on May 1, 1937, by the Pennsylvania Department of Highways to the portion of LR 22006 between the Susquehanna River (at North Front Street) and Manada Hill and to the section of LR 140A east of Linglestown, overlapping PA 894 along the latter. PA 894 was also extended northward along Piketown Road to a junction with PA 443 near Piketown. The overlap between PA 39 and PA 894 was eliminated in the 1940s when the entirety of the PA 894 designation was removed.

Two years after PA 39 was assigned, the Harrisburg Regional Planning Commission issued a report drafted by Harrisburg city planner Malcolm H. Dill that addressed transportation needs for the Harrisburg region. The Dill plan proposed rerouting US 22 along Linglestown Road from Harrisburg to Manadahill, replacing PA 39. Ultimately the Dill plan was not selected by PennDOH and PA 39 was not deleted.

=== Extensions ===
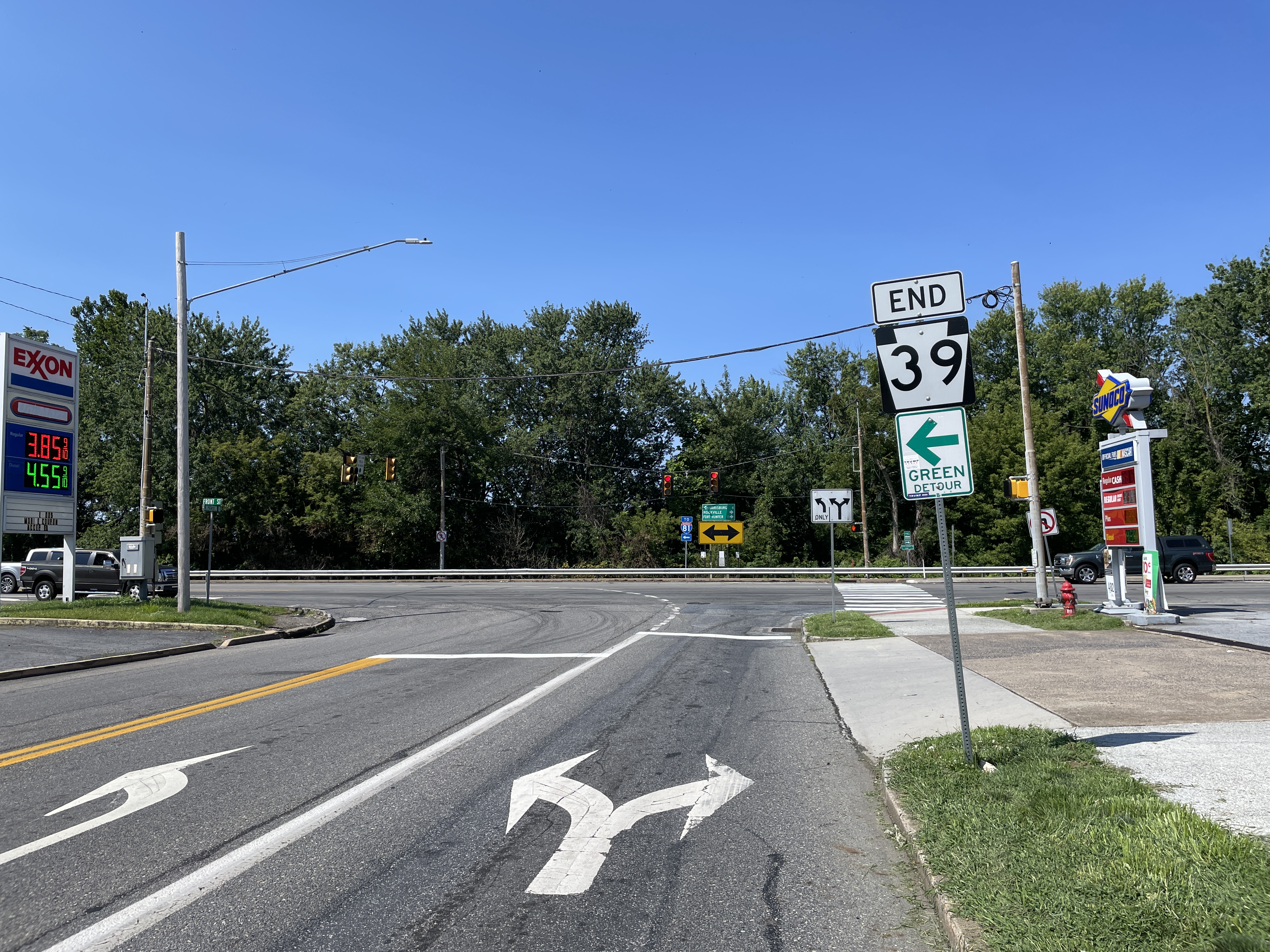
PA 39 westbound approaching its terminus at North Front Street in Susquehanna Township

The first change to PA 39's routing came in the 1940s. During this time, US 22 was rerouted through Dauphin and Lebanon counties to follow Allentown Boulevard instead of Jonestown Road. As a result, PA 39 was extended a short distance southward along LR 22006 on what is now Jonestown Road, Harper Drive, and Hershey Road to meet the new alignment of US 22 south of Manadahill. This section of PA 39 was rerouted in 1969 when a new road was constructed between Jonestown Road and Manada View Drive which directly connected Linglestown Road to Hershey Road. The alignment on Jonestown Road and what became Harper Drive was deleted.

PA 39 was extended further southward on LR 22006 and A-306, as well as parts of Legislative Routes 22011 and 22013, in 1961, to a new terminus at US 322 and US 422 near Hummelstown. At the time, it was routed on Hanover Street in the vicinity of Union Deposit. The portion of Hanover Street south of Canal Street (between Canal Street and West Derry Road - today part of Hersheypark Drive) had previously been part of PA 340 from the 1930s to the early-to-mid-1950s. The portion of the route between Old Chocolate Avenue and Walton Avenue near Hummelstown and Hershey had previously been part of US 422 from 1927 to 1952.

A new highway around the eastern fringe of Union Deposit was constructed in 1968 and opened to traffic as a realignment of PA 39, later that year. Park Boulevard in Hershey was rerouted in 1973 to intersect the new bypass and provide a direct connection between Hersheypark and PA 39.

=== Rehabilitation projects ===
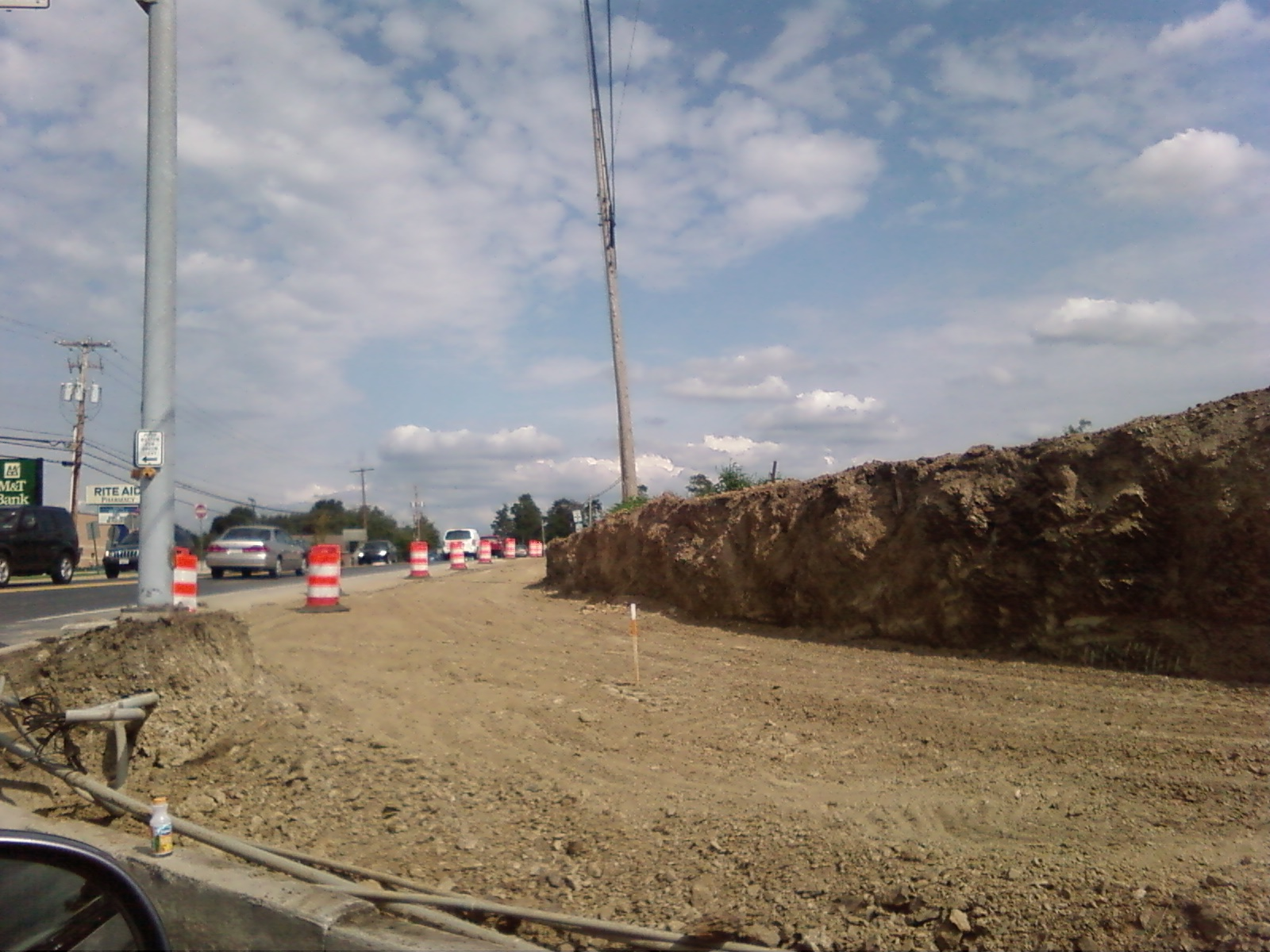
Road widening at the intersection of PA 39 and Progress Avenue, from September 2009.

In the early 1970s, the portion of PA 39 in Susquehanna Township from North Sixth Street to Laurelwood Drive was converted from a two-lane roadway to a four-lane divided highway as part of the construction of the US 22/US 322 bypass. The divided highway was extended west to North Front Street in the early 1990s. To the southeast, the segment of PA 39 south of West Chocolate Avenue near Hummelstown was rebuilt as a divided highway ca. 1990. All of Hersheypark Drive east to Laudermilch Road was converted into a divided highway by 1995. The piece of PA 39 near I-81 was reconstructed into a four-lane divided roadway ca. 1990.

In 2009, PA 39 was widened to five lanes (two lanes in each direction with a center turning lane) when a new shopping center near the intersection of PA 39 and Progress Avenue was built. At the same time, West Hanover Township made improvements to the area surrounding PA 39's interchange with I-81. Prior to the improvements, there was only one traffic light in the vicinity, located at Jonestown Road. Several traffic lights and two additional lanes with a center concrete barrier was added to handle the increased truck traffic caused by the construction of warehouses nearby in 2003 and 2004.

PA 39 was also improved in Linglestown square, when two roundabouts were installed between 2009 and 2011.

== Major intersections ==
The entire route is in Dauphin County.

Location	mi	km	Destinations	Notes
Susquehanna Township	0.000	0.000	SR 3009 (North Front Street) to I-81 – Harrisburg, Rockville, Fort Hunter	Western terminus; former routing of US 22 / US 322
Susquehanna Township–Harrisburg line	0.426	0.686	US 22 / US 322 to I-81 – Lewistown, Harrisburg	Interchange
West Hanover Township	9.769– 9.780	15.722– 15.739	I-81 – Allentown, Hazleton, Harrisburg	Exit 77 (I-81)
West Hanover Township	11.111	17.881	US 22 (Allentown Boulevard) – Allentown, Harrisburg	Former eastern terminus of PA 39
Derry Township	17.829	28.693	US 322 to I-83 / Penna Turnpike – Ephrata, Harrisburg US 422 east (Chocolate Avenue) – Hershey	Eastern terminus; western terminus of eastern segment of US 422; interchange
1.000 mi = 1.609 km; 1.000 km = 0.621 mi
