= Manada =

Manada may refer to:

- Manada Creek, a tributary of Swatara Creek in Dauphin County, Pennsylvania
- Manada Gap, Pennsylvania, an unincorporated community in Dauphin County
- Manada Hill, Pennsylvania, an unincorporated community in East Hanover Township, Dauphin County
- USS Manada (YTB-224), a Cahto-class district harbor tug
- La Manada rape case, Spain, 2016

== See also ==
- Manadas, a civil parish in the municipality of Velas in the Azores
