= East Hanover Township, Pennsylvania =

East Hanover Township is the name of some places in the U.S. state of Pennsylvania:

- East Hanover Township, Dauphin County, Pennsylvania
- East Hanover Township, Lebanon County, Pennsylvania

== See also ==
- Hanover Township, Pennsylvania (disambiguation)
- New Hanover Township, Pennsylvania
- South Hanover Township, Pennsylvania
- Upper Hanover Township, Pennsylvania
- West Hanover Township, Pennsylvania
