= Hanoverdale, Pennsylvania =

Unincorporated community in Pennsylvania, U.S.

Coordinates: 40.321°N 76.704°W

Hanoverdale is an unincorporated community in West Hanover Township, Dauphin County, Pennsylvania, United States, and is part of the Harrisburg-Carlisle Metropolitan Statistical Area.

Hanoverdale is located southeast of Skyline View at the intersection of Hershey Road and Devonshire Heights Road.
