= Hanover Township, Pennsylvania =

Hanover Township is the name of some places in the U.S. state of Pennsylvania:

- Hanover Township, Beaver County, Pennsylvania
- Hanover Township, Lehigh County, Pennsylvania
- Hanover Township, Luzerne County, Pennsylvania
- Hanover Township, Northampton County, Pennsylvania
- Hanover Township, Washington County, Pennsylvania

== See also ==
- East Hanover Township, Pennsylvania (disambiguation)
- New Hanover Township, Pennsylvania
- South Hanover Township, Pennsylvania
- Upper Hanover Township, Pennsylvania
- West Hanover Township, Pennsylvania
- Hanover, Pennsylvania
