= Pennsylvania House of Representatives, District 105 =

American legislative district

Pennsylvania's 105th State House of Representatives district
Representative
Justin C. Fleming; D–Susquehanna Township, Dauphin County
- Population (2020) • Citizens of voting age: 62,825; 49,619

The 105th Pennsylvania House of Representatives District is located in South Central Pennsylvania and has been represented since 2023 by Justin C. Fleming.

== District profile ==
The 105th Pennsylvania House of Representatives District is located in Dauphin County. It includes Sand Beach. It is made up of the following areas:

- Dauphin County
  - Lower Paxton Township (PART)
    - Precincts 01, 02, 05, 06, 07, 08, 10, 11, 12, 13, 14, 17, 18, 20, 23, 25, and 26
  - Susquehanna Township
  - Penbrook

== Representatives ==
Representative	Party	Years	District home	Note
Prior to 1969, seats were apportioned by county.
Miles B. Zimmerman, Jr.	Republican	1969 – 1974		
Joseph C. Manmiller	Republican	1975 – 1988		
Ron Marsico	Republican	1989 – 2018	Harrisburg	
Andrew Lewis	Republican	2019 – 2023	Lower Paxton Township	
Justin C. Fleming	Democrat	2023 – present	Susquehanna Township	Incumbent

== Recent election results ==
PA House election, 2022: Pennsylvania House, District 105
Party	Candidate	Votes	%	±%
Democratic	Justin C. Fleming	16,399	63.55	
Republican	Therese Kenley	9,406	36.45	
Margin of victory		6,993	27.10	
Turnout		25,805	100	
Democratic gain from Republican				

PA House election, 2020: Pennsylvania House, District 105
Party	Candidate	Votes	%	±%
Republican	Andrew Lewis	21,320	51.83	
Democratic	Brittney L Rodas	19,814	48.17	
Margin of victory		1,506	3.66	
Turnout		41,134	100	
Republican hold				

PA House election, 2018: Pennsylvania House, District 105
Party	Candidate	Votes	%	±%
Republican	Andrew Lewis	15,789	50.82	
Democratic	Eric J. Epstein	15,277	49.18	
Margin of victory		512	1.64	
Turnout		31,066	100	
Republican hold				

PA House election, 2016: Pennsylvania House, District 105
Party	Candidate	Votes	%	±%
Republican	Ron Marsico	34,353	100	
Margin of victory		34,353	100	
Turnout		34,353	100	

PA House election, 2014: Pennsylvania House, District 105
Party	Candidate	Votes	%	±%
Republican	Ron Marsico	15,432	67.62	
Democratic	Kelly McEntee	7,391	32.38	
Margin of victory		8,041	35.24	▲5.14
Turnout		22,823	100	

PA House election, 2012: Pennsylvania House, District 105
Party	Candidate	Votes	%	±%
Republican	Ron Marsico	22,755	65.05	
Democratic	Kelly McEntee	12,225	34.95	
Margin of victory		10,530	30.10	▼69.90
Turnout		34,980	100	

PA House election, 2010: Pennsylvania House, District 105
Party	Candidate	Votes	%	±%
Republican	Ron Marsico	21,220	100	
Margin of victory		21,220	100	
Turnout		21,220	100	
