= Justin Fleming =

Justin Fleming may refer to:

- Justin Fleming (author) (born 1953), Australian playwright and author
- Justin C. Fleming, (born 1980), member of the Pennsylvania House of Representatives
