= Pennsylvania Route 894 =

Former state highway in Pennsylvania, United States

Pennsylvania Route 894

Route information
- Maintained by Pennsylvania Department of Highways
- Length: 7 mi (11 km)
- Existed: 1928–1946

Major junctions
- South end: US 22 in Paxtonia
- PA 39 in Linglestown
- North end: PA 443 near Piketown

Location
- Country: United States
- State: Pennsylvania
- Counties: Dauphin

Highway system
- Pennsylvania State Route System; Interstate; US; State; Scenic; Legislative
← PA 893	→ I-895

Pennsylvania Route 894 (PA 894) was a Pennsylvania state route. It was established in 1928, and deleted in 1946 after being extended from its original terminus outside of Linglestown through Piketown in the mid-1930s.

== Route description ==
The route description is based on where the route would be running if it existed today.

PA 894 started at US 22 in Paxtonia, heading north towards Blue Mountain and the square of Linglestown. PA 894 went right into the center of Linglestown, and then turned to the east, onto Pennsylvania Route 39. The route then exited out of Linglestown, where it originally ended, before being extended to Pennsylvania Route 443.

The PA 39/PA 894 concurrency ran from Linglestown to Piketown Road, about two miles (3.2 km) outside of Linglestown. PA 894 then turned north, going up Blue Mountain, through Piketown, ending at PA 443, at the northern foot of the mountain.

== History ==
At the time PA 894 was established, US 22 was PA 43. From 1928 to 1936, PA 894 ran from its southern terminus at PA 43 north and then east to the eastern end of Linglestown. In the mid-1930s, PA 39 was established, creating the concurrency between PA 39 and PA 894. When that happened, PA 894 was also extended, from its original northern terminus to PA 443. In 1946, PA 894 was deleted. The section of PA 894 from US 22 to PA 39 was given a legislative route number, and in 1987, a quadrant route. That section of road is known today as Mountain Road. The Piketown Road section was given a separate county route and quadrant route number.

== Major intersections ==
This table is based on the route as it existed before deletion in 1946. The entire route was in Dauphin County.

Location	mi	km	Destinations	Notes
Paxtonia	0.00	0.00	US 22	
Linglestown	1.49	2.40	PA 39	Begin PA 39/PA 894 concurrency
Linglestown	3.15	5.07	PA 39	End PA 39/PA 894 concurrency
Piketown	7.23	11.64	PA 443	
1.000 mi = 1.609 km; 1.000 km = 0.621 mi
