= Andrew Lewis (Pennsylvania politician) =

American politician and businessman

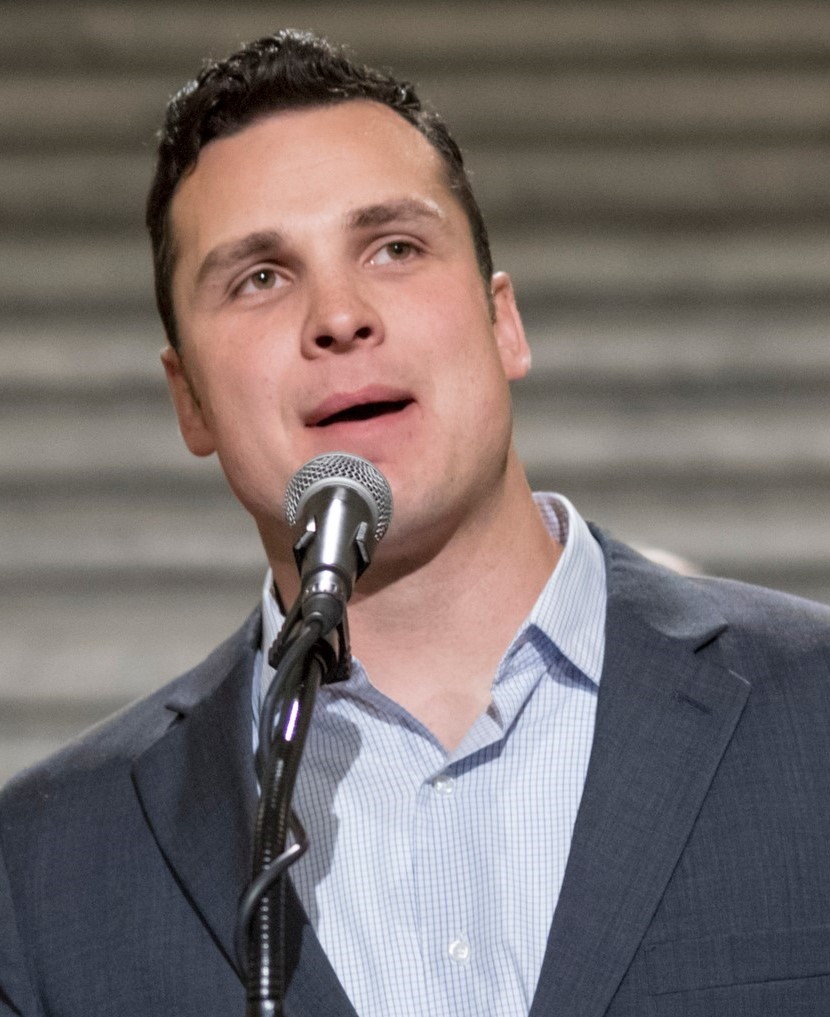
- Lewis in 2019

Member of the Pennsylvania House of Representatives from the 105th district
- In office January 1, 2019 – November 30, 2022
- Preceded by: Ron Marsico
- Succeeded by: Justin C. Fleming

Personal details
- Born: February 6, 1987 (age 39) Leonardtown, Maryland, U.S.
- Party: Republican
- Spouse: Ranae
- Children: 3
- Education: Thomas Edison State University (BA); George Washington University (MA); Temple University (MBA)

Military service
- Allegiance: United States
- Branch/service: United States Army
- Years of service: 2005–2015 (active); 2015–2020 (PAARNG)
- Rank: Staff sergeant
- Battles/wars: Iraq War
- Awards: Joint Service Commendation Medal, Army Commendation Medal, Presidential Service Badge, Combat Action Badge

Andrew James Lewis (born February 6, 1987) is an American businessman, politician and former member of the Pennsylvania House of Representatives. He represented the 105th District from 2019 to 2022.

== Early life and education ==
Lewis was born on February 6, 1987, in Leonardtown, Maryland. He graduated from Greenwood School District's Home Education Program in 2005. Lewis earned a Bachelor of Arts in political science from Thomas Edison State University in 2012, Master of Arts in legislative affairs from George Washington University in 2013, and a Master of Business Administration from Temple University in 2015. He also earned a graduate certificate in public policy from Liberty University.

== Military service ==
After graduating from high school in 2005, Lewis enlisted in the United States Army. He was deployed as a scout during the 2007-2008 Iraq troop surge for fifteen months in Iraq, where he experienced combat. Following his stint in Iraq, Lewis was selected as a counterintelligence agent and was stationed in South Korea for two years, during which time he was given oversight of his team. He was later assigned to the White House Communications Agency. Lewis was honorably discharged from active duty in 2015 at the rank of staff sergeant.

In 2024, Lewis was appointed to the rank of captain in the United States Army Reserve, serving on the Civil Affairs team. He was sworn in by former Pennsylvania Representative Frank Ryan, a retired military officer, at the U.S. Army Heritage and Education Center.

== Business career ==
After being honorably discharged from active duty in 2015, Lewis became chief operating officer of Tradesman Building Group, a company founded by his brother. He left the company in December 2018.

In 2019, he co-founded BiiLT Contracting Group. He later joined Berks Homes as a general manager in 2022 and since 2023 sits on the board of Lincoln Institute of Public Opinion Research Inc.

== Political career ==
In 2016, Lewis ran for the Republican nomination for the 15th Pennsylvania Senate District, but lost to John DiSanto.

Lewis was elected to represent the 105th District in the Pennsylvania House of Representatives in 2018, replacing the retiring Ronald Marsico. He was re-elected in 2020.

=== 2019-2020 committee assignments ===
- Urban Affairs Committee, Secretary
- Finance
- State Government
- Liquor Control

=== 2021-2022 committee assignments ===
- Education
- Health
- Judiciary
- State Government

In May 2020, Lewis tested positive for COVID-19. His staff was notified of their exposure, as were his Republican colleagues who had been in close contact. However, Lewis himself did not publicly reveal his diagnosis until after two weeks of quarantine. Democrats in the House criticized the Republican caucus for not disclosing Lewis's diagnosis earlier, alleging Republican leadership purposely kept it secret. The events surrounding Lewis's positive test and subsequent non-disclosure led to a new COVID protocol in the state house.

In 2020, Lewis was among 26 Pennsylvania House Republicans who called for the reversal of Joe Biden's certification as the winner of Pennsylvania's electoral votes in the 2020 United States presidential election, citing false claims of election irregularities. After the Electoral College was certified, he put out a statement acknowledging the results.

In August 2021, Lewis introduced a universal school choice bill, the Excellent Education for All Act, which would have created a state-funded school voucher program, make changes to the state's charter school law, increase funding for education tax credit scholarships, and make learning pods exempt from state regulation.

Following redistricting, Lewis was moved to the 104th District, a more Democratic district than the 105th. Because of this, Lewis chose not to seek re-election in 2022.

In February 2023, Lewis was recognized by Lower Paxton Township Supervisors and Dauphin County Commissioners for his service. He was presented with proclamations highlighting his achievements while in office, and February 7, 2023 was named "Representative Andrew Lewis Day" in Dauphin County.

== Personal life ==
Lewis lives in Lower Paxton Township, Pennsylvania, with his wife, Ranae, and their three sons.
