= List of highways numbered 895 =

The following highways are numbered 895:

== Canada ==
- Alberta Highway 895
- New Brunswick Route 895

== United States ==
- Interstate 895
- Maryland Route 895 (former)
- Nevada State Route 895
- New York State Route 895
- Pennsylvania Route 895
- Virginia State Route 895

Preceded by 894	Lists of highways 895	Succeeded by 896
