= Joseph Manmiller =

American politician

Joseph C. Manmiller

Member of the Pennsylvania House of Representatives from the 105th district
- In office 1975–1988
- Preceded by: Miles Zimmerman
- Succeeded by: Ron Marsico

Personal details
- Born: November 28, 1925
- Died: October 13, 2008 (aged 82) West Hanover Township, Pennsylvania, United States
- Party: Republican
- Occupation: Politician

Joseph C. Manmiller (November 28, 1925 – October 13, 2008) was a Republican member of the Pennsylvania House of Representatives from 1975 to 1988. He represented the 105th District.
