= Miles Zimmerman =

American politician

Miles B. Zimmerman, Jr.

Member of the Pennsylvania House of Representatives from the 105th district
- In office 1969–1974
- Preceded by: District created
- Succeeded by: Joseph C. Manmiller

Member of the Pennsylvania House of Representatives from the Dauphin County district
- In office 1967–1968

Personal details
- Born: December 19, 1917 Linglestown, Pennsylvania
- Died: December 17, 1989 (aged 71) Port St. Lucie, Florida
- Party: Republican

Miles B. Zimmerman, Jr. (December 19, 1917 – December 17, 1989) was a Republican member of the Pennsylvania House of Representatives.
