= Hoernerstown, Pennsylvania =

Unincorporated community in Pennsylvania, US

- Unincorporated community
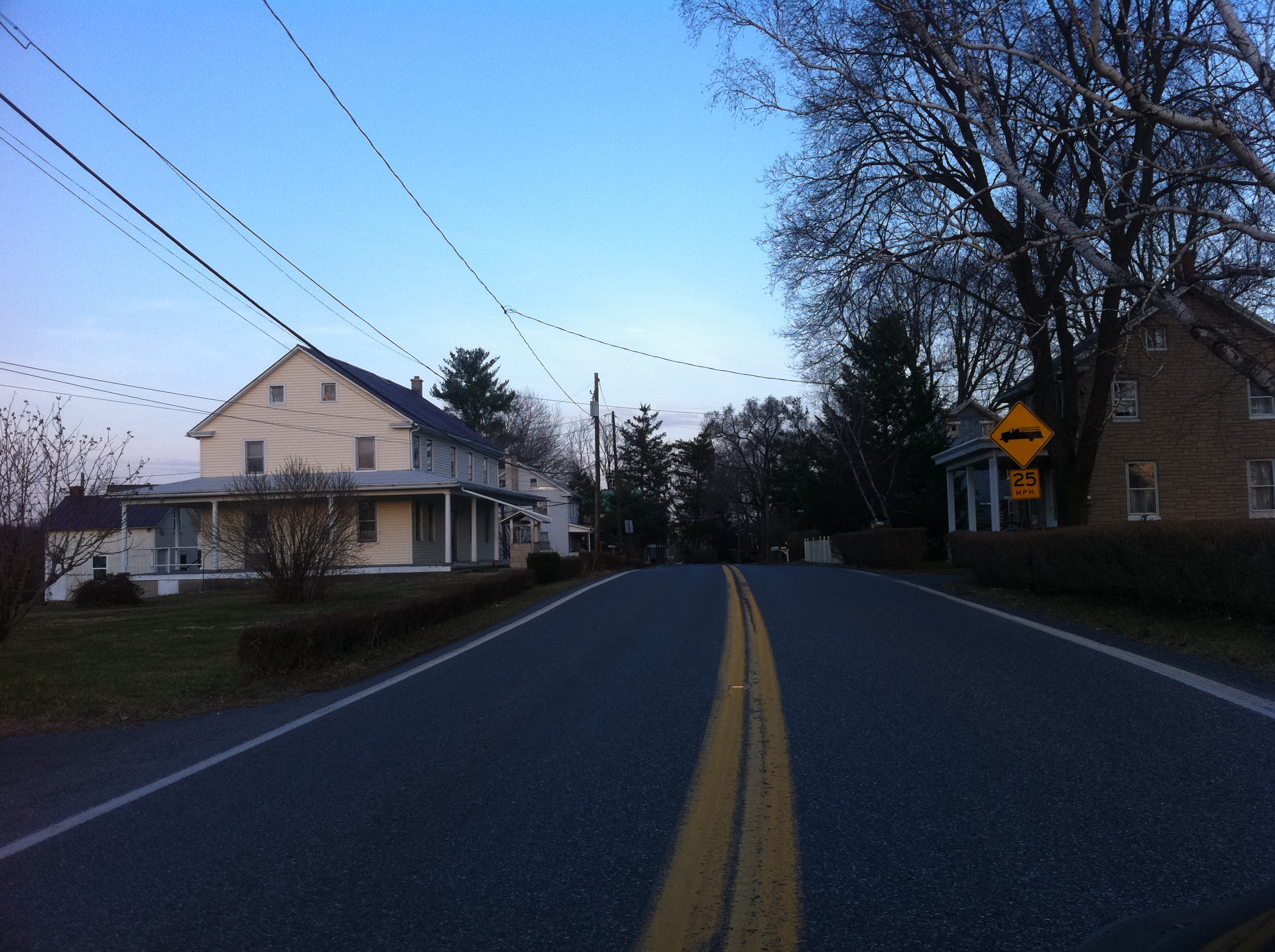
- Southern Approach to Hoernerstown PA

- Location within the state of Pennsylvania Hoernerstown (the United States)
- Coordinates: 40°17′13″N 76°43′26″W
- Country: United States
- State: Pennsylvania
- County: Dauphin
- Township: South Hanover
- Time zone: UTC-5 (Eastern (EST))
  - Summer (DST): UTC-4 (EDT)

Hoernerstown is an unincorporated community in South Hanover Township, Dauphin County, Pennsylvania, United States and is a part of the Harrisburg–Carlisle Metropolitan Statistical Area.

Hoernerstown was named for a family of settlers.

== See also ==
- Union Deposit, Pennsylvania
- Sand Beach, Pennsylvania
