= Pennsylvania Route 543 =

State highway in Pennsylvania, United States

State Route 3015
- Map of Dauphin County in central Pennsylvania with SR 3015 highlighted in red

Route information
- Maintained by PennDOT
- Length: 5.23 mi (8.42 km)
- Existed: 1987–present

Major junctions
- South end: Derry Street in Paxtang
- US 22 near Harrisburg; I-81 / US 322 near Harrisburg
- North end: PA 39 near Linglestown

Location
- Country: United States
- State: Pennsylvania
- Counties: Dauphin

Highway system
- Pennsylvania State Route System; Interstate; US; State; Scenic; Legislative
← PA 542	543	→ PA 545

SR 3015 is a five-mile (8 km) long road where the southern terminus is at Derry Street. Progress Avenue (pronounced /ˈproʊɡrɛs/) has two major intersections: I-81 (Exit 69), US 22. Major intersections for local roads are with Union Deposit Road in Susquehanna Township and Elmerton Avenue near Harrisburg. Its northern terminus is at Pennsylvania Route 39.

Until 1955, Progress Avenue was known as Pennsylvania Route 543 (PA 543).

== Route description ==
SR 3015 begins in the borough of Paxtang, at Derry Street. The borough is just outside the city of Harrisburg. The intersection of SR 3015 and Derry Street is the center of Paxtang. While SR 3015 ends at this intersection, the road continues straight, going through a park, and ending at Paxton Street, near the Harrisburg Mall, a distance of about a mile. In Paxtang, the road is known as Paxtang Avenue. Once outside the borough limits, it becomes Progress Avenue, which it remains all the way to the northern terminus of SR 3015.

The first intersection is with Union Deposit Road, near the Harrisburg city limits. Union Deposit Road is State Route 3020, and was at one time a section Pennsylvania Route 340. SR 3015 continues north to US 22. This is a heavily traveled intersection, with an Annual average daily traffic report of over an average of 22,500 vehicles a day, traveling on US 22 and an average of 15,500 vehicles traveling on SR 3015.

The road continues north, intersecting SR 3026, Elmerton Avenue near Harrisburg. Interstate 81 is less than a mile away, on the other side of a hill. When Interstate 81 was built, this exit was a small exit, but the area has since been built up with an office park, restaurants, a hotel, and a strip shopping center. The exit on I-81 is Exit 69, and the exit ramps are designated State Route 8005.

SR 3015 continues north through a series of hills - the foothills of nearby Blue Mountain. Between I-81 and Pennsylvania Route 39, there are no major intersections; the road is mostly straight, whereas the previous section of road had curves in it. At PA 39 is the northern terminus of SR 3015; Progress Avenue continues north into developments that have been built in the 2000s. Progress Avenue runs another one and a half miles before ending at Continental Drive.

== History ==

Until 1955, Progress Avenue was Pennsylvania Route 543. It was a spur of Pennsylvania Route 43, which ran on modern US 22 (Walnut Street, at its intersection with SR 3015), while US 22 was routed on Derry Street. In the mid 1930s, US 22 was moved from Derry Street to its current location on Walnut Street, and PA 43 was deleted. The route became orphaned from its parent once that happened, and when Pennsylvania cleaned up the road designations in 1955, PA 543 was deleted. However, the road remained under state funding, receiving a legislative route number. In 1987, when Pennsylvania instituted the Location Referencing System, the road was given its current designation SR 3015.

== Major intersections ==
The entire route is in Dauphin County.

Location	mi	km	Destinations	Notes
Paxtang	0.00	0.00	Derry Street	Former routing of US 22
Susquehanna Township	1.43	2.30	SR 3020 (Union Deposit Road)	Formerly PA 340
Susquehanna Township	1.92	3.09	US 22 (Walnut Street)	
Susquehanna Township	2.95	4.75	SR 3026 (Elmerton Avenue)	Signs posted as an alternate route to the Farm Show Complex in Harrisburg; Pennsylvania State Police headquarters
Susquehanna Township	3.32	5.34	I-81 / US 322 – Carlisle, Hazleton, Allentown	Exit 69 (I-81)
Susquehanna Township	5.23	8.42	PA 39 (Linglestown Road)	
1.000 mi = 1.609 km; 1.000 km = 0.621 mi

== See also ==
- List of Susquehanna Valley roads
