= List of highways numbered 894 =

The following highways are numbered 894:

== Canada ==
- Highway 894

== United States ==
- I-894
- MD 894
- SR 894
- PA 894
- PR-894

Preceded by 893	Lists of highways 894	Succeeded by 895
