= Union Deposit, Pennsylvania =

Unincorporated community in Pennsylvania, US

- Census-designated place
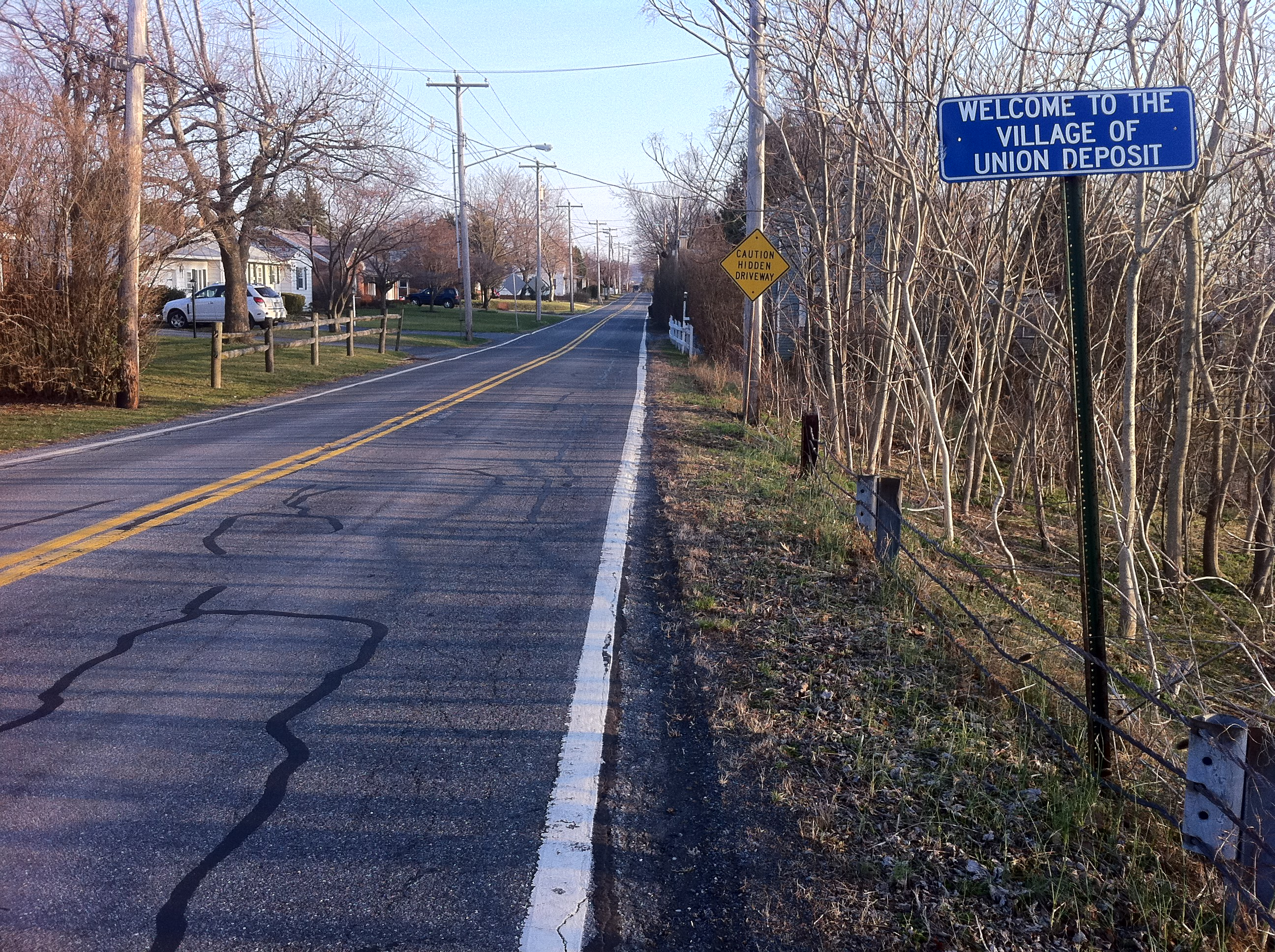
- Entering Union Deposit from North Hanover Street

- Location in Dauphin County and state of Pennsylvania
- Coordinates: 40°17′25″N 76°40′55″W
- Country: United States
- State: Pennsylvania
- County: Dauphin
- Township: South Hanover

Area
  - Total: 0.31 sq mi (0.81 km^{2})
  - Land: 0.30 sq mi (0.78 km^{2})
  - Water: 0.012 sq mi (0.03 km^{2})
- Elevation: 390 ft (120 m)

Population (2010)
  - Total: 407
  - Density: 1,359/sq mi (524.8/km^{2})
- Time zone: UTC-5 (Eastern (EST))
  - Summer (DST): UTC-4 (EDT)
- ZIP code: 17033
- FIPS code: 42-78472
- GNIS feature ID: 1214018

Union Deposit is an unincorporated community and census-designated place in South Hanover Township, Pennsylvania, United States. It is part of the Harrisburg–Carlisle Metropolitan Statistical Area. As of the 2010 census the population of Union Deposit was 407 residents.

Union Deposit (formerly called Unionville and Uniontown) was laid out in 1833 by Isaac Hershey (west end) and Philip Wolfersberger (east end). The village's original growth and namesake comes from construction of the Union Canal, which deposited goods in the area, upon where the village boomed from various commercial enterprises.

== Geography ==
The community is in southeastern Dauphin County, along the southeastern edge of South Hanover Township. Its southern and eastern border follows Swatara Creek, a southward-flowing tributary of the Susquehanna River. Pennsylvania Route 39 (Hershey Road) forms the northeastern edge of the community; it leads southeast 2 miles (3 km) to the center of Hershey and northwest 5 miles (8 km) to Interstate 81.

According to the U.S. Census Bureau, the Union Deposit CDP has a total area of 0.31 square miles (0.81 km^{2}), of which 0.30 square miles (0.78 km^{2}) is land and 0.01 square miles (0.03 km^{2}), or 4.19%, is water.

== See also ==
Other unincorporated communities in South Hanover Township:

- Hoernerstown, 2.5 miles (4.0 km) to the west
- Sand Beach, 1.5 miles (2.4 km) to the northeast
