= List of Susquehanna Valley roads =

This is a list of roads that have quadrant route numbers or state route numbers assigned by PennDOT, the Pennsylvania Department of Transportation.

- Capital Beltway (Harrisburg)
- Derry Street
- Interstate 76
- Interstate 78
- Interstate 81
- Interstate 83
- Interstate 283
- Paxton Street
- Pennsylvania Route 39
- Pennsylvania Route 230
- Pennsylvania Route 441
- Pennsylvania Route 501
- Pennsylvania Route 581
- State Route 3015 (Dauphin County, Pennsylvania)
- State Route 3017 (Dauphin County, Pennsylvania)
- State Route 3020 (Dauphin County, Pennsylvania)
- US 11
- US 15
- US 22
- US 30
- US 322
- US 422
