= John Todd House =

Historic house in Pennsylvania, United States

- U.S. National Register of Historic Places
- U.S. Historic district
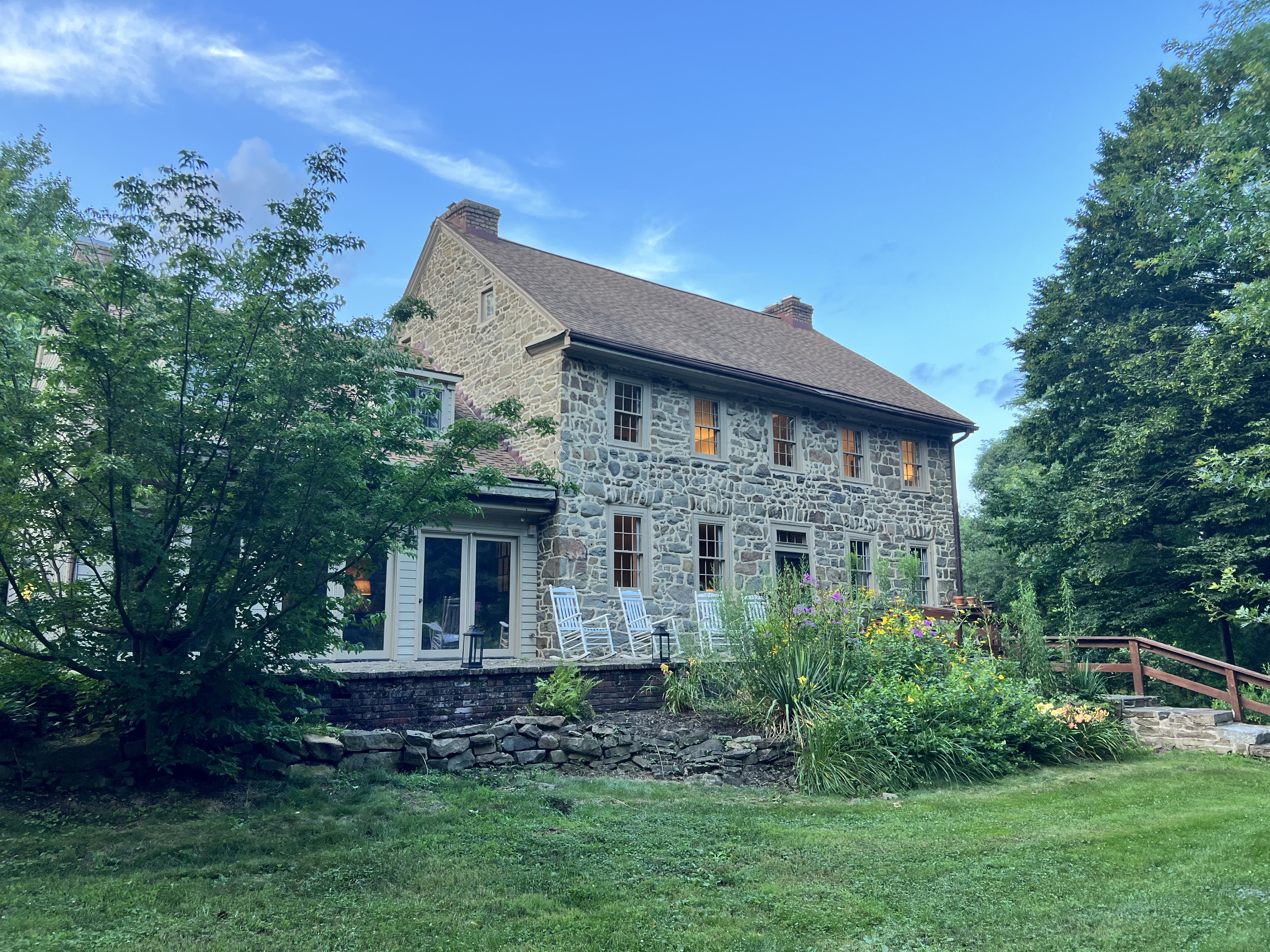
- John Todd House

- Location within Pennsylvania Location within the United States
- Location: South Meadow Lane, East Hanover Township, Pennsylvania
- Coordinates: 40°21′7″N 76°40′15″W
- Area: 6.5 acres (2.6 ha)
- Built: c. 1772
- Architectural style: Georgian
- NRHP reference No.: 88002371
- Added to NRHP: November 3, 1988

John Todd House is a historic home located at East Hanover Township, Dauphin County, Pennsylvania, United States. It was built about 1772, and is a 2 1/2-story, 5-bay fieldstone building in the Georgian style. A stone addition was built in 1954. Also on the property are a contributing summer house (1832) and hand-dug well.

It was added to the National Register of Historic Places in 1988.
