= List of highways numbered 893 =

The following highways are numbered 893:

== United States ==
- LA 893 (former)
- PA 893
- FM 893

Preceded by 892	Lists of highways 893	Succeeded by 894
