= List of highways numbered 889 =

The following highways are numbered 889:

== United States ==
- AR 889
- LA 889 (former)
- MD 889
- PR-889
- FM 889

Preceded by 888	Lists of highways 889	Succeeded by 890
