= Manada Creek =

Tributary of Swatara Creek

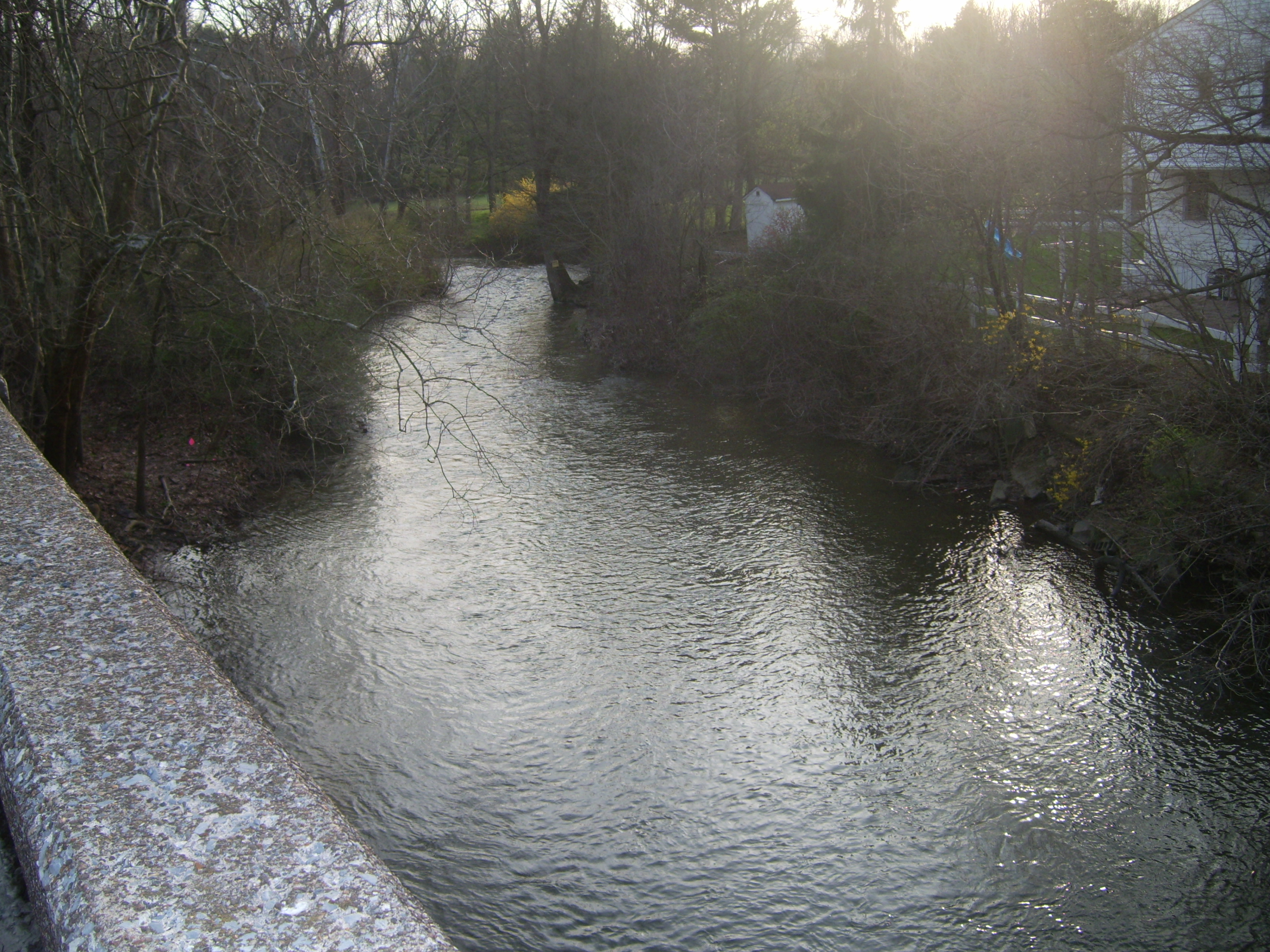
- View of the creek from the Jonestown Road Bridge at Manada Hill, Pennsylvania.

Location
- Country: United States
- State: Pennsylvania
- Counties: Dauphin, Lebanon
- Cities: Sandbeach, Manadahill, Manada Gap, Fort Indiantown Gap

Physical characteristics
- Source: Fort Indiantown Gap
  - location: East Hanover Township, Lebanon County, Pennsylvania, USA
  - coordinates: 40°26′29″N 76°38′41″W
- Mouth: Swatara Creek
  - location: Sand Beach, Dauphin County, Pennsylvania, USA
  - coordinates: 40°18′16″N 76°40′08″W
  - elevation: 348 ft (106 m)
- Length: 17.0 mi (27.4 km)
- Basin size: 32.2 mi^{2} (83 km^{2})
- Discharge
  - location: Manada Gap, Pennsylvania
  - average: 23 cu ft/s (0.65 m^{3}/s)
  - minimum: 8 cu ft/s (0.23 m^{3}/s)
  - maximum: 987 cu ft/s (27.9 m^{3}/s)

Basin features
- Tributaries
  - left: Walnut Run

Manada Creek is a 17.0-mile-long (27.4 km) tributary of Swatara Creek in Dauphin County, Pennsylvania in the United States. The watershed drains approximately 32 sq mi (83 km). The name is derived the Lenape word "menatey", meaning "island".

== Course ==
The creek is born in Blue Mountain at Fort Indiantown Gap, East Hanover Township by the confluence of several branches, flowing southwest. The gap through the mountains which it flows through is known as Manada Gap. Later, it becomes the border of East Hanover and West Hanover townships, continuing to wind through forests and agricultural farmland before spilling into the Swatara Creek along the outskirts of the unincorporated community of Sand Beach.

The tributary Walnut Run joins Manada Creek in East Hanover Township.

== Variant names ==
The stream was known originally as Monody Creek. Several variant names are not included into the Geographic Names Information System. These variants include:

- Manady
- Manity
- Mannadys
- Monady
- Monaday
- Monnaday
- Monaidy
- Monday

== See also ==
- List of rivers of Pennsylvania
- Fort Manada
- Manada Furnace
- Manada Gap, Pennsylvania
- Manada Hill, Pennsylvania
