= Ron Marsico =

American politician

Member of the Pennsylvania House of Representatives from the 105th district
- In office January 3, 1989 – January 1, 2019
- Preceded by: Joseph C. Manmiller
- Succeeded by: Andrew Lewis

Personal details
- Born: October 30, 1947 (age 78) Harrisburg, Pennsylvania
- Party: Republican
- Spouse: Elaine
- Children: 2
- Education: Ohio State University (BA)
- Website: www.ronmarscio.com

Ronald S. Marsico (born October 30, 1947) is a former Republican member of the Pennsylvania House of Representatives for the 105th District and was elected in 1988. He was the Republican Chairman of the House Judiciary Committee and a member of the House Transportation Committee.

== Personal ==
Marsico graduated from Bishop McDevitt High School and Ohio State University. He and his wife have two children and seven grandchildren. He previously served in the United States Army Reserve from 1967 to 1973.
