= Shellsville, Pennsylvania =

Unincorporated community in Pennsylvania, US

- Unincorporated community
- Location within the U.S. state of Pennsylvania Shellsville (the United States)
- Coordinates: 40°22′00″N 76°40′14″W
- Country: United States
- State: Pennsylvania
- County: Dauphin
- Township: East Hanover
- Time zone: UTC-5 (Eastern (EST))
  - Summer (DST): UTC-4 (EDT)

Shellsville is an unincorporated community in East Hanover Township, Dauphin County, Pennsylvania, United States. It is part of the Harrisburg–Carlisle Metropolitan Statistical Area.

== See also ==
- Hollywood Casino at Penn National Race Course
