= Manada Hill, Pennsylvania =

Unincorporated community in Pennsylvania, U.S.

Coordinates: 40.3443°N 76.7055°W

Manada Hill (Manadahill on GNIS records) is an unincorporated community in East Hanover Township, Dauphin County, Pennsylvania, United States, adjoining the census-designated place of Skyline View.

The village is bounded to the east by Interstate 81 and along Route 39 at the intersection with Jonestown Road to the north, Manada View Drive to the south and Manada Creek to the east.

== History ==
Manada Hill is a historic village named for its hilltop location near a bend in the Manada Creek.

It was the only true village of the township, containing a post office and a few stores and shops to supply the surrounding neighborhood. Traveling peddlers provided incidental needs before the establishment of the country store. Three churches surrounded the community within a radius of three miles (5 km): a small Lutheran congregation; to the southeast the German Baptists built a church taken over in 1860 by the Hanoverdale Church of the Brethren; and to the northeast, the Zion Lutheran Church.

Beginning in the 1970s and accelerating in the early 2000s, Manada Hill's 18th and 19th century shops, homes, and ancillary buildings were demolished for interstate commercial development along Interstate 81). As of 2015, the only remaining buildings that reflect the history of the village are the turn-of-the-century United Brethren Church and a single two-story building currently functioning as a pizza shop.

== See also ==
- Hollywood Casino at Penn National Race Course
