= Colonial Park, Pennsylvania =

Unincorporated community in Pennsylvania, US

- Census-designated place
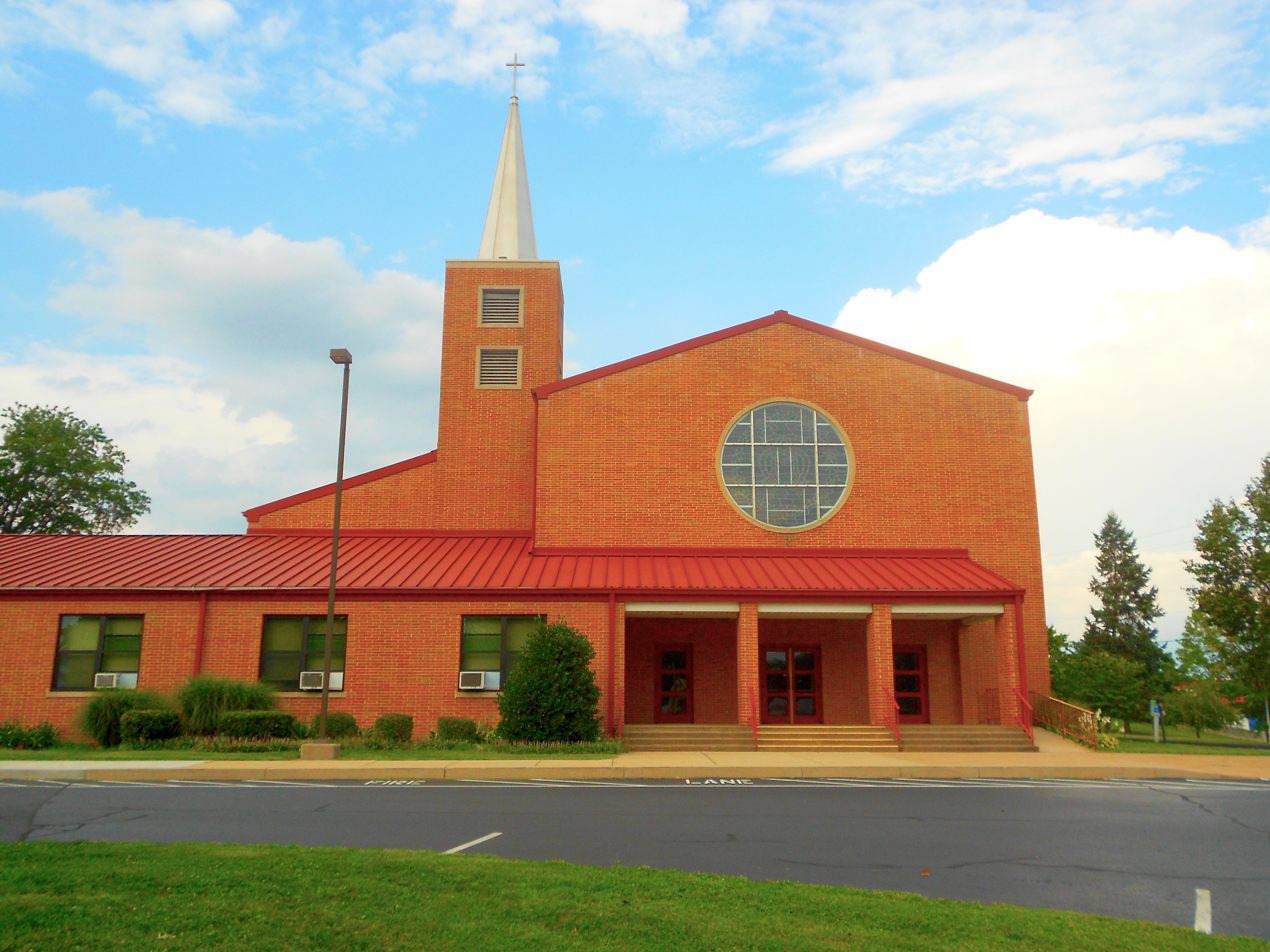
- Colonial Park United Church of Christ, August 2016

- Location in Dauphin County and state of Pennsylvania.
- Coordinates: 40°17′56″N 76°48′33″W
- Country: United States
- State: Pennsylvania
- County: Dauphin
- Township: Lower Paxton

Area
  - Total: 5.04 sq mi (13.06 km^{2})
  - Land: 5.04 sq mi (13.06 km^{2})
  - Water: 0 sq mi (0.00 km^{2})
- Elevation: 500 ft (150 m)

Population (2020)
  - Total: 16,243
  - Density: 3,221.5/sq mi (1,243.84/km^{2})
- Time zone: UTC-5 (Eastern (EST))
  - Summer (DST): UTC-4 (EDT)
- ZIP code: 17109
- Area code: 717
- FIPS code: 42-15328
- GNIS feature ID: 1172233

Colonial Park is an unincorporated community and census-designated place (CDP) in Lower Paxton Township, Pennsylvania, United States. The population was 13,229 at the 2010 census. It is part of the Harrisburg metropolitan area. It uses the Harrisburg ZIP code of 17109 and hosts a great deal of the area's retail activity, including the Colonial Park Mall.

== Geography ==
Colonial Park is located in the southwestern quadrant of Lower Paxton Township at 40°17′56″N 76°48′33″W (40.298789, -76.809067). It is bordered to the northeast by Paxtonia and to the west by Progress. Interstate 83 forms the western boundary of the CDP. U.S. Route 22 (Jonestown Road) is the main highway through Colonial Park, leading west 5 miles (8 km) to downtown Harrisburg and east 23 miles (37 km) to Fredericksburg.

According to the United States Census Bureau, the CDP has a total area of 4.7 square miles (12.3 km^{2}), all land.

== Demographics ==
Historical population
Census	Pop.	Note	%±
2020	16,243		—
U.S. Decennial Census

=== 2020 census ===
As of the 2020 census, Colonial Park had a population of 16,243. The median age was 37.4 years. 21.2% of residents were under the age of 18 and 16.6% of residents were 65 years of age or older. For every 100 females there were 93.9 males, and for every 100 females age 18 and over there were 89.7 males age 18 and over.

100.0% of residents lived in urban areas, while 0.0% lived in rural areas.

There were 6,928 households in Colonial Park, of which 27.9% had children under the age of 18 living in them. Of all households, 38.1% were married-couple households, 20.2% were households with a male householder and no spouse or partner present, and 32.8% were households with a female householder and no spouse or partner present. About 33.5% of all households were made up of individuals and 11.3% had someone living alone who was 65 years of age or older.

There were 7,418 housing units, of which 6.6% were vacant. The homeowner vacancy rate was 1.2% and the rental vacancy rate was 7.3%.

Racial composition as of the 2020 census
Race	Number	Percent
White	8,594	52.9%
Black or African American	3,577	22.0%
American Indian and Alaska Native	56	0.3%
Asian	1,729	10.6%
Native Hawaiian and Other Pacific Islander	5	0.0%
Some other race	963	5.9%
Two or more races	1,319	8.1%
Hispanic or Latino (of any race)	1,904	11.7%

=== 2010 census ===
As of the 2010 United States census, there were 13,229 people living in the CDP. The racial makeup of the CDP was 69.7% White, 14.9% Black, 0.1% Native American, 4.5% Asian, 0.1% Pacific Islander, 0.1% from some other race and 2.8% from two or more races. 7.8% were Hispanic or Latino of any race.

=== 2000 census ===
As of the 2000 census, there were 13,259 people, 6,134 households, and 3,477 families living in the CDP. The population density was 2,825.6 inhabitants per square mile (1,091.0/km^{2}). There were 6,484 housing units at an average density of 1,381.8 per square mile (533.5/km^{2}). The racial makeup of the CDP was 83.19% White, 9.75% African American, 0.08% Native American, 3.84% Asian, 0.02% Pacific Islander, 1.52% from other races, and 1.61% from two or more races. Hispanic or Latino of any race were 3.12% of the population.

There were 6,134 households, out of which 22.1% had children under the age of 18 living with them, 43.0% were married couples living together, 10.1% had a female householder with no husband present, and 43.3% were non-families. 36.1% of all households were made up of individuals, and 11.5% had someone living alone who was 65 years of age or older. The average household size was 2.12 and the average family size was 2.78.

In the CDP, the population was spread out, with 18.8% under the age of 18, 9.3% from 18 to 24, 31.4% from 25 to 44, 21.9% from 45 to 64, and 18.5% who were 65 years of age or older. The median age was 39 years. For every 100 females, there were 91.8 males. For every 100 females age 18 and over, there were 87.9 males.

The median income for a household in the CDP was $40,562, and the median income for a family was $49,676. Males had a median income of $35,749 versus $28,631 for females. The per capita income for the CDP was $22,436. About 4.7% of families and 6.2% of the population were below the poverty line, including 7.9% of those under age 18 and 4.8% of those age 65 or over.

== See also ==
- Lower Paxton Township, Pennsylvania
