= List of highways numbered 890 =

The following highways are numbered 890:

== Canada ==
- New Brunswick Route 890

== Cuba ==
- Road to Playa El Rosario (2–890)

== United States ==
- I-890
- NY 890
- PA 890
- PR-890

Preceded by 889	Lists of highways 890	Succeeded by 891
