= Manada Gap, Pennsylvania =

Unincorporated community in Pennsylvania, US

- Unincorporated community
- Location within the state of Pennsylvania Manada Gap (the United States)
- Coordinates: 40°23′49″N 76°42′36″W
- Country: United States
- State: Pennsylvania
- County: Dauphin
- Township: East Hanover
- Time zone: UTC-5 (Eastern (EST))
  - Summer (DST): UTC-4 (EDT)

Pennsylvania Historical Marker
- Official name: Fort Manada
- Designated: May 12, 1982

Manada Gap is an unincorporated community in East Hanover Township, Dauphin County, Pennsylvania, United States, located in the Harrisburg-Carlisle area, near Fort Indiantown Gap.

== Fort Manada ==
Fort Manada (also known as James Brown's Fort) was a settler-built stockaded blockhouse established by James Brown in response to Indian attacks in the area, and then improved and commanded by Captain Frederick Smith (Schmitt) as a sub-post of Fort Swatara. Its exact location is unknown, but records indicate that it stood on what was the property of William Rhoads, about 300 yards west of Manada Creek, about midway between it and the road to Jonestown and three-quarters of a mile south of Manada Gap.

Captain Smith and his company were mustered into provincial service early in January 1756 and were ordered to establish a defense or occupy and improve the existing defense at Swatara and Manada. As in the case of Fort Hunter, the settlers at Manada Gap had already constructed a stockaded blockhouse in late 1755. The garrison, probably around 20 men, was spread between the fort and settlers' homes, protecting the dwellings and the workers in the field.

In February 1756, Captain Frederick Smith, with his company of troops, either completed the fort or built a new one, which they called Fort Manada. James Brown was killed by Indians on 6 August 1756. The fort was in use from late 1755 until May 1757, which is the last time it is mentioned in official documents.

A historical marker was erected in 1970 by the Pennsylvania Historical and Museum Commission in East Hanover Township, on Mountain Road.
