= List of highways numbered 891 =

The following highways are numbered 891:

== United States ==
Territories

- Puerto Rico Highway 891

West Virginia

- West Virginia Route 891

Preceded by 890	Lists of highways 891	Succeeded by 892
