= List of highways numbered 892 =

The following highways are numbered 892:

== United States ==
- LA 892
- FM 892
- WV 892

Preceded by 891	Lists of highways 892	Succeeded by 893
