= Interstate 895 (disambiguation) =

Interstate 895 is a bypass through Baltimore, Maryland.

Interstate 895 may also refer to:

- Interstate 895 (Rhode Island–Massachusetts), a never-built bypass of Providence, Rhode Island
- New York State Route 895, a short connector in Bronx, New York formerly numbered Interstate 895
- Interstate 895 (New Jersey–Pennsylvania), a never-built connector northeast of Philadelphia, Pennsylvania
- Interstate 95 in Delaware, temporarily signed as Interstate 895 through Wilmington
- Part of eastern Interstate 76 (now Interstate 676), a freeway through Philadelphia, Pennsylvania
- Virginia State Route 895, a connector in Richmond, Virginia that was originally slated to become Interstate 895.
