= Lower Paxton Township, Pennsylvania =

Township in Pennsylvania, US

Coordinates: 40°20′00″N 76°47′59″W

- Township
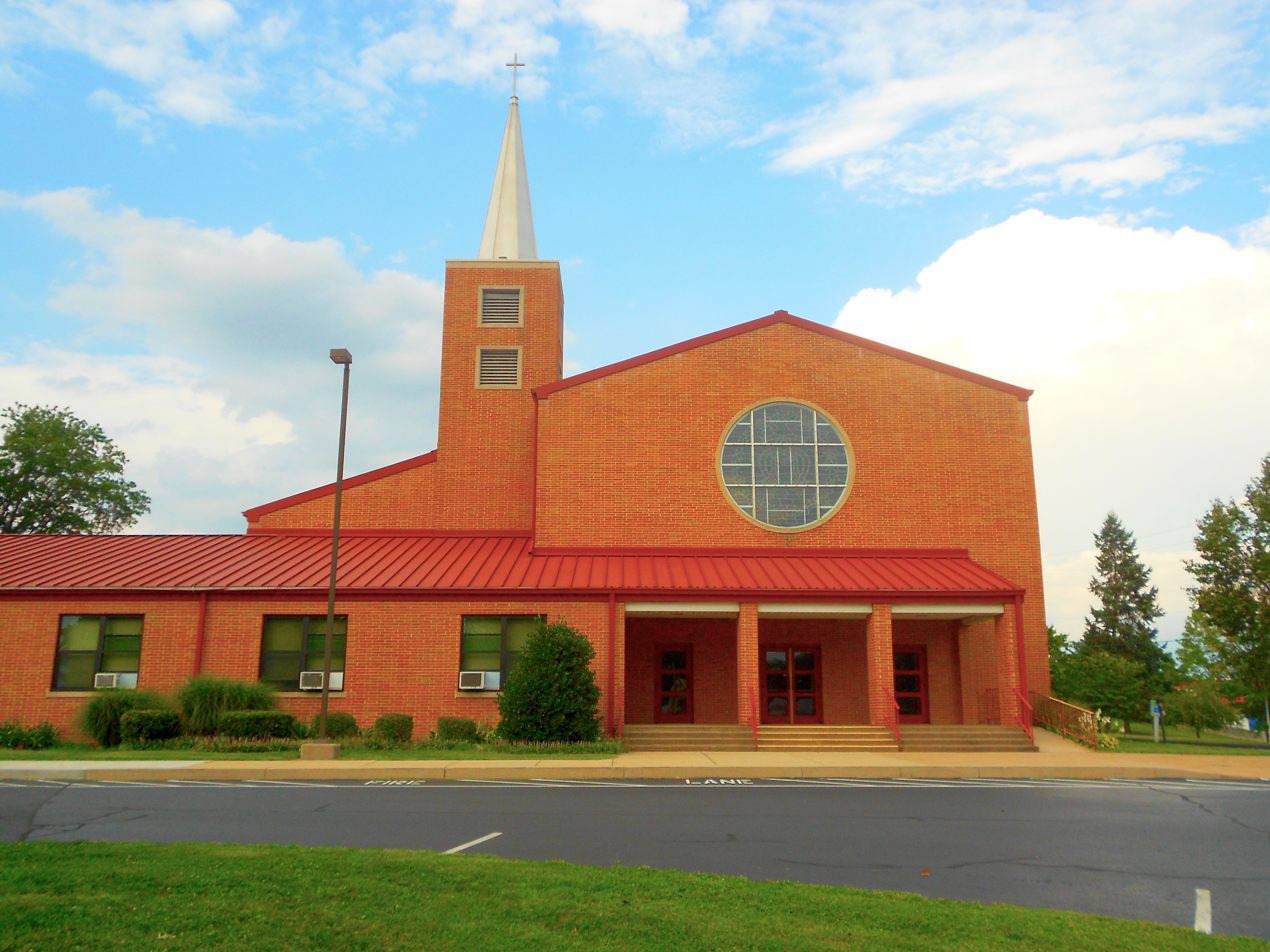
- Colonial Park United Church of Christ - August 2016

- Flag Seal

- Location in Dauphin County and state of Pennsylvania.
- Country: United States
- State: Pennsylvania
- County: Dauphin
- Settled: 1717
- Incorporated: 1729

Area
  - Total: 28.17 sq mi (72.96 km^{2})
  - Land: 28.17 sq mi (72.96 km^{2})
  - Water: 0 sq mi (0.00 km^{2})

Population (2020)
  - Total: 53,514 ▲
  - Estimate (2023): 54,807
  - Density: 1,900/sq mi (733.5/km^{2})
- Time zone: UTC-5 (Eastern (EST))
  - Summer (DST): UTC-4 (EDT)
- Area codes: 717 and 223
- FIPS code: 42-043-45056
- Website: lowerpaxton-pa.gov

Lower Paxton is a township in Dauphin County, Pennsylvania, United States. The population was 53,514 at the 2020 census. It is the most populous municipality in Dauphin County and the 17th-most populated municipality in the state.

Lower Paxton Township is located 76.6 miles (123.3 km) southwest of Allentown, 9.4 miles (15.1 km) northeast of Harrisburg, and 107.3 miles (172.7 km) northwest of Philadelphia.

The township was incorporated in 1767 from Paxton Township.

== History ==
In 1729, the Paxtang Township was established within Lancaster County. The spelling "Paxtang" is from the original American Indian name Peshtank, which meant "standing water". Today the word "Paxton" is used instead of Paxtang.

On March 4, 1785, the boundaries of Paxtang Township also became the borders of Dauphin County, split from Lancaster County. "Dauphin" refers to the Dauphin of France, heir apparent to the French throne, whose country the area government wanted to honor for its assistance in the Revolutionary War. About two years later in August 1787 the legislature began to splinter Paxtang Township, first into Upper Paxtang, Middle Paxtang, and Lower Paxtang.

In the years after Dauphin County was established, the township was slowly divided. Hanover Township was cut off to the east in 1736, and Upper Paxton Township was cut off to the north in 1767. What remained in 1767 was then renamed Lower Paxton Township. The divisions continued. Harrisburg Borough, now the city of Harrisburg, was formed in 1791, and Swatara Township was created in 1799. In 1878, more land was cut off the north and became Middle Paxton Township.

Lower Paxtang Township embraced the areas now occupied by Lower Swatara, Swatara, Lower Paxton, Derry, and Susquehanna townships. Lower Paxton has remained the same area since Susquehanna Township was formed from it on May 1, 1815.

== Geography ==
Lower Paxton Township is located in south-central Dauphin County, bordered by Susquehanna Township to the west, Middle Paxton Township to the north, West Hanover and South Hanover townships to the east, and Swatara Township to the south. The eastern border of Lower Paxton Township is formed by Beaver Creek, a south-flowing tributary of Swatara Creek, which flows to the Susquehanna River. The northern border of the township follows or is close to the crest of Blue Mountain, the southernmost ridge of the Ridge-and-Valley Appalachians in this region. According to the United States Census Bureau, the township has a total area of 28.1 square miles (72.8 km^{2}), all of it land.

There are four unincorporated communities, all of which are census-designated places, in Lower Paxton Township. Linglestown (population 6,334) is in the northeast part of the township, Paxtonia (population 5,412) is in the center, Colonial Park (population 13,229) is in the west and southwest, and a small portion of Progress is in the far west, though it is mainly in Susquehanna Township.

Interstate 83 runs through the western part of the township, terminating at Interstate 81, which crosses the center of the township from west to east. I-83 access in the township is from Exit 50 (U.S. Route 22/Jonestown Road) and Exit 48 (Union Deposit Road), while I-81 access is from Exit 72, between Linglestown and Paxtonia.

== Demographics ==
Historical population
Census	Pop.	Note	%±
1930	2,792		—
1940	4,157		48.9%
1950	6,546		57.5%
1960	17,618		169.1%
1970	26,517		50.5%
1980	34,830		31.3%
1990	39,162		12.4%
2000	44,424		13.4%
2010	47,360		6.6%
2020	53,514		13.0%
2023 (est.)	54,807		2.4%

As of the census of 2000, there were 44,424 people, 18,584 households, and 12,153 families residing in the township. The population density was 1,580.9 inhabitants per square mile (610.4/km^{2}). There were 19,606 housing units at an average density of 697.7 per square mile (269.4/km^{2}). The racial makeup of the township was 86.51% White, 8.28% African American, 0.10% Native American, 2.69% Asian, 0.02% Pacific Islander, 1.04% from other races, and 1.35% from two or more races. Hispanic or Latino of any race were 2.37% of the population.

There were 18,584 households, out of which 29.0% had children under the age of 18 living with them, 53.2% were married couples living together, 9.2% had a female householder with no husband present, and 34.6% were non-families. 28.8% of all households were made up of individuals, and 8.4% had someone living alone who was 65 years of age or older. The average household size was 2.35 and the average family size was 2.92.

In the township the population was spread out, with 22.5% under the age of 18, 7.3% from 18 to 24, 30.9% from 25 to 44, 25.2% from 45 to 64, and 14.1% who were 65 years of age or older. The median age was 39 years. For every 100 females, there were 91.4 males. For every 100 females age 18 and over, there were 87.8 males.

The median income for a household in the township was $49,566, and the median income for a family was $61,017. Males had a median income of $41,147 versus $30,837 for females. The per capita income for the township was $26,116. About 3.2% of families and 4.1% of the population were below the poverty line, including 5.0% of those under age 18 and 2.5% of those age 65 or over.

== Education ==
Children in the township attend the Central Dauphin School District.
