= Interstate 895 (New Jersey–Pennsylvania) =

Highway in New Jersey and Pennsylvania, United States

Interstate 895
- I-895 corridor highlighted in red

Route information
- Auxiliary route of I-95
- Length: 6.4 mi (10.3 km)
- Existed: 1963–1981
- NHS: Entire route

Major junctions
- South end: I-295 in Burlington, NJ
- US 130 in Burlington, NJ; US 13 in Bristol, PA
- North end: I-95 in Bristol, PA

Location
- Country: United States
- States: New Jersey, Pennsylvania
- Counties: NJ: Burlington; PA: Bucks

Highway system
- Interstate Highway System; Main; Auxiliary; Suffixed; Business; Future
← Route 700	NJ	→ US 1
← PA 894	PA	→ PA 895

Interstate 895 (I-895) was a planned 6.4-mile-long (10.3 km) auxiliary Interstate Highway in New Jersey and Pennsylvania that would have provided a freeway between I-295 near Burlington in Burlington County, New Jersey, and I-95 near Bristol in Bucks County, Pennsylvania.

== History ==
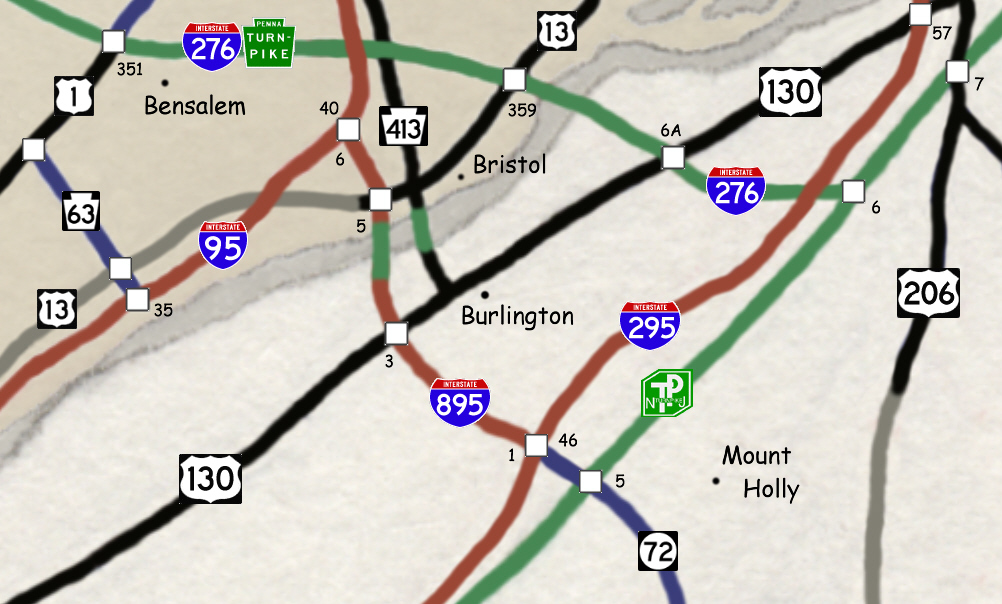
Map of proposed route of I-895 between I-95 and I-295, with the additional proposed extension of the Route 72 freeway

In 1963, the Delaware River Port Authority proposed several new bridges across the Delaware River in the Philadelphia area, including a high-level crossing between Bristol, Pennsylvania, and Burlington, New Jersey, near the existing Burlington–Bristol Bridge. Following this proposal, a freeway was planned to link this bridge to I-295 near Burlington and I-95 near Bristol. This proposed freeway would be designated I-895 in the late 1960s. I-895 would have completed the partial beltway around Trenton formed by I-95 and I-295 as well as provided a beltway around Philadelphia along with the Pennsylvania Turnpike, I-476, and I-295. The proposed six lane freeway was meant to have two mainline interchanges with US Route 13 (US 13) in Pennsylvania and US 130 in New Jersey, and the terminus interchanges with I-95 and I-295, giving the freeway four total interchanges from start to finish. Once the freeway met I-295, there were plans to extend it as the Route 72 freeway toward Long Beach Island where it would meet the existing Route 72 at Route 70.

In the early 1970s, I-895 gained opposition from area residents, who feared the road would cause disruption to residential areas in both Burlington and Bristol. The alignment for I-895 was approved by the Federal Highway Administration in 1973. The approach roads to the bridge were approved by New Jersey Governor Brendan Byrne in December 1975, but Pennsylvania Governor Milton Shapp opposed it because there was not a connection to I-95. As a result, the Burlington County Bridge Commission decided to build the Pennsylvania portion of the freeway. However, rising costs and desire of funds for mass transit led to the cancelation of I-895 in 1981, with the money allocated to the road transferred to other road and mass transit projects.

== Exit list ==
State	County	Location	mi	km	Exit	Destinations	Notes
New Jersey	Burlington	Burlington	0.0	0.0	1	I-295 / Route 72 south	Proposed southern terminus, would have been exit 46 on I-295; continuation south beyond I-295 would have been extension of Route 72 as a freeway
New Jersey	Burlington	Burlington			3	US 130	
Delaware River			4	6.4			
Pennsylvania	Bucks	Bristol			5	US 13	
Pennsylvania	Bucks	Bristol	6.4	10.3	6	I-95	Proposed northern terminus; would have supplemented existing exit 40 on I-95 (PA 413)
1.000 mi = 1.609 km; 1.000 km = 0.621 mi: Route transition
