= Justin C. Fleming =

American politician

Justin Fleming

Member of the Pennsylvania House of Representatives from the 105th district
- Incumbent
- Assumed office January 3, 2023
- Preceded by: Andrew Lewis

Personal details
- Born: July 5, 1980 (age 46)
- Party: Democratic
- Education: Susquehanna Township High School; Millersville University of Pennsylvania
- Website: Official website

Justin C. Fleming is a Democratic member of the Pennsylvania House of Representatives, representing the 105th District since 2023.

== Biography ==
Fleming graduated from Susquehanna Township High School (1998) and Millersville University of Pennsylvania (2002). He served as a press officer for the Pennsylvania Emergency Management Agency, Pennsylvania Department of Labor and Industry, and Pennsylvania Department of Agriculture before working in government relations for the National Association of Social Workers, Pennsylvania Psychological Association, and Pennsylvania Partnerships for Children. In 2013, he was elected to the Susquehanna Township Board of Commissioners, representing the 8th Ward.

In 2022, Fleming was elected to the Pennsylvania House of Representatives for the 105th District, defeating Republican Therese Kenley.

Political offices
Pennsylvania House of Representatives
Preceded by Andrew Lewis	Member of the Pennsylvania House of Representatives from the 105th district 2023–present	Incumbent
