= Piketown, Pennsylvania =

Unincorporated community in Pennsylvania, US

Piketown, Pennsyvainia
- Location within the state of Pennsylvania Piketown (the United States)
- Coordinates: 40°22′44″N 76°45′22″W
- Country: United States
- State: Pennsylvania
- County: Dauphin
- Township: West Hanover

Population (2010)
  - Total: 824
- Time zone: UTC-5 (Eastern (EST))
  - Summer (DST): UTC-4 (EDT)

Piketown is an area in West Hanover Township, Dauphin County, Pennsylvania, United States, located near Fort Indiantown Gap.
