= Skyline View, Pennsylvania =

Unincorporated community in Pennsylvania, US

- Census-designated place
- Location in Dauphin County and state of Pennsylvania.
- Coordinates: 40°20′11″N 76°43′22″W
- Country: United States
- State: Pennsylvania
- County: Dauphin
- Township: West Hanover

Area
  - Total: 2.67 sq mi (6.92 km^{2})
  - Land: 2.67 sq mi (6.92 km^{2})
  - Water: 0 sq mi (0.00 km^{2})
- Elevation: 503 ft (153 m)

Population (2020)
  - Total: 4,410
  - Density: 1,650.0/sq mi (637.07/km^{2})
- Time zone: UTC-5 (Eastern (EST))
  - Summer (DST): UTC-4 (EDT)
- ZIP code: 17112
- Area code: 717
- FIPS code: 42-71032
- GNIS feature ID: 1187769

Skyline View is an unincorporated community and census-designated place (CDP) in West Hanover Township, Pennsylvania, United States. The population was 4,003 at the 2010 census, up from 2,307 at the 2000 census. It is part of the Harrisburg–Carlisle Metropolitan Statistical Area.

== Geography ==
Skyline View is located in southern West Hanover Township at 40°20′11″N 76°43′22″W (40.336439, -76.722848). Its northern border follows Interstate 81, and its eastern border follows Pennsylvania Route 39. U.S. Route 22 (Allentown Boulevard) runs through the center of the community, leading east 70 miles (110 km) to Allentown and west 10 miles (16 km) to downtown Harrisburg. PA 39 leads south 6 miles (10 km) to Hershey.

According to the United States Census Bureau, the Skyline View CDP has a total area of 2.7 square miles (6.9 km^{2}), all land.

== Demographics ==
=== 2020 census ===
As of the 2020 census, Skyline View had a population of 4,410. The median age was 48.2 years. 17.3% of residents were under the age of 18 and 26.3% of residents were 65 years of age or older. For every 100 females there were 94.5 males, and for every 100 females age 18 and over there were 91.7 males age 18 and over.

100.0% of residents lived in urban areas, while 0.0% lived in rural areas.

There were 1,895 households in Skyline View, of which 22.9% had children under the age of 18 living in them. Of all households, 57.6% were married-couple households, 14.4% were households with a male householder and no spouse or partner present, and 22.5% were households with a female householder and no spouse or partner present. About 26.5% of all households were made up of individuals and 12.4% had someone living alone who was 65 years of age or older.

There were 1,997 housing units, of which 5.1% were vacant. The homeowner vacancy rate was 0.7% and the rental vacancy rate was 9.3%.

Racial composition as of the 2020 census
Race	Number	Percent
White	3,866	87.7%
Black or African American	153	3.5%
American Indian and Alaska Native	5	0.1%
Asian	128	2.9%
Native Hawaiian and Other Pacific Islander	0	0.0%
Some other race	69	1.6%
Two or more races	189	4.3%
Hispanic or Latino (of any race)	143	3.2%

=== 2000 census ===
As of the census of 2000, there were 2,307 people, 865 households, and 703 families residing in the CDP. The population density was 867.7 inhabitants per square mile (335.0/km^{2}). There were 890 housing units at an average density of 334.8 per square mile (129.3/km^{2}). The racial makeup of the CDP was 97.01% White, 1.08% African American, 1.30% Asian, 0.04% Pacific Islander, 0.09% from other races, and 0.48% from two or more races. Hispanic or Latino of any race were 0.61% of the population.

There were 865 households, out of which 28.9% had children under the age of 18 living with them, 72.0% were married couples living together, 6.7% had a female householder with no husband present, and 18.7% were non-families. 15.8% of all households were made up of individuals, and 6.9% had someone living alone who was 65 years of age or older. The average household size was 2.67 and the average family size was 2.95.

In the CDP, the population was spread out, with 22.6% under the age of 18, 5.5% from 18 to 24, 27.2% from 25 to 44, 30.8% from 45 to 64, and 13.9% who were 65 years of age or older. The median age was 42 years. For every 100 females, there were 100.1 males. For every 100 females age 18 and over, there were 94.7 males.

The median income for a household in the CDP was $54,853, and the median income for a family was $61,439. Males had a median income of $40,216 versus $35,708 for females. The per capita income for the CDP was $23,418. About 1.2% of families and 2.4% of the population were below the poverty line, including none of those under age 18 and 6.5% of those age 65 or over.

Historical population
Census	Pop.	Note	%±
2000	2,307		—
2010	4,003		73.5%
2020	4,410		10.2%
U.S. Decennial Census
