= Beaver Creek (Swatara Creek tributary) =

River in Pennsylvania, United States

Coordinates: 40.2663°N 76.7307°W

Beaver Creek is an 11.4-mile-long (18.3 km) tributary of Swatara Creek in Dauphin County, Pennsylvania, in the United States.

Beaver Creek joins the Swatara Creek near the borough of Hummelstown.

== Tributaries ==
- Nyes Run

== See also ==
- List of rivers of Pennsylvania
