= Linglestown, Pennsylvania =

Unincorporated community in Pennsylvania, US

- Census-designated place
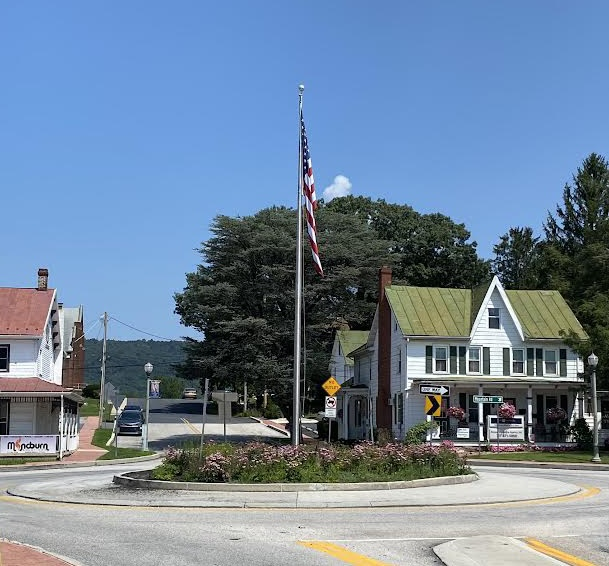
- The flagpole at Linglestown square July, 2023

- Location in Dauphin County and state of Pennsylvania
- Coordinates: 40°20′13″N 76°47′27″W
- Country: United States
- State: Pennsylvania
- County: Dauphin
- Township: Lower Paxton

Area
  - Total: 3.83 sq mi (9.91 km^{2})
  - Land: 3.83 sq mi (9.91 km^{2})
  - Water: 0 sq mi (0.00 km^{2})
- Elevation: 540 ft (160 m)

Population (2020)
  - Total: 6,539
  - Density: 1,708.8/sq mi (659.77/km^{2})
- Time zone: UTC-5 (Eastern (EST))
  - Summer (DST): UTC-4 (EDT)
- ZIP code: 17112
- FIPS code: 42-43672
- GNIS feature ID: 1179431

Linglestown is a census-designated place (CDP) in Lower Paxton Township, Pennsylvania, United States. It was founded and laid out in 1765 by Thomas Lingle.

The population was 6,539 at the 2020 census. It is part of the Harrisburg–Carlisle Metropolitan Statistical Area.

== History ==
In 1765, Thomas Lingle purchased a parcel of land in what was then Paxton Township, so as to develop a 90-plot living, working, and studying community for newly arriving European settlers. He called his new settlement "The Town of St. Thomas", after the Christian apostle, his namesake. The sheepskin document on which Lingle drew the plan for his village still exists, showing in great detail the village's name, each of the plots, their plot numbers, and all street and alley names. The county deed recorder's seal and record information are visible on the bottom left corner of the document.

In 1811, Lingle died and was buried in the Wenrich's Church cemetery (now St. Thomas United Church of Christ), at the east end of the village. Soon thereafter, village and area residents began calling his village "Lingle's town", and the name soon took on its current form.

As a busy crossroads community located at the base of the mountain, the village soon became the area center for commerce, civic, religious, and educational activities, much of which still exists today.

St. Thomas UCC is the village's oldest denomination. The Church of God denomination had its world beginning and first structure and cemetery in Linglestown.

=== Linglestown Square renovation ===
Since 1996, the village has been considering making improvements to the village square. At the center of the square is a flag pole located in the middle of the road. The initial plan was to move the flag pole and insert a traffic light. After long debate, that idea was shot down. It was replaced by the "Linglestown Plan", proposed on March 31, 2000. Nearly seven years later, on February 20, 2007, Lower Paxton Township approved a modified version of the Linglestown Action Plan, which involves the addition of roundabouts, other approaches to slowing down traffic through the square, and general community improvement. On September 11, 2009, PennDOT awarded a construction bid for the project to E. Wintermyer Co. of Etters.

While the road construction was intended not only to relieve traffic but also promote an aesthetic aspect in order to draw in business for Linglestown merchants, many of those merchants faced the brink of closing. The plan intended to address the issues with congestion and rush hour traffic, as well as safety concerns. In June 2010, the project entered its final phase. The roadways in the roundabouts were opened to two-way traffic, with the remainder of the road closed to two-way traffic until November 2010.

== Geography ==
Linglestown is located in northern Lower Paxton Township at 40°20′13″N 76°47′27″W (40.336888, -76.790764). It is bordered to the south by the community of Paxtonia, with the border between them formed by Interstate 81 and with access from Exit 72 (Mountain Road).

According to the United States Census Bureau, the CDP has a total area of 3.8 square miles (9.9 km^{2}), all land (except a few streams and ponds).

The highest elevation is 995 feet (303 m) on the south slope of Blue Mountain, along Blue Mountain Parkway north of the center of town. Pennsylvania Route 39 (Linglestown Road) passes east-to-west through the village, leading east 3.5 miles (5.6 km) to Exit 77 on Interstate 81 and west 5 miles (8 km) to Highway 22-322 at the north end of Harrisburg.

== Demographics ==
Historical population
Census	Pop.	Note	%±
2020	6,539		—
U.S. Decennial Census

As of the census of 2020, there were 6,539 people and 2,622 households in the CDP, out of which 20.8% had children under the age of 18 living with them, 19.7 had persons 65 years and older present, and 53.7 females present. The average household size was 2.43. The population density was 1,708.6 inhabitants per square mile (659.7/km^{2}). The racial makeup of the CDP was 77.1% White, 14.2% African American, 4.5% Asian, 4.2% from two or more races, and Hispanic or Latino of any race were 2.6% of the population.

As of the census of 2010, There were 2,508 households, out of which 32.6% had children under the age of 18 living with them, 63.6% were married couples living together, 9.3% had a female householder with no husband present, and 23.9% were non-families. 20.4% of all households were made up of individuals, and 7.4% had someone living alone who was 65 years of age or older. The average household size was 2.55 and the average family size was 2.95.

In the CDP, the population was spread out, with 23.0% under the age of 18, 6.0% from 18 to 24, 30.0% from 25 to 44, 27.9% from 45 to 64, and 13.1% who were 65 years of age or older. The median age was 40 years. For every 100 females, there were 94.1 males. For every 100 females age 18 and over, there were 90.7 males.

The median income for a household in the CDP was $77,699. The per capita income for the CDP was $38,825, and about 3.0% of the population were below the poverty line. 64.1% of the area population 16+ were in the civilian labor force.

== Schools ==
The Linglestown Elementary School mascot is the Lion. Their colors are navy blue and gold. The school was built in 1955, and underwent additions in 1995.

Linglestown Middle School was built in 1973 and has approximately 792 students. The mascot is a Ram and their colors are green and white. Recreational and educational activities include basketball, lacrosse, soccer, track and field, field hockey, and cheerleading. There are many groups such as the Linglestown Middle School band and chorus, as well as other themed clubs such as the History Classic Film Club and the Outdoor Sports Club. Linglestown Middle was formerly known as Linglestown Jr. High and until approximately 2005, the mascot was a Viking and the school colors were black and gold.

The schools are a part of the Central Dauphin School District. Primary transportation is provided by Durham School Services.

== Notable people ==
- Maynard Yingst, sprint car racer and drag racing national championship crew chief.

== Recreation ==
=== Koons Park ===
Koons Park is a popular park for children during the summer. It features three basketball courts, two volleyball courts, four tennis courts, three softball fields, three baseball diamonds, a football field and three pavilions, a concession stand and a playground. The pavilions provide several amenities, including charcoal grills, seating ranging from 64 to 112 people, electricity, water fountains, and are within close range of restrooms. In addition, Koons has restrooms and paved parking. It also has a pool which requires a membership to enter. It is a 33-acre (130,000 m^{2}) park in the heart of Linglestown.

During the summer, Koons features a July 4 fireworks display. This is sponsored by the Linglestown Fire Company and has been for the last decade. This usually takes place on a weekend around the holiday. This event attracts well over 2,000 people to the park.

== Infrastructure ==
=== Emergency services ===
Fire protection and emergency services in Linglestown are provided through the Lower Paxton Township Bureau of Fire, which coordinates multiple fire companies serving the township. The bureau oversees fire suppression, rescue services, and emergency response operations within Lower Paxton Township.

The Linglestown Fire Company, established in 1934, serves the northern portion of the township, including Linglestown. The company operates a modern fleet and is staffed by a combination of volunteer and career personnel.

== See also ==
- Pennsylvania Route 39
- Pennsylvania Route 894
- Linglestown Gazette online news service
