= Paxtonia, Pennsylvania =

Unincorporated community in Pennsylvania, US

- Census-designated place
- Location in Dauphin County and state of Pennsylvania.
- Coordinates: 40°19′4″N 76°47′28″W
- Country: United States
- State: Pennsylvania
- County: Dauphin
- Township: Lower Paxton

Area
  - Total: 2.31 sq mi (5.99 km^{2})
  - Land: 2.31 sq mi (5.99 km^{2})
  - Water: 0 sq mi (0.00 km^{2})
- Elevation: 520 ft (160 m)

Population (2020)
  - Total: 5,450
  - Density: 2,355.6/sq mi (909.49/km^{2})
- Time zone: UTC-5 (Eastern (EST))
  - Summer (DST): UTC-4 (EDT)
- ZIP code: 17112
- FIPS code: 42-58528
- GNIS feature ID: 1183408

Paxtonia is an unincorporated community and census-designated place (CDP) in Lower Paxton Township, Pennsylvania, United States. The population was 5,412 at the 2010 census. It is part of the Harrisburg–Carlisle Metropolitan Statistical Area.

== Geography ==
Paxtonia is located in the central part of Lower Paxton Township at 40°19′4″N 76°47′28″W (40.317888, -76.791032). It is bordered to the north by Linglestown and to the west by Colonial Park. Interstate 81 forms the northern edge of the CDP, separating it from Linglestown, with access from Exit 72 (Mountain Road). U.S. Route 22 (Allentown Boulevard) is the main highway through the center of Paxtonia. Downtown Harrisburg is 6 miles (10 km) to the west via US 22.

According to the United States Census Bureau, the CDP has a total area of 2.3 square miles (6.0 km^{2}), all land.

== Demographics ==
Historical population
Census	Pop.	Note	%±
1990	4,862		—
2000	5,254		8.1%
2010	5,412		3.0%
2020	5,450		0.7%
U.S. Decennial Census

As of the census of 2000, there were 5,254 people, 2,102 households, and 1,462 families residing in the CDP. The population density was 2,267.8 inhabitants per square mile (875.6/km^{2}). There were 2,188 housing units at an average density of 944.4 per square mile (364.6/km^{2}). The racial makeup of the CDP was 90.05% White, 5.46% African American, 0.08% Native American, 2.23% Asian, 0.04% Pacific Islander, 0.88% from other races, and 1.28% from two or more races. Hispanic or Latino of any race were 1.77% of the population.

There were 2,102 households, out of which 33.6% had children under the age of 18 living with them, 57.1% were married couples living together, 9.4% had a female householder with no husband present, and 30.4% were non-families. 25.4% of all households were made up of individuals, and 7.1% had someone living alone who was 65 years of age or older. The average household size was 2.48 and the average family size was 3.01.

In the CDP, the population was spread out, with 25.6% under the age of 18, 6.5% from 18 to 24, 31.9% from 25 to 44, 25.0% from 45 to 64, and 11.0% who were 65 years of age or older. The median age was 37 years. For every 100 females, there were 92.3 males. For every 100 females age 18 and over, there were 88.7 males.

The median income for a household in the CDP was $47,152, and the median income for a family was $55,045. Males had a median income of $36,985 versus $30,293 for females. The per capita income for the CDP was $23,279. About 3.4% of families and 5.4% of the population were below the poverty line, including 11.1% of those under age 18 and 2.2% of those age 65 or over.
