= South Hanover Township, Pennsylvania =

Township in Pennsylvania, US

Coordinates: 40°18′00″N 76°41′59″W

- Township
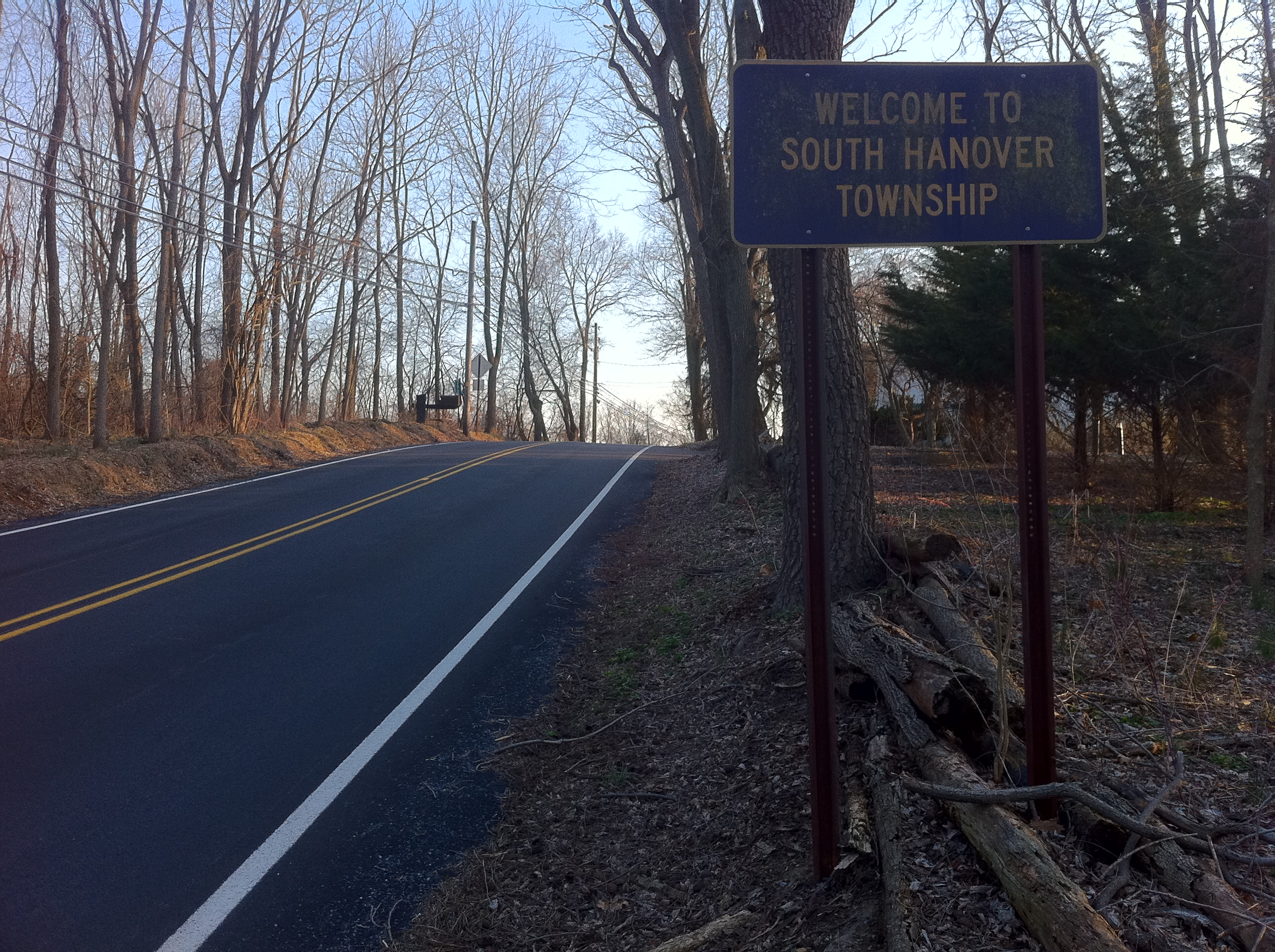

- Location in Dauphin County and state of Pennsylvania.
- Country: United States
- State: Pennsylvania
- County: Dauphin
- Incorporated: 1842

Area
  - Total: 11.40 sq mi (29.53 km^{2})
  - Land: 11.27 sq mi (29.20 km^{2})
  - Water: 0.12 sq mi (0.32 km^{2})

Population (2020)
  - Total: 7,206 ▲
  - Estimate (2023): 7,281
  - Density: 600.0/sq mi (231.68/km^{2})
- Time zone: UTC-5 (Eastern (EST))
  - Summer (DST): UTC-4 (EDT)
- Area code: 717
- FIPS code: 42-043-72200
- Website: www.southhanover.org

South Hanover Township is a township in Dauphin County, Pennsylvania, United States. The population was 7,206 at the 2020 census, an increase over the figure of 6,248 tabulated in 2010.

== History ==
South Hanover Township was originally a part of Paxtang Township, Lancaster County, Pennsylvania. On March 4, 1785, Dauphin County was formed from Lancaster County, with borders roughly matching those of Paxtang Township. By about 1787 Paxtang was separated into Upper, Middle and Lower Paxtang Townships. Lower Paxtang Township embraced the areas now known as Lower Swatara, Swatara, Lower Paxton, Derry and Susquehanna townships.

By action of the court of Lancaster in 1785, East Hanover and West Hanover townships separated from Derry Township.

On March 4, 1842, East and West Hanover townships of Dauphin County were finally designated as separate governmental precincts, and South Hanover separated from West Hanover. Hence, South Hanover was established in 1842 as 11.3 square miles (29 km^{2}).

In 1845, the village of Union Deposit was laid out. It had two dry goods stores, two shoe stores, one millinery, a tailor shop, a hotel, an iron ore furnace, a flour mill, a wagon factory, a warehouse, a brick yard, and two resident physicians. The early business activity was stimulated by the Union Canal, whose virgin barge trip occurred in 1828. The principal settlement in South Hanover Township from 1750 to 1791. The town was only a fort with six outposts. At one outpost (Milton Hershey Farm Unit 15) was a triangular tower used as a lookout. At the time of the fort, there were only two roads. In 1845, Phillip Wolfsberger and Issac Hershey laid out the land and called it the village of Union Deposit. The name came about due to the area's use as a place to deposit goods meant to be transported on the Union Canal. Much of Union Deposit's early commercial success as a principal settlement in South Hanover Township stems from the past relationship the area had with a canal along the Swatara Creek. The canal was an important component of the community and was instrumental in its growth.

Hoernerstown became a crossroads village from land originally owned by Major John Hoerner. It was named after the Major's father Andrew who emigrated from Prussia in 1755. A History of Hoernerstown by Edith Wert is eighteen pages of Enlightenment. Hoerner acquired a land grant, which was later divided into farms with a small portion left for the village. The southwestern and northern sections of South Hanover Township still remain primarily agricultural.

Sand Beach, the cluster of homes in the extreme eastern part of the township, lies at the point where Manada Creek flows into Swatara Creek and was originally called "Manadaville". The town is known for the 220-foot (67 m) covered bridge built in 1906 that crossed Swatara Creek between Derry Township and South Hanover Township. The bridge, restored by Hershey Enterprises in 1964, burned the night of September 3, 1966. Business and industry in this little town included a sawmill, grist mill, cabinet shop, store and schoolhouse.

The original Hanover Township was organized at a session of the Lancaster County Court in 1736–1737. In 1785 it was divided into two separate and distinct townships, named East Hanover and West Hanover. These two townships were divided by Raison Creek until 1813, when Lebanon County was split away from Dauphin County. This split placed East Hanover Township in Lebanon County and West Hanover Township in Dauphin County. On March 4, 1842, the original West Hanover Township was split into East and South Hanover townships.

== Geography ==
According to the United States Census Bureau, South Hanover Township has a total area of 11.4 square miles (29.5 km^{2}), of which 11.3 square miles (29.2 km^{2}) is land and 0.1 square miles (0.3 km^{2}), or 1.10%, is water.

== Demographics ==
Historical population
Census	Pop.	Note	%±
2010	6,248		—
2020	7,206		15.3%
2023 (est.)	7,281		1.0%
U.S. Decennial Census

As of the census of 2000, there were 4,793 people, 1,706 households, and 1,400 families residing in the township. The population density was 425.8 inhabitants per square mile (164.4/km^{2}). There were 1,772 housing units at an average density of 157.4 per square mile (60.8/km^{2}). The racial makeup of the township was 97.62% White, 0.33% African American, 0.29% Native American, 0.94% Asian, 0.08% from other races, and 0.73% from two or more races. Hispanic or Latino of any race were 0.79% of the population.

There were 1,706 households, out of which 39.6% had children under the age of 18 living with them, 71.6% were married couples living together, 7.0% had a female householder with no husband present, and 17.9% were non-families. 14.5% of all households were made up of individuals, and 4.5% had someone living alone who was 65 years of age or older. The average household size was 2.81 and the average family size was 3.12.

In the township the population was spread out, with 27.8% under the age of 18, 6.2% from 18 to 24, 25.8% from 25 to 44, 29.7% from 45 to 64, and 10.6% who were 65 years of age or older. The median age was 40 years. For every 100 females, there were 100.5 males. For every 100 females age 18 and over, there were 96.7 males.

The median income for a household in the township was $64,010, and the median income for a family was $67,288. Males had a median income of $47,188 versus $29,797 for females. The per capita income for the township was $29,213. About 1.7% of families and 1.5% of the population were below the poverty line, including 2.0% of those under age 18 and 1.0% of those age 65 or over.
