= Sandbeach, Pennsylvania =

Unincorporated community in Pennsylvania, US

- Unincorporated community
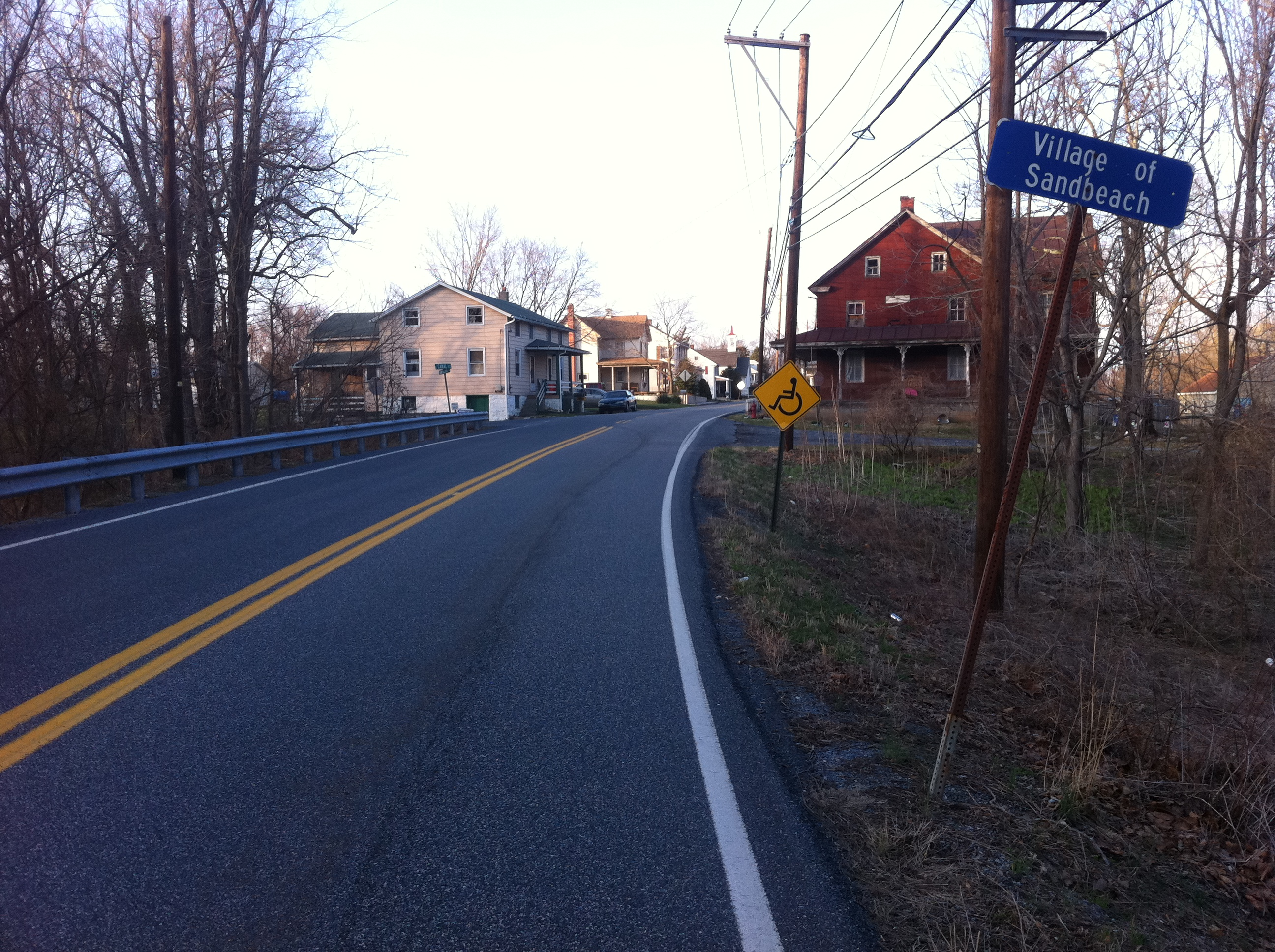
- Southwestern approach to Sandbeach

- Location within Pennsylvania
- Coordinates: 40°18′32″N 76°40′5″W
- Country: United States
- State: Pennsylvania
- County: Dauphin
- Township: South Hanover
- Elevation: 361 ft (110 m)
- Time zone: UTC-5 (Eastern (EST))
  - Summer (DST): UTC-4 (EDT)
- Area code: 717

Sand Beach (variant name Sandbeach) is an unincorporated community in South Hanover Township, Dauphin County, Pennsylvania, United States, situated in the Harrisburg-Carlisle Metropolitan Statistical Area, in the vicinity of the census-designated place of Hershey. It lies at the point where the smaller Manada Creek joins the Swatara Creek.

It was founded as Manadaville. The village would later take its name after a post office in the area.

== Sand Beach Covered Bridge ==
The Sand Beach Covered Bridge or Church Ford Covered Bridge was a 220-foot (67 m) Burr arch truss covered bridge built in 1853 and again in 1906 that crossed Swatara Creek between Derry Township and South Hanover Township. The bridge, restored by Hershey Enterprises in 1964, burned the night of September 3, 1966.
