= East Hanover Township, Dauphin County, Pennsylvania =

Township in Pennsylvania, US

Coordinates: 40°25′00″N 76°41′59″W

- Township
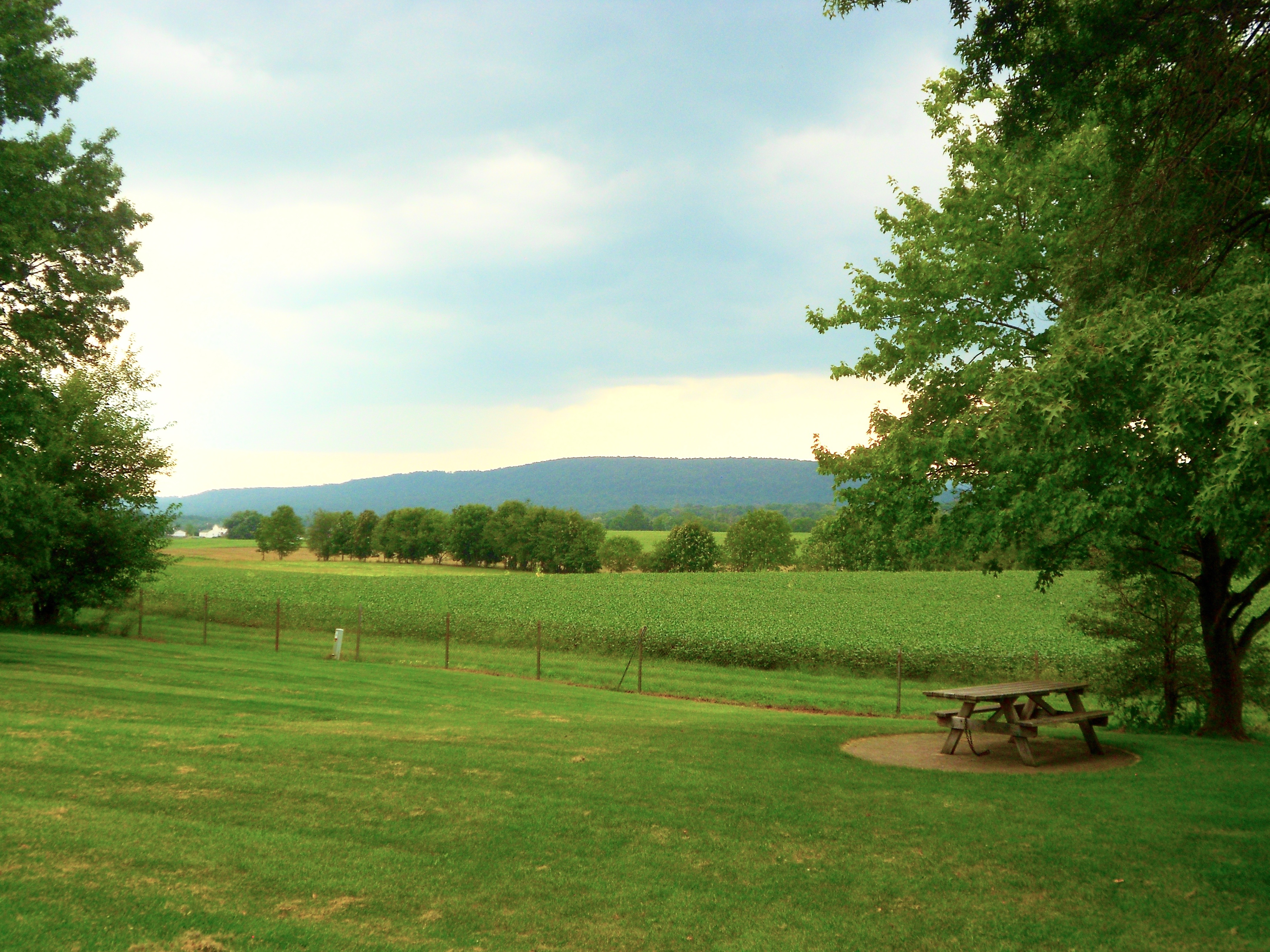
- View from I-81 rest stop, looking north

- Flag Seal

- Location in Dauphin County and state of Pennsylvania.
- Country: United States
- State: Pennsylvania
- County: Dauphin
- Settled: 1717
- Incorporated: 1842

Government
  - Type: Board of Commissioners

Area
  - Total: 40.22 sq mi (104.17 km^{2})
  - Land: 40.20 sq mi (104.12 km^{2})
  - Water: 0.019 sq mi (0.05 km^{2})

Population (2020)
  - Total: 6,021 ▲
  - Estimate (2023): 5,979
  - Density: 146.0/sq mi (56.39/km^{2})
- Time zone: UTC-5 (Eastern (EST))
  - Summer (DST): UTC-4 (EDT)
- Area code: 717
- FIPS code: 42-043-21208
- Website: easthanovertwpdcpa.org

East Hanover Township is a township in Dauphin County, Pennsylvania, United States. The population was 6,021 at the 2020 census.

== History ==
The township traces its roots to the founding of the Hanover (Presbyterian) church in 1735. Hanover parish broke off of the Derry parish (modern day Hershey) to serve settlers north of the Swatara Creek. The original church is gone, but the cemetery remains between the village of Grantville and the base of the blue mountain.

Hanover Township was later divided into East Hanover, West Hanover, and South Hanover townships. When Lebanon County was formed in 1813, East Hanover Township was partitioned to form East Hanover Township, Lebanon County.

The John Todd House was added to the National Register of Historic Places in 1988.

== Geography ==
East Hanover Township is in eastern Dauphin County, with its eastern border following the Lebanon County line. According to the United States Census Bureau, the township has a total area of 40.2 square miles (104.2 km^{2}), of which 0.02 square miles (0.05 km^{2}), or 0.05%, is water.

The unincorporated community of Grantville is near the eastern border of the township and is the primary mailing address. Shellsville is located southwest of Grantville and south of the geographic center of the township.

Interstate 81 crosses the township from east to west, with access from Exit 80 (Grantville). U.S. Route 22 (Allentown Boulevard) is a four-lane divided highway that runs south of and parallel to I-81.

The Ridge-and-Valley Appalachians occupy the northern half of the township. From south to north, the parallel ridges that cross the township are Blue Mountain, Second Mountain, Sharp Mountain, and Stony Mountain, which forms the northern border of the township. The Appalachian Trail crosses the northern part of the township, crossing Stony Mountain and following Sharp Mountain.

== Demographics ==
Historical population
Census	Pop.	Note	%±
2010	5,718		—
2020	6,021		5.3%
2023 (est.)	5,979		−0.7%
U.S. Decennial Census

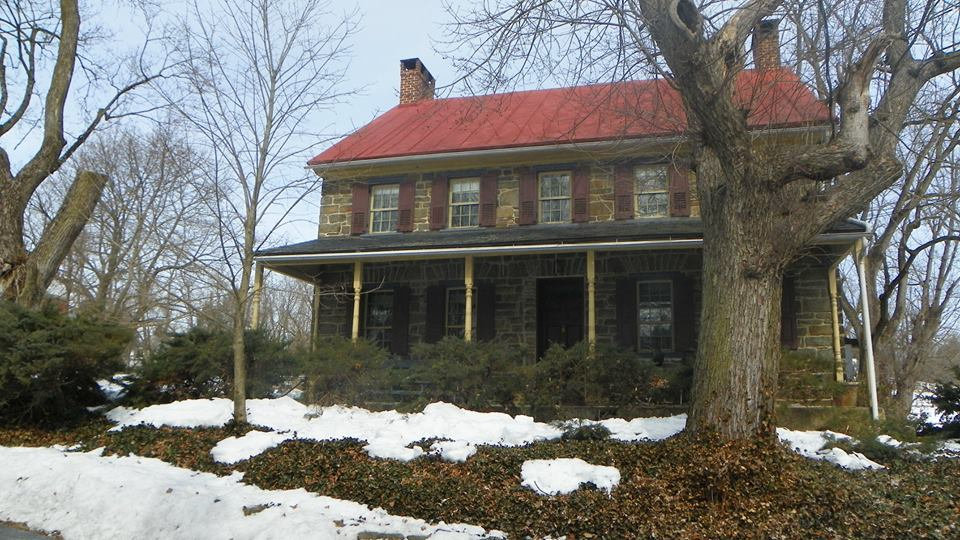
John Todd House

As of the census of 2000, there were 5,322 people, 1,966 households, and 1,527 families residing in the township. The population density was 133.4 inhabitants per square mile (51.5/km^{2}). There were 2,043 housing units at an average density of 51.2 per square mile (19.8/km^{2}). The racial makeup of the township was 96.96% White, 0.71% African American, 0.13% Native American, 0.41% Asian, 0.70% from other races, and 1.09% from two or more races. Hispanic or Latino of any race were 1.90% of the population.

There were 1,966 households, out of which 38.0% had children under the age of 18 living with them, 64.4% were married couples living together, 9.3% had a female householder with no husband present, and 22.3% were non-families. 17.5% of all households were made up of individuals, and 5.8% had someone living alone who was 65 years of age or older. The average household size was 2.70 and the average family size was 3.04.

As of 2016, the township's population had a wide distribution of ages; 27.2% under the age of 18, 6.2% from 18 to 24, 30.1% from 25 to 44, 26.5% from 45 to 64, and 10.0% who were 65 years of age or older. The median age was 38 years. For every 100 females, there were 99.1 males. For every 100 females age 18 and over, there were 97.8 males.

The median income for a household in the township was $52,009, and the median income for a family was $60,674. Males had a median income of $38,004 versus $25,196 for females. The per capita income for the township was $23,296. About 2.1% of families and 2.8% of the population were below the poverty line, including 3.6% of those under age 18 and 4.7% of those age 65 or over.
