= West Hanover Township, Pennsylvania =

Township in Pennsylvania, US

Coordinates: 40°23′00″N 76°43′59″W

- Township
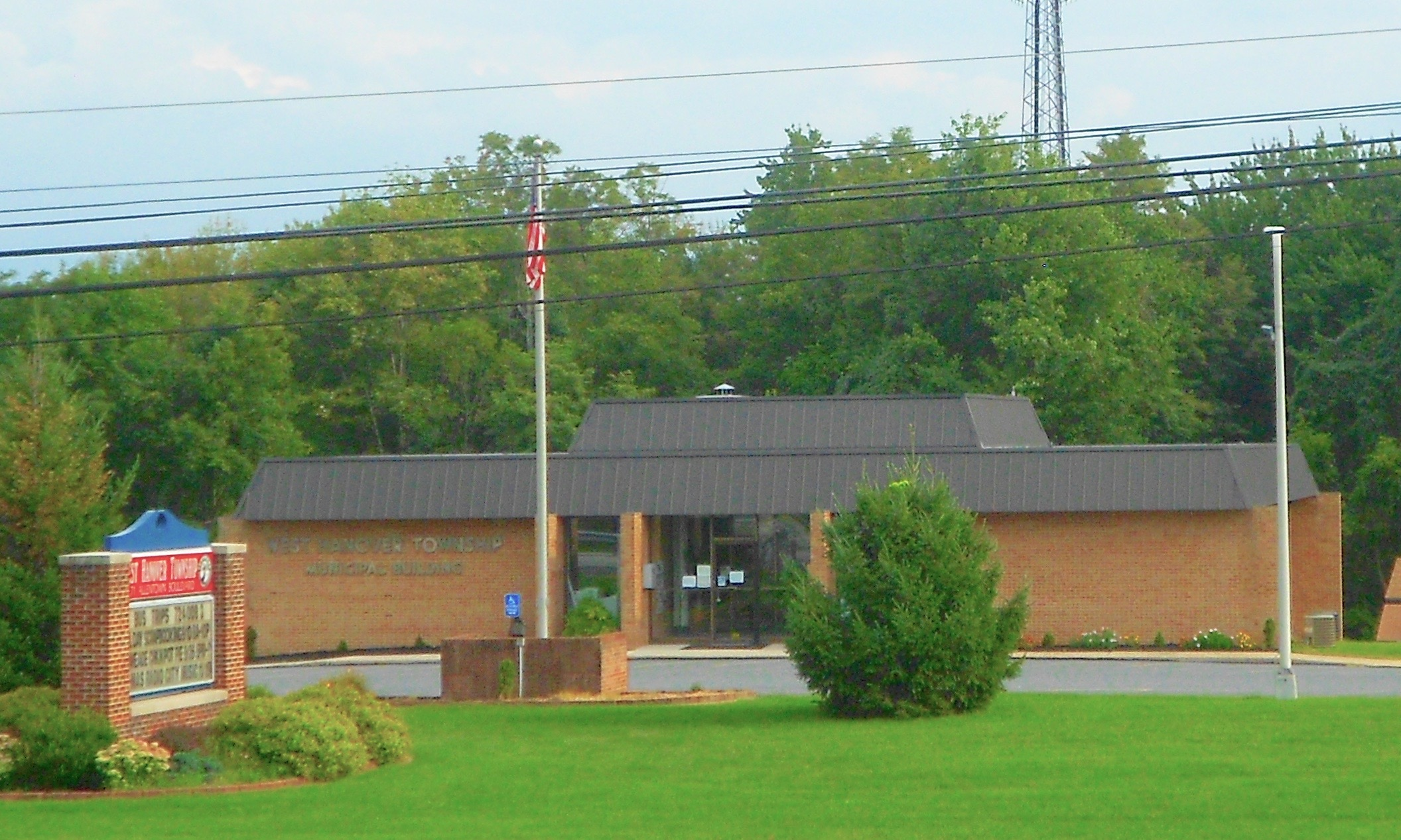
- Municipal Building

- Location in Dauphin County and state of Pennsylvania.
- Country: United States
- State: Pennsylvania
- County: Dauphin
- Incorporated: 1842

Area
  - Total: 23.22 sq mi (60.13 km^{2})
  - Land: 23.21 sq mi (60.12 km^{2})
  - Water: 0 sq mi (0.00 km^{2})

Population (2020)
  - Total: 10,696 ▲
  - Estimate (2023): 11,120
  - Density: 432.6/sq mi (167.04/km^{2})
- Time zone: UTC-5 (Eastern (EST))
  - Summer (DST): UTC-4 (EDT)
- Area code: 717
- FIPS code: 42-043-83128
- Website: www.westhanover.com

West Hanover Township is a township in Dauphin County, Pennsylvania, United States. The population was 10,696 at the 2020 census, an increase over the figure of 9,343 tabulated in 2010.

== History ==
Hanover Township of Dauphin County was divided into East Hanover, West Hanover, and South Hanover townships.

== Geography ==
According to the United States Census Bureau, the township has a total area of 23.2 square miles (60.1 km^{2}), all land. The unincorporated community and census-designated place of Skyline View is in the southern part of the township. Ritzie Village is north of the intersection of PA 443 and Mountain Road in the northern part of the township. Also contained in the township are the villages of Piketown and Manadahill.

== Demographics ==
Historical population
Census	Pop.	Note	%±
2010	9,343		—
2020	10,696		14.5%
2023 (est.)	11,120		4.0%
U.S. Decennial Census

The earliest US census figures reveal a total population of 1,862 residents in the year 1800. As of the census of 2000, there were 6,505 people, 2,502 households, and 1,944 families residing in the township. The population density was 278.1 inhabitants per square mile (107.4/km^{2}). There were 2,584 housing units at an average density of 110.5 per square mile (42.7/km^{2}). The racial makeup of the township was 97.34% White, 1.15% African American, 0.03% Native American, 1.00% Asian, 0.03% Pacific Islander, 0.11% from other races, and 0.34% from two or more races. Hispanic or Latino of any race were 0.54% of the population.

There were 2,502 households, out of which 29.4% had children under the age of 18 living with them, 68.7% were married couples living together, 6.1% had a female householder with no husband present, and 22.3% were non-families. 18.4% of all households were made up of individuals, and 8.3% had someone living alone who was 65 years of age or older. The average household size was 2.60 and the average family size was 2.96.

In the township the population was spread out, with 22.5% under the age of 18, 5.6% from 18 to 24, 27.6% from 25 to 44, 29.1% from 45 to 64, and 15.1% who were 65 years of age or older. The median age was 42 years. For every 100 females, there were 98.8 males. For every 100 females age 18 and over, there were 95.1 males.

The median income for a household in the township was $53,144, and the median income for a family was $57,009. Males had a median income of $41,158 versus $31,230 for females. The per capita income for the township was $21,723. About 2.4% of families and 3.1% of the population were below the poverty line, including 2.2% of those under age 18 and 3.3% of those age 65 or over.

== Notable people ==
- Dan Hartman
- Ashbel Green Simonton
