= Linds Crossing, Pennsylvania =

Unincorporated community in Pennsylvania, US

- Census-designated place
- Location within Pennsylvania Location within the United States
- Coordinates: 40°26′20″N 78°19′11″W
- Country: United States
- State: Pennsylvania
- County: Blair
- Township: Frankstown

Area
  - Total: 0.23 sq mi (0.59 km^{2})
  - Land: 0.21 sq mi (0.54 km^{2})
  - Water: 0.019 sq mi (0.05 km^{2})
- Elevation: 902 ft (275 m)

Population (2020)
  - Total: 142
  - Density: 677.2/sq mi (261.48/km^{2})
- Time zone: UTC-5 (Eastern (EST))
  - Summer (DST): UTC-4 (EDT)
- ZIP Code: 16648 (Hollidaysburg)
- Area codes: 814/582
- FIPS code: 42-43628
- GNIS feature ID: 2805519

Linds Crossing is a census-designated place (CDP) in Blair County, Pennsylvania, United States. Comprising the unincorporated communities of Linds Crossing and Upper Reese, it was first listed as a CDP prior to the 2020 census.

The CDP is east of the center of Blair County, at the center of Frankstown Township. It sits on the north side of the Frankstown Branch of the Juniata River, approximately 4 miles (6 km) east of Hollidaysburg. The CDP is reached by Juniata Valley Road from U.S. Route 22 in Geeseytown; Juniata Valley Road continues east past Reese back to US 22 at Canoe Creek.

== Demographics ==
Historical population
Census	Pop.	Note	%±
2020	142		—
U.S. Decennial Census

== Education ==
The school district is Hollidaysburg Area School District.
