= Sylvan Hills =

Sylvan Hills may refer to:

== Places in the United States ==
- Sylvan Hills, Atlanta, Georgia, a neighborhood
- Sylvan Hills, Pennsylvania, a census-designated place
- Sylvan Hills Country Club Golf Course, Sherwood, Arkansas; listed on the National Register of Historic Places

== Education ==
- Sylvan Hills High School, Sherwood, Arkansas
- Sylvan Hills Middle School (disambiguation), multiple instances
