= Moore's Mill =

Moore's Mill may refer to:

- Battle of Moore's Mill in the American Civil War
- Moores Mill, Alabama
- Moores Mill, Pennsylvania
- Cottageville, West Virginia, also known as Moores Mill
- Moore's Mill, a historic mill of the Atlanta area

== See also ==
- Moores Mills (disambiguation)
