= Moores Mill, Pennsylvania =

Unincorporated community in Pennsylvania, US

- Census-designated place
- Location within Pennsylvania Location within the United States
- Coordinates: 40°29′35″N 78°15′59″W
- Country: United States
- State: Pennsylvania
- County: Blair
- Township: Frankstown

Area
  - Total: 0.066 sq mi (0.17 km^{2})
  - Land: 0.066 sq mi (0.17 km^{2})
  - Water: 0 sq mi (0.00 km^{2})
- Elevation: 955 ft (291 m)

Population (2020)
  - Total: 57
  - Density: 891.4/sq mi (344.19/km^{2})
- Time zone: UTC-5 (Eastern (EST))
  - Summer (DST): UTC-4 (EDT)
- ZIP Code: 16648 (Hollidaysburg)
- Area codes: 814/582
- FIPS code: 42-50860
- GNIS feature ID: 2805527

Moores Mill is a census-designated place (CDP) in Blair County, Pennsylvania, United States. It was first listed as a CDP prior to the 2020 census.

The CDP is in eastern Blair County, in the northeastern portion of Frankstown Township. It is on the east side of Beaver Dam Road in the valley of Canoe Creek, a southward-flowing tributary of the Frankstown Branch of the Juniata River, part of the Susquehanna River watershed. Canoe Creek State Park is to the west, across Beaver Dam Road, and Canoe Mountain rises 900 feet (270 m) above the valley to the east.

Moores Mill is 1.5 miles (2.4 km) north of U.S. Route 22 at the community of Canoe Creek and 8 miles (13 km) northeast of Hollidaysburg.

== Demographics ==
Historical population
| Census | Pop. | Note | %± |
|---|---|---|---|
| 2020 | 57 | | — |
U.S. Decennial Census

== Education ==
The school district is Hollidaysburg Area School District.
