= Geeseytown, Pennsylvania =

Unincorporated community in Pennsylvania, US

- Census-designated place
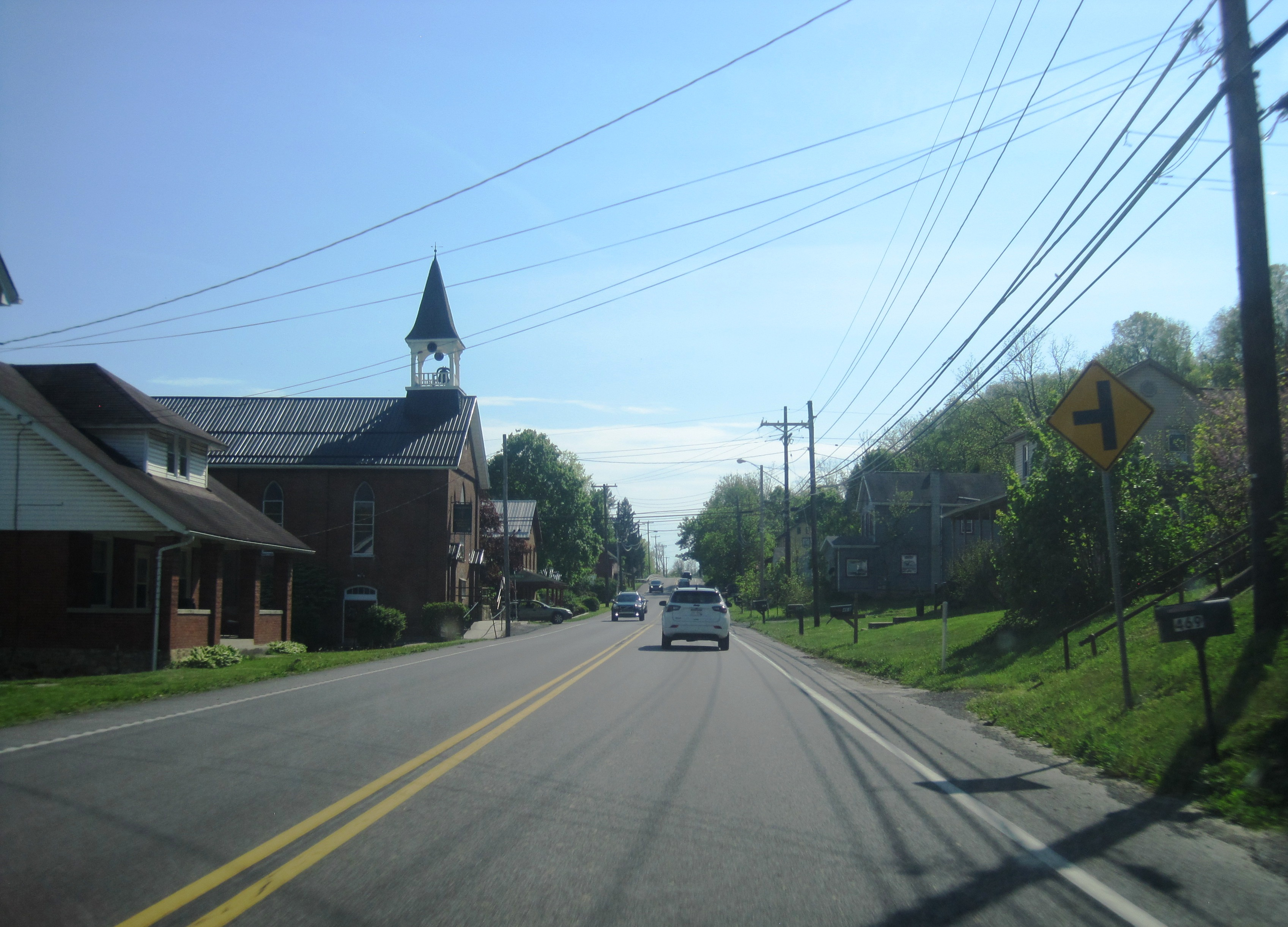
- Westbound US 22 in Geeseytown

- Location within Pennsylvania Location within the United States
- Coordinates: 40°27′06″N 78°20′38″W
- Country: United States
- State: Pennsylvania
- County: Blair
- Township: Frankstown

Area
  - Total: 0.16 sq mi (0.42 km^{2})
  - Land: 0.16 sq mi (0.42 km^{2})
  - Water: 0 sq mi (0.00 km^{2})
- Elevation: 991 ft (302 m)

Population (2020)
  - Total: 107
  - Density: 663.5/sq mi (256.19/km^{2})
- Time zone: UTC-5 (Eastern (EST))
  - Summer (DST): UTC-4 (EDT)
- ZIP Code: 16648 (Hollidaysburg)
- Area codes: 814/582
- FIPS code: 42-28696
- GNIS feature ID: 2805506

Geeseytown is an unincorporated community and census-designated place (CDP) in Blair County, Pennsylvania, United States. It was first listed as a CDP prior to the 2020 census.

The CDP is in central Blair County, in the western part of Frankstown Township. U.S. Route 22 passes through the community, leading southwest 3 miles (5 km) to Hollidaysburg and northeast 4 miles (6 km) to Canoe Creek. Geeseytown is on the north side of the valley of the Frankstown Branch Juniata River, one of the main headwater branches of the Juniata River which leads east to the Susquehanna.

== Demographics ==
Historical population
Census	Pop.	Note	%±
2020	107		—
U.S. Decennial Census

== Education ==
The school district is Hollidaysburg Area School District.
