= Frankstown, Pennsylvania =

Unincorporated community in Pennsylvania, US

- Census-designated place
- Location within Pennsylvania Location within the United States
- Coordinates: 40°26′38″N 78°21′17″W
- Country: United States
- State: Pennsylvania
- County: Blair
- Township: Frankstown

Area
  - Total: 0.058 sq mi (0.15 km^{2})
  - Land: 0.058 sq mi (0.15 km^{2})
  - Water: 0 sq mi (0.00 km^{2})
- Elevation: 945 ft (288 m)

Population (2020)
  - Total: 96
  - Density: 1,677.1/sq mi (647.54/km^{2})
- Time zone: UTC-5 (Eastern (EST))
  - Summer (DST): UTC-4 (EDT)
- ZIP Code: 16648 (Hollidaysburg)
- Area codes: 814/582
- FIPS code: 42-27592
- GNIS feature ID: 2805501

Frankstown is an unincorporated community and census-designated place (CDP) in Blair County, Pennsylvania, United States. It was first listed as a CDP prior to the 2020 census.

The CDP is in central Blair County, on the west side of Frankstown Township. It is bordered to the southeast by U.S. Route 22, which leads southwest 2.5 miles (4.0 km) to Hollidaysburg and east 25 miles (40 km) to Huntingdon. The community and surrounding township give their name to the Frankstown Branch Juniata River, which passes the CDP just south of US-22.

== Demographics ==
Historical population
Census	Pop.	Note	%±
2020	96		—
U.S. Decennial Census

== Education ==
The school district is Hollidaysburg Area School District.
