= Sylvan Hills, Pennsylvania =

Unincorporated community in Pennsylvania, US

- Census-designated place
- Location within Pennsylvania Location within the United States
- Coordinates: 40°26′55″N 78°23′02″W
- Country: United States
- State: Pennsylvania
- County: Blair
- Township: Frankstown

Area
  - Total: 0.38 sq mi (0.99 km^{2})
  - Land: 0.38 sq mi (0.99 km^{2})
  - Water: 0 sq mi (0.0 km^{2})
- Elevation: 1,158 ft (353 m)
- Time zone: UTC-5 (Eastern (EST))
  - Summer (DST): UTC-4 (EDT)
- ZIP Code: 16648 (Hollidaysburg)
- Area codes: 814/582
- FIPS code: 42-75936
- GNIS feature ID: 2805570

Sylvan Hills is a census-designated place (CDP) in Blair County, Pennsylvania, United States. It was first listed as a CDP prior to the 2020 census.

The CDP is in central Blair County, in the northwest part of Frankstown Township. It is bordered to the south by the borough of Hollidaysburg, the county seat, and it is 5 miles (8 km) south of Altoona, the largest city in the county.

== Education ==
The school district is Hollidaysburg Area School District.
