= U.S. Route 22 in Pennsylvania =

Highway in Pennsylvania

U.S. Route 22
- US 22 highlighted in red and business routes in blue

Route information
- Maintained by PennDOT and DRJTBC
- Length: 338.20 mi (544.28 km)
- Existed: 1926–present

Major junctions
- West end: US 22 at the West Virginia state line in Paris
- PA Turnpike 576 in Robinson Township, Washington County; I-376 / US 30 / Orange Belt / PA 60 in Robinson Township, Allegheny County; I-79 near Carnegie; I-279 / US 19 Truck in Pittsburgh; I-76 Toll / Penna Turnpike / US 22 Bus. in Monroeville; I-99 / US 220 in Duncansville; I-81 / US 322 near Harrisburg; I-83 / US 322 in Lower Paxton Township; I-78 from Fredericksburg to Kuhnsville; I-476 Toll / Penna Turnpike NE Extension in South Whitehall Township
- East end: US 22 at the New Jersey state line in Easton

Location
- Country: United States
- State: Pennsylvania
- Counties: Washington, Allegheny, Westmoreland, Indiana, Cambria, Blair, Huntingdon, Mifflin, Juniata, Perry, Dauphin, Lebanon, Berks, Lehigh, Northampton

Highway system
- United States Numbered Highway System; List; Special; Divided; Pennsylvania State Route System; Interstate; US; State; Scenic; Legislative
← PA 21	→ PA 22

U.S. Route 22 (US 22) is an east–west United States Numbered Highway that stretches from Cincinnati, Ohio, in the west, to Newark, New Jersey, in the east. In Pennsylvania, the route runs for 338.20 miles (544.28 km) between the West Virginia state line in Washington County, where it is a freeway through the western suburbs of Pittsburgh, and then runs east to Easton and the New Jersey state line in the Lehigh Valley region of eastern Pennsylvania.

Much of US 22 in Pennsylvania follows the route of the historic William Penn Highway. The portion from the Pennsylvania Route 66 (PA 66) interchange near Delmont east to the Interstate 81 (I-81) interchange near Harrisburg is the main part of Corridor M of the Appalachian Development Highway System, although a large portion near the center of the route has not yet been upgraded to a four-lane divided highway.

Between Fredericksburg and just west of Allentown, US 22 runs concurrently with I-78. From Allentown to the New Jersey state line, the route is a freeway named the Lehigh Valley Thruway.

== Route description ==
=== West Virginia to Pittsburgh ===
US 22 enters Pennsylvania from West Virginia in Washington County, heading east as a four-lane freeway named William Penn Highway. The route runs through rural areas with some development, curving northeast and then east again before coming to a partial cloverleaf interchange with PA 18 near The Pavilion at Star Lake. Past this interchange, the freeway continues east and crosses Raccoon Creek before curving southeast and reaching a diamond interchange with Maple Grove Road that serves Bavington, Pennsylvania.

Following this, US 22 heads east again and comes to a three-level diamond interchange with the PA 576 toll road.

US 22 enters Allegheny County and immediately reaches a partial cloverleaf interchange with the northern terminus of PA 980, where it also passes over the Montour Trail. From here, the freeway continues east through rural land with some development to a partial cloverleaf interchange with Kelso Road that provides access to Noblestown. The route curves northeast and reaches a partial cloverleaf interchange with US 30 and the northern terminus of PA 978.

At this point, US 30 heads east in concurrency with US 22. US 22/US 30 run east as a four-lane freeway through suburban areas, coming to a partial cloverleaf interchange with Oakdale Road that serves Hankey Farms. Farther east, the freeway has a westbound exit and eastbound entrance with McKee Road that provides access to the borough of Oakdale to the south. From here, US 22/US 30 turn east-northeast and reach an interchange that connects to Old Steubenville Pike, Bayer Road, and Montour Church Road. The freeway comes to an interchange with I-376, where US 22/US 30 head southeast concurrent with I-376, and PA 60 begins by heading east (south) at-grade along a four-lane divided highway.

I-376/US 22/US 30 head southeast as the four-lane Penn-Lincoln Parkway, reaching an interchange with Ridge Road. The freeway comes to a westbound exit and eastbound entrance with Campbells Run Road, where it widens to six lanes. The highway curves to the east and meets I-79 at an interchange.

Past this interchange, I-376/US 22/US 30 narrows to two lanes eastbound and head into the borough of Rosslyn Farms, turning southeast and coming to a westbound exit and eastbound entrance with Rosslyn Road that serves Rosslyn Farms. The freeway crosses into the borough of Carnegie and reaches a bus-only eastbound exit and westbound entrance connecting to Pittsburgh Regional Transit (PRT)'s West Busway before passing over a Pittsburgh and Ohio Central Railroad line. The highway passes over Chartiers Creek and another Pittsburgh and Ohio Central Railroad line as it leaves Carnegie and comes to the PA 50 interchange.

I-376/US 22/US 30 narrows to four lanes, passing under a Wheeling and Lake Erie Railway line and curving northeast into the borough of Green Tree. The freeway reaches the PA 121 interchange, where it gains a third westbound lane, and heads east, entering Pittsburgh and coming to a westbound exit and eastbound entrance with Parkway Center Drive.

The highway turns north and reaches a westbound exit and eastbound entrance with US 19, where US 19 joins I-376/US 22/US 30 on the Penn-Lincoln Parkway. Within this interchange, the road has an eastbound runaway truck ramp and passes under a ramp carrying both directions of US 19 Truck.

The freeway widens to six lanes and passes under a Wheeling and Lake Erie Railway line before reaching an interchange with PA 51, where US 19 Truck joins the Penn-Lincoln Parkway from PA 51 and US 19 splits from the Penn-Lincoln Parkway by heading north along with PA 51. Past this interchange, I-376/US 22/US 30/US 19 Truck narrows to four lanes and passes under Mount Washington in the Fort Pitt Tunnel.

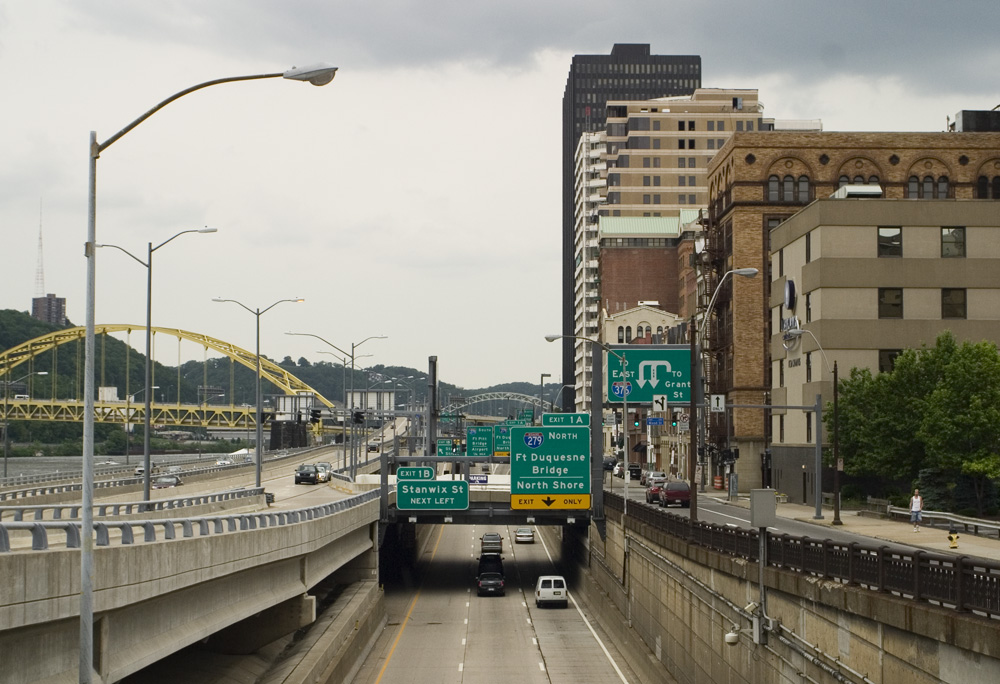
US 22 westbound concurrent with I-376 and US 30 on the Penn-Lincoln Parkway in Pittsburgh

After emerging from the Fort Pitt Tunnel, the freeway passes over Norfolk Southern Railway's Mon Line and PA 837, coming to a westbound exit and eastbound entrance that connects to northbound PA 837. The Penn-Lincoln Parkway heads onto the Fort Pitt Bridge, a double-decker bridge carrying four lanes in each direction, and passes over CSX Transportation's Pittsburgh Subdivision railroad line and the Monongahela River as it heads into Downtown Pittsburgh at Point State Park and comes to an interchange with the southern terminus of I-279, where US 19 Truck heads north along I-279 and I-376/US 22/US 30 continue east along the Penn-Lincoln Parkway. The I-279 interchange also includes eastbound exits and westbound entrances with Boulevard of the Allies/Liberty Avenue and Fort Duquesne Boulevard that serve Downtown Pittsburgh. The four-lane freeway heads east-southeast between Downtown Pittsburgh to the north and the Monongahela River to the south, reaching a partial interchange with Stanwix Street with no eastbound exit. The highway heads under the Smithfield Street Bridge and comes to an interchange with Grant Street, where it widens to six lanes. I-376/US 22/US 30 pass under the Panhandle Bridge carrying PRT's Pittsburgh Light Rail line and then the Liberty Bridge before the lanes split as it reaches a westbound ramp to Second Avenue north of the South Tenth Street Bridge and south of the Duquesne University campus.

Past this, the highway continues east between urban areas to the north and the Monongahela River to the south, with the Three Rivers Heritage Trail in the median. The freeway comes to an interchange connecting to PA 885 and Forbes Avenue north of the Birmingham Bridge, at which point the trail leaves the median of the freeway and the river heads further south from the freeway. I-376/US 22/US 30 head southeast, with the Three Rivers Heritage Trail parallel to the south, and reaches a westbound exit and eastbound entrance with PA 885. The highway turns east away from the trail and passes over the Allegheny Valley Railroad's P&W Subdivision line. The freeway comes to an interchange with Beechwood Boulevard before it narrows to four lanes and passes under the southern portion of Squirrel Hill in the Squirrel Hill Tunnel. Past the tunnel, I-376/US 22/US 30 head through wooded areas and pass over Ninemile Run in Frick Park. The highway leaves Pittsburgh as it comes to an interchange with Braddock Avenue that serves the boroughs of Edgewood and Swissvale. The freeway continues east through suburban areas in Edgewood, passing under Norfolk Southern Railway's Pittsburgh Line and PRT's Martin Luther King Jr. East Busway. I-376/US 22/US 30 turn to the northeast and head through a corner of the borough of Braddock Hills before entering the borough of Wilkinsburg. In Wilkinsburg, the freeway comes to an interchange with the southern terminus of PA 8, where US 30 splits from I-376/US 22 on the Penn-Lincoln Parkway by heading southeast at-grade on Ardmore Boulevard.

=== Pittsburgh to Hollidaysburg ===
Past this interchange, I-376/US 22 continue northeast through suburban development, crossing into the borough of Churchill and reaching an eastbound exit and westbound entrance with Greensburg Pike. From here, the freeway narrows to four lanes and curves east, coming to an interchange with PA 130. The highway widens back to six lanes and continues southeast, reaching an interchange serving the western terminus of US 22 Business (US 22 Bus.) and PA 791, where it turns to the east and leaves Churchill. I-376/US 22 continue east through suburbs and the road enters the borough of Monroeville upon crossing over Thompson Run and a Union Railroad line. The freeway curves southeast and comes to an interchange providing access to the eastern terminus of US 22 Bus., PA 48, and the Pennsylvania Turnpike (I-76) at the Pittsburgh interchange. At this point, US 22 splits from I-376, which ends at the Pennsylvania Turnpike (I-76), and continues east along William Penn Highway, a four-lane divided highway with at-grade intersections. The road runs through suburban development, curving southeast and reaching an interchange with the western terminus of PA 286 that consists of an eastbound exit and westbound entrance, with the westbound exit and eastbound entrance provided by an at-grade intersection with a short connector. Past PA 286, the route winds to the east.

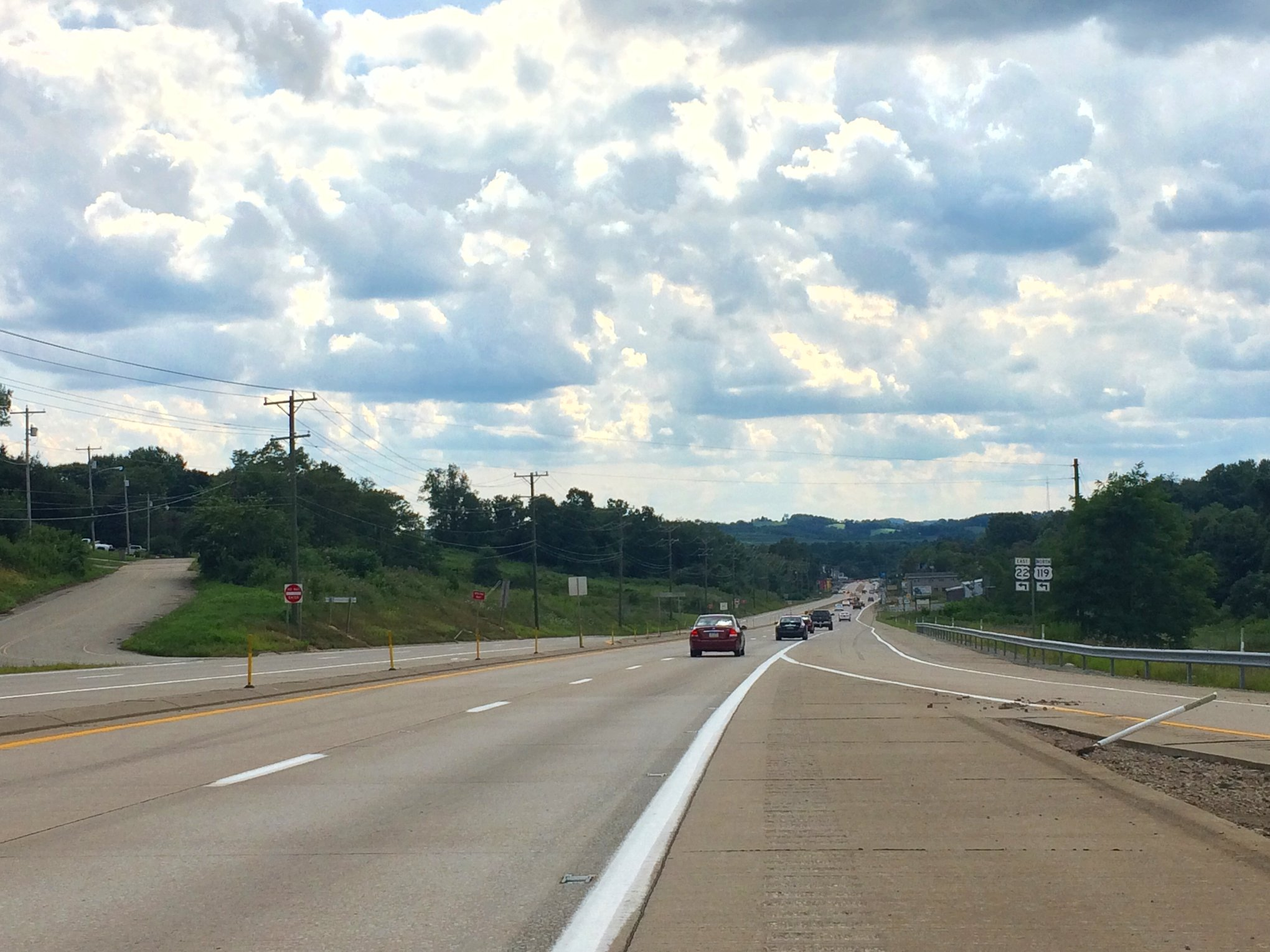
US 22 westbound/US 119 southbound in Derry Township

US 22 leaves Monroeville and enters the borough of Murrysville in Westmoreland County, where it continues east through suburban areas along William Penn Highway, a four-lane divided highway with occasional jughandles. The road curves to the east-southeast and passes over the Westmoreland Heritage Trail and Turtle Creek. The route continues past a mix of rural areas and development, passing to the south of the borough of Export and crosses Turtle Creek again before leaving Murrysville. US 22 curves east and comes to a single-point urban interchange with PA 66 south of the borough of Delmont. Past this interchange, the road runs east-northeast through rural areas with occasional development, turning east and coming to an intersection with PA 819 in Five Points. The route continues east and reaches a junction with US 119 near Shieldsburg. At this point, US 119 turns east to run concurrent with US 22 along William Penn Highway. The road comes to a bridge over Loyalhanna Creek within the Loyalhanna Lake National Recreation Area and enters the borough of New Alexandria. At this point, the two routes pass north of developed areas of the borough and reach an intersection with PA 981 along the northern border of New Alexandria. From here, US 22/US 119 continue northeast through rural land with some development, passing to the north of Keystone Raceway. The road curves to the east and comes to a junction with the northern terminus of PA 982. Past this intersection, the two routes run through more rural areas, curving back to the northeast.

Upon crossing the Conemaugh River, US 22/US 119 enter the borough of Blairsville in Indiana County and pass over Norfolk Southern Railway's Conemaugh Line before reaching an interchange with PA 217. The road runs east through developed areas, passing over Lear Road, before it leaves Blairsville and comes to a bridge over Norfolk Southern Railway's Blairsville Industrial Track line. The two routes run east-northeast through commercial areas before coming to a partial cloverleaf interchange where US 119 splits from US 22 by heading to the northeast. From here, US 22 continues east along four-lane divided William Penn Highway through rural areas with occasional development, crossing Chestnut Ridge. Farther east, the route curves to the southeast and reaches an interchange with PA 259. The road turns back to the east and passes south of Clyde. US 22 intersects West Philadelphia Street, which heads east to the borough of Armagh, and becomes a freeway that bypasses Armagh to the north. The route comes to a partial cloverleaf interchange with PA 56 that provides access to Armagh. The road continues east and has an eastbound right-in/right-out interchange with East Philadelphia Street before it reaches a partial cloverleaf interchange with PA 403. At the PA 403 interchange, the freeway section ends and US 22 continues east-southeast as a four-lane divided highway with at-grade intersections through rural land with some development.

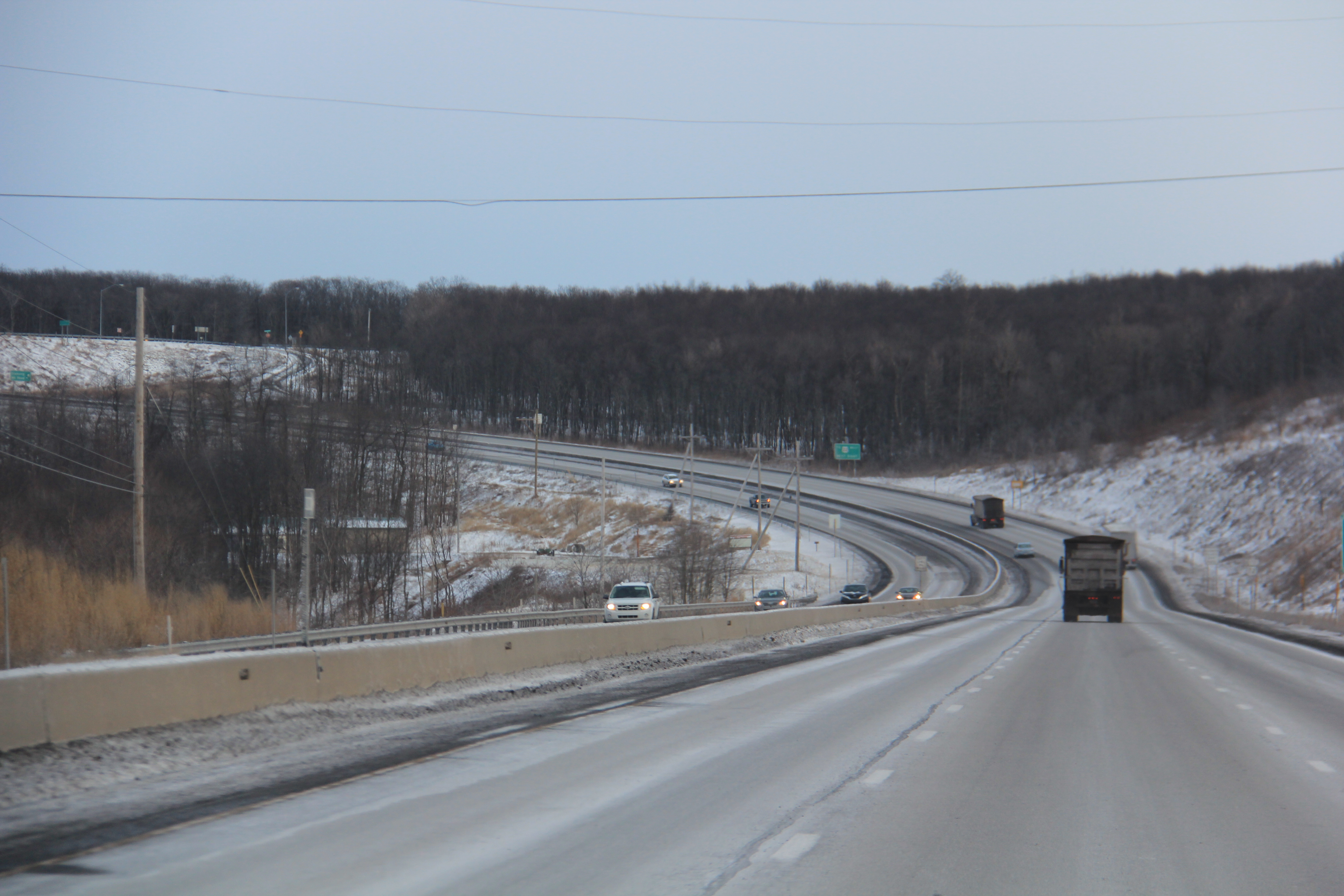
US 22 eastbound in Jackson Township

US 22 crosses into Cambria County, where the name of the road becomes Admiral Peary Highway. The route gains a third eastbound lane as it ascends Laurel Ridge. The road comes to a partial cloverleaf interchange with Dishong Mountain Road. Past this interchange, US 22 turns east-northeast and reaches the summit of the ridge before it descends Laurel Ridge as a four-lane divided highway, passing through a section of Gallitzin State Forest. The route continues through rural areas with some development and passes through Chickaree before curving to the east. The road comes to a partial cloverleaf interchange with PA 271 south of the borough of Nanty Glo. Past this interchange, US 22 continues east through rural land, turning to the northeast. The route heads near development and passes southeast of Ebensburg Airport before it reaches a cloverleaf interchange with the US 219 freeway. The road runs through commercial areas and comes to a partial trumpet interchange with High Street that provides access to the borough of Ebensburg; this interchange has no westbound exit. At this point, US 22 curves to the east and bypasses Ebensburg to the south by running along its southern border, passing over PA 160 with no access. The road runs near developed areas and comes to a partial cloverleaf interchange with Rowena Drive/Admiral Peary Highway on the eastern edge of Ebensburg. Following this interchange, the route becomes an unnamed four-lane freeway and continues east through rural areas, passing under an abandoned railroad line. US 22 turns southeast and makes a curve to the east before reaching a diamond interchange with the western terminus of PA 164 near Munster. The freeway continues southeast and passes over Norfolk Southern Railway's Pittsburgh Line prior to coming to a partial cloverleaf interchange with PA 53 south of the borough of Cresson. The route curves to the northeast and reaches a diamond interchange with Admiral Peary Highway east of Cresson. Following this interchange, US 22 makes a turn to the east and comes to a partial cloverleaf interchange with Tunnelhill Road south of the borough of Tunnelhill that provides access to the Allegheny Portage Railroad National Historic Site to the south.

At the interchange with Tunnelhill Road, US 22 enters Blair County and begins to descend through Blair Gap, heading northeast before winding to the east as it heads through rural areas. The freeway turns to the southeast and heads into developed areas to the south of Altoona. US 22 comes to a double trumpet interchange with the southern terminus of PA 764, where US 22 splits to the south onto an unnamed four-lane divided highway with at-grade intersections while the freeway continues east to an interchange with I-99/US 220. The route heads south-southwest through a mix of rural areas and development, with two sections where the median turns into a center left-turn lane. The four-lane divided highway curves to the east-southeast and comes to an intersection with US 220 Bus., which heads to the south. At this point, US 22 turns east-northeast for a concurrency with US 220 Bus. on two-lane undivided 3rd Avenue, entering the borough of Duncansville. The road runs through developed areas of the borough, passing under I-99/US 220. The two routes gain a center left-turn lane and leave Duncansville, crossing a Norfolk Southern Railway line and then Norfolk Southern Railway's Cove Secondary railroad line at-grade before US 220 Bus. splits from US 22 by heading to the north. From here, US 22 heads east as Broad Street as it runs parallel to the Cove Secondary to the south, entering the borough of Hollidaysburg. The road narrows to two lanes before it crosses Beaverdam Branch and becomes South Juniata Street. The route turns east-northeast onto Blair Street and heads away from the railroad tracks, coming to an intersection with PA 36. US 22 turns northeast and runs between developed areas to the northwest and a railroad yard to the southeast before it crosses a Norfolk Southern Railway spur at-grade and curves east, leaving Hollidaysburg.

=== Hollidaysburg to Harrisburg ===
East of Hollidaysburg, US 22 becomes an unnamed two-lane undivided road and heads into rural areas with some development, curving northeast and passing through Frankstown, where it briefly gains a center left-turn lane. The road runs through Geeseytown before it turns east and gains a second eastbound lane, bending back to the northeast again. The route narrows back to two lanes and heads through Canoe Creek, where it passes to the south of Canoe Creek State Park. US 22 continues northeast and runs parallel to the Frankstown Branch Juniata River to the southeast, heading away from the river before reaching an intersection with the northern terminus of PA 866. Past this intersection, the road widens to four lanes and curves to the north, turning to the east as it passes to the south of Canoe Mountain. The route makes a curve to the northeast and narrows to one eastbound lane and then one westbound lane a short distance later, heading into the Canoe Valley. US 22 briefly gains a second westbound lane before passing through Yellow Springs. The road continues northeast through rural land, gaining a second westbound lane for a short stretch before it becomes two lanes again.

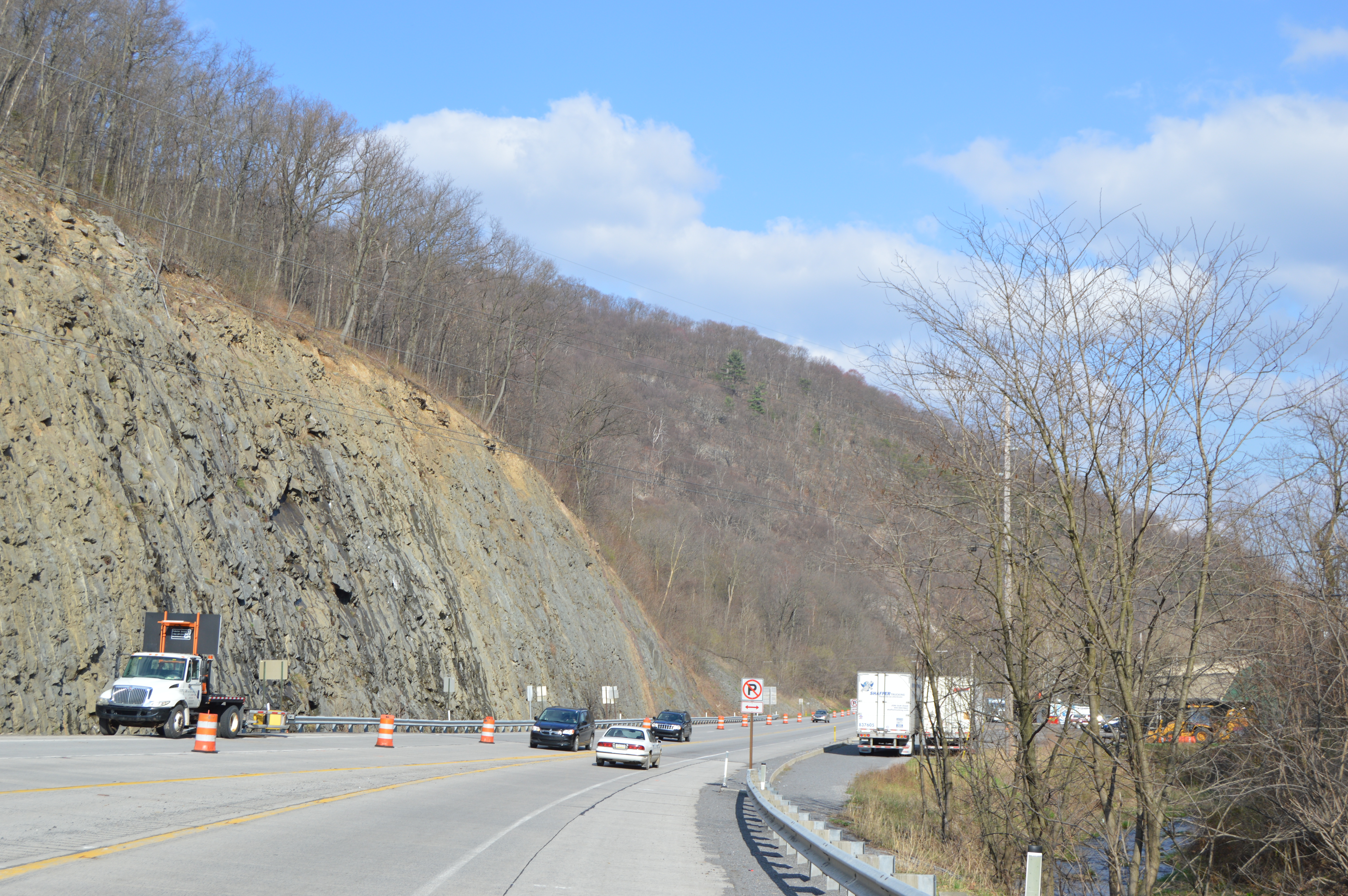
US 22 eastbound in Morris Township

US 22 enters Huntingdon County and continues northeast through rural areas along William Penn Highway, briefly widening to two eastbound lanes. The route turns into a three-lane road with two westbound lanes and one westbound lane, passing over Goodman and Shaffersville roads before reaching an intersection with the southern terminus of PA 453 in Water Street. US 22 curves east as a three-lane road with a center left-turn lane and runs a short distance to the north of the Frankstown Branch Juniata River, passing through a gap in Tussey Mountain. The road turns to the southeast and crosses the river near Alfarata, continuing though rural land with some development and coming to an intersection with the western terminus of PA 305 south of the borough of Alexandria. The route curves south and becomes a four-lane undivided road. US 22 turns to the southeast and narrows to one eastbound lane as it traverses Warrior Ridge, briefly becoming a two-lane road before gaining a second eastbound lane. Farther southeast, the road heads into commercial areas and turns into a four-lane divided highway as it comes to a partial cloverleaf interchange with PA 26. The route turns into a three-lane road with a center left-turn lane that bypasses the borough of Huntingdon to the south, passing over a Norfolk Southern Railway spur and reaching an interchange with Fairgrounds Road consisting of a two-way quadrant ramp. The road curves east and passes over the Juniata River and Norfolk Southern Railway's Pittsburgh Line before coming to an interchange with Penn Street that provides access to Huntingdon and PA 26.

Past this interchange, US 22 turns to the southeast and runs parallel to the Juniata River and the Pittsburgh Line, running through rural areas with some development as a three-lane road with two westbound lanes and one eastbound lane and passing over Numers Hollow Road, where it becomes three lanes with a center left-turn lane. The route passes through Ardenheim before it curves more to the east and reaches an intersection with the northern terminus of PA 829. The road curves southeast and enters the borough of Mill Creek, running through developed areas and coming to a junction with PA 655. At this point, PA 655 joins US 22 in a concurrency and the two routes head south-southeast. The road narrows to two lanes before it leaves Mill Creek, where it heads south thorough rural areas to the east of the river and railroad line and gains a second westbound lane before becoming three lanes with two eastbound lanes and one westbound lane. PA 655 splits from US 22 by heading to the southwest, with US 22 continuing south and briefly becoming four lanes before narrowing to one lane eastbound. The route turns to the east and briefly becomes three lanes with a center turn lane before narrowing to two lanes and running east through a gap in Jacks Mountain a short distance to the north of the Juniata River and the Pittsburgh Line. Farther east, the road gains a second westbound lane.

US 22 enters Mifflin County and becomes an unnamed three-lane road with a center left-turn lane, passing through Lucy Furnace and coming to an intersection with the northern terminus of PA 747. Following this, the route becomes a four-lane road and turns into a divided highway before it reaches a junction with US 522 north of the borough of Mount Union on the opposite side of the Juniata River. At this point, US 522 joins US 22 in a concurrency and the road becomes undivided again, turning to the north and narrowing to two lanes. The road runs through rural areas with some development in a valley between Jacks Mountain to the northwest and the Juniata River further to the southeast, curving to the northeast. US 22/US 522 passes through Atkinson Mills before it enters the borough of McVeytown. Here, the road gains a center left-turn lane and heads through developed areas, curving to the north and running a short distance to the west of the Juniata River. The two routes leave McVeytown and narrow to two lanes, turning northeast to pass through more rural land to the northwest of the river. US 22/US 522 runs further northwest from the Juniata River. The road gains a center left-turn lane and continues through a mix of rural areas and development, heading through Strodes Mills before losing the center turn lane. Farther northeast, US 22/US 522 turns into a four-lane freeway called the Vietnam Veterans Memorial Highway and reaches a trumpet interchange with the western terminus of US 22 Bus., which heads northeast into the borough of Lewistown. From here, the freeway crosses to the north side of Big Ridge as it bypasses Lewistown to the northwest, reaching a directional T interchange with the US 322 freeway. At this point, US 22/US 522 become concurrent with US 322 and the freeway has an interchange with Electric Avenue. From here, the freeway enters the borough of Lewistown and runs to the west of the Kishacoquillas Creek. US 522 splits from US 22/US 322 at an interchange by heading northeast on East Walnut Street. At the US 522 interchange, the freeway passes over a Juniata Valley Railroad line. Past this interchange, US 22/US 322 curves south along the eastern border of Lewistown and crosses a Juniata Valley Railroad line at-grade before reaching an eastbound exit and westbound entrance with East Charles Street. The freeway crosses the Kishacoquillas Creek and leaves Lewistown upon crossing Jacks Creek and heading into rural areas. The two routes curve east and come to a westbound exit and eastbound entrance with the eastern terminus of US 22 Bus., at which point the freeway begins to run along the north bank of the Juniata River, while the Pittsburgh Line runs on the south bank. US 22/US 322 curves to the northeast and runs between Shade Mountain to the north and the river to the south as it heads through the Lewistown Narrows water gap. This section of road includes the longest mechanically stabilized earth wall in the U.S.

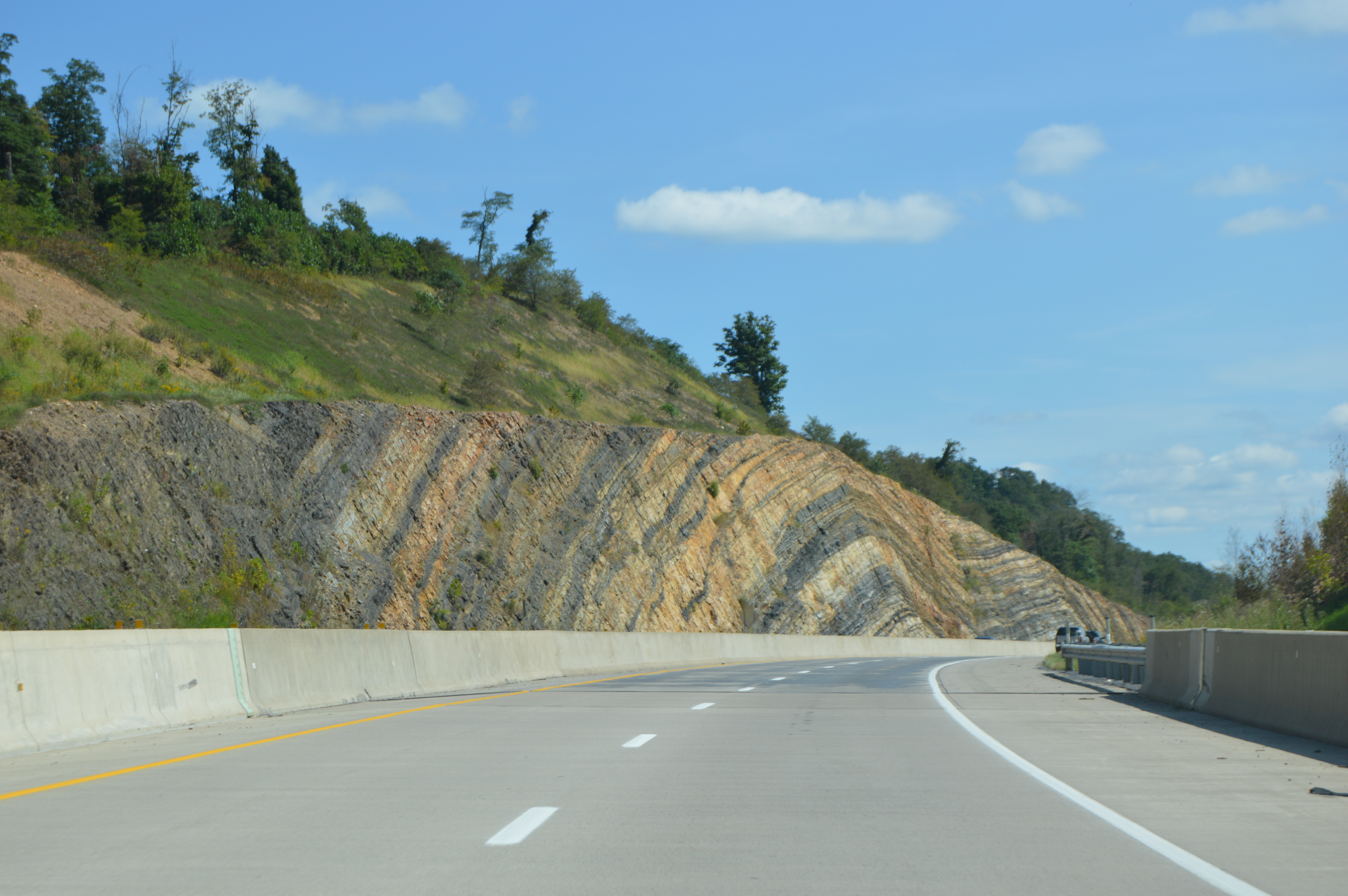
US 22/US 322 freeway eastbound in Fermanagh Township passing a rock cut

US 22/US 322 enters Juniata County and continues through the water gap, coming to an eastbound access point to a fishing and boating area along the Juniata River. Farther east, the freeway curves to the southeast and exits the Lewistown Narrows, heading further from the river and coming to a diamond interchange with Arch Rock Road. The two routes head northeast and then southeast, crossing Lost Creek before turning south and reaching a diamond interchange with PA 35 east of the borough of Mifflintown. US 22/US 322 comes to a partial cloverleaf interchange with the northern terminus of PA 75 northeast of the borough of Port Royal. The freeway continues southeast, turning to the east-northeast. Farther east, the two routes come to a partial cloverleaf interchange with PA 333 on the northern border of the borough of Thompsontown. Past Thompsontown, US 22/US 322 has a westbound exit and eastbound entrance with Pfoutz Valley Road. After this interchange, the freeway runs closely parallel to the north bank of the Juniata River as it passes through a water gap in Tuscarora Mountain.

US 22/US 322 crosses into Perry County, where the freeway and the parallel Juniata River turn southeast out of the water gap. The freeway enters the borough of Millerstown and runs between the river to the west and the borough to the east, passing over PA 17. After leaving the borough, the two routes come to an interchange with West Juniata Parkway that provides access to PA 17 and Millerstown. US 22/US 322 continues through rural areas further east from the Juniata River. The freeway curves south as it passes west of Buffalo Mountain, making a turn east away from the river and reaching a diamond interchange with PA 34 northeast of the borough of Newport. Past this interchange, the two routes begin to parallel the Juniata River again, turning southeast and then east. US 22/US 322 reaches a westbound exit and eastbound entrance with Meadow Grove Road that provides access to Midway and curves southeast alongside the river. The freeway continues south-southeast and reaches an interchange with Huggins Road that serves Watts; this interchange consists of a left exit and entrance eastbound and a right exit and entrance westbound. The two routes continue south parallel to the Juniata River and reach an interchange connecting to River Road that serves Amity Hall.

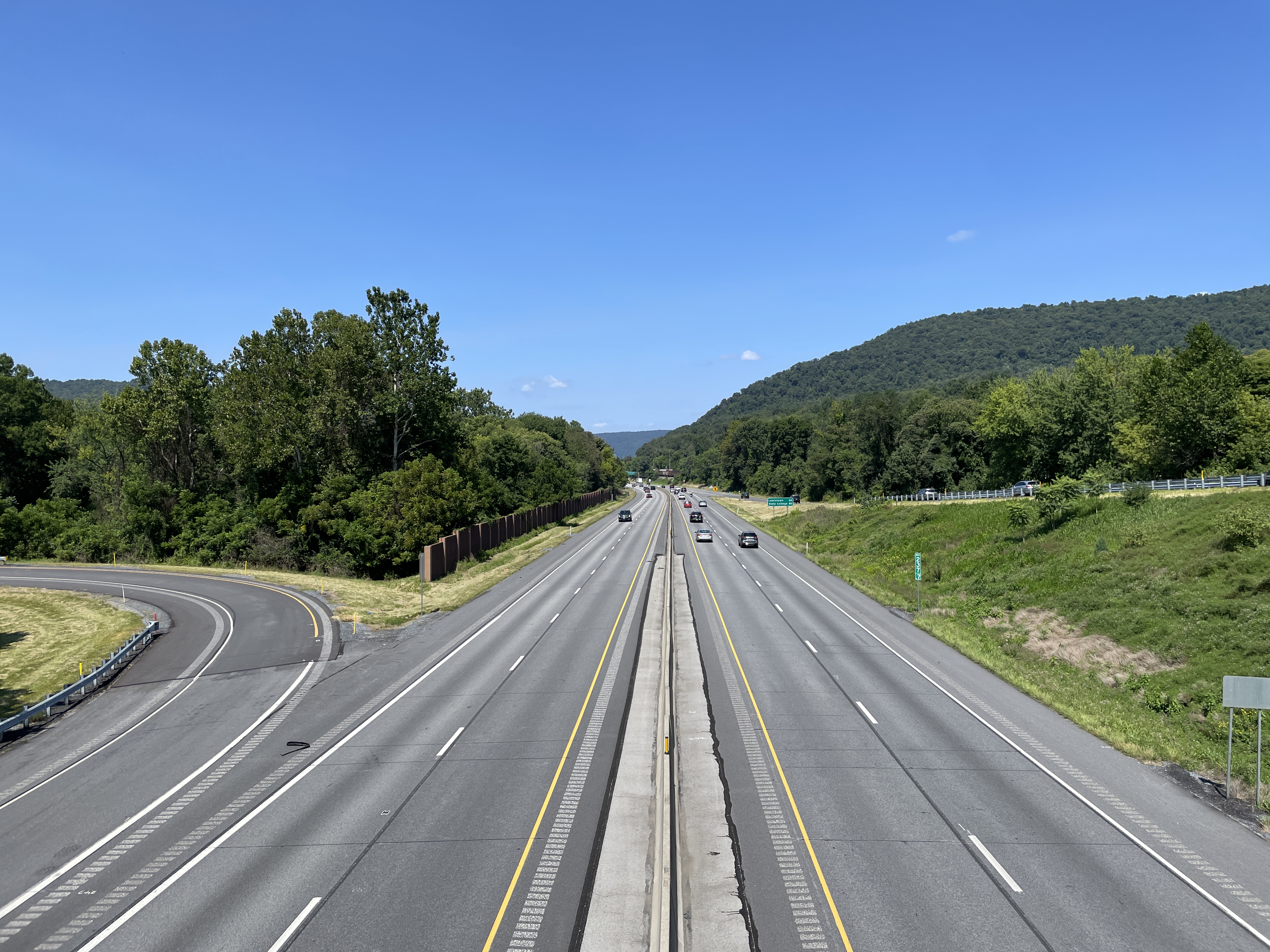
US 22/US 322 westbound at the PA 443 interchange in Middle Paxton Township

US 22/US 322 enters Dauphin County and comes to a modified cloverleaf interchange with the US 11/US 15 freeway. Past this interchange, the freeway ends and the roadway becomes Benvenue Road, a four-lane divided highway. The two routes run through a mix of rural areas and businesses on Duncan Island between the Juniata River to the west and the Susquehanna River to the east. US 22/US 322 intersects the eastern terminus of PA 849 east of the borough of Duncannon, where the road becomes a freeway again. At this point, the unnamed freeway crosses the Susquehanna River on the Clarks Ferry Bridge, which also carries the Appalachian Trail. After crossing the river, the two routes come to a directional T interchange with the southern terminus of PA 147, where the Appalachian Trail splits to the south. Following this interchange, US 22/US 322 turns southwest and runs between the Susquehanna River to the northwest and Norfolk Southern's Buffalo Line to the southeast. The freeway curves southeast along with the parallel river and railroad tracks as it passes west of Peters Mountain. The two routes pass over the Norfolk Southern line and come to a diamond interchange with PA 325 in Speeceville.

Past this interchange, US 22/US 322 heads east-southeast through rural areas to the north of the Susquehanna River and Norfolk Southern Railway's Buffalo Line, curving to the east. The freeway reaches a directional T interchange with the southern terminus of PA 225 that serves the borough of Dauphin. From here, the two routes turn southeast and enter the borough of Dauphin, passing near developed areas. The freeway crosses Stony Creek before coming to a westbound exit providing access to Allegheny Street and heading under the railroad line. US 22/US 322 leaves Dauphin and heads southeast between the Susquehanna River to the west and the Norfolk Southern Railway line to the east as it passes west of Second Mountain. Past the mountain, the freeway runs near developed areas farther from the river and comes to a partial cloverleaf interchange with PA 443 in Fort Hunter. The two routes continue south-southeast, crossing over Norfolk Southern Railway's Buffalo Line and passing to the west of Blue Mountain. US 22/US 322 heads southeast parallel to Norfolk Southern Railway's Pittsburgh Line to the west and reaches a diamond interchange with PA 39, where the parallel railroad line heads further west from the road. At this point, the freeway enters Harrisburg and runs between Wildwood Park to the west and developed areas to the east, curving south and crossing Paxton Creek before coming to a stack interchange with I-81. At this point, US 322 splits from US 22 by heading east concurrent with I-81.

=== Harrisburg to New Jersey ===
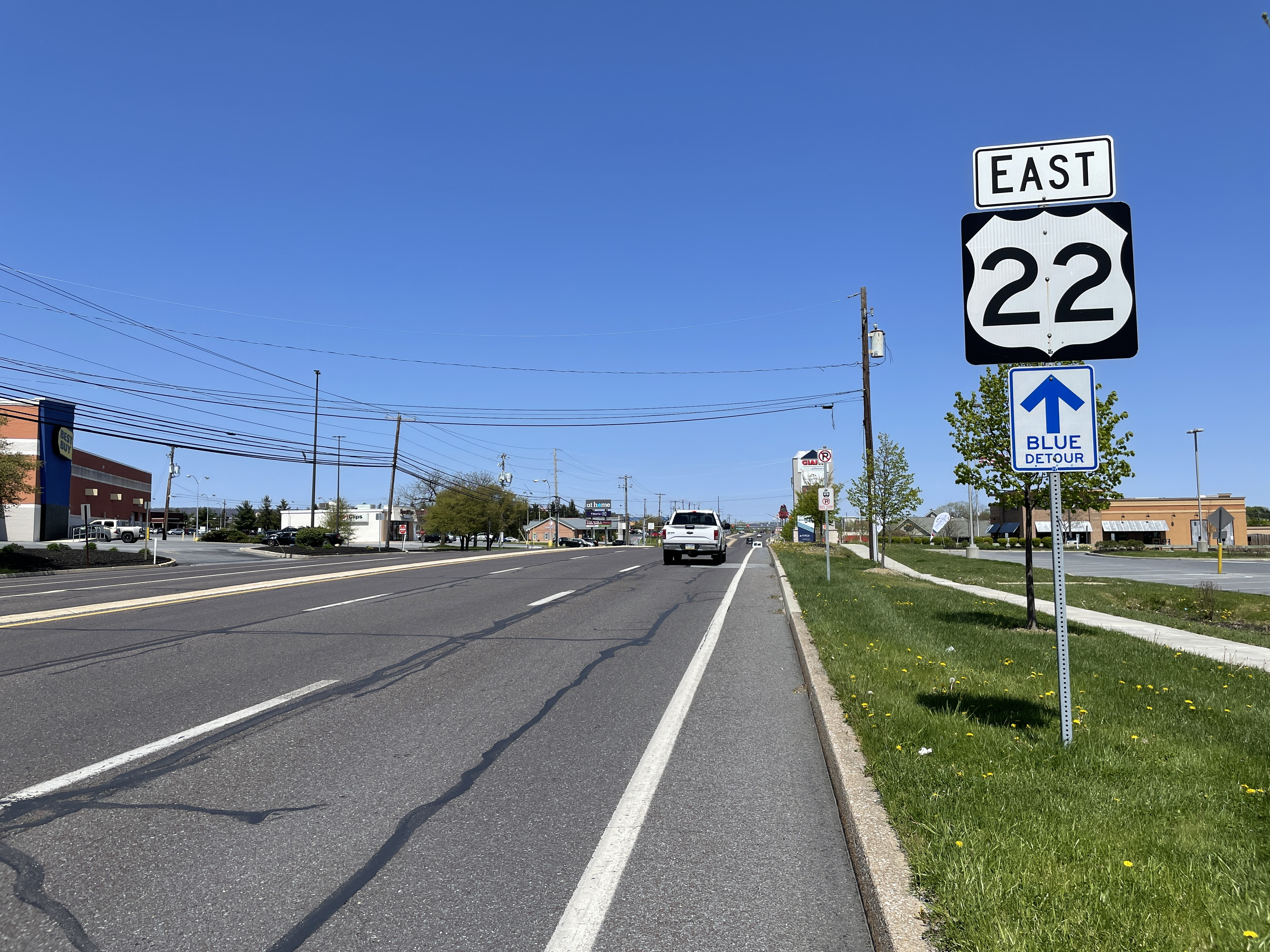
US 22 eastbound in Colonial Park east of Harrisburg

Past this interchange, US 22 continues south along the six-lane freeway along the eastern border of Harrisburg, passing to the east of the Harrisburg Area Community College campus. The freeway ends and the route becomes North Cameron Street, a four-lane divided highway with at-grade intersections that heads to the east of the Pennsylvania Farm Show Complex & Expo Center. US 22 turns southeast onto four-lane divided Arsenal Boulevard, with PA 230 continuing south (east) along North Cameron Street toward Downtown Harrisburg. The road winds southeast through developed areas as it skirts along the northeast border of Harrisburg, narrowing to a three-lane road with one eastbound lane and two westbound lanes before turning into a three-lane road with a center left-turn lane. US 22 turns east-northeast onto two-lane undivided Herr Street and leaves Harrisburg, continuing through suburban areas and entering the borough of Penbrook. Here, the route makes a turn northeast onto four-lane divided Walnut Street, leaving Penbrook and coming to an intersection with Progress Avenue. The road continues through suburban development in Progress, where it becomes a divided highway. The name of US 22 changes to Jonestown Road before it comes to a partial cloverleaf interchange with I-83/US 322. Following this interchange, the route heads into Colonial Park and runs through commercial areas, passing to the south of Colonial Park Mall. The road turns to the north-northeast and comes to Paxtonia, where it becomes Allentown Boulevard and reaches an intersection with Mountain Road, which provides access to I-81 a short distance to the north. From here, US 22 curves more to the east-northeast and continues through developed areas with some rural land and crossing Beaver Creek. Farther east, the route passes through Skyline View and comes to an intersection with PA 39. Past this intersection, the road heads northeast through rural areas with some development, crossing Manada Creek. Near Grantville, US 22 reaches a junction with the northern terminus of PA 743 and Bow Creek Road, which heads north to an interchange with I-81.

US 22 enters Lebanon County and continues northeast through agricultural areas of the Lebanon Valley along four-lane divided Allentown Boulevard. The route comes to a partial cloverleaf interchange with PA 934 north of Harper Tavern and curves to the east. The road continues through rural areas with some development, passing north of Ono and turning to the east-northeast. US 22 reaches a cloverleaf interchange with PA 72 and crosses the Swatara Creek before it becomes William Penn Highway and passes to the north of the borough of Jonestown, heading between rural land to the north and developed areas to the south. The route continues through agricultural land, passing to the south of Northern Lebanon High School before coming to an intersection with PA 343 south of Fredericksburg. At this point, PA 343 turns east to join US 22 in a concurrency, with the road passing near warehouses. PA 343 splits from US 22 to head north to a partial interchange with I-78 that provides access to westbound I-78 and from eastbound I-78. Following this, US 22 continues east-northeast through development and rural land a short distance to the south of I-78. Farther east, the route splits from William Penn Highway and merges onto I-78 at a partial interchange, with access from eastbound US 22 to eastbound I-78 and from westbound I-78 to westbound US 22. The two routes continue east-northeast along a four-lane freeway.

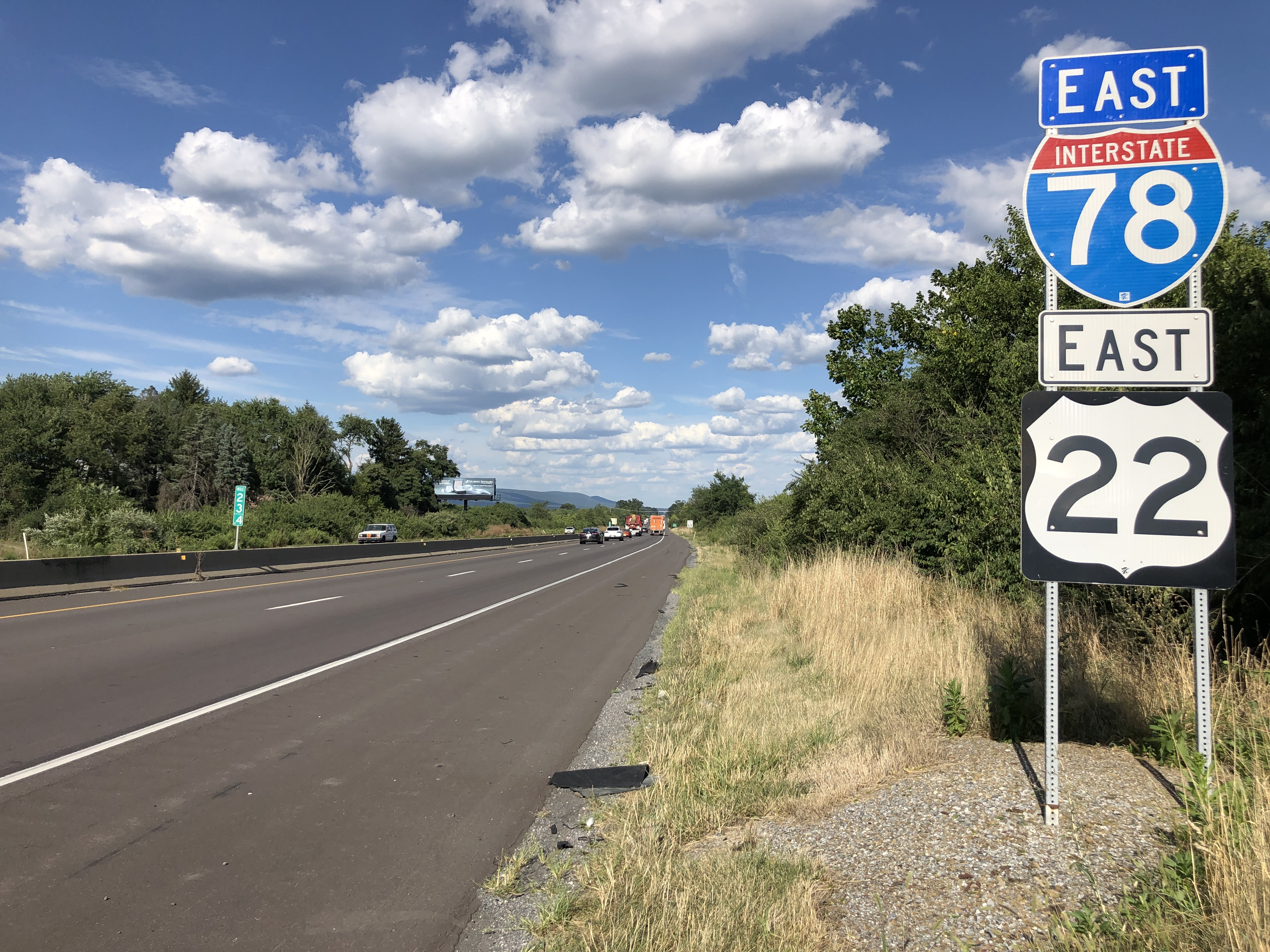
I-78/US 22 eastbound past the Shartlesville exit

I-78/US 22 enters Berks County and heads east-northeast through rural areas to the south of the Blue Mountain ridge, coming to a diamond interchange with PA 645 north of Frystown. The road continues near some warehouses and reaches a diamond interchange with PA 501 north of Bethel. The freeway passes to the south of Grimes Airport and coming to a right-in/right-out interchange with Court Street eastbound and Frantz Road westbound; this interchange has no access across the freeway. I-78/US 22 soon reaches a diamond interchange with Midway Road as it passes through more rural land, coming to a diamond interchange with PA 419 south of Schubert. Past this interchange, the road crosses the Little Swatara Creek. The freeway reaches a diamond interchange with PA 183 north of Strausstown. I-78/US 22 crosses Northkill Creek and comes to a diamond interchange with Mountain Road north of Shartlesville. At this point, I-78/US 22 becomes the CMSgt. Richard L. Etchberger Memorial Highway, in honor of Richard Etchberger. Following this interchange, the road heads northeast through more rural areas, reaching a partial cloverleaf interchange with PA 61 in a business area that includes a 250,000-square-foot (23,000 m^{2}) Cabela's store. Past PA 61, I-78/US 22 comes to a bridge over the Reading Blue Mountain and Northern Railroad's Reading Division line and the Schuylkill River. Upon crossing the river, I-78/US 22 enters the borough of Hamburg and passes through residential areas, coming to a diamond interchange at North 4th Street that serves Hamburg. The road leaves Hamburg and heads through rural areas, curving to the east. Farther east, the parallel Blue Mountain ridge heads further north from the freeway. I-78/US 22 comes to a partial cloverleaf interchange with PA 143 north of the borough of Lenhartsville. The CMSgt. Richard L. Etchberger Memorial Highway name for I-78/US 22 ends at this interchange. Past this interchange, the road crosses Maiden Creek. Farther east, the freeway reaches a diamond interchange with PA 737 south of Krumsville. The road continues east through rural land with some nearby development.

I-78/US 22 enters Lehigh County, where it becomes the Walter J. Dealtrey Memorial Highway and continues east into the Lehigh Valley, passing north of New Smithville. The road passes south of warehouses and comes to a diamond interchange with PA 863. Following this interchange, the freeway heads to the south of more warehouses and runs through more rural areas. I-78/US 22 runs between farm fields to the north and warehouses and industrial development to the south before it comes to a cloverleaf interchange with PA 100 in Fogelsville. After the PA 100 interchange, the freeway widens to six lanes and heads east through industrial areas, coming to a bridge over Norfolk Southern Railway's C&F Secondary railroad line before curving northeast. In Kuhnsville, US 22 splits from I-78 at an eastbound exit and westbound entrance by heading northeast on a four-lane freeway named the Lehigh Valley Thruway.

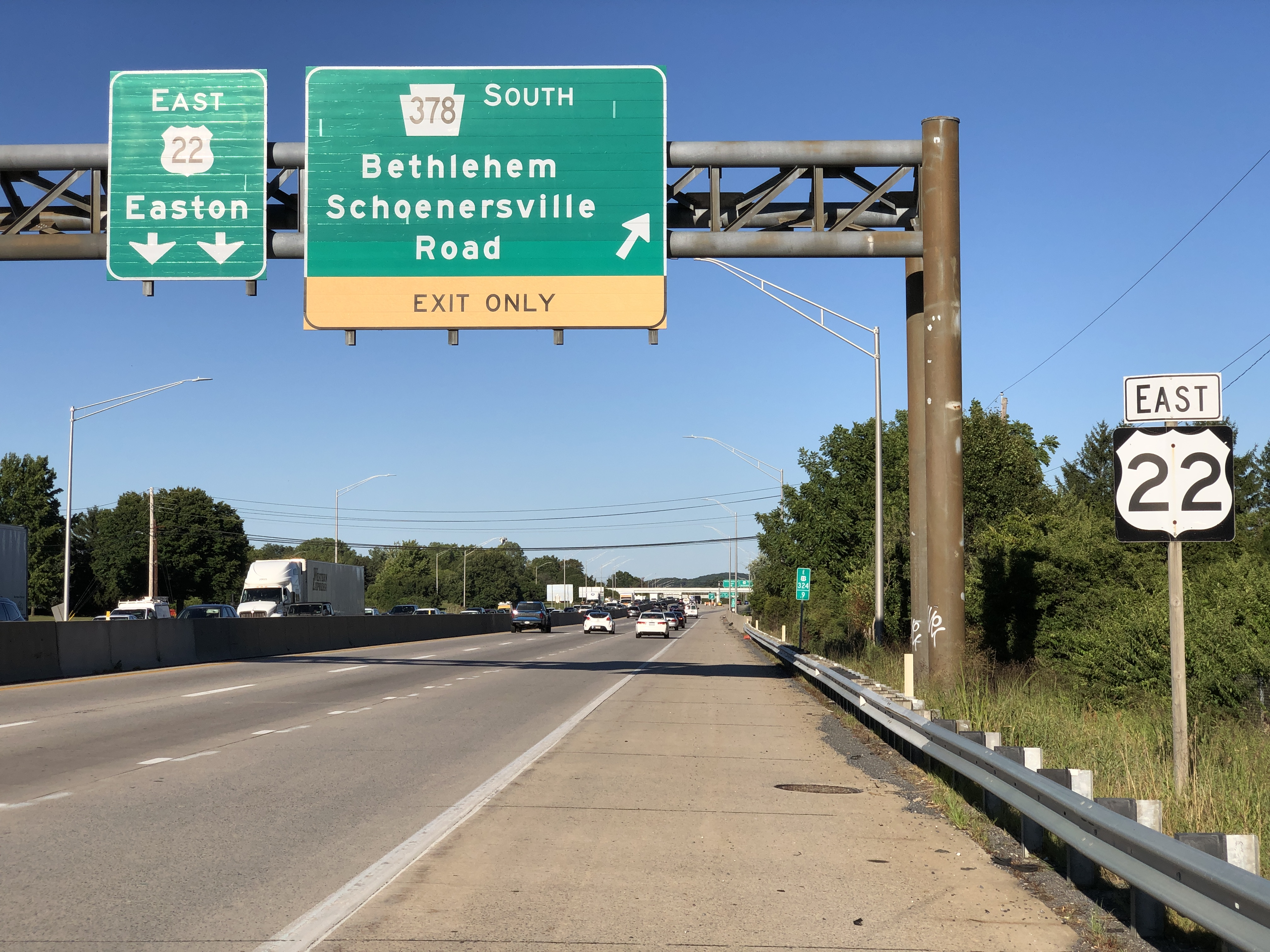
US 22 eastbound at the PA 378 interchange in Bethlehem

Upon splitting from I-78, US 22 runs east-northeast through developed areas and comes to a partial interchange with Tilghman Street that serves the communities of Cetronia and Kuhnsville. A short distance later, the freeway reaches the Lehigh Valley interchange with I-476 (Pennsylvania Turnpike Northeast Extension), which is a double trumpet interchange. US 22 continues past I-476 to a cloverleaf interchange with the PA 309 freeway. Past the PA 309 interchange, the route runs near suburban neighborhoods as it passes to the north of Allentown.

The freeway reaches a partial cloverleaf interchange with Cedar Crest Boulevard and continues east-northeast to another partial cloverleaf interchange at 15th Street. US 22 heads into Whitehall and passes over Jordan Creek before it reaches a partial cloverleaf interchange with PA 145 in a business area, with Lehigh Valley Mall located northeast of the interchange. The freeway runs past more suburban development and comes to a partial cloverleaf interchange with Fullerton Avenue in Fullerton. Past this interchange, the route passes over the Lehigh River and Norfolk Southern Railway's Lehigh Line on a bridge. US 22 continues east-northeast near development and reaches a cloverleaf interchange with the southern terminus of PA 987 at Airport Road that serves Lehigh Valley International Airport to the north. Following this interchange, the freeway enters Bethlehem and comes to a trumpet interchange with the northern terminus of the PA 378 freeway before reaching a partial cloverleaf interchange with Schoenersville Road.

At this interchange, US 22 leaves Bethlehem and enters Northampton County, running northeast through suburban development. The route reaches a partial cloverleaf interchange with the southern terminus of PA 512 and heads to the south of warehouses as it passes to the north of Bethlehem. The freeway passes over Norfolk Southern Railway's Cement Secondary railroad line and the Monocacy Creek before meeting the southern terminus of PA 191 at a partial cloverleaf interchange. Past this interchange, US 22 continues east through a mix of suburban development and farmland before it comes to a cloverleaf interchange with the PA 33 freeway. The freeway heads through developed areas and reaches a partial cloverleaf interchange with PA 248, where it turns northeast and runs along the northern border of the borough of Wilson. The route curves east and fully enters Wilson before it crosses into Easton and meets 13th Street at a partial cloverleaf interchange. After this interchange, US 22 winds east through a series of curves to the north of a cemetery, making a sharp turn to the southwest and crossing Bushkill Creek before it turns sharply to the east. The route becomes an elevated highway that passes through developed areas to the north of downtown Easton, coming to an eastbound exit and westbound entrance with 4th Street and a westbound exit and eastbound entrance with 3rd Street and Snyder Avenue. US 22 has a westbound exit and eastbound entrance with PA 611 before it crosses the Delaware River on the Easton–Phillipsburg Toll Bridge into New Jersey.

== History ==
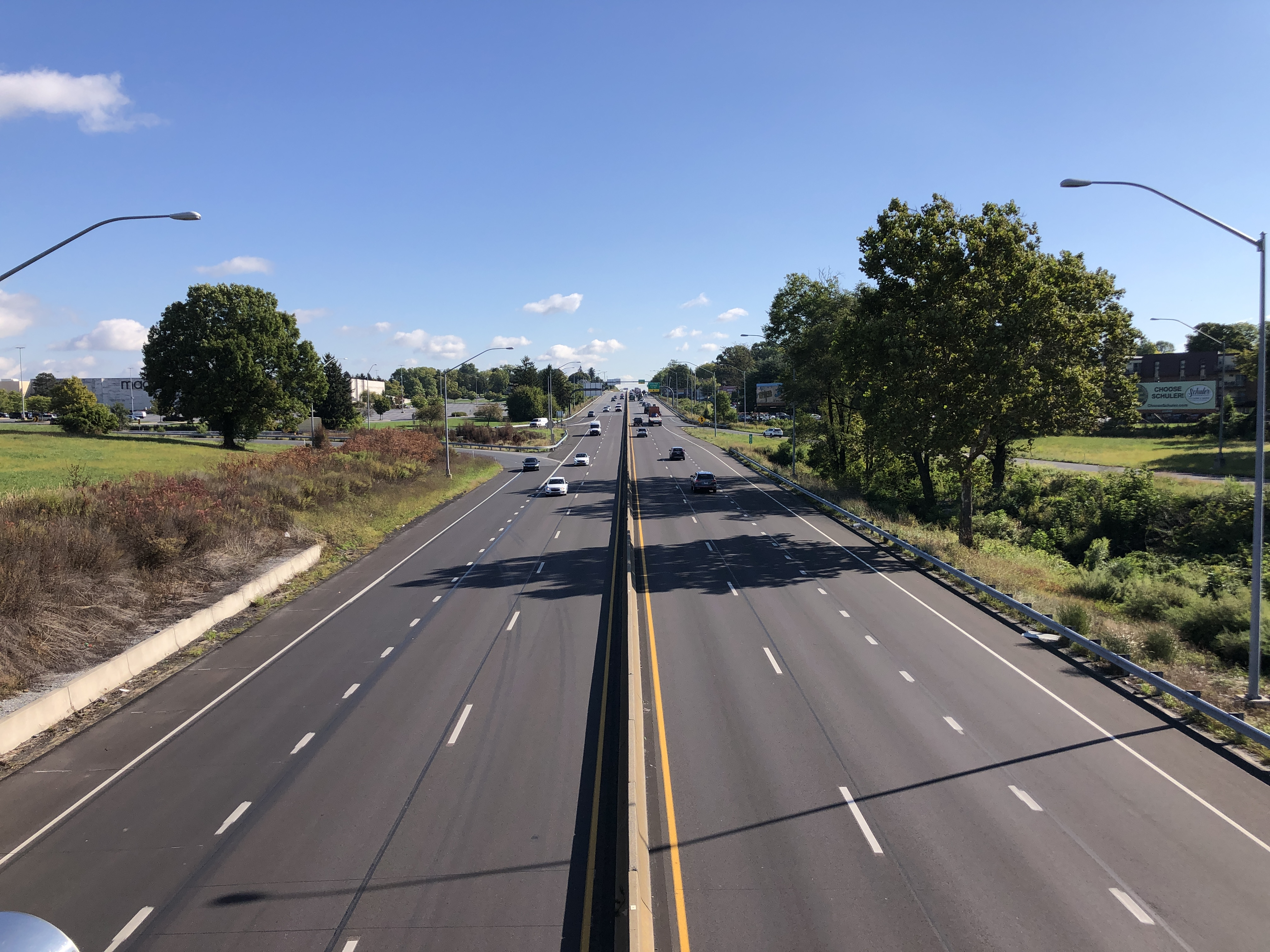
US 22 eastbound past the PA 145 interchange in Whitehall Township

The William Penn Highway was organized as an alternative to the Lincoln Highway being parallel to the Pennsylvania Railroad west of Harrisburg. The route's New York City extension was adopted in 1916. The Pennsylvania Department of Highways assigned the PA 3 designation to this road in 1924, and, in 1926, it became part of US 22 when the U.S. Numbered Highway System was formed.

=== East of Harrisburg ===
Pennsylvania Route 43
- Location: Harrisburg–Bethlehem
- Length: 87.41 mi (140.67 km)
- Existed: 1927–1946

The first alignment of the William Penn Highway became problematic for motorists in Lebanon along the current US 422; Reading via US 22 and US 222 and Allentown on Hamilton Street, present-day PA 222. The highway continued through Allentown on Hanover Avenue and through Bethlehem on Broad Street, Linden Street, and Easton Avenue.

PA 43 was aligned as a bypass, north of the Pennsylvania Dutch Country, that ran from US 22, US 11, and PA 5 in Harrisburg east to PA 12 in Bethlehem. From Harrisburg, this route followed modern-day US 22 to Paxtonia, then Jonestown Road to Jonestown and modern-day Old Route 22, Airport Road, and Main Street through Fredericksburg. East of here to Fogelsville, the route is variously called Old Route 22, Shartlesville Road, and Hex Highway. The route from Fogelsville to the Allentown line, now Main Street and Tilghman Street, was designated Legislative Route 443 in 1925 before being incorporated into this route. The route entered Harrisburg by Liberty Street and connected with the William Penn Highway through 17th Street. The New York Times was recommending use of this cutoff by early 1931. On June 8, 1931, the American Association of State Highway Officials came to a resolution for the traffic problem, by replacing the PA 43 corridor with US 22. The Pennsylvania Department of Highways moved the William Penn Highway name to match. The state deleted a concurrency with PA 43 and what was then US 309 and truncated PA 43 to Susquehanna Street and Broadway from Allentown to Bethlehem. Signs were changed to reflect the new designations on May 31, 1932, with the new route designations officially in place on June 1, 1932.

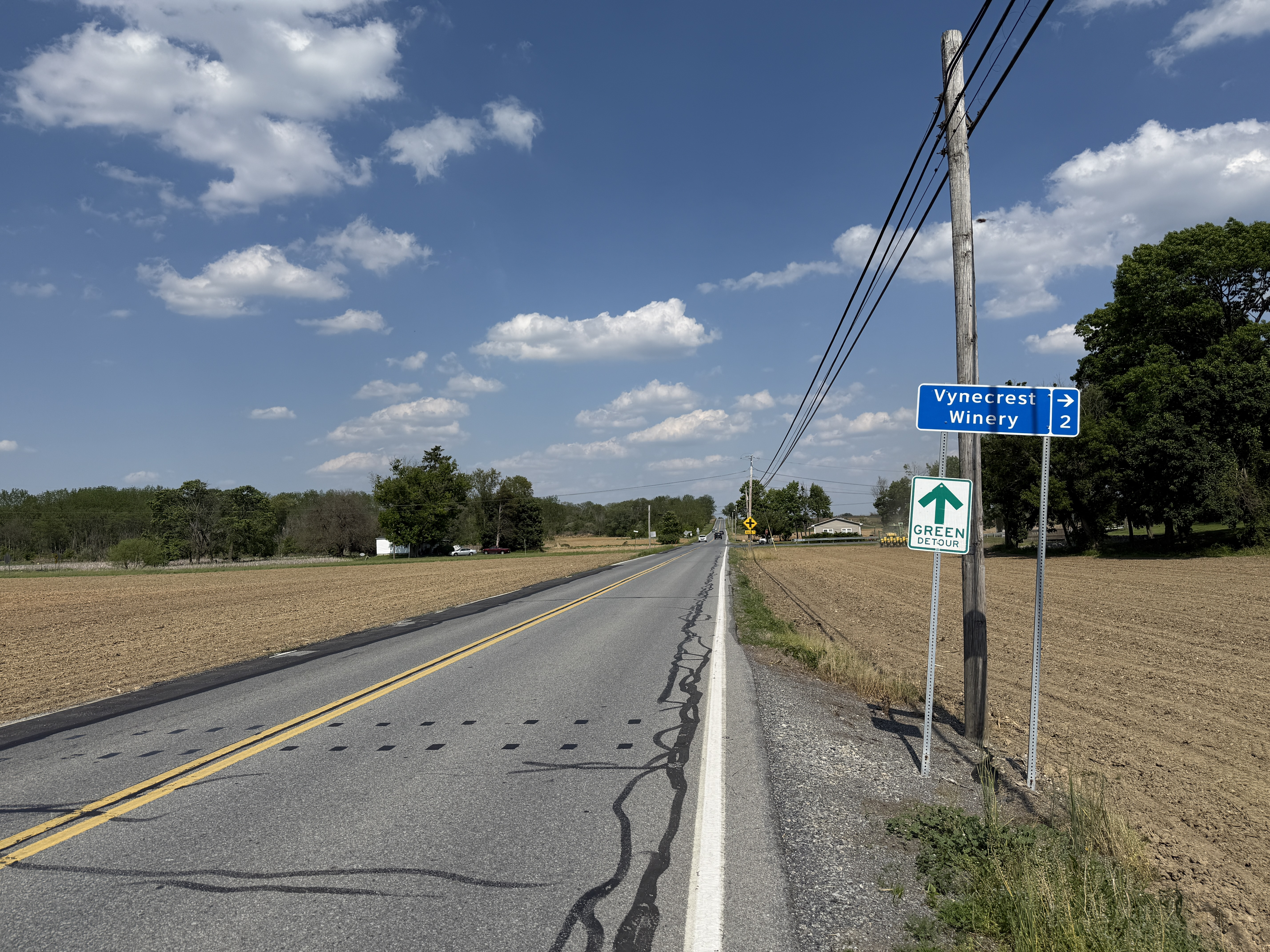
Old US 22 eastbound in Upper Macungie Township

Tilghman Street was eventually connected directly from Cetronia to Allentown by a bridge over Cedar Creek; Tilghman Street (west of the Lehigh River) and Union Boulevard (east of the river) were joined in 1929 by a bridge. By 1936, US 22 had been moved from its Hamilton and Broad streets alignment to Tilghman Street and Union Boulevard through Allentown and Bethlehem. From Bethlehem to Easton, an alternate route was formed along Goepp Street, Pembroke Road, and Freemansburg Avenue. With the construction of a new bridge over the Delaware River in 1938, Prospect Avenue, Pearl Street, and Snyder Street in Easton were incorporated into US 22. A new alignment from Fredericksburg to Paxtonia was built in the early 1940s. When the Lehigh Valley Thruway was completed in 1954, US 22 was moved onto it; its old alignment was redesignated State Route 1002 (SR 1002) through Lehigh County. With the completion of I-78, US 22 was moved onto that highway from Fredericksburg to Kuhnsville. The former alignment, although no longer a major state highway, is still well traveled by those who live in the vicinity.

I-78 originally would have continued with the US 22 concurrency on the Lehigh Valley Thruway into New Jersey, and I-178 and I-378, serving Allentown and Bethlehem, respectively. Due to opposition in Phillipsburg, New Jersey, on the building of a new highway through the town, the Pennsylvania and New Jersey departments of transportation decided to reroute I-78 to the south and allow US 22 to remain on the limited-access highway, which, after going through a series of sharp, potentially dangerous curves in Easton and crossing the Delaware River into New Jersey, becomes an at-grade divided highway in Phillipsburg.

=== West of Harrisburg ===
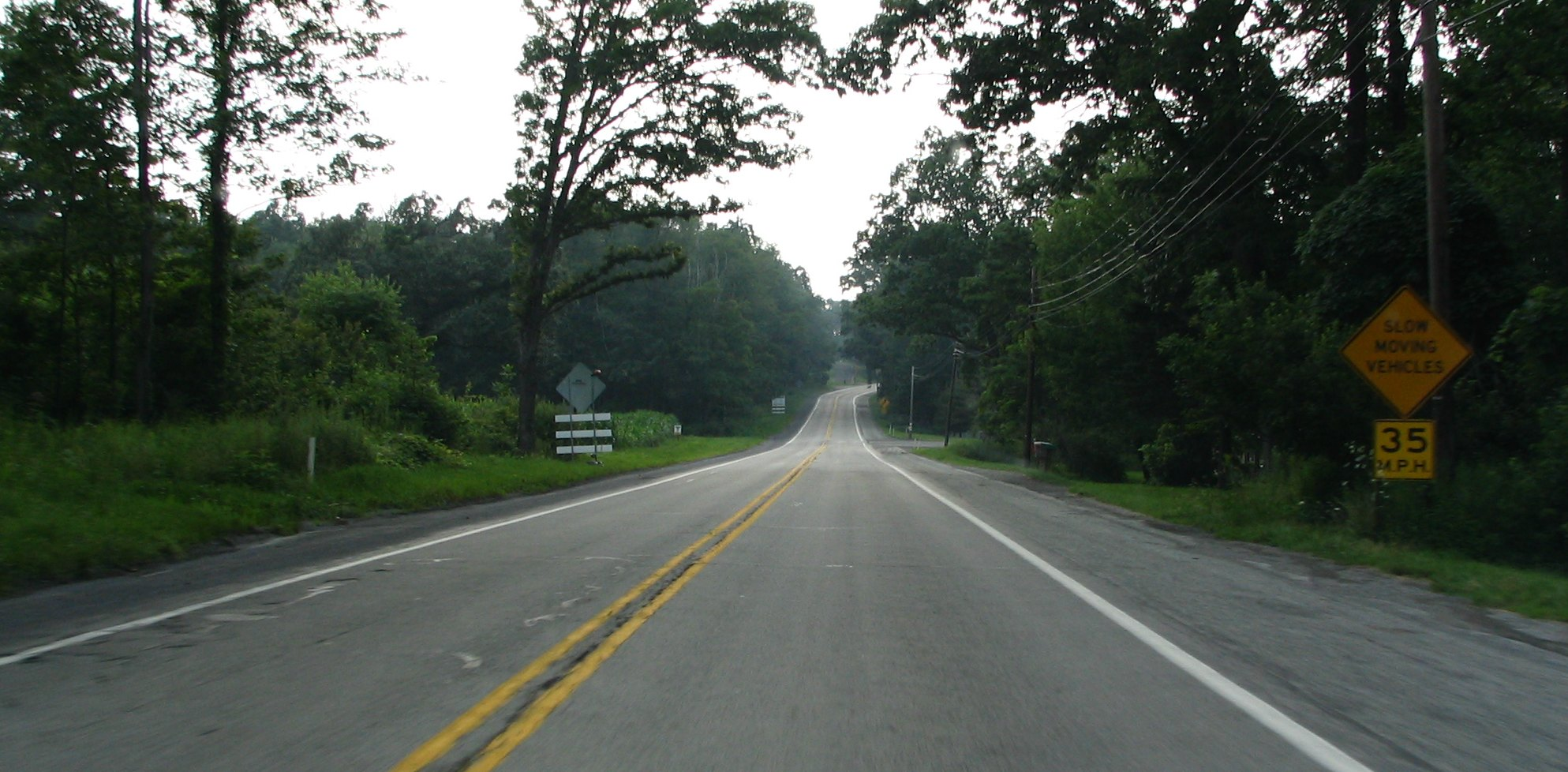
Two-lane section of US 22 west of Nanty Glo in 2006; the widening of this section to four lanes was completed in 2011.

The origins of this section of US 22 date back to the early 1800s, with the chartering of the Harrisburg, Lewistown, Huntingdon, and Pittsburgh Turnpike in 1807, following the course of what would become US 22 from Harrisburg to Pittsburgh, providing a more northerly alternative to the Harrisburg and Pittsburgh Turnpike chartered the year prior. Support for the turnpike was lacking along its route, and so, to foster a sense of locality to the road, the company was broken up in the subsequent years into five sections: the Huntingdon, Cambria, and Indiana in 1810 (terminating at Huntingdon and Blairsville); the New Alexandria and Conemaugh in 1816 (Blairsville to New Alexandria); the Pittsburgh and New Alexandria Turnpike in 1816; and the Harrisburg and Millerstown, Millerstown and Lewistown, and Lewistown and Huntingdon turnpikes in 1821. In their own times, these companies constructed a highway across the Appalachian Mountains collectively called the Northern Pike, but all folded with competition from the Main Line of Public Works and, later, the Pennsylvania Railroad.

In its earliest years, US 22 deviated from the original course of the William Penn Highway in a few notable places. With the construction of the Boulevard of the Allies in the early 1920s, the highway was rerouted to service this thoroughfare. This alignment entered Pittsburgh on modern day PA 8, then made its way downtown by Dallas Avenue, Wilkins Avenue, Beeler Street, Forbes Street, the Boulevard of the Allies, and Second Street. The highway then followed the old Pittsburgh and Steubenville Pike to Ohio. With the construction of the Penn-Lincoln Parkway in the late 1950s, both US 22 and US 30 were shifted to the new highway.

Further east, where the William Penn Highway deviated from the Northern Pike between Ebensburg and Water Street to service Altoona and Tyrone, the Northern Pike was restored as the main east–west thoroughfare, while US 220 was chosen to service these cities. A few notable deviations from this include Turkey Valley Road near Canoe Creek Lake, and a bend servicing Williamsburg via modern-day PA 866 and SR 2015, which both deviated from the Northern Pike. These were later christened as PA 303 and PA 203 respectively when the highway was restored to the Northern Pike. Near the Susquehanna River, before an alignment along the Juniata River had been constructed, the highway serviced New Bloomfield and Meck's Corner by modern-day PA 34 and PA 274; while US 22 was shifted north, this alignment still held its old designation of PA 3 for some time afterward.

== Future ==
In 2011, it was announced that plans were being resurrected to widen US 22 from Allentown to Bethlehem. Part of the plan is to reconstruct the Lehigh River Bridge. The plan's cost is between $240 million to $320 million.

PennDOT eventually intends to have the segment of US 22 between the Interstate 78 and PA 33 interchanges resigned as an interstate highway. As of June 2026, it has twice attempted to submit a request to the American Association of State Highway and Transportation Officials (AASHTO), without success. AASHTO has cited "deficiencies of geometrics" as reasoning for its denial. No number has yet been proposed.

== Major intersections ==
County	Location	mi	km	Exit	Destinations	Notes
Washington	Hanover Township	0.00	0.00		US 22 west – Weirton	Continuation into West Virginia
Washington	Hanover Township	5.3	8.5		PA 18 – Florence, Burgettstown	Access to Raccoon Creek State Park and The Pavilion at Star Lake
Washington	Robinson Township	9.7	15.6		Bavington	Access via Maple Grove Road
Washington	Robinson Township	11.4	18.3		PA Turnpike 576 to I-79 – Pittsburgh International Airport, Washington	PA 576 exit 6
Allegheny	North Fayette Township	12.8	20.6		PA 980 south – McDonald, Midway	Northern terminus of PA 980
Allegheny	North Fayette Township	14.4	23.2		Noblestown	Access via Kelso Road; access to Pennsylvania Motor Speedway
Allegheny	North Fayette Township	16.0	25.7		US 30 west / PA 978 south – Imperial	Western terminus of US 30 concurrency; northern terminus of PA 978; access to Raccoon Creek State Park
Allegheny	North Fayette Township	17.4	28.0		Hankey Farms	Access via Oakdale Road
Allegheny	North Fayette Township	18.4	29.6		Orange Belt (Oakdale)	Westbound exit and eastbound entrance; western terminus of Orange Belt concurrency
Allegheny	North Fayette Township	19.5	31.4		Montour Church Road / Old Steubenville Pike / Bayer Road	Westbound exit and eastbound entrance
Allegheny	Robinson Township	19.9– 20.4	32.0– 32.8	60	I-376 west / Orange Belt / PA 60 south – Airport, Crafton	Signed as exits 60A (west) and 60B (south); eastern terminus of Orange Belt concurrency; western terminus of I-376 concurrency; exit number not signed eastbound
Allegheny	Robinson Township	20.7	33.3	61	Ridge Road	
Allegheny	Robinson–Collier township line	21.9	35.2	62	Yellow Belt (Campbells Run Road)	Westbound exit and eastbound entrance
Allegheny	Robinson Township	23.5	37.8	64A	I-79 – Washington, Erie	I-79 exit 59
Allegheny	Rosslyn Farms	24.3	39.1	64B	Rosslyn Farms	Westbound exit and eastbound entrance; access via Rosslyn Road
Allegheny	Carnegie	24.8	39.9		Buses only (West Busway)	Eastbound exit and westbound entrance
Allegheny	Carnegie	25.2	40.6	65	PA 50 – Carnegie, Heidelberg	
Allegheny	Green Tree	27.0	43.5	67	PA 121 – Green Tree, Mount Lebanon, Crafton	
Allegheny	Pittsburgh	27.6	44.4	68	Parkway Center Drive	Westbound exit and eastbound entrance
Allegheny	Pittsburgh	28.2	45.4	69A	US 19 south (Banksville Road)	Western terminus of US 19/US 19 Truck concurrency; eastbound exit is via exit 69C
Allegheny	Pittsburgh	28.7	46.2	69B	US 19 Truck south / PA 51 south – Uniontown	Westbound exit is via exit 69A
Allegheny	Pittsburgh	28.7	46.2	69C	US 19 north / PA 51 north – West End	Eastern terminus of US 19 concurrency; eastbound exit and westbound entrance
Allegheny	Pittsburgh	29.1	46.8	Fort Pitt Tunnel under Mount Washington		
Allegheny	Pittsburgh	29.6	47.6	69C	PA 837 to PA 51 – West End	Westbound exit and eastbound entrance
Allegheny	Monongahela River	29.7	47.8	Fort Pitt Bridge		
Allegheny	Pittsburgh	29.7	47.8	70A	Boulevard of the Allies / Liberty Avenue – PPG Arena	Eastbound exit and westbound entrance
Allegheny	Pittsburgh	29.7	47.8	70B	Fort Duquesne Boulevard – Convention Center, Strip District	Eastbound exit and westbound entrance
Allegheny	Pittsburgh	29.7	47.8	70C	I-279 north (US 19 Truck north) – Fort Duquesne Bridge, North Shore	Eastern terminus of US 19 Truck concurrency
Allegheny	Pittsburgh	30.0	48.3	70D	Stanwix Street	No eastbound exit
Allegheny	Pittsburgh	30.4	48.9	71A	Grant Street	
Allegheny	Pittsburgh	30.9	49.7	71B	Second Avenue	Westbound exit only
Allegheny	Pittsburgh	31.8	51.2	72A	Forbes Avenue – Oakland	Eastbound exit and westbound entrance
Allegheny	Pittsburgh	32.1	51.7	72B	Boulevard of the Allies (PA 885 north) to I-579 north – Liberty Bridge	No eastbound exit; eastbound left entrance
Allegheny	Pittsburgh	32.6	52.5	73	PA 885 (Bates Street) – Oakland, Glenwood	Westbound exit and eastbound entrance; signed as exits 73A (south) and 73B (north)
Allegheny	Pittsburgh	34.2	55.0	74	Blue Belt – Squirrel Hill, Homestead	
Allegheny	Pittsburgh	34.8	56.0	Squirrel Hill Tunnel under Squirrel Hill		
Allegheny	Pittsburgh–Swissvale– Edgewood tripoint	36.4	58.6	77	Edgewood, Swissvale	Access via Braddock Avenue
Allegheny	Wilkinsburg	37.7	60.7	78A	US 30 east – Forest Hills	Eastern terminus of US 30 concurrency; no westbound exit
Allegheny	Wilkinsburg	37.9	61.0	78B	PA 8 north – Wilkinsburg	Southern terminus of PA 8
Allegheny	Churchill	38.6	62.1	79A	Greensburg Pike	Eastbound exit and westbound entrance
Allegheny	Churchill	39.1	62.9	79B	PA 130 – Churchill	
Allegheny	Churchill	39.9	64.2	80	US 22 Bus. east – Monroeville	Eastbound exit and westbound entrance
Allegheny	Churchill	40.2	64.7	81	PA 791 north / Yellow Belt – Penn Hills	
Allegheny	Monroeville	43.8– 44.0	70.5– 70.8	84	US 22 Bus. west / PA 48 south / Orange Belt – Monroeville, Plum	Eastbound exit and westbound entrance; signed as exits 84A (south) and 84B (north); US 22 Bus. not signed
Allegheny	Monroeville	44.5	71.6	85	I-76 Toll / Penna Turnpike / US 22 Bus. west – Monroeville, Ohio, Harrisburg I-376 ends	Eastern terminus of I-376; exit number not signed westbound; no eastbound access to US 22 Bus.
Allegheny	Monroeville	44.5	71.6	Eastern end of freeway section		
Allegheny	Monroeville	46.4	74.7		PA 286 east (Golden Mile Highway)	Eastbound exit and westbound entrance, westbound exit and eastbound entrance provided by at-grade intersection; western terminus of PA 286
Westmoreland	Salem Township	54.8	88.2		PA 66 to PA Turnpike 66 south – Delmont, Greensburg	Single-point urban interchange
Westmoreland	Salem Township	57.4	92.4		PA 819 – Slickville, Forbes Road, Greensburg	
Westmoreland	Salem Township	61.8	99.5		US 119 south – Greensburg	Western terminus of US 119 concurrency
Westmoreland	New Alexandria–Derry Township line	62.8	101.1		PA 981 (Latrobe New Alexandria Road) – Latrobe, Saltsburg	
Westmoreland	Derry Township	67.3	108.3		PA 982 south – Derry	Northern terminus of PA 982
Indiana	Blairsville	71.5	115.1		PA 217 – Blairsville, Derry	Interchange
Indiana	Burrell Township	74.2	119.4		US 119 north – Homer City, Indiana	Interchange; eastern terminus of US 119 concurrency; access to Indiana University of Pennsylvania
Indiana	West Wheatfield Township	80.3	129.2		PA 259 – Brush Valley, Robinson, Bolivar	Interchange
Indiana	East Wheatfield Township			Western end of freeway section		
Indiana	East Wheatfield Township	84.4	135.8		PA 56 – Brush Valley, Armagh	Access to Johnstown
Indiana	East Wheatfield Township				East Philadelphia Street	Eastbound exit and entrance
Indiana	East Wheatfield Township	85.6	137.8		PA 403 – Dilltown, Johnstown	
Indiana	East Wheatfield Township			Eastern end of freeway section		
Cambria	Jackson Township				Dishong Mountain Road	Interchange
Cambria	Jackson Township	95.2	153.2		PA 271 – Mundys Corner, Nanty Glo	Interchange
Cambria	Cambria Township	99.5	160.1		US 219 to US 422 – Johnstown, Carrolltown, Indiana	Interchange
Cambria	Cambria Township	100.9	162.4		Ebensburg	Interchange; no westbound exit; access via High Street
Cambria	Cambria Township	102.8	165.4	Western end of freeway section		
Cambria	Cambria Township	102.8	165.4		Ebensburg, Loretto	Access via Rowena Drive/Admiral Peary Highway
Cambria	Munster Township	105.9	170.4		PA 164 south – Munster, Portage	Northern terminus of PA 164
Cambria	Cresson Township	109.0	175.4		PA 53 – Cresson, Lilly, Portage	Cresson signed eastbound; Portage signed westbound; access to Mount Aloysius College and Prince Gallitzin State Park
Cambria	Cresson Township	111.1	178.8		Cresson, Summit	Access via Admiral Peary Highway; Cresson signed westbound; access to Mount Aloysius College and Prince Gallitzin State Park
Cambria–Blair county line	Cresson–Allegheny township line	112.8	181.5		Gallitzin	Access via Tunnelhill Road; access to Allegheny Portage Railroad National Historic Site
Blair	Allegheny Township	119.2	191.8		I-99 / US 220 – Altoona, Bedford	I-99/US 220 exit 28
Blair	Allegheny Township	120.2	193.4		PA 764 north – Altoona	Southern terminus of PA 764
Blair	Allegheny Township	120.2	193.4	Eastern end of freeway section		
Blair	Allegheny Township	121.8	196.0		US 220 Bus. south (Old US 220) to I-99 south / US 220 south – Newry, Bedford	Western terminus of US 220 Bus. concurrency
Blair	Blair Township				US 220 Bus. north (Plank Road) to I-99 / US 220 – Altoona	Eastern terminus of US 220 Bus. concurrency
Blair	Hollidaysburg	124.6	200.5		PA 36 (Penn Street) – Altoona, Roaring Spring	
Blair	Frankstown Township	136.3	219.4		PA 866 south (Juniata River Road) – Williamsburg	Northern terminus of PA 866
Huntingdon	Morris Township	142.0	228.5		PA 453 north (Birmingham Pike) to PA 45 – Tyrone, State College	Southern terminus of PA 453
Huntingdon	Porter Township	144.6	232.7		PA 305 east (Bridge Street) – Alexandria	Western terminus of PA 305
Huntingdon	Smithfield Township	150.2	241.7		PA 26 – Everett, Huntingdon, State College	Interchange
Huntingdon	Smithfield Township				Fairgrounds Road	Interchange
Huntingdon	Henderson Township				To PA 26 north – Huntingdon, State College	Interchange; access via Penn Street
Huntingdon	Henderson Township	156.4	251.7		PA 829 south – Cassville	Northern terminus of PA 829
Huntingdon	Mill Creek	157.2	253.0		PA 655 north – Belleville	Western terminus of PA 655 concurrency
Huntingdon	Brady Township	158.6	255.2		PA 655 south (Oriskany Road) – Mapleton, Saltillo	Eastern terminus of PA 655 concurrency
Mifflin	Wayne Township	163.1	262.5		PA 747 south (North Jefferson Street) – Mount Union	Northern terminus of PA 747
Mifflin	Wayne Township	163.5	263.1		US 522 south (Croghan Pike) – Orbisonia	Western terminus of US 522 concuurency
Mifflin	Granville Township	182.2	293.2	Western end of freeway section		
Mifflin	Granville Township	182.2	293.2		US 22 Bus. east	Western terminus of US 22 Bus.
Mifflin	Derry Township	186.2	299.7		US 322 west – State College	Western terminus of US 322 concurrency
Mifflin	Derry Township	186.4	300.0		Electric Avenue	
Mifflin	Lewistown	187.0	300.9		US 522 north (Walnut Street) – Selinsgrove	Eastern terminus of US 522 concurrency
Mifflin	Derry Township	187.4	301.6		East Charles Street	Eastbound exit and westbound entrance
Mifflin	Derry Township	189.3	304.6		US 22 Bus. west – Lewistown	Westbound exit and eastbound entrance; eastern terminus of US 22 Bus.
Juniata	Fermanagh Township				Fishing/Boating Access Area	Eastbound exit and entrance
Juniata	Fermanagh Township	196.9	316.9		Arch Rock Road	Access to Mifflintown Airport
Juniata	Fermanagh Township	200.1	322.0		PA 35 – McAlisterville, Mifflintown	
Juniata	Walker Township	202.0	325.1		PA 75 south – Port Royal	Northern terminus of PA 75
Juniata	Delaware Township–Thompsontown line	209.6	337.3		PA 333 – East Salem, Thompsontown	
Juniata	Delaware Township	211.2	339.9		Pfoutz Valley Road	Westbound exit and eastbound entrance
Perry	Greenwood Township	215.0	346.0		To PA 17 – Millerstown	Access via West Juniata Parkway
Perry	Howe Township	219.5	353.3		PA 34 – Newport, New Bloomfield	Access to Little Buffalo State Park
Perry	Buffalo Township	223.3	359.4		Midway	Westbound exit and eastbound entrance; access via Meadow Grove Road
Perry	Watts Township	225.9	363.6		Watts	Left exit eastbound; right exit westbound; access via Huggins Road
Perry	Watts Township	227.8	366.6		Amity Hall	Westbound exit and entrance; access via River Road
Dauphin	Reed Township	228.0	366.9		US 11 / US 15 – Camp Hill, Selinsgrove, Williamsport	Williamsport signed westbound
Dauphin	Reed Township			Eastern end of freeway section		
Dauphin	Reed Township	229.4	369.2		PA 849 west – Duncannon	Eastern terminus of PA 849; no access from PA 849 to US 22/US 322 westbound
Dauphin	Reed Township			Western end of freeway section		
Dauphin	Susquehanna River			Clarks Ferry Bridge		
Dauphin	Reed Township	229.8	369.8		PA 147 north – Halifax	Southern terminus of PA 147
Dauphin	Middle Paxton Township	231.8	373.0		PA 325 east (Mountain Road)	Western terminus of PA 325
Dauphin	Middle Paxton Township	235.2	378.5		PA 225 north – Halifax, Dauphin	Dauphin signed eastbound; southern terminus of PA 225
Dauphin	Dauphin	236.2	380.1		Dauphin Boro, Stony Creek	Westbound exit; access via Allegheny Street
Dauphin	Middle Paxton Township	237.6	382.4		PA 443 – Fishing Creek, Rockville	Rockville signed eastbound
Dauphin	Susquehanna Township–Harrisburg line	239.5	385.4		PA 39 – Linglestown, Rockville	Rockville signed westbound
Dauphin	Harrisburg	241.5	388.7		I-81 / US 322 east (Capital Beltway) to I-78 east / I-83 – Carlisle, Hershey, Hazleton, Allentown	I-81 exit 67; eastern terminus of US 322 concurrency; signed for I-83/Hershey eastbound, I-78/Hazleton westbound
Dauphin	Harrisburg			Eastern end of freeway section		
Dauphin	Harrisburg				PA 230 east (Cameron Street)	Western terminus of PA 230
Dauphin	Lower Paxton Township				I-83 / US 322 (Capital Beltway) to I-81 – Carlisle, Hazleton, Hershey, York	I-83 exit 50
Dauphin	West Hanover Township				PA 39 (Hershey Road) to I-81 – Hershey	
Dauphin	East Hanover Township				PA 743 south (Laudermilch Road) to I-81 – Grantville, Hershey	Northern terminus of PA 743
Lebanon	East Hanover Township				PA 934 to I-81 – Annville, Fort Indiantown Gap	Interchange
Lebanon	Union Township				PA 72 to I-81 – Lebanon, Lickdale	
Lebanon	Bethel Township				PA 343 south (Pine Grove Street) – Lebanon	Western terminus of PA 343 concurrency
Lebanon	Bethel Township				PA 343 north (Pine Grove Road) to I-78 west	Eastern terminus of PA 343 concurrency
Lebanon	Bethel Township				Local Traffic	Old US 22 to Mount Zion Road
Lebanon	Bethel Township			Western end of freeway section		
Lebanon	Bethel Township			8	I-78 west – Harrisburg	Westbound exit and eastbound entrance; western terminus of I-78 concurrency
Berks	Bethel Township			10	PA 645 – Frystown	
Berks	Bethel Township			13	PA 501 – Bethel	
Berks	Bethel Township			15	Grimes	Right-in/right-out connections only; access via Court Street/Frantz Road; no tractor trailers
Berks	Bethel Township			16	Midway	Access via Midway Road
Berks	Bethel Township			17	PA 419 – Rehrersburg	Access to Conrad Weiser Homestead
Berks	Upper Tulpehocken Township			19	PA 183 – Strausstown	
Berks	Upper Bern Township			23	Shartlesville	Access via Mountain Road
Berks	Tilden Township			29	PA 61 – Pottsville, Reading	
Berks	Hamburg			30	Hamburg	Access via North 4th Street
Berks	Greenwich Township			35	PA 143 – Lenhartsville	
Berks	Greenwich Township			40	PA 737 – Kutztown, Krumsville	Access to Kutztown University of Pennsylvania
Lehigh	Weisenberg Township			45	PA 863 – Lynnport, New Smithville	
Lehigh	Upper Macungie Township			49	PA 100 – Trexlertown, Fogelsville	Signed as exits 49A (south) and 49B (north)
Lehigh	Upper Macungie Township			51	I-78 east – New Jersey	Eastbound exit and westbound entrance; eastern terminus of I-78 concurrency
Lehigh	Upper Macungie Township	315.7	508.1		Cetronia, Kuhnsville	Access via SR 1002; signed for Cetronia eastbound, Kuhnsville westbound
Lehigh	South Whitehall Township	316.1	508.7		I-476 Toll / Penna Turnpike NE Extension – Philadelphia, Scranton	I-476 / Penna Turnpike NE Extension exit 56 (Allentown); former PA 9
Lehigh	South Whitehall Township	316.7	509.7		PA 309 – Quakertown, Tamaqua	To I-78 east; access to Dorney Park, and Lehigh Carbon Community College
Lehigh	South Whitehall Township	318.7	512.9		Cedar Crest Boulevard (SR 1019)	Access to Muhlenberg College and Cedar Crest College
Lehigh	South Whitehall Township	320.3	515.5		15th Street	Access via Mauch Chunk Road
Lehigh	Whitehall Township	321.0	516.6		PA 145 (MacArthur Road / 7th Street)	Access to Allentown Center City
Lehigh	Whitehall Township	322.1	518.4		Fullerton Avenue	
Lehigh	Hanover Township–Bethlehem line	324.0	521.4		Airport Road south	
Lehigh	Hanover Township–Bethlehem line	324.0	521.4		PA 987 north (Airport Road) – Lehigh Valley International Airport	Southern terminus of PA 987
Lehigh	Bethlehem	325.1	523.2		PA 378 south – Bethlehem	Northern terminus of PA 378; former I-378
Northampton	Bethlehem	325.6	524.0		Schoenersville Road	
Northampton	Hanover Township	327.4	526.9		PA 512 north (Center Street)	Southern terminus of PA 512; access to Moravian University
Northampton	Bethlehem Township	329.9	530.9		PA 191 north (Nazareth Pike)	Southern terminus of PA 191
Northampton	Bethlehem Township	332.3	534.8		PA 33 to I-78 / I-80 – Stroudsburg	I-80 not signed eastbound; access to the Pocono Mountains
Northampton	Palmer Township	334.5	538.3		PA 248 / 25th Street – Wilson	Access to Palmer
Northampton	Easton	336.0	540.7		13th Street	Access via Wood Avenue
Northampton	Easton	337.5	543.2		PA 248 / 4th Street to PA 611	Eastbound exit and westbound entrance
Northampton	Easton	337.8	543.6		Snyder Street – Easton, Lafayette College	Westbound exit only
Northampton	Easton	337.9	543.8		PA 248 west / PA 611 – Easton	Westbound exit and eastbound entrance; PA 248 not signed
Delaware River		338.20	544.28	Easton–Phillipsburg Toll Bridge (westbound toll in New Jersey)		
Delaware River		338.20	544.28		US 22 east to I-78 – Phillipsburg	Continuation into New Jersey
1.000 mi = 1.609 km; 1.000 km = 0.621 mi: Concurrency terminus; Electronic toll collection; Incomplete access

== See also ==
- Special routes of U.S. Route 22

U.S. Route 22
Previous state: West Virginia	Pennsylvania	Next state: New Jersey
