= Sylvan Hills Middle School =

Sylvan Hills Middle School may refer to:

- Sylvan Hills Middle School (Sherwood, Arkansas, USA)
- Sylvan Hills Middle School (Atlanta, Georgia, USA)
