= Frankstown Township, Blair County, Pennsylvania =

Township in Pennsylvania, US

Coordinates: 40°27′30″N 78°22′59″W

Frankstown Township, Pennsylvania
- Township
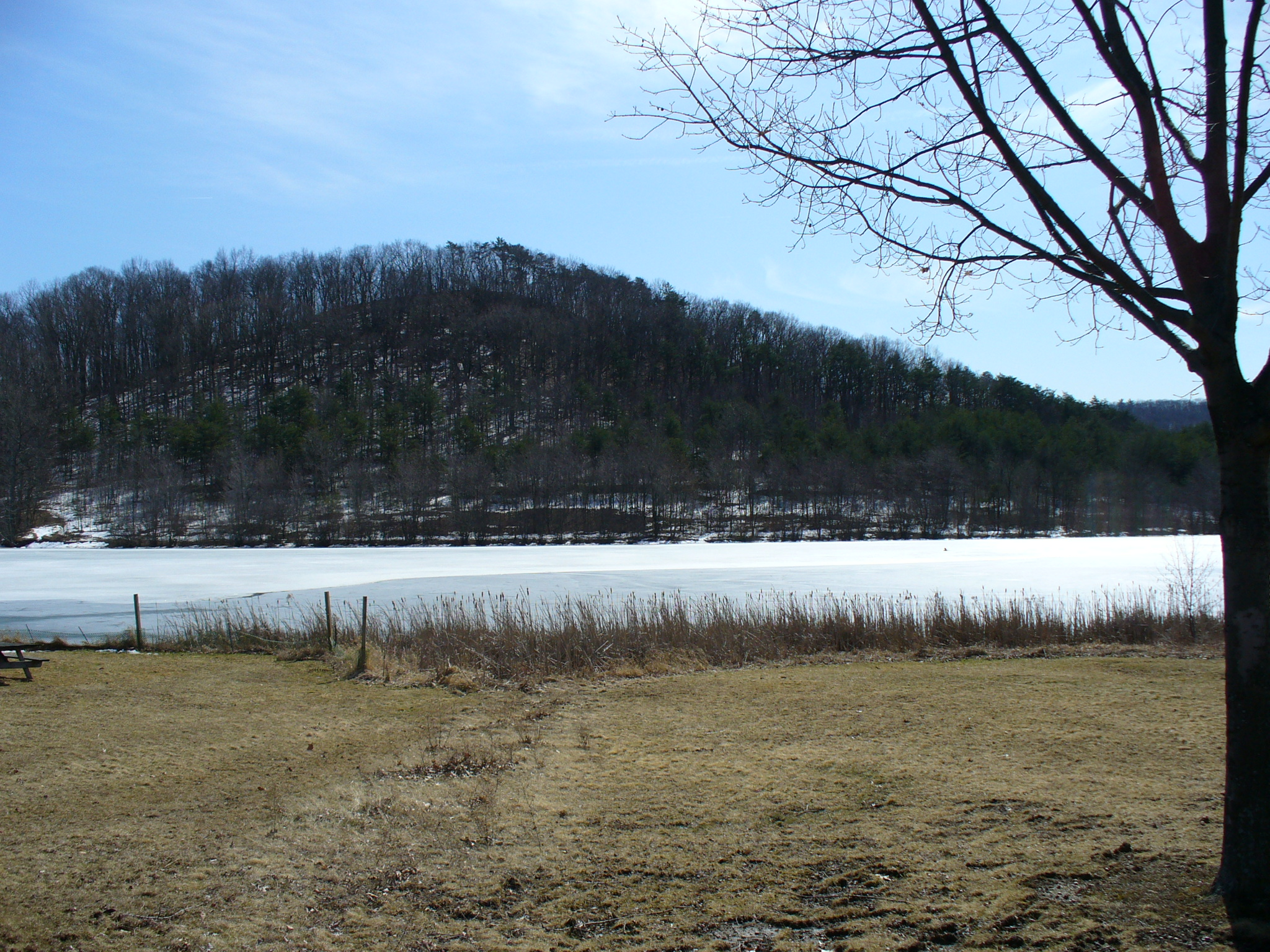
- Canoe Lake at Canoe Creek State Park

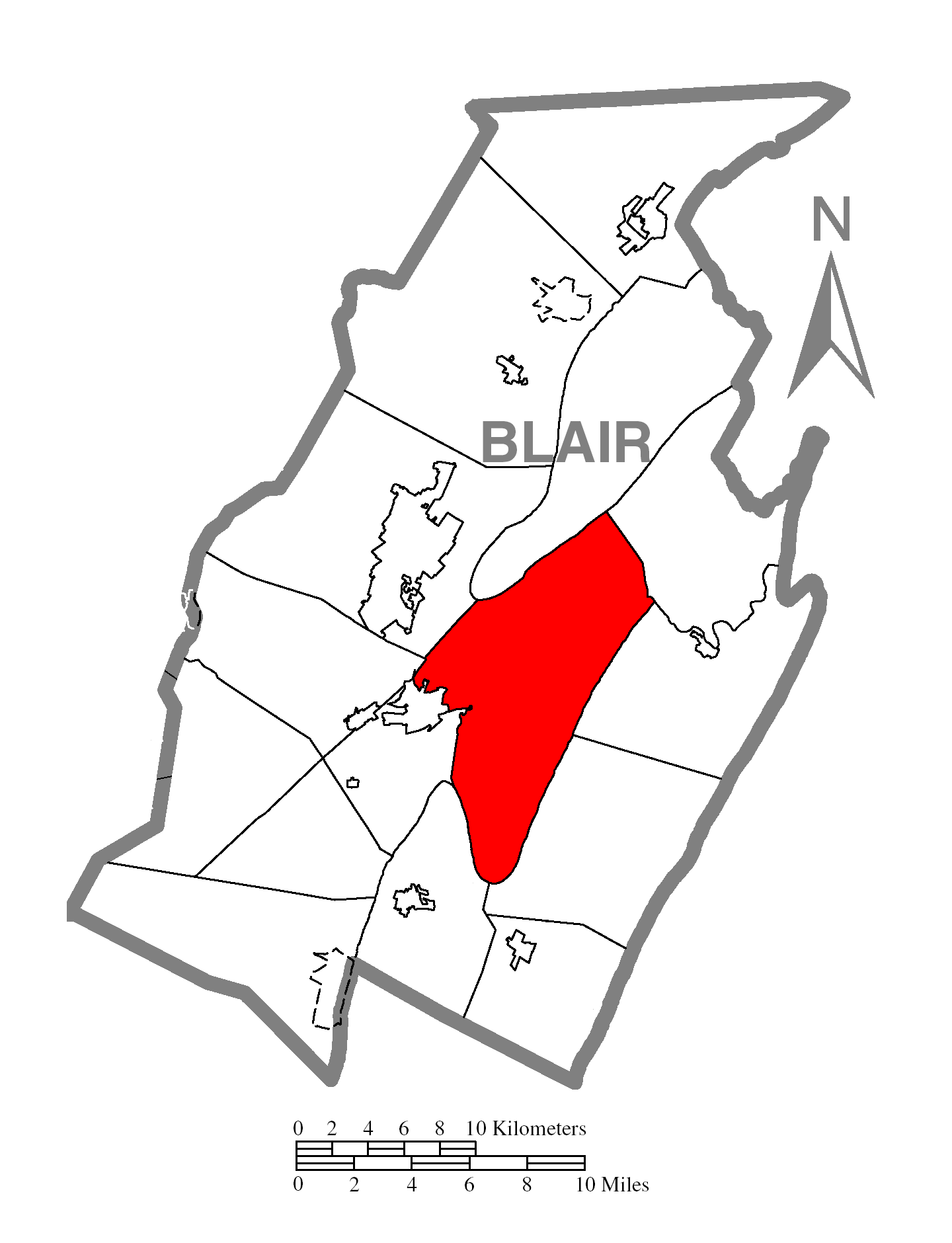
- Map of Blair County, Pennsylvania highlighting Frankstown Township

- Map of Blair County, Pennsylvania
- Country: United States
- State: Pennsylvania
- County: Blair
- Settled: 1758
- Incorporated: 1787

Government
  - Type: Board of Supervisors
  - Chairman of the Board: James Grove
  - Vice chairman: George Henry
  - Supervisor: Kenny Wertz

Area
  - Total: 49.26 sq mi (127.57 km^{2})
  - Land: 48.83 sq mi (126.46 km^{2})
  - Water: 0.43 sq mi (1.11 km^{2})

Population (2020)
  - Total: 7,399
  - Density: 151.6/sq mi (58.54/km^{2})
- Time zone: UTC-5 (Eastern (EST))
  - Summer (DST): UTC-4 (EDT)
- Area code: 814
- FIPS code: 42-013-27600
- Website: Township website

Pennsylvania Historical Marker
- Designated: April 1, 1947

Frankstown Township is a township in Blair County, Pennsylvania, United States. It is part of the Altoona Metropolitan Statistical Area. The population was 7,399 at the 2020 census. The township was named after Stephen Franks, a pioneer citizen.

== Geography ==
Frankstown Township occupies the center of Blair County. It is bordered by the borough of Hollidaysburg and Allegheny Township to the west, Logan Township and Tyrone Township to the northwest, Catharine Township to the northeast, Woodbury Township to the east, Huston Township to the southeast, and Taylor Township and Blair Township to the southwest. Unincorporated communities in the township include (from northeast to southwest) Moores Mill, Canoe Creek, Reese, Linds Crossing, Geeseytown, Frankstown, and Sylvan Hills, as well as the east half of Loop.

The township is located in the heart of the Ridge and Valley Province of the Appalachian Mountains, and a large portion of the township's borders follow ridgecrests: Brush Mountain on the northwest side, and the continuous ridge of Loop Mountain and Lock Mountain on the southwest and southeast. The Frankstown Branch of the Juniata River flows from southwest to northeast through the center of the township. U.S. Route 22 passes through the township in the same general direction as the river.

According to the United States Census Bureau, the township has a total area of 49.3 square miles (127.6 km^{2}), of which 48.8 square miles (126.5 km^{2}) are land and 0.42 square miles (1.1 km^{2}), or 0.87%, are water.

== Demographics ==
Historical population
Census	Pop.	Note	%±
2010	7,381		—
2020	7,399		0.2%
2022 (est.)	7,372		−0.4%
U.S. Decennial Census

As of the census of 2000, there were 7,694 people, 2,887 households, and 2,225 families residing in the township. The population density was 158.1 inhabitants per square mile (61.0/km^{2}). There were 3,036 housing units at an average density of 62.4 per square mile (24.1/km^{2}). The racial makeup of the township was 97.05% White, 0.42% African American, 0.04% Native American, 1.83% Asian, 0.08% from other races, and 0.58% from two or more races. Hispanic or Latino of any race were 0.56% of the population.

There were 2,887 households, out of which 33.5% had children under the age of 18 living with them, 67.9% were married couples living together, 6.5% had a female householder with no husband present, and 22.9% were non-families. 19.8% of all households were made up of individuals, and 9.5% had someone living alone who was 65 years of age or older. The average household size was 2.61 and the average family size was 3.01.

In the township the population was spread out, with 24.0% under the age of 18, 6.0% from 18 to 24, 25.6% from 25 to 44, 28.0% from 45 to 64, and 16.5% who were 65 years of age or older. The median age was 42 years. For every 100 females, there were 96.6 males. For every 100 females age 18 and over, there were 91.3 males.

The median income for a household in the township was $49,677, and the median income for a family was $54,348. Males had a median income of $40,450 versus $27,389 for females. The per capita income for the township was $24,329. About 6.8% of families and 6.5% of the population were below the poverty line, including 9.2% of those under age 18 and 6.5% of those age 65 or over.

== Recreation ==
Canoe Creek State Park is located in the northeastern part of the township.

Pennsylvania State Game Lands Number 147 is located east of Canoe Creek State Park on Dunning Mountain and a small portion of Pennsylvania State Game Lands Number 166 is located in the eastern part of the township, east of Canoe Creek Park.

== 2012 Geeseytown shooting ==
On December 21, 2012, at Geeseytown, a gunman, identified as 44-year-old Jeffrey Lee Michael, killed two men and a woman. The woman was shot inside the Juniata Valley Gospel Church on Juniata Valley Road, one man was shot outside his residence, and the other man was fatally shot after crashing his vehicle into Michael's pickup truck. In a gunfight with the police, three policemen were injured, and Michael was shot and killed.

== Notable person ==
Harold L. Ickes, U.S. Secretary of the Interior, was born in Frankstown Township in 1874.
