= Blair Gap =

Coordinates: 40°27′25″N 78°32′52″W

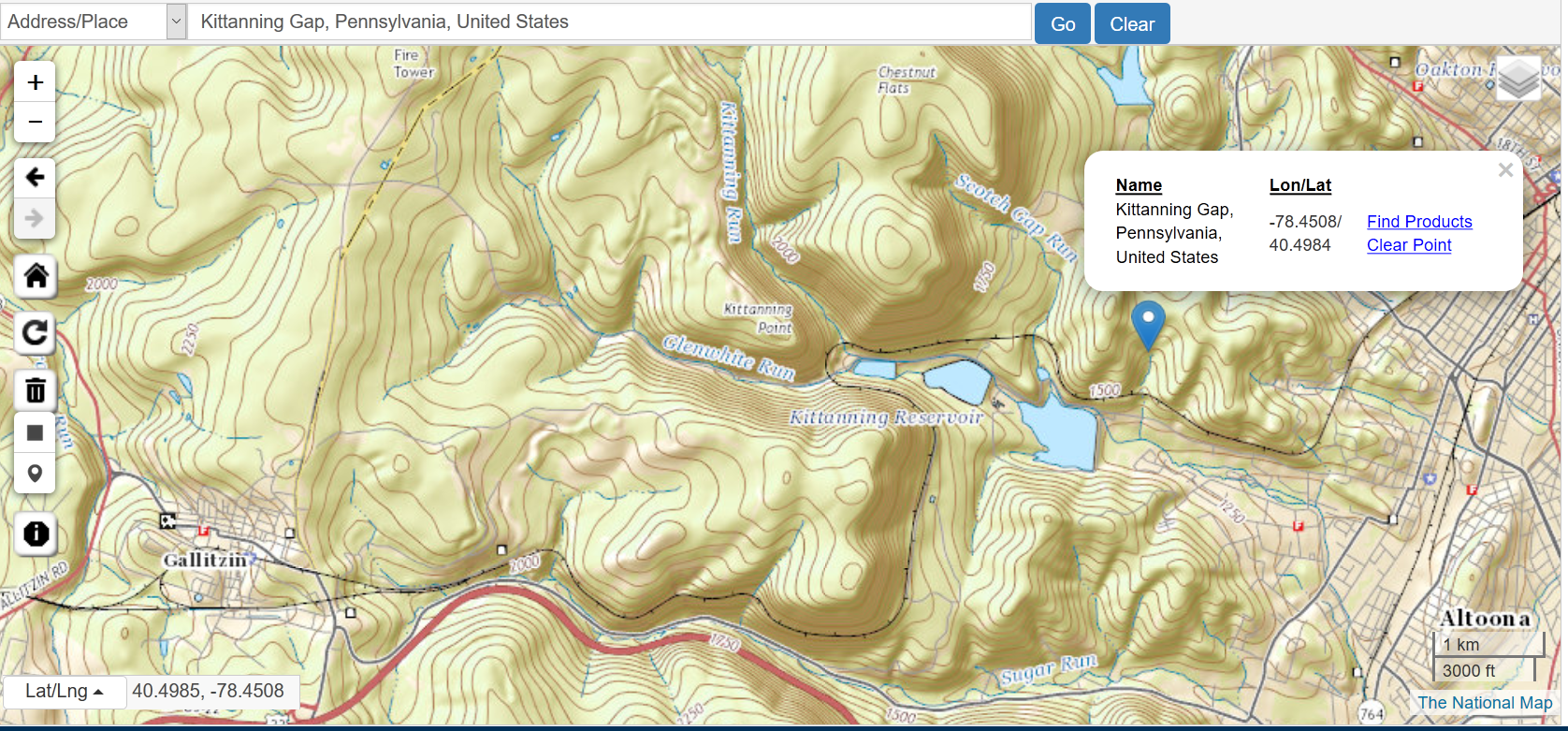
Location of Kittanning Gap in Kittanning Gap, Pennsylvania, a western suburb of Altoona. • The maps on this page also are showing the nearby PRR Horseshoe Curve which crosses three other gaps and the confluence of Kittanning Run with the indicated 'A' marker. • The Kittanning Gap gives this 'choice way of climbing the escarpment to wagons or mule trains on the way to the west side of the Allegheny Mountains and Kittanning, Pennsylvania along the Kittanning Path. Taking a right through the gap to climb up the escarpment was a bit easier than either steep narrow creek beds straight ahead.

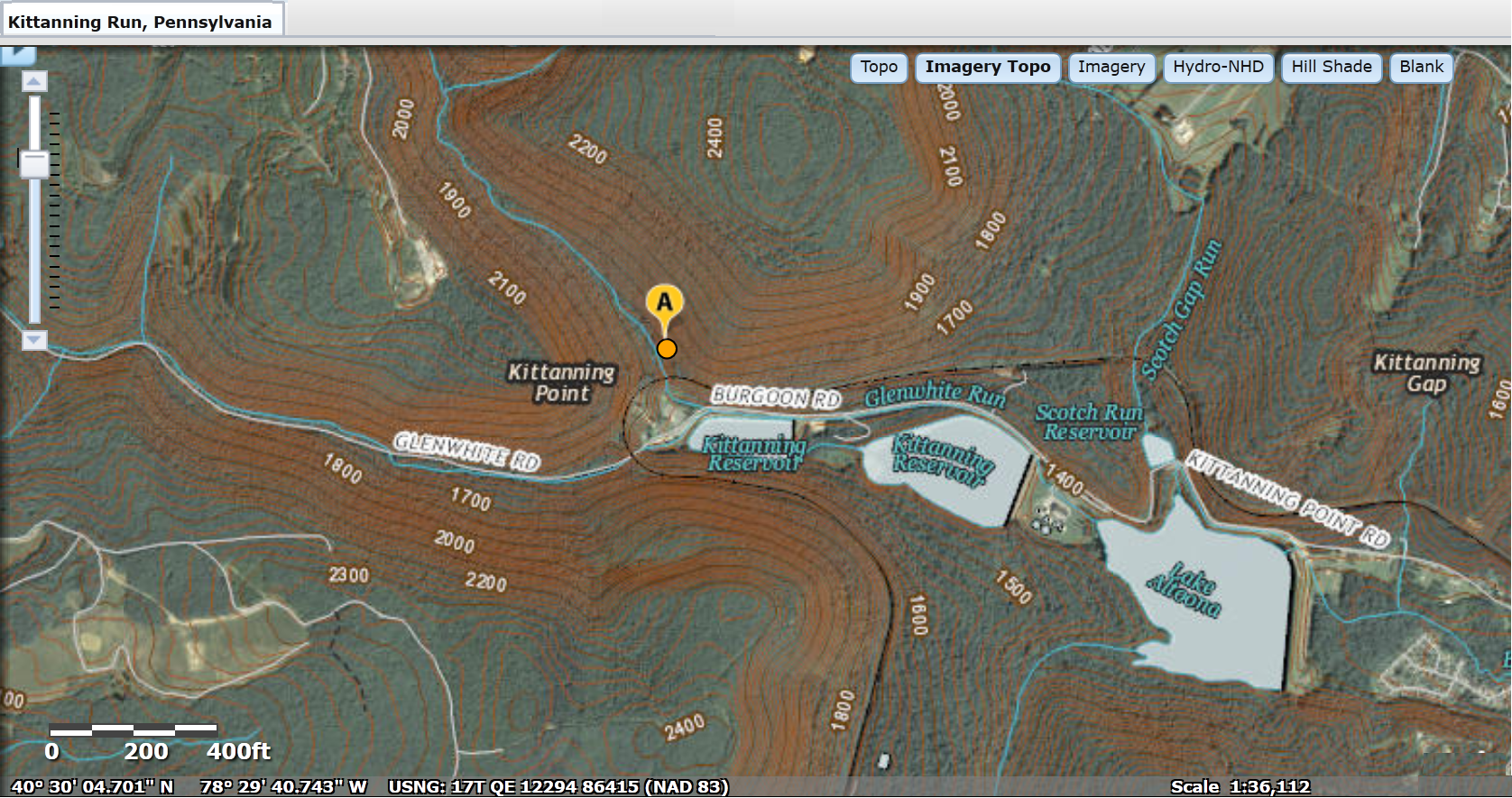
S USGS combined topological and relief map mode with the search object "Kittanning Run" identifying the search item with a short yellow point icon containing the 'A' (circled). This USGS confluence is several miles from Kittanning Gap. • The dark trace forming a hairpin turn directly below that marker is the Pennsylvania Railroad's Horseshoe Curve.

Blair Gap, one of the gaps of the Allegheny, is a water gap along the eastern face atop the Allegheny Front escarpment. Like other gaps of the Allegheny, the slopes of Blair Gap were amenable to foot travel, pack mules, and possibly wagons allowing Amerindians, and then, after about 1778–1780 settlers, to travel west into the relatively depopulated Ohio Country decades before the railroads were born and tied the country together with steel.

The gap was used historically for the upper sections of the Allegheny Portage Railroad, which as was authorized by the enabling acts in 1824 of Pennsylvania's Main Line of Public Works as part of the Pennsylvania Canal System which originally envisioned linking Pittsburgh to Philadelphia by canals. In the early 1900s, U.S. Route 22 followed alongside the watercourse through the gap.

Until the 1920s, after new founded auto clubs gathered enough numbers to political clout to push for initiatives creating roads between towns, off the railroads the primary means of travel town to town was on foot or where hauling was needed, using wagons. There were only five ways through the Appalachians east to west: Around the bottom (plains or Piedmont area) in Georgia, the Cumberland Gap, (Note: The Cumberland Gap is the route explore famously by Daniel Boone from upstate North Carolina and far southern Virginia west through the gap into Kentucky and Tennessee's eastern landforms.) the Cumberland Narrows, (Note: The Cumberland Narrows is the center route of the three interior crossings. The routes rise from the Potomac River and Chesapeake Bay basin west of Cumberland, Maryland and is the gap exploited by Chief Nemacolin's Path, the Braddock Expedition, the National Pike, the Baltimore and Ohio Railroad, the Western Maryland Railway, and US Route 40 to reach the Allegheny Plateau connecting the major eastern coastal cities of Baltimore and Washington, D.C. to reach the Monongahela River in Fayette County, Pennsylvania or Wheeling, West Virginia on the Ohio River via the historic gateway towns of Uniontown and Brownsville, PA. Alternatively, exploiting the relative flats after the main climb in Somerset County, Pennsylvania the Cumberland Narrows enables roads to jog north and descend from the plateau uplands following the watershed of the Youghiogheny River and descend to Pittsburgh. But the Youghiogheny descent also allows an easy cross-route cutting across the divide to the Allegheny valley and roads traveling upriver along the west side of the Alleghenies, connecting Maryland indirectly to the plains of the eastern Great Lakes near Erie, Pennsylvania and western New York State in the Buffalo and Rochester.) the gaps of the Allegheny Front, (Note: The terms gaps of the Allegheny and the Allegheny Front are from two different disciplines. The former used by historians describing the local measures taken during the French and Indian War and Amerindian territories before the United States Constitution. These low water gaps are located in a half-arc in the depression between higher barrier ridgelines caused by the weight of the immense plateau glacier that flattened the Appalachian Plateau long ago. In the days before academia began traveling to conferences in vacation cities and formed committees to standardize terms, place names were generally applied locally, copied by the USGS making regional maps, and in that era the last escarpment rising to the Allegheny Plateau was generally known as Allegheny Mountain or the Allegheny Ridge or just The Allegheny. The modern term of art, the Allegheny Front, was coined by the physical geologists and other earth scientists interested in geomorphology reasoning out the processes that make one landscape terrain different from another in time, cause and space.) and up the Hudson River then around the north end of the Catskills and across Upstate New York to the Great Lakes.

All other transits involve difficult climbs a man on foot can only make with great difficulty, and which animal drawn transport could not. Geographically and geologically, without the large projects and engineering capabilities of the 20th century, there were exactly three internal regions where it was possible to get animal powered vehicles from the east side to the west side of the Appalachian Mountains, making five routes overall counting traveling around the plains at either end of the western chain. Below Canada, the geologic nature of successive barrier ridges of the Ridge and Valley Appalachians runs from the valley of the Hudson, the Delaware Water Gap down through all of northern Pennsylvania, sundering eastern and central Pennsylvania, Maryland, North Carolina, Virginia, Western Pennsylvania, West Virginia, Kentucky, and Tennessee.
