= Moores Mills =

Moores Mills may refer to:

- Coopersville, Clinton County, New York, formerly Moore's Mills
- Moores Mills, New Brunswick
