= Canoe Creek, Pennsylvania =

Unincorporated community in Pennsylvania, US

- Census-designated place
- Location within the state of Pennsylvania Canoe Creek (the United States)
- Coordinates: 40°28′25″N 78°16′44″W
- Country: United States
- State: Pennsylvania
- County: Blair
- Township: Frankstown

Area
  - Total: 0.12 sq mi (0.32 km^{2})
  - Land: 0.12 sq mi (0.32 km^{2})
  - Water: 0 sq mi (0.00 km^{2})
- Elevation: 906 ft (276 m)

Population (2020)
  - Total: 66
  - Density: 542.0/sq mi (209.26/km^{2})
- Time zone: UTC-5 (Eastern (EST))
  - Summer (DST): UTC-4 (EDT)
- Area code: 814
- FIPS code: 42-11136
- GNIS feature ID: 2805471

Canoe Creek is an unincorporated community and census-designated place (CDP) in Frankstown Township, Blair County, Pennsylvania, United States. It is located on U.S. Route 22. It was first listed as a CDP prior to the 2020 census.

== Demographics ==
Historical population
Census	Pop.	Note	%±
2020	66		—
U.S. Decennial Census

== Education ==
The school district is Hollidaysburg Area School District.
