= Hollidaysburg Area School District =

School district in Pennsylvania

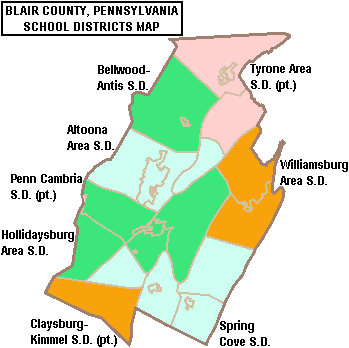

Address
- 201 Jackson St Hollidaysburg, Pennsylvania, 16648-1615; United States

District information
- Type: Public

Students and staff
- District mascot: Golden Tiger
- Colors: Navy, Gold, and White

Other information
- Website: https://www.hasdtigers.com

The Hollidaysburg Area School District is a midsized, suburban public school district which is based in Hollidaysburg, Pennsylvania. It serves the boroughs of Duncansville, Hollidaysburg, and Newry, and the townships of Allegheny, Blair, Frankstown, and Juniata.

This district encompasses approximately 120 square miles (310 km^{2}). According to 2010 local census data, it serves a resident population of 27,555.

In 2009, the district residents’ per capita income was $19,907, while the median family income was $44,181. In the Commonwealth, the median family income was $49,501 and the United States median family income was $49,445, in 2010.

== Schools ==
The Hollidaysburg Area School District operates two secondary and three elementary schools, also controls other buildings.

- Hollidaysburg Area High School
- Hollidaysburg Area Junior High School
- Charles W. Longer Elementary School
- Foot of Ten Elementary School
- Frankstown Elementary School

== Extracurriculars ==
The district offers an extensive variety of clubs, activities and various sports.

=== Sports ===
The District funds:

Boys

- Baseball - AAA
- Basketball -AAAA
- Cross Country - AAA
- Football - AAA
- Golf - AAA
- Indoor Track and Field - AAAA
- Soccer - AAA
- Swimming and Diving - AAA
- Tennis - AAA
- Track and Field - AAA
- Wrestling - AAA

Girls

- Basketball - AAAA
- Cross Country - AAA
- Golf - AAA
- Indoor Track and Field - AAAA
- Soccer (Fall) - AAA
- Swimming and Diving - AAA
- Softball - AAA
- Girls' Tennis - AAA
- Track and Field - AAA
- Volleyball - AAA

Junior high school sports

Boys

- Basketball
- Football
- Soccer
- Track and Field
- Wrestling

Girls

- Basketball
- Soccer (Fall)
- Softball
- Track and Field
- Volleyball

=== Football ===
The program currently competes in class AAAAA of the PIAA and is independent. The first season was in 1920 and the team had a 4–2 record under George Carl. The program today has five hundred and eighty wins. The team has won ten District Championships: five under head coach Harold Price (1985, 1989, 1990, 1993, 1995), three under current head coach John Barton (1999, 2006, 2008) and three under head coach Homer DeLattre (2017, 2018, 2020, 2021, 2023, 2024, 2025). Homer DeLattre also lead the tigers to two state quarterfinals in 2024 and 2025.

Construction began in the spring of 2004 on a new artificial turf to replace the existing grass field. The new field provided the opportunity for other sports and events to use the facility as well. Two renovated concession stands and an information kiosk were also completed. Tiger Stadium is being updated by the restore the roar project. This project includes new turf, fixed lighting, new fencing, and the addition of field houses for home and away teams.

Record since 1998

Coach	Year	Wins	Losses
Phil Ricco	1998	5	6
John Barton	1999	11	2
John Barton	2000	7	4
John Barton	2001	4	7
John Barton	2002	8	3
John Barton	2003	6	5
John Barton	2004	4	5
John Barton	2005	3	7
John Barton	2006	8	5
John Barton	2007	9	3
John Barton	2008	10	2
John Barton	2009	4	7
John Barton	2010	6	4
John Barton	2011	3	5
John Barton	2012	3	7
Homer DeLattre	2013	3	7
Homer DeLattre	2014	4	5
Homer DeLattre	2015	6	4
Homer DeLattre	2016	6	5
Homer DeLattre	2017	8	4
Homer DeLattre	2018	9	5
Homer DeLattre	2019	6	5
Homer DeLattre	2020	4	4
Homer DeLattre	2021	6	5
Homer DeLattre	2022	2	8
Homer DeLattre	2023	5	6
Homer DeLattre	2024	13	1
Homer DeLattre	2025	13	1

- According to PIAA directory July 2012
