= Marysville Bridge =

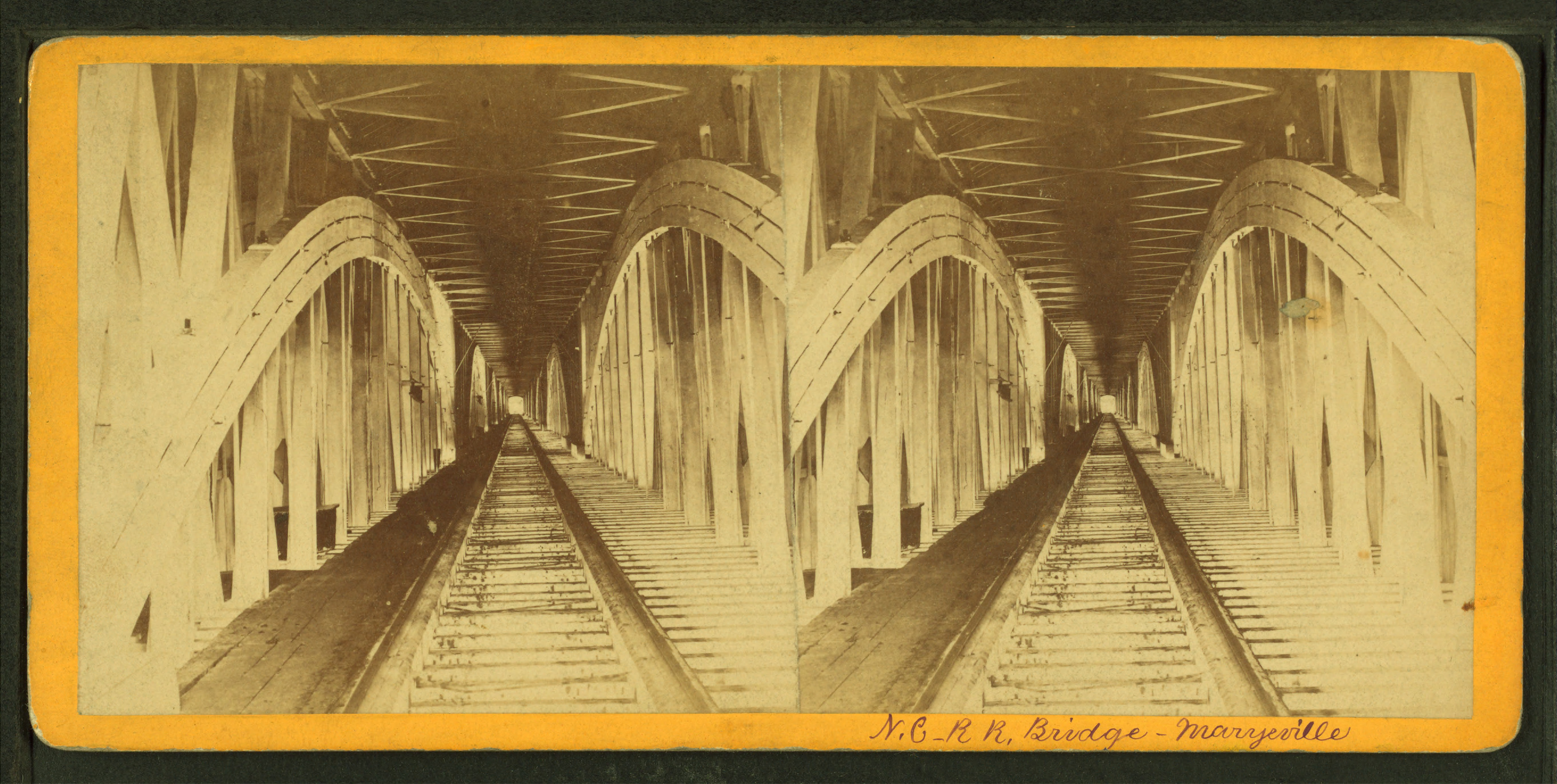
- Interior of the Marysville Bridge
- Coordinates: 40.3605°N 76.9290°W
- Crosses: Susquehanna River
- Locale: (ruins) Marysville, Pennsylvania and Dauphin, Pennsylvania

Location
- Interactive map of Marysville Bridge

The Marysville Bridge was a covered bridge railroad crossing of the Susquehanna River between Marysville, Pennsylvania and Dauphin, Pennsylvania. It was built in 1858 and demolished in 1903. Several of its piers still remain in the river; one of them bears a small-scale replica of the Statue of Liberty.

== Marysville Bridge ==
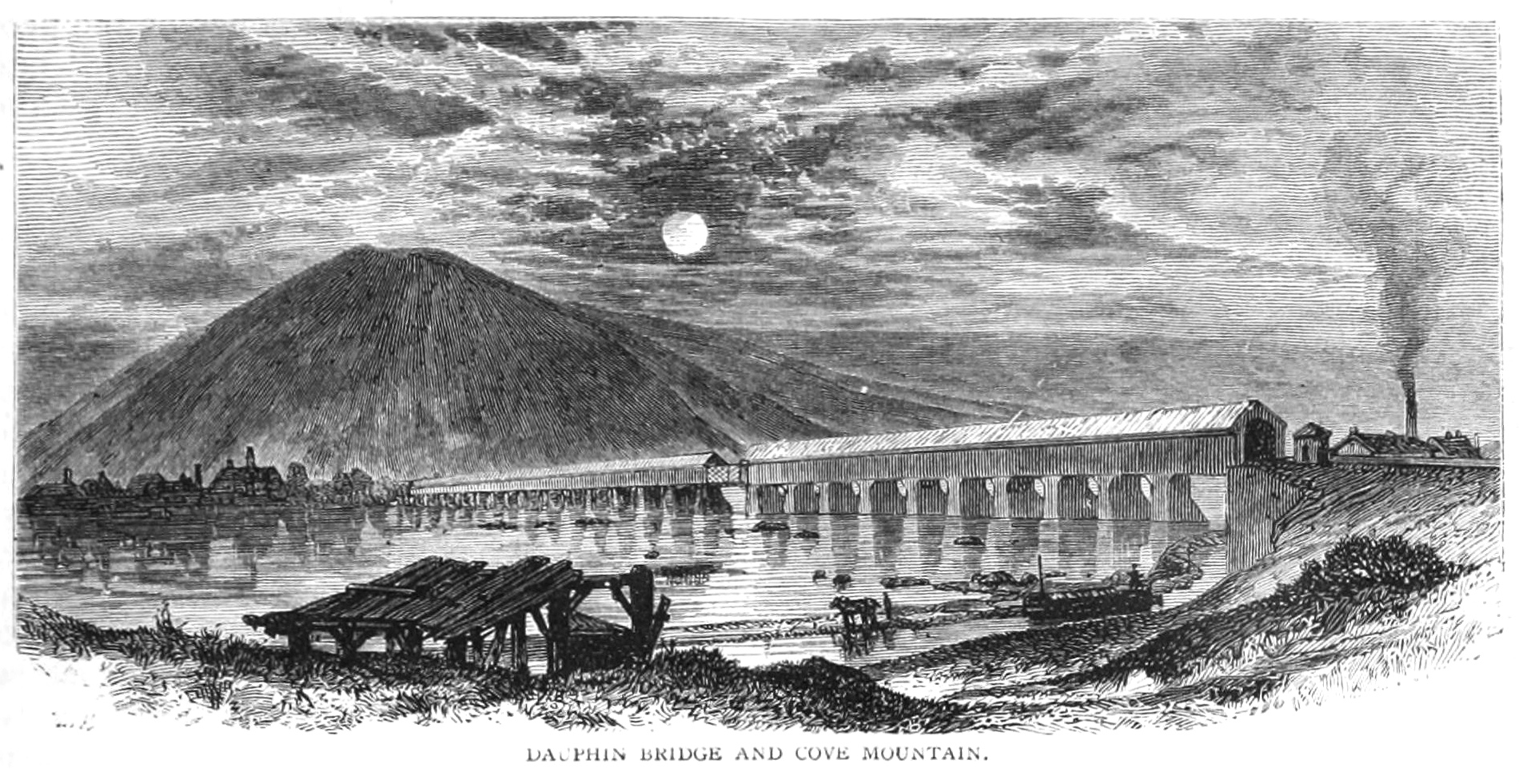
The Dauphin (or Marysville) railroad bridge in 1872

As the Northern Central Railway built north up the Susquehanna River from Baltimore, Maryland to the coal regions, it had to cross from the west to the east bank of the Susquehanna. The chosen crossing site was at the Dauphin Narrows, between Marysville on the west and Dauphin on the east. The bridge was finished in 1858, allowing the Northern Central to haul coal from Sunbury, Pennsylvania to Baltimore. However, the construction of a line from Dauphin to Rockville and the takeover of the Northern Central by the Pennsylvania Railroad in 1875 resulted in most Northern Central traffic being rerouted over the PRR's Rockville Bridge a short distance downstream.

The Marysville Bridge was allowed to fall into decay, and removed in 1902 or 1903 after a period of disuse. Some of the piers remain above water today, while others are submerged or washed away.

== Dauphin Narrows Statue of Liberty ==
On July 2, 1986, a replica of the Statue of Liberty was erected on one of its piers in the Dauphin Narrows of the Susquehanna River. It was made of venetian blinds and stood 18 feet (5.5 m) tall. Six years later, after it was destroyed in a windstorm, it was rebuilt after local citizens raised $25,000 and rebuilt it out of wood, metal, glass and fiberglass, to a height of 25 feet (7.6 m).

It was initially unknown who built the original version, and it remained a local mystery for 25 years until Gene Stilp, a local activist, came forward and admitted to constructing the initial replica. After Stilp came forward, the replica statue was featured on the CBS Evening News in October 2011.
