= Beaufort Farms, Pennsylvania =

Unincorporated community in Pennsylvania, US

Beaufort Farms
- Interactive map of Beaufort Farms
- Coordinates: 40.32267°N 76.87306°W
- Country: United States
- State: Pennsylvania
- County: Dauphin
- Townships: Susquehanna
- Elevation: 176 m (577 ft)
- Time zone: UTC-5 (Eastern (EST))
  - Summer (DST): UTC-4 (EDT)
- ZIP codes: 17110
- Area codes: 717 and 223

Beaufort Farms (/ˈboʊfərt/ BOH-fərt) is an unincorporated community in northern Susquehanna Township, Dauphin County, Pennsylvania, in the Harrisburg–Carlisle Metropolitan Statistical Area. It is a historical farmland settlement and currently developed community of neighborhoods. Previous names for the area have included Beaufort or Calder Farms.

== History ==
=== Early settlement and farm ===
William Calder Sr. of the prominent Calder family of Dauphin County moved to Harrisburg from Lancaster in 1812 along with the migration of the Pennsylvania State Capitol. Five years later, he married his wife, Mary Kirkwood (after whom Kirkwood Road was later named). He amassed a fortune in the business of stagecoaches, though his first passion was farming and raising livestock. A decade before his death in 1861, his son William Jr. inherited the family business and farms. The Calder family would own seven farms total by 1879 near Harrisburg for a collective of 900 acres, which were known as Calder Farms.

William Calder Jr. would soon be recruited as investor and president of Senator David Fleming's Harrisburg Car Manufacturing Company for rolling stock and would become one of the prominent industrialized companies at the time. (Note: This is also seen styled in documents as the East Harrisburg Passenger Railway Company) (Note: David Fleming is also a distant relative of Samuel W. Fleming Jr., who would go on to become a partner at the locally-based civil engineering firm Gannett Fleming and later help to form the Beaufort Hunt in the neighborhood) In 1892, Ehrman B. Mitchell Sr. married Calder's daughter and they would eventually inherit the land. As of 1895, John S. Reichert lived on the farmland and maintained it full-time, and Reichert Road was named for him. During the 1890s, as streetcar routes extended out from Harrisburg into Susquehanna Township (such as Rockville and Progress), much of the farmlands owned by Harrisburg businessmen were divided into tracts of land for future suburban development.

When Mitchell died in 1913, Ehrman II and his sister Mary Gallagher inherited the land, which was maintained by Ehrman II as a successful dairy and fruit farm for several decades. Its location led to utilizing the nearby Pennsylvania Canal, and at the time was the only producer to deliver milk directly to the consumer. Native Americans who once resided on parts of the land were said to have graves that were visible until circa 1930.

=== Beaufort Hunt ===
In 1929, Ehrman B. Mitchell II formed the American Beaufort Hunt on his land. With friend Farley Gannett, special permission was granted by Henry Somerset, 10th Duke of Beaufort to use the name Beaufort and a hunt livery of blue with buff trimming. During this time, Beaufort Farms was a member of the American Berkshire Association.

=== Development ===
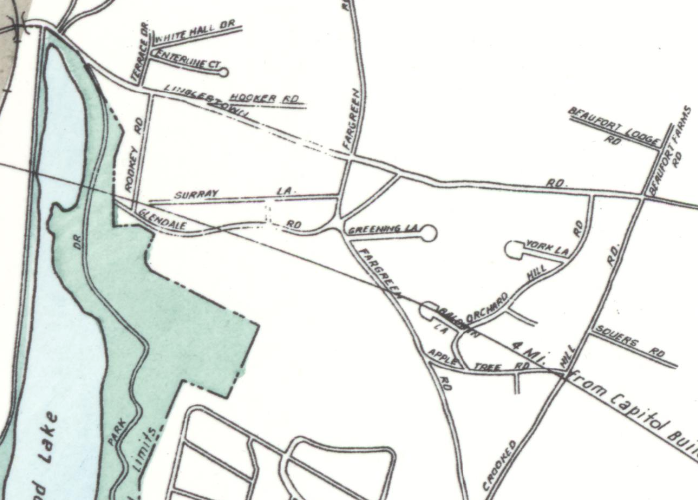
This Sanborn map from 1956 shows the early streets created for the development of Beaufort Farms.

By 1947, Ehrman II declined into ill health, and seeing the orchards going to waste caused him to ask his horse trainer and confidant, Flippen Wilkerson, what to make of the land. Upon the suggestion of development and later approval by the Township, Ehrman II and his sister Mary Gallagher formally announced the plans for gradual sale of lots within property for a residential development. Various size lots would be sold and the owner was free to imagine the home so long as the architectural designs were approved, and plots over an acre were allowed to keep livestock. Eighty acres from the existing thousand acres were opened for sale and the initial Orchard Hill Road and Apple Tree Road were paved. By February 1948 15 plots were already sold. Into the 1950s developers acquired more property, planned communities, and encouraged large-scale development efforts. To date, more neighborhoods and subdivisions continue from the land.

== Geography ==
The area is located in Ward 8 of the township, roughly bounded today by Linglestown Road to the north, Crooked Hill Road to the east, Windsor Farms or Montfort Drive to the south, and U.S. Route 322 and Wildwood Park to the west.

== Notable people ==
- Ehrman Mitchell III
- Adam Resnick
