= Estherton, Pennsylvania =

Unincorporated community in Pennsylvania, US

- Unincorporated area
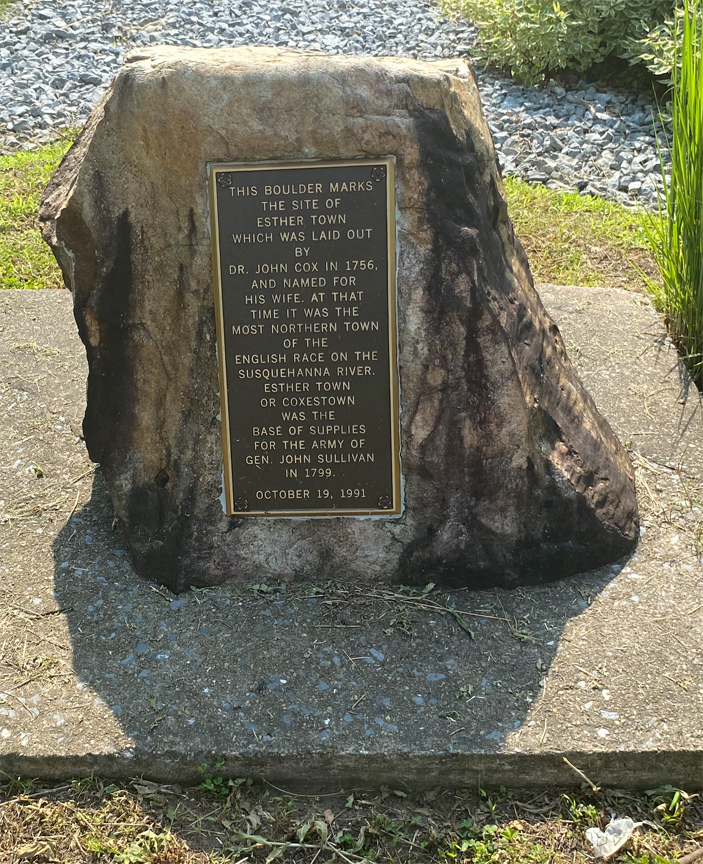
- Boulder in Estherton, PA, once signifying where the town was laid in 1756. It was moved from its original location along the riverfront and rededicated in 1991.

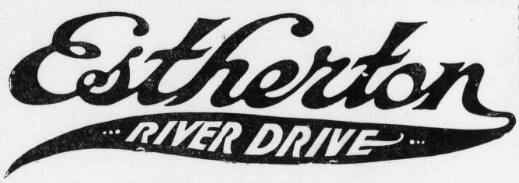
- The header of an advertisement for Estherton

- Location within the state of Pennsylvania Estherton (the United States)
- Coordinates: 40°18′44″N 76°53′52″W
- Country: United States
- State: Pennsylvania
- County: Dauphin
- Township: Susquehanna
- Time zone: UTC-5 (Eastern (EST))
  - Summer (DST): UTC-4 (EDT)
- ZIP codes: 17110
- Area codes: 717 and 223

Estherton is an unincorporated area and neighborhood in Susquehanna Township, Dauphin County, Pennsylvania, United States, and a part of the Harrisburg-Carlisle area. It is situated on the Susquehanna River, just north of the city of Harrisburg and above the Montrose Park neighborhood but below the Lucknow neighborhood within Susquehanna Township. Interstate 81 runs through the community to the George N. Wade Memorial Bridge.

== History ==
Estherton was founded as Coxestown, or Coxtown, in 1756 by Dr. John Cox Jr. after his wife, Esther. (Note: There is some debate when the Coxes entirely obtained the land. It is thought John Cox purchased it from the Penns. However, there is a deed recorded in the Lancaster Courthouse dated Aug. 26, 1764 in which Samuel Mifflin and his wife conveyed to John Cox one-half interest in a 338 acre tract of land along the river. Irma Watts (1926) speculated the plausibility that John Cox already had the other half interest, or that it augmented other holdings of his, as Estherton was laid out during the time of the French and Indian War.) It was the second town laid out in Dauphin County, after Middletown. In 1779, Estherton was used as a supply depot during the Sullivan Expedition. This continued furthermore as the town was a port of call as goods were transported down the river. In 1800, Methodist families formed the Coxestown Methodist Episcopal Church, which would be moved and renamed many times to what is currently St. Marks United Methodist Church. Before 1828 the "Coxestown Inn" was formed and was a popular visit for those passing by with the river trade, and would develop a notorious reputation as a rowdy roadhouse that continued through the era of automobile parties; it was later raided by Prohibition Agents before finally burning down in 1926. In the early 1970s Interstate 81 was built through the area.
