= Warfel =

Warfel is a surname. Notable people with the surname include:

- Betty Warfel (1928–1990), American baseball player
- Henry C. Warfel (1844–1923), American Civil War veteran
- Michael William Warfel (born 1948), American Roman Catholic bishop
