= Susquehanna Township, Dauphin County, Pennsylvania =

Township in Pennsylvania, US

Coordinates: 40°20′00″N 76°52′59″W

- Township
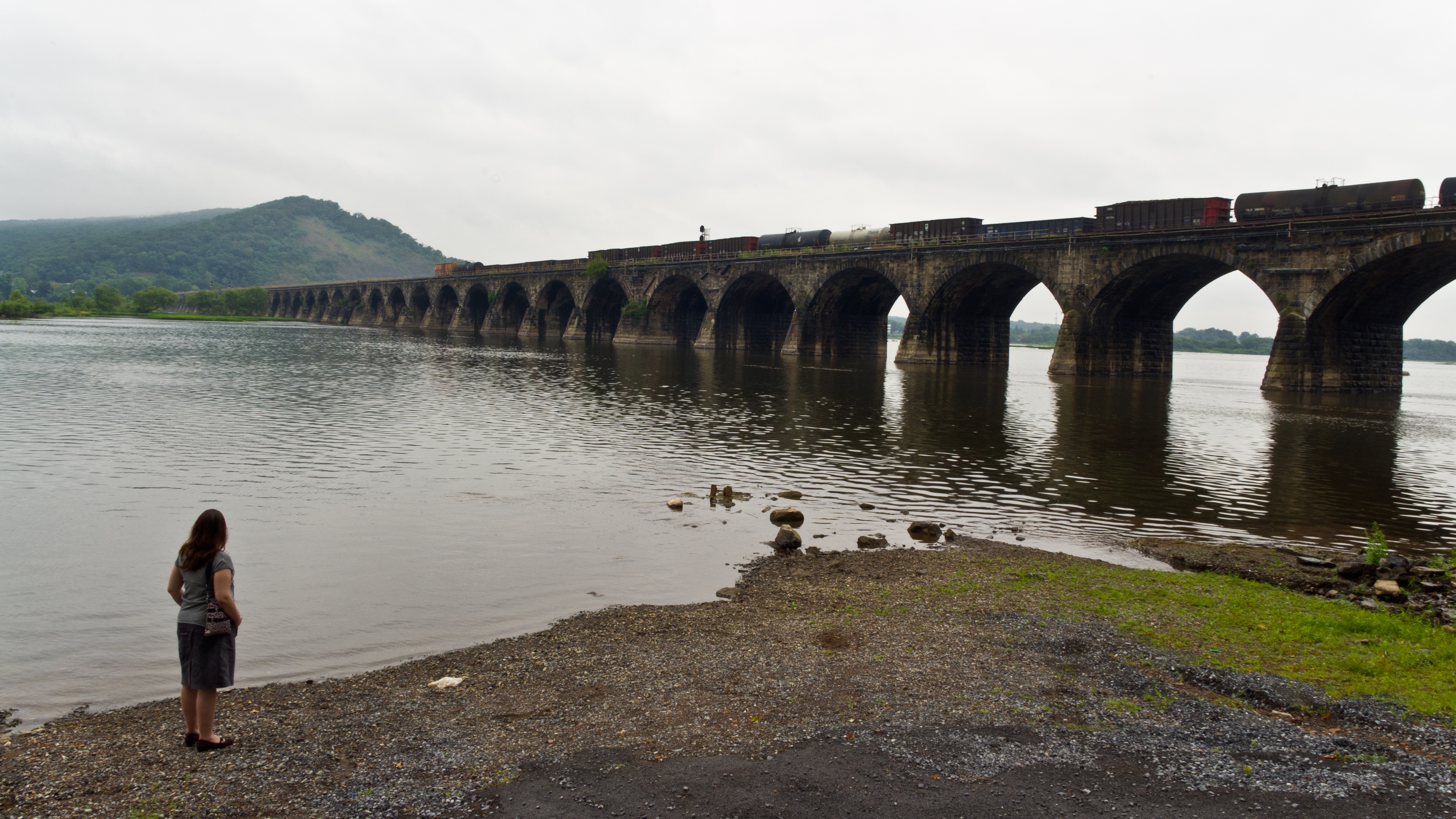
- The Rockville Bridge over the Susquehanna River

- Location in Dauphin County and state of Pennsylvania.
- Country: United States
- State: Pennsylvania
- County: Dauphin
- Incorporated: 1815

Government
  - Type: Board of Commissioners

Area
  - Total: 15.27 sq mi (39.56 km^{2})
  - Land: 13.34 sq mi (34.55 km^{2})
  - Water: 1.93 sq mi (5.01 km^{2})

Population (2020)
  - Total: 26,740 ▲
  - Estimate (2024): 28,214
  - Density: 2,004.2/sq mi (773.84/km^{2})
- Time zone: UTC-5 (Eastern (EST))
  - Summer (DST): UTC-4 (EDT)
- ZIP codes: 17109, 17110
- Area codes: 717 and 223
- FIPS code: 42-043-75528
- Website: www.susquehannatwp.com

Susquehanna Township is a township in Dauphin County, Pennsylvania, United States. The population was 26,740 at the time of the 2020 census. This represents a 11.2% increase from the 2010 census count of 24,036. Susquehanna Township has the postal ZIP codes 17109 and 17110, which maintain the Harrisburg place name designation. The township is a suburb of Harrisburg and is connected to Marysville by the Rockville Bridge, the world's longest stone-arch rail bridge at the time of its completion.

== History ==
Susquehanna Township is located adjacent to the city of Harrisburg in Dauphin County. It was named from the Susquehanna River which runs along its western edge.

On June 4, 1785, the state legislature created Dauphin County from part of Lancaster County. By that time, the territory of today's Dauphin County had been divided among the townships of Derry, Londonderry, Lower Paxtang and Upper Paxtang. The spelling "Paxtang" is from the original Indian name Peshtank, which meant "standing water" and further morphed into "Paxton." Susquehanna Township was incorporated from part of Lower Paxtang on May 1, 1815.

The first settlement where Susquehanna Township now lies was known as "Coxestown" and was laid out by Dr. John Cox Jr. of Philadelphia on October 2, 1757. In honor of his wife, Ester, the town was renamed "Estherton" and was the second oldest town in Dauphin County (behind Middletown). In 1774, a second settlement, "Rockville", and a third in 1815, "Progress" were settled. On January 2, 1952, Susquehanna became a First Class township via the Dauphin County Court.

Up until the 1950s, the Pennsylvania State Police serviced the township, with a township room space in Progress once dedicated to them to use as a substation as a gesture of thanks. In September 1955, Charles S. Hill was sworn in as the first police officer, and he used his own car for patrol duty. With continuing growth, he would become the first chief and by the early 1960s there would be four officers.

The Rockville Bridge was listed on the National Register of Historic Places in 1975.

== Geography ==
According to the United States Census Bureau, Susquehanna Township has a total area of 15.3 square miles (39.6 km^{2}), of which 13.3 square miles (34.5 km^{2}) is land and 1.9 square miles (5.0 km^{2}), or 12.66%, is water. It is drained by the Susquehanna River, which separates it from Cumberland County and Perry County to the west. The north end of the township is on Blue Mountain, and Susquehanna Township's elevations range from approximately 300 feet (91 m) on the river to 1,150 feet (350 m) in the northeast.

The township's numbered roads include Interstate 81, U.S. Route 22, U.S. Route 322, and Pennsylvania Route 39. Other local roads include Elmerton Avenue and Progress Avenue.

=== Unincorporated communities and census designated places in Susquehanna Township ===
- Beaufort Farms
- Edgemont
- Estherton
- Lucknow
- Montrose Park
- Paxtang Manor
- Progress
- Rockville

=== Adjacent municipalities ===
- Middle Paxton Township (north)
- Lower Paxton Township (east)
- Swatara Township (south)
- Paxtang (south)
- Harrisburg (southwest and west)
- Penbrook (southwest)
- East Pennsboro Township, Cumberland County (west)
- Marysville, Perry County (northwest)

== Demographics ==
Historical population
Census	Pop.	Note	%±
1940	8,716		—
1950	11,081		27.1%
1960	17,474		57.7%
1970	17,008		−2.7%
1980	18,034		6.0%
1990	18,636		3.3%
2000	21,895		17.5%
2010	24,036		9.8%
2020	26,740		11.2%
2024 (est.)	28,214		5.5%
U.S. Decennial Census

As of the census of 2020, there were 26,736 people, 10,529 households residing in the township. The population density was 2,004.2 inhabitants per square mile (773.8/km^{2}). The racial makeup of the township was 60.6% White, 27.3% African American, 0.1% Native American, 5.6% Asian, 0.00% Pacific Islander, and 3.7% from two or more races. Hispanic or Latino of any race were 7.0% of the population.

The median income for a household in the township was $68,674. The per capita income for the township was $34,875. About 9.1% of the population was below the poverty line.

== Attractions ==
- The National Civil War Museum is just inside the township boundary, though owned by the bordering municipality of the City of Harrisburg.
- Capital Area Greenbelt runs through the Township.

== Politics and government ==
=== Legislators ===
- State Representative Justin Fleming, Democrat, 105th district
- State Senator John DiSanto, Republican, 15th district
- US Representative Scott Perry, Republican, 10th district

=== Board of Commissioners ===
Susquehanna Township is a first-class township and elects nine commissioners by ward.

Ward	Name	Term		Board title
Ward	Name	Elected	Expiration	Board title
Ward 1	Jody Rebarchak	Unknown	2028	
Ward 2	Gary Rothrock	Unknown	2026	
Ward 3	Carl Hisiro	Unknown	2028	
Ward 4	Frank Lynch	Unknown	2026	President
Ward 5	Sean Sanderson	Unknown	2028	
Ward 6	Fred Faylona	Unknown	2026	
Ward 7	Fred Engle Jr.	Unknown	2028	
Ward 8	Pamela Cross	Unknown	2026	
Ward 9	Steven C. Napper	Unknown	2028	Vice President

=== Other municipal positions ===
Title	Name	Term	
Title	Name	Elected	Expiration
Manager	David Pribulka	Non-elected position	
Tax Collector	Dauphin County Treasurer	(Note: This is only a partial term due to prior resignation. Dauphin County failed to include this on the document above.)	
Auditor	Zelenkofske Axelrod	Non-elected position	
Solicitor	Michael M. Miller, Esq.	Non-elected position	
