= East Pennsboro Area School District =

School district in Pennsylvania

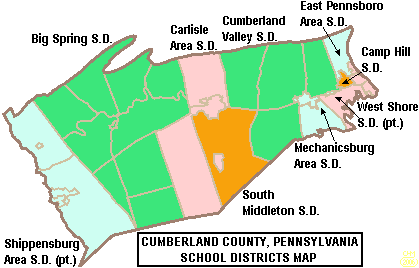

Address
- 890 Valley Street Enola, Cumberland County, Pennsylvania, 17025-1541; United States

District information
- Grades: K-12

Students and staff
- District mascot: Panthers

Other information
- Website: East Pennsboro Area School District Homepage

The East Pennsboro Area School District is a midsized, suburban, public school district located in Cumberland County, Pennsylvania, US. The district is one of the 496 public school districts of Pennsylvania. East Pennsboro Area School District serves: East Pennsboro Township and the CDPs of Enola, Summerdale, West Fairview and parts of the Borough of Camp Hill. According to 2000 federal census data, it served a resident population of 18,254 people. By 2010, the District's population increased to 20,267 people. In 2009, the East Pennsboro Area School District residents' per capita income was $22,517, while the median family income was $54,142. The educational attainment levels for the School District population (25 years old and over) were 92.2% high school graduates and 29.5% college graduates.

East Pennsboro Area School District operates four schools: East Pennsboro Elementary School, West Creek Hills Elementary School, East Pennsboro Area Middle School, and East Pennsboro High School. East Pennsboro Area School District is served by the Capital Area Intermediate Unit 15 which offers a variety of services, including a completely developed K-12 curriculum that is mapped and aligned with the Pennsylvania Academic Standards (available online), shared services, a group purchasing program and a wide variety of special education and special needs services, including teachers who work with the students. High school students may choose to attend Cumberland Perry Area Vocational Technical School for training in the construction and mechanical trades.
