= Edgemont, Pennsylvania =

Unincorporated community in Pennsylvania, US

- Unincorporated community
- Motto: "Edgemont is a place called home where the community comes from humble beginnings"
- Location within Pennsylvania
- Coordinates: 40°17′6″N 76°50′56″W
- Country: United States
- State: Pennsylvania
- County: Dauphin
- Township: Susquehanna
- Elevation: 486 ft (148 m)
- Time zone: UTC-5 (Eastern (EST))
  - Summer (DST): UTC-4 (EDT)
- Area codes: 717 and 223

Edgemont is an unincorporated community in Susquehanna Township, Dauphin County, Pennsylvania, United States and is part of the Harrisburg-Carlisle Metropolitan Statistical Area, bordering the state capital of Harrisburg to the northeast, and the nearby census-designated place of Progress.

== History ==
The Edgemont Realty Company, owned by Col. J.C. Morrow and Arthur Young, sold lots between Locust Lane and Brook Avenue at public auction in 1906 for as little as $15. In 1917, the two-room Glenwood Schoolhouse was built to serve grades 1-6. Following the demolition of Harrisburg's Old Eighth Ward by the 1920s, many of the Ward's black residents first relocated to Edgemont. By this time, the area was still mostly undeveloped farms and woodlands. The Edgemont Volunteer Fire Company was first organized as a bucket brigade in 1920, the oldest in the Township. In 1936, after beginning a career teaching at the Glenwood School, Anna L. Carter undertook the challenge of organizing philanthropic clubs and after school programs, and would eventually become principal and namesake for a local elementary school. The streets went unpaved until the 1950s, and a full sewer and water project was completed by the early 1970s.
