= East Pennsboro Township, Cumberland County, Pennsylvania =

Township in Pennsylvania, US

Coordinates: 40°14′59″N 76°56′29″W

East Pennsboro Township, Pennsylvania
- Township
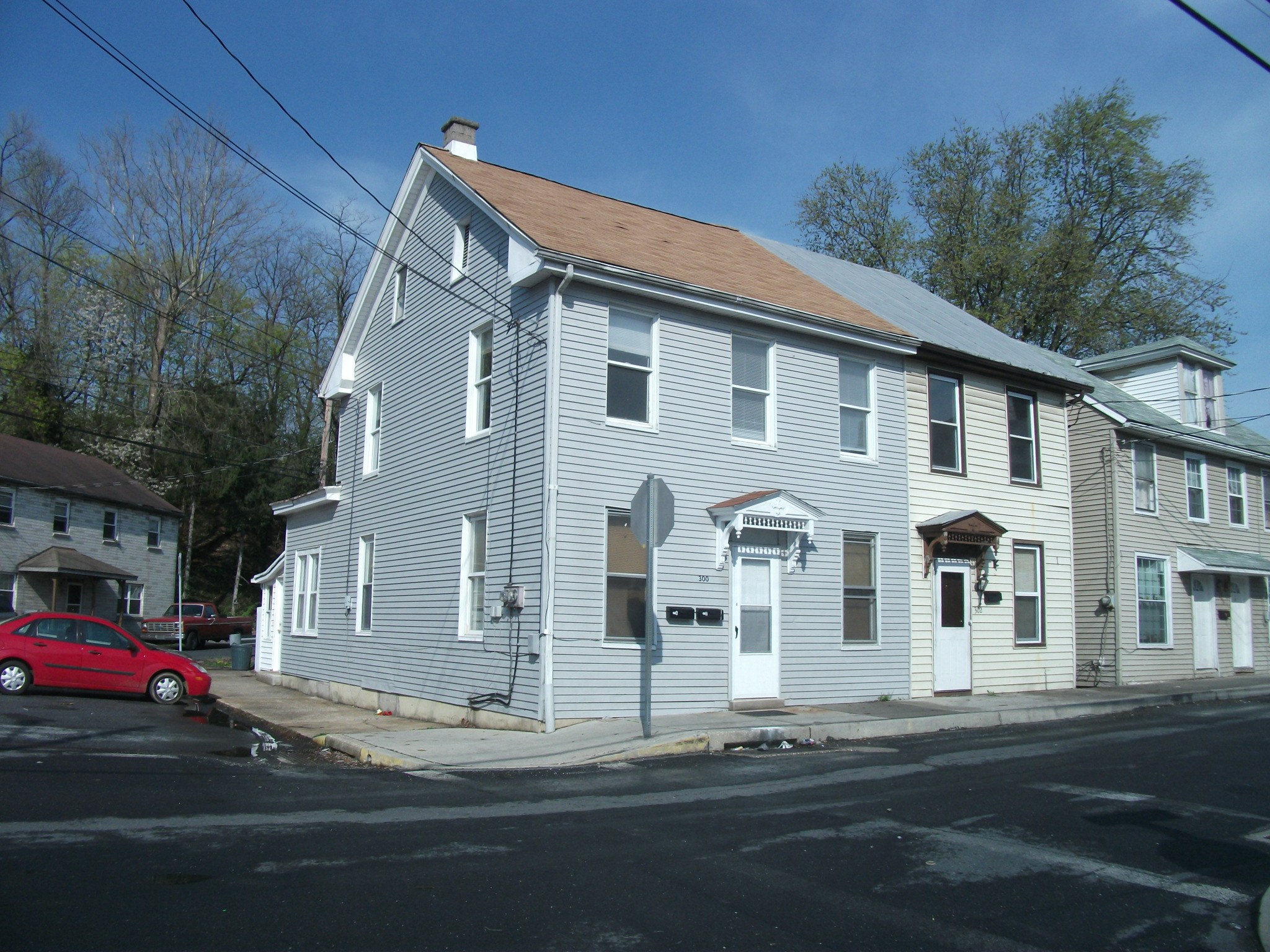
- West Fairview is a former borough that is now part of the township.

- Seal

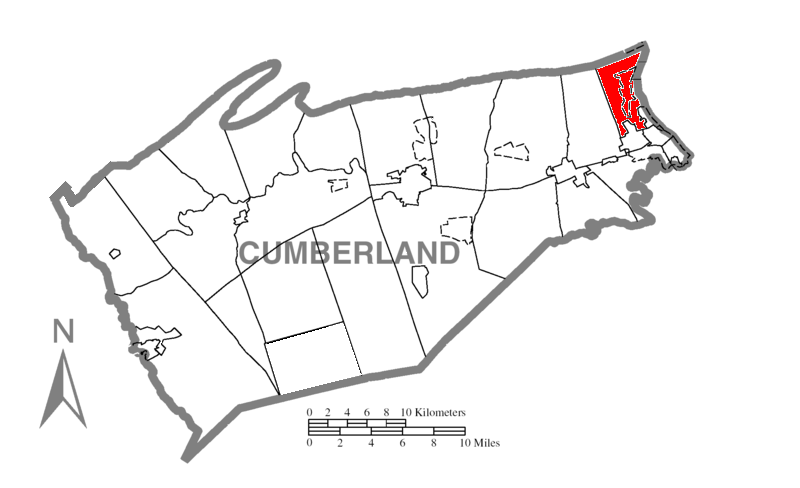
- Map of Cumberland County, Pennsylvania highlighting East Pennsboro Township

- Map of Cumberland County, Pennsylvania
- Country: United States
- State: Pennsylvania
- County: Cumberland

Government
  - Type: Board of Commissioners
  - President: Scott Dardick
  - Vice President: Amy Elizabeth Gish
  - Commissioner: Wayne Melnick
  - Commissioner: John Kuntzelman
  - Commissioner: George Tyson

Area
  - Total: 10.80 sq mi (27.97 km^{2})
  - Land: 10.49 sq mi (27.16 km^{2})
  - Water: 0.31 sq mi (0.81 km^{2})

Population (2020)
  - Total: 20,905 ▲
  - Estimate (2023): 21,178
  - Density: 2,062.6/sq mi (796.37/km^{2})
- Time zone: UTC-5 (Eastern (EST))
  - Summer (DST): UTC-4 (EDT)
- Area code: 717
- FIPS code: 42-041-21680
- Website: www.eastpennsboro.net

Historical population
Census	Pop.	Note	%±
2000	18,254		—
2010	20,228		10.8%
2020	20,905		3.3%
2023 (est.)	21,178		1.3%
U.S. Decennial Census

East Pennsboro Township is a township in Cumberland County, Pennsylvania, United States. The population was 20,905 at the 2020 census, up from 20,228 at the 2010 census. East Pennsboro is the second most populous municipality in Cumberland County, after neighboring Hampden Township. East Pennsboro is located along the western banks of the Susquehanna River, across from Harrisburg. There are many large corporations based in East Pennsboro Township that use the Camp Hill postal address, including the Rite Aid Corporation and Gannett Fleming.

== Geography ==
The township is in the northeast corner of Cumberland County, bordered to the east by the Susquehanna River, which separates it from Dauphin County. The township's natural northern boundary is the crest of Blue Mountain, which separates it from Perry County. U.S. Route 11/U.S. Route 15 parallels the Susquehanna as the main north-to-south route in the township, and east-to-west Pennsylvania Route 944 meets it in West Fairview. Interstate 81 crosses its northern tier and interchanges with US 11/US 15 in Summerdale. Other local roads of note are Center Street/East Penn Drive, North Enola Drive, Salt Road, and Valley Road. Conodoguinet Creek makes several large bends across the southern part of the township before entering the Susquehanna between West Fairview and Wormleysburg.

According to the United States Census Bureau, the township has a total area of 10.7 square miles (27.7 km^{2}), of which 10.4 square miles (26.9 km^{2}) is land and 0.3 square miles (0.8 km^{2}), or 2.90%, is water.

Unincorporated communities and census-designated places in East Pennsboro Township:

- Enola
- Summerdale
- West Enola
- West Fairview

=== Neighboring municipalities ===
- Hampden Township (west)
- Camp Hill (south)
- Lemoyne (southeast)
- Wormleysburg (southeast)
- Harrisburg, Dauphin County (east)
- Susquehanna Township, Dauphin County (northeast)
- Marysville, Perry County (north)
- Rye Township, Perry County (north)

=== Climate ===
East Pennsboro has a hot-summer humid continental climate (Dfa) and the hardiness zones are 7a and 6b. Average monthly temperatures in West Fairview range from 30.2 °F in January to 75.2 °F in July. The average annual absolute minimum temperature in West Fairview is 0.3 °F.

== Demographics ==
As of the census of 2000, there were 18,254 people, 7,475 households, and 4,970 families residing in the township. The population density was 1,673.9 inhabitants per square mile (646.3/km^{2}). There were 7,804 housing units at an average density of 715.6 units per square mile (276.3 units/km^{2}). The racial makeup of the township was 93.74% White, 1.47% African American, 0.14% Native American, 2.53% Asian, 0.03% Pacific Islander, 0.64% from other races, and 1.46% from two or more races. Hispanic or Latino of any race were 1.54% of the population.

There were 7,475 households, out of which 29.5% had children under the age of 18 living with them, 53.7% were married couples living together, 9.4% had a female householder with no husband present, and 33.5% were non-families. 27.8% of all households were made up of individuals, and 10.3% had someone living alone who was 65 years of age or older. The average household size was 2.38 and the average family size was 2.91.

In the township the population was spread out, with 22.7% under the age of 18, 8.1% from 18 to 24, 31.5% from 25 to 44, 24.1% from 45 to 64, and 13.5% who were 65 years of age or older. The median age was 38 years. For every 100 females, there were 90.6 males. For every 100 females age 18 and over, there were 87.7 males.

The median income for a household in the township was $44,473, and the median income for a family was $54,142. Males had a median income of $36,732 versus $27,542 for females. The per capita income for the township was $22,517. About 3.9% of families and 6.7% of the population were below the poverty line, including 7.3% of those under age 18 and 9.6% of those age 65 or over.

== Economy ==
Prior to 2022, Rite Aid had its headquarters in the township.

== Education ==
East Pennsboro Township is served by the East Pennsboro Area School District. In addition, the Central Penn College is located in East Pennsboro Township.

== Culture ==
=== Events ===
Annually, the township hosts a fair called Pumpkinfest in the fall.
