= Mickey Shuler =

American football player (born 1956)

No. 82, 85
- Position: Tight end

Personal information
- Born: August 21, 1956 (age 70); Harrisburg, Pennsylvania, U.S.
- Listed height: 6 ft 3 in (1.91 m)
- Listed weight: 232 lb (105 kg)

Career information
- High school: East Pennsboro (PA)
- College: Penn State
- NFL draft: 1978: 3rd round, 61st overall pick

Career history
- New York Jets (1978–1989); Philadelphia Eagles (1990–1991)

Awards and highlights
- Second-team All-Pro (1988); 2× Pro Bowl (1986, 1988); New York Jets All-Time Four Decade Team; Second-team All-American (1977); First-team All-East (1977)

Career NFL statistics
- Receptions: 462
- Receiving yards: 5,100
- Receiving touchdowns: 37
- Stats at Pro Football Reference

Mickey Charles Shuler Sr. (born August 21, 1956) is an American former professional football player who was a tight end in the National Football League (NFL) from 1978 to 1991. He played in 181 games over 14 seasons in the NFL for the New York Jets and the Philadelphia Eagles. He played college football at Penn State University from 1975 to 1977, where his son Mickey Shuler, Jr., also a tight end, played.

== Early life ==
Shuler was born in Harrisburg, Pennsylvania. He was a multi-sport star at East Pennsboro High School in Enola, Pennsylvania, where he was also recruited by legendary college basketball coaches Dean Smith and Bobby Knight.

== College career ==
At Penn State, Shuler was an All-American and a three-year letterman, playing in the Gator, Sugar, Fiesta, Hula and Japan Bowls.

He earned a Bachelor of Science in physical education at Penn State in 1979.

== Professional career ==
A third-round pick (#61 overall) in 1978 NFL draft by the New York Jets for whom he would play for 12 seasons. The 6' 3", 230-pound Shuler had seven playoff appearances and two Pro Bowl appearances (1986, 1988). He was named as the tight end for the Jets All Time Team and the Jets Dream Team.

For his career, Shuler totaled 462 receptions for 5,100 yards and 37 touchdowns. He is tied for third in all time receptions for the Jets. He is also second in most consecutive games with a reception (86 games) and second in most touchdowns in a game (three).

== NFL career statistics ==
Legend
**Bold**	Career high

=== Regular season ===
Year	Team	Games		Receiving				
Year	Team	GP	GS	Rec	Yds	Avg	Lng	TD
1978	NYJ	**16**	1	11	67	6.1	15	3
1979	NYJ	**16**	6	16	225	14.1	46	3
1980	NYJ	**16**	9	22	226	10.3	26	2
1981	NYJ	6	0	0	0	0.0	0	0
1982	NYJ	9	3	8	132	**16.5**	**51**	3
1983	NYJ	**16**	6	26	272	10.5	28	1
1984	NYJ	**16**	**16**	68	782	11.5	49	6
1985	NYJ	**16**	13	**76**	**879**	11.6	35	**7**
1986	NYJ	**16**	**16**	69	675	9.8	36	4
1987	NYJ	11	10	43	434	10.1	32	3
1988	NYJ	15	15	70	805	11.5	42	5
1989	NYJ	7	7	29	322	11.1	22	0
1990	PHI	**16**	5	18	190	10.6	25	0
1991	PHI	4	0	6	91	15.2	21	0
Career		180	107	462	5,100	11.0	51	37

=== Playoffs ===
Year	Team	Games		Receiving				
Year	Team	GP	GS	Rec	Yds	Avg	Lng	TD
1981	NYJ	1	0	6	**116**	**19.3**	**30**	**1**
1982	NYJ	**3**	1	1	9	9.0	9	0
1985	NYJ	1	1	5	53	10.6	21	**1**
1986	NYJ	2	**2**	**8**	71	8.9	16	0
1990	PHI	1	1	0	0	0.0	0	0
Career		8	5	20	249	12.5	30	2

== Personal life ==
Today, Shuler is very active in community service with many organizations, such as the New York Governor's Council on Drugs and Alcohol, the Pennsylvania Governor's Council on Physical Fitness, the Long Island chapter of the United Way, The Salvation Army, the Long Island and Pennsylvania chapters of the American Heart Association, Athletes Against Drugs and Alcohol, and Big Brothers Big Sisters of America,

He is currently the co-host of the Sports Channel weekly Jets TV Show and board member of CCNB Bank and is a member and inductee of the Pennsylvania Sports Hall of Fame. He lives in Enola, Pennsylvania, with his wife, Susan.

Shuler's son, Mickey Shuler, Jr., was a starting tight end at Penn State and was drafted by the Minnesota Vikings in the seventh round of the 2010 NFL draft, and played for the Miami Dolphins. He has also played for the Oakland Raiders, Buffalo Bills, Arizona Cardinals, Atlanta Falcons, and Jacksonville Jaguars.
