= Mickey Shuler Jr. =

American football player (born 1986)

Mickey Shuler
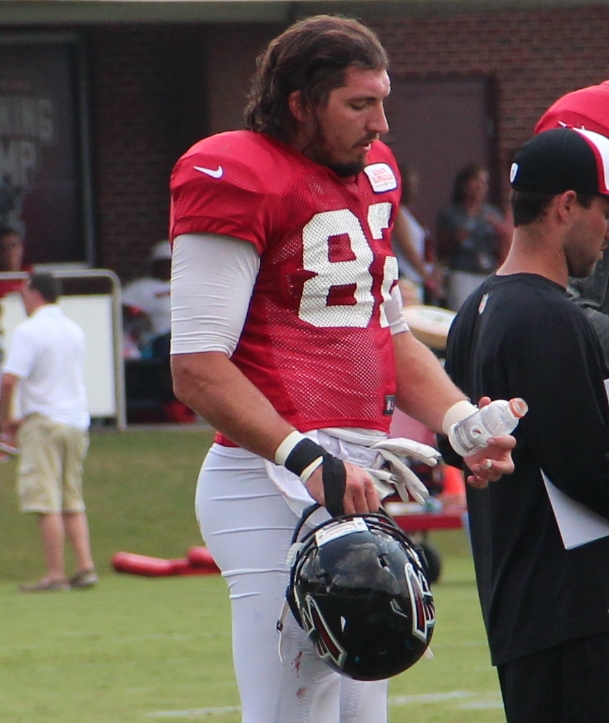
- Shuler with the Atlanta Falcons in 2014

No. 81, 82, 86
- Position: Tight end

Personal information
- Born: October 9, 1986 (age 40); Lido Beach, New York, U.S.
- Listed height: 6 ft 4 in (1.93 m)
- Listed weight: 247 lb (112 kg)

Career information
- High school: East Pennsboro (Enola, Pennsylvania)
- College: Penn State
- NFL draft: 2010: 7th round, 214th overall pick

Career history
- Minnesota Vikings (2010); Miami Dolphins (2010); Cincinnati Bengals (2011)*; Minnesota Vikings (2011); Oakland Raiders (2012–2013)*; Buffalo Bills (2013)*; Arizona Cardinals (2013)*; Atlanta Falcons (2013–2014)*; Jacksonville Jaguars (2014); Atlanta Falcons (2015)
- * Offseason or practice squad member only

Career NFL statistics
- Receptions: 2
- Receiving yards: 44
- Stats at Pro Football Reference

Mickey Charles Shuler Jr. (born October 9, 1986) is an American former professional football player who was a tight end in the National Football League (NFL). He played college football for the Penn State Nittany Lions. He is the son of former New York Jets All-Pro tight end Mickey Shuler.

== Early life ==
He attended East Pennsboro High School in Enola, Pennsylvania. As a junior, he made 40 catches for 562 yards and seven touchdowns. As a senior, he caught 40 passes for 564 yards and three scores and was selected team MVP.

== College career ==
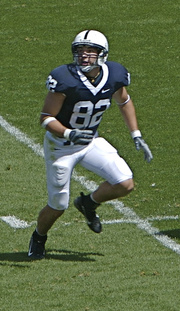
Shuler with the Nittany Lions in 2007.

Shuler scored a 17-yard touchdown on his first collegiate reception, which came in Penn State's the 2007 season-opener against Florida International. He finished that game with four receptions for 54 yards. Playing in every game on offense and special teams in 2007, with three starts.

Shuler's father, Mickey Shuler Sr., was a standout tight end at Penn State, lettering from 1975 to 1977 before embarking on a 14-year career in the National Football League.

== Professional career ==
=== Minnesota Vikings (first stint) ===
Shuler was selected in the seventh round of the 2010 NFL draft (214th overall) by the Minnesota Vikings. After scoring a touchdown in the first pre-season game, Shuler made the final cut and was part of the 53-man roster for the first two weeks of the season. On September 22, 2010, Shuler was cut and placed on waivers to make room for wide-receiver Hank Baskett, and was subsequently claimed by the Miami Dolphins.

=== Miami Dolphins ===
On September 23, 2010, Shuler was claimed off waivers by the Miami Dolphins and made his first appearance as a pro in Week 4 versus the New England Patriots. He made his first NFL reception in Miami's Week 16 loss to the Detroit Lions, December 26, 2010. He was waived on September 3, 2011, and was claimed off waivers by the Cincinnati Bengals on September 4, but failed his physical.

=== Minnesota Vikings (second stint) ===
Shuler was signed to the Vikings' practice squad on November 29, 2011. He was promoted to the 53-man roster from the practice squad on December 26, 2011. On August 31, 2012, as the Vikings reduced their roster down to league maximum of 53 players, he was released.

=== Oakland Raiders ===
Shuler was signed to the Oakland Raiders practice squad on October 16, 2012.

=== Buffalo Bills ===
Shuler was claimed off waivers by the Buffalo Bills on May 14, 2013. He was released by the Bills on July 27, 2013.

=== Arizona Cardinals ===
On July 28, 2013, Shuler was claimed off waivers by the Arizona Cardinals. Shuler was released by the Cardinals on August 27, 2013.

=== Atlanta Falcons (first stint) ===
Shuler was signed to the Atlanta Falcons practice squad on September 1, 2013. He was waived August 30, 2014.

=== Jacksonville Jaguars ===
On August 31, 2014, he was claimed off waivers by the Jacksonville Jaguars. He was released on October 4 after being hospitalized for an illness and signed to the team's practice squad on October 7. He became a free agent after the 2014 season.

=== Atlanta Falcons (second stint) ===
Shuler was signed to the Atlanta Falcons future reserve contract on January 1, 2015. He was released on August 30, 2015. Shuler was re-signed by the Falcons on September 29, 2015. On October 6, 2015, he was released by the Falcons.
