= West Fairview, Pennsylvania =

Unincorporated community in Pennsylvania, US

- Census-designated place
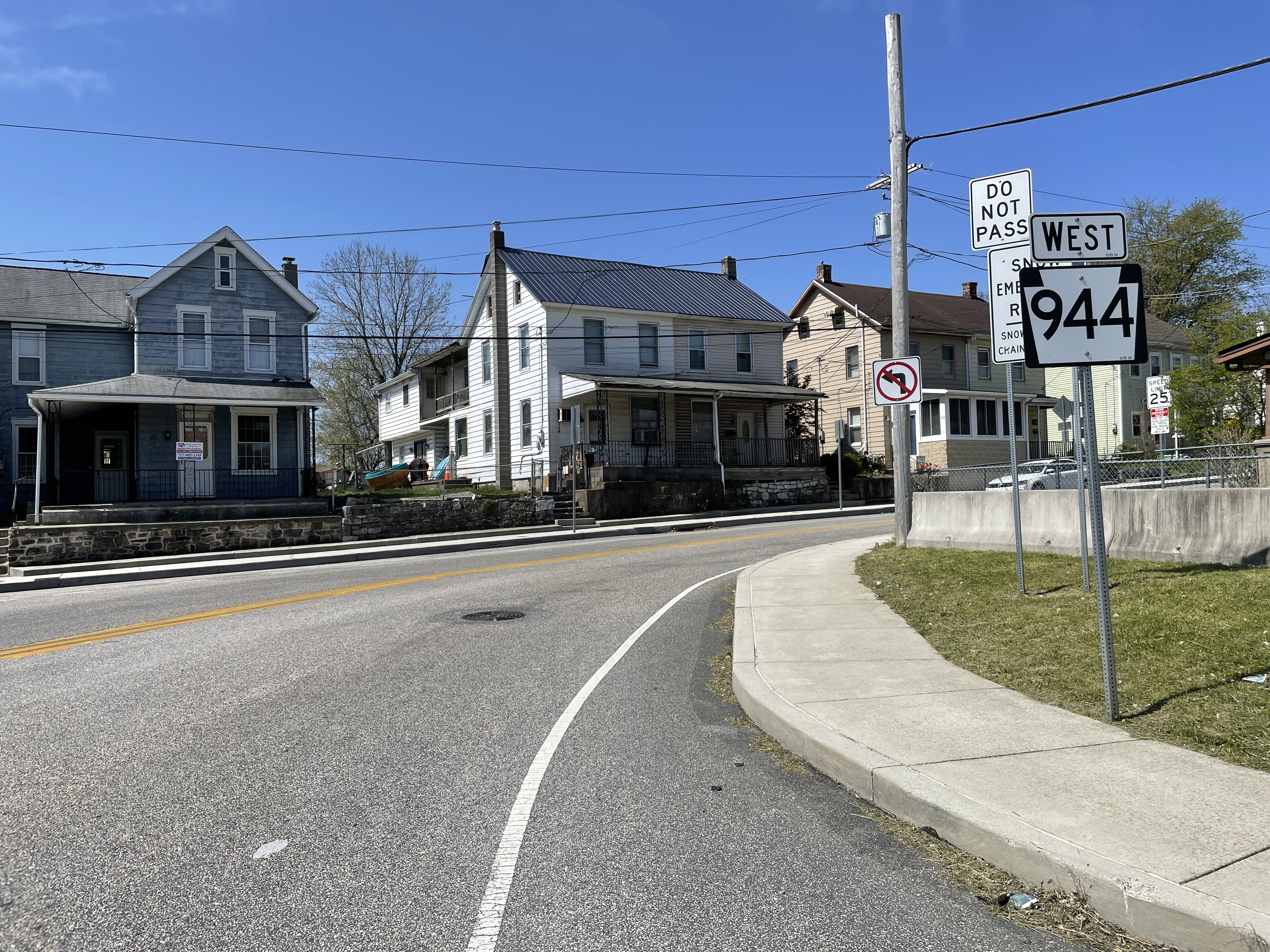
- State Street & Enola Road, West Fairview

- Location within the U.S. state of Pennsylvania West Fairview (the United States)
- Coordinates: 40°16′25″N 76°54′59″W
- Country: United States
- State: Pennsylvania
- County: Cumberland
- Township: East Pennsboro

Area
  - Total: 0.34 sq mi (0.87 km^{2})
  - Land: 0.32 sq mi (0.83 km^{2})
  - Water: 0.012 sq mi (0.03 km^{2})
- Elevation: 360 ft (110 m)

Population (2020)
  - Total: 1,138
- Time zone: UTC-5 (Eastern (EST))
  - Summer (DST): UTC-4 (EDT)
- ZIP codes: 17025 (Enola)
- Area codes: 717 and 223
- FIPS code: 42-82920
- GNIS feature ID: 1191019

West Fairview, formerly a borough, is now a census-designated place (CDP) located at the confluence of the Susquehanna River and the Conodoguinet Creek in East Pennsboro Township, Pennsylvania, United States. As of the 2020 census, the village had a population of 1,138.

== Geography ==
West Fairview is located on the eastern edge of Cumberland County and East Pennsboro Township at 40.273538° North, 76.916346° West (40.273538, -76.916346). It is on the west shore of the Susquehanna River facing Harrisburg, the state capital. It occupies a hilly peninsula of land between the Susquehanna to the east and Conodoguinet Creek to the south and west. U.S. Route 11/U.S. Route 15 runs north-to-south through West Fairview, and Route 944 has its eastern terminus there on US 11/US 15.

According to the United States Census Bureau, West Fairview has a total area of 0.34 square miles (0.87 km^{2}), of which 0.32 square miles (0.83 km^{2}) is land and 0.01 square miles (0.03 km^{2}), or 3.76%, is water.

== History ==
West Fairview is the oldest village of East Pennsboro Township. First acquired as a farm by Abraham Neidigh in 1802, by 1815 he subdivided lots into the town called Fairview to sell to builders. Harrisburg businessmen Norman Callendar, J.S. and B.J. Weistling purchased a 25-acre lot in 1830 to construct a mill on the Conodoguinet Creek. Deed records suggest that by around 1842 the town was renamed West Fairview. The merger of the former borough with East Pennsboro Township in 1998 was spearheaded by Mr. & Mrs. Leonard A. Portzline of West Fairview. The couple and other citizens were interested in the pursuit of greater cost-effectiveness, efficiency, and improvement in the delivery of local governmental services. The merger has become a model used by other communities across the state.

== Education ==
It is in the East Pennsboro Area School District.

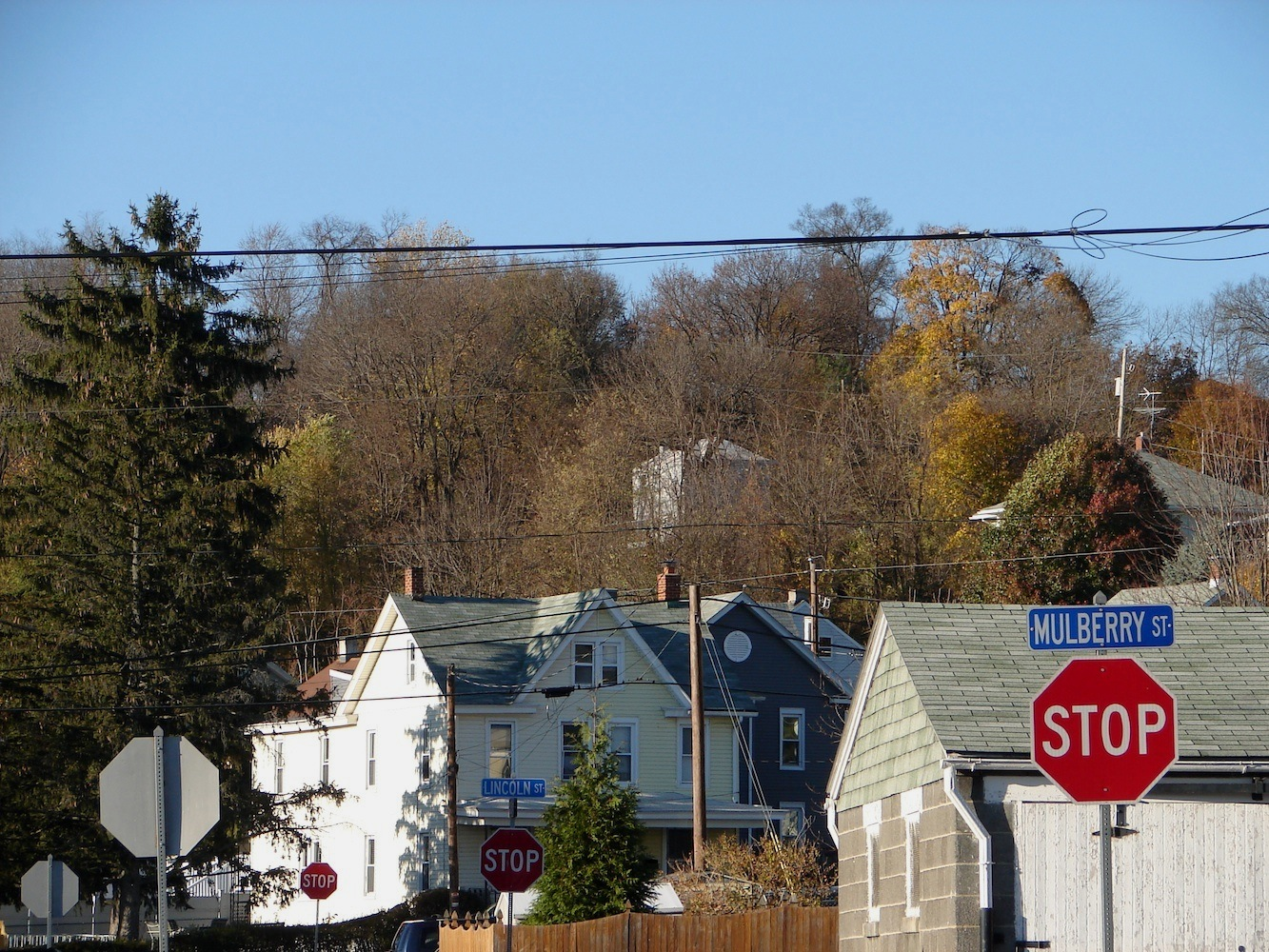
An alley in the town
