= Rockville Bridge =

Bridge in Pennsylvania

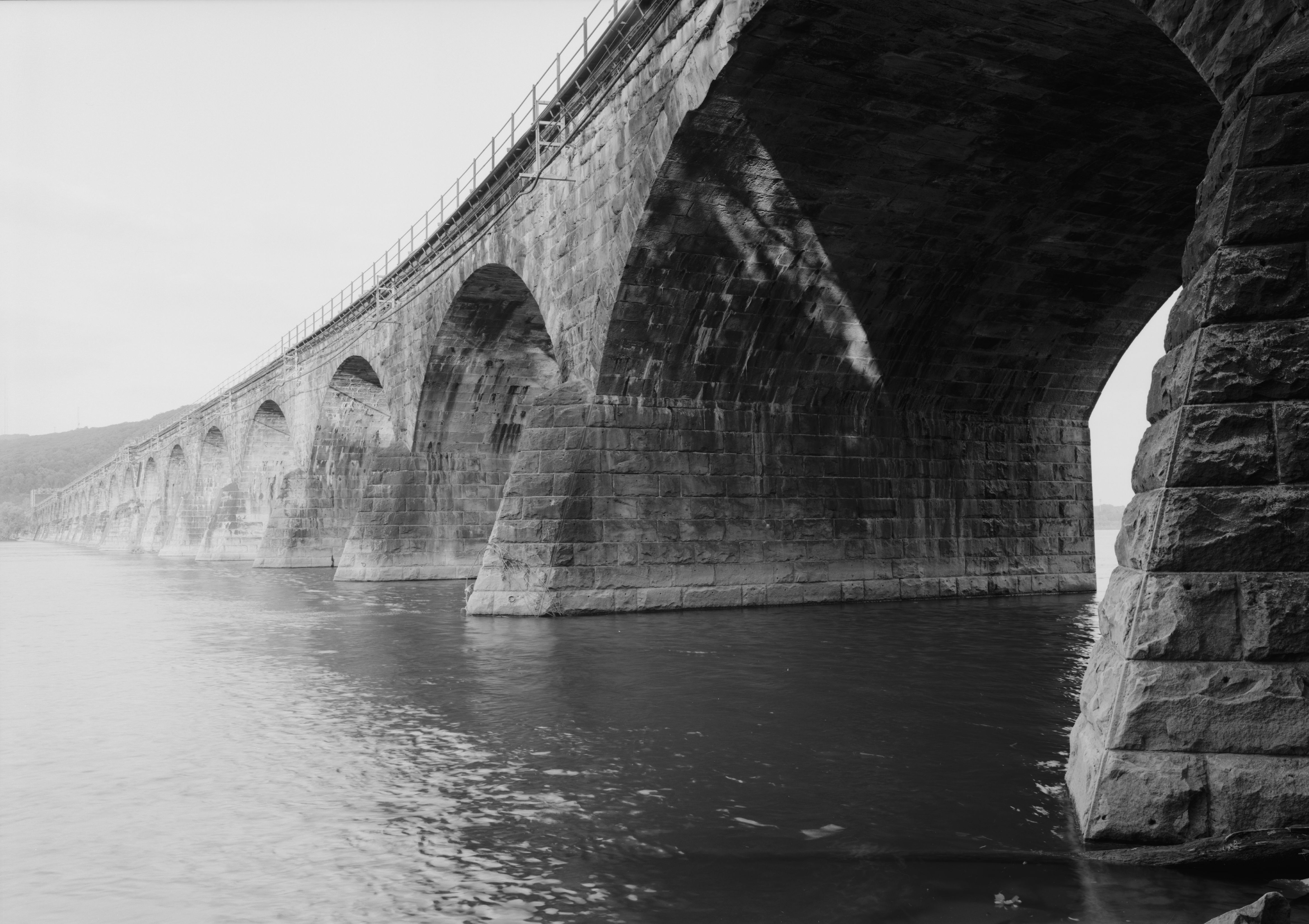
- Rockville Bridge in 1999
- Coordinates: 40.3334°N 76.9103°W
- Carries: 2 rail lines for Norfolk Southern Railway and Amtrak Pennsylvanian
- Crosses: Susquehanna River
- Locale: Just south of Marysville, Pennsylvania
- Maintained by: Norfolk Southern Railway

Characteristics
- Design: Stone masonry arch bridge
- Total length: 3,820 feet (1,164 m)
- Width: 52 feet (16 m)
- Longest span: 70 feet (21 m) (48 equal spans)
- Clearance below: 43 feet (13 m) to avg. level of rock bottom

History
- Opened: March 30, 1902

Pennsylvania Historical Marker
- Designated: April 29, 2010

Location
- Interactive map of Rockville Bridge

The Rockville Bridge is the longest stone masonry arch railroad viaduct ever built, at 3,820 feet (1,160 m). It has 48 70-foot spans.

The bridge crosses the Susquehanna River about 2 miles (3 km) north of Harrisburg, Pennsylvania, United States. The eastern end is located in Rockville and the western end is in Marysville.

Completed in 1902 by the Pennsylvania Railroad (PRR), it remains in use today by the Norfolk Southern Railway and Amtrak's Pennsylvanian route.

The bridge was listed on the National Register of Historic Places in 1975 and was designated as a National Historic Civil Engineering Landmark in 1979.

== History ==
The first bridge erected at this site was a one-track wooden truss built by the PRR and opened on September 1, 1849. The Northern Central Railway began to use it after abandoning its Marysville Bridge.

It was replaced in 1877 with a double-track iron truss bridge.

The third and current bridge was built between April 1900 and March 1902 by Drake & Stratton Co., which erected the eastern half, and H.S. Kerbaugh, working from the west. The laborers included men of Italian heritage and local residents.

Control of the bridge passed to Penn Central after the PRR merger in 1968, then to Conrail and finally the Norfolk Southern.

For most of its life, the bridge carried four main line tracks, which were reduced to three during the 1980s when the former PRR Main Line was modernized across Pennsylvania.

In the late 1990s, an intermodal container was blown off an intermodal freight train and landed in the river, prompting Norfolk Southern to stop using the wye track to Enola at the west end of the bridge. This reduced the number of main line tracks to two, but left a buffer zone on either side to prevent further containers ending up in the river, although high winds from the departing December 2010 North American blizzard sent another overboard on December 27, 2010.

The track from the west side of the bridge was shortened to a new control point named "Mary" because the curve in the switch at the former location caused lateral forces to blow out the side of the spandrel. This led to the failure of the downriver side under the weight of a coal train. When the spandrel failed, it also disproved the once-popular thought that the core of the bridge was filled with concrete.

During high winds, it is routine to park heavy trains on the bridge as a wind shield.

Currently, the bridge is used by the Norfolk Southern Railway and Amtrak.

On July 7, 2026, Union Pacific Big Boy No. 4014, the largest and heaviest steam locomotive still in operation, crossed the bridge on its coast-to-coast heritage excursion with Union Pacific and Norfolk Southern units and passenger coaches in tow.

== See also ==
- List of bridges documented by the Historic American Engineering Record in Pennsylvania
- List of crossings of the Susquehanna River

== Gallery ==
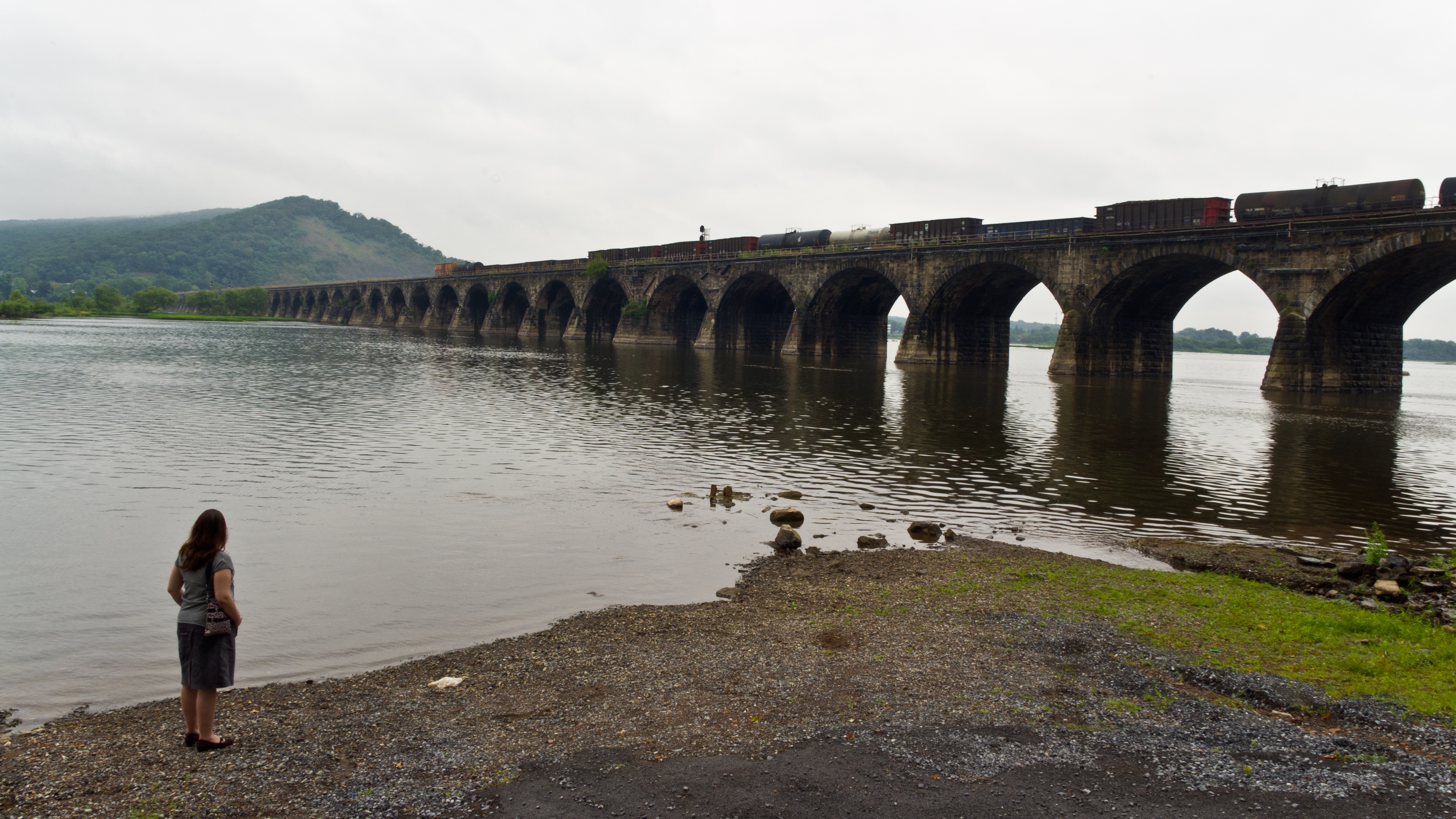
Looking west from Susquehanna Township

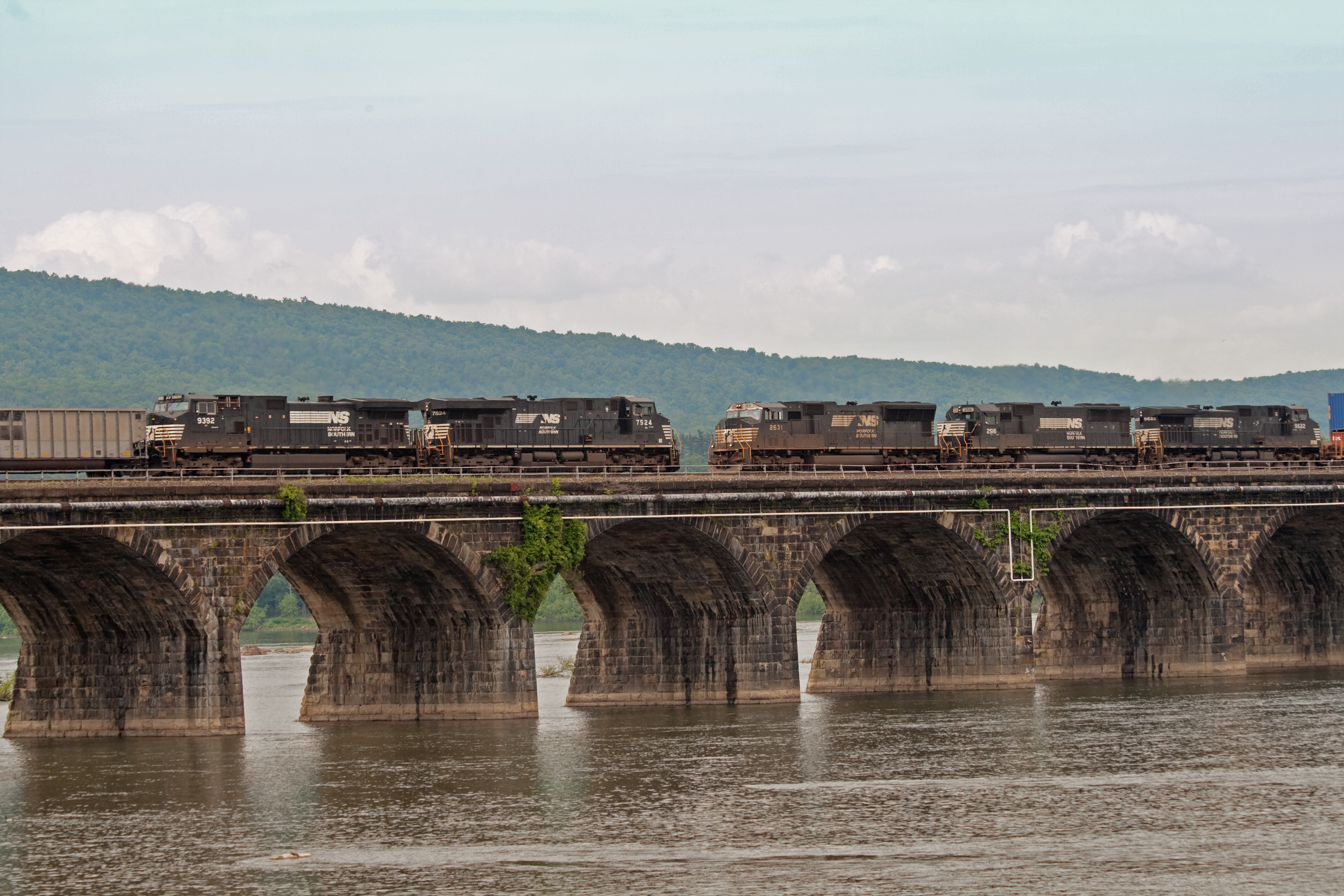
Two Norfolk Southern freight trains meet on the Rockville Bridge
