= Lucknow, Pennsylvania =

Unincorporated community in Pennsylvania, US

- Unincorporated community
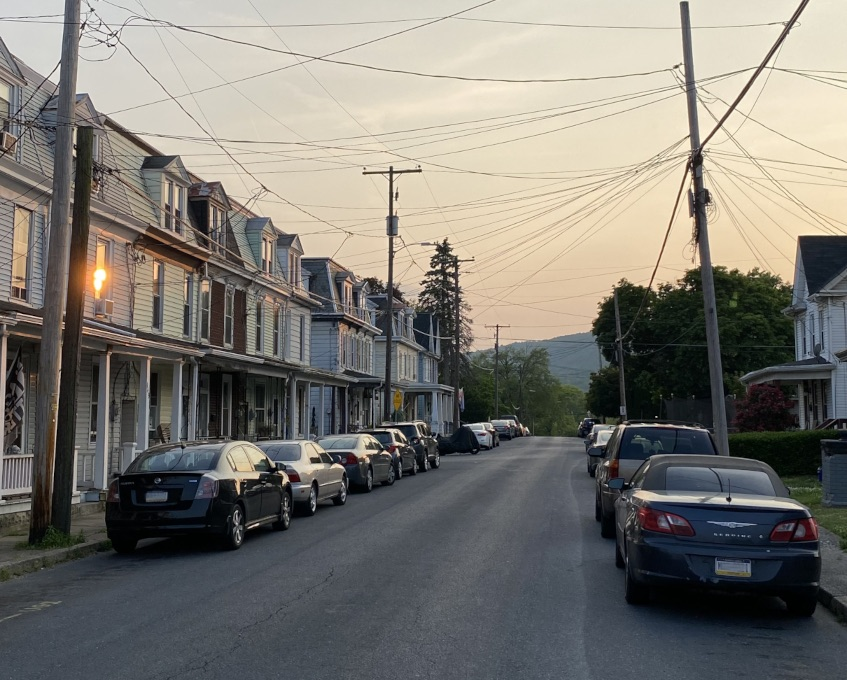
- Housing stock on Lucknow Road in Lucknow, PA, looking west toward the Susquehanna River
- Interactive map of Lucknow, Pennsylvania
- Coordinates: 40.32214°N 76.89579°W
- Country: United States
- State: Pennsylvania
- County: Dauphin
- Township: Susquehanna
- Time zone: UTC-5 (Eastern (EST))
  - Summer (DST): UTC-4 (EDT)
- Area codes: 717 and 223

Lucknow is an unincorporated American community and neighborhood that is located in Susquehanna Township, Dauphin County, Pennsylvania, United States, in the Harrisburg-Carlisle area.

== Geography ==
Lucknow is roughly bounded to the north by Rockville and Blue Ridge Road in upper Susquehanna Township; east to Fargreen Road, west along Linglestown Road straddling the Harrisburg/Susquehanna Township line, south to Lucknow Road, east to the Harrisburg Intermodal Yard along North Sixth Street and west to Front Street. Linglestown Road passes through the heart of the community.

== History ==
The area was named after Lucknow, Uttar Pradesh, India where the Indian Rebellion of 1857 took place between Indian freedom fighters and the East India Company army. Lucknow takes the name of "Sepoy" which refers to the Indian foot soldiers who fought on the British side in the Relief of Lucknow.

John W. Reily (of soon-to-be prominent Reily family) worked in the iron industry and built and operated the Lucknow Forge for approximately 35 years. The housing stock of rowhouses along Lucknow Road were first built as company homes for those working at the Lucknow Forge. Late in the 19th century, Reily moved to work on a dairy farm at Fort Hunter and sold the forge to the Pennsylvania Railroad as the site of a rail welding plant next for their expanding rail yard. This new rail yard was known as the Lucknow Yard, though presently remains as the Harrisburg Intermodal Yard. The Pennsylvania Railroad would also operate a passenger station at Lucknow, approximately 4 miles north of Harrisburg.
