= East Pennsboro High School =

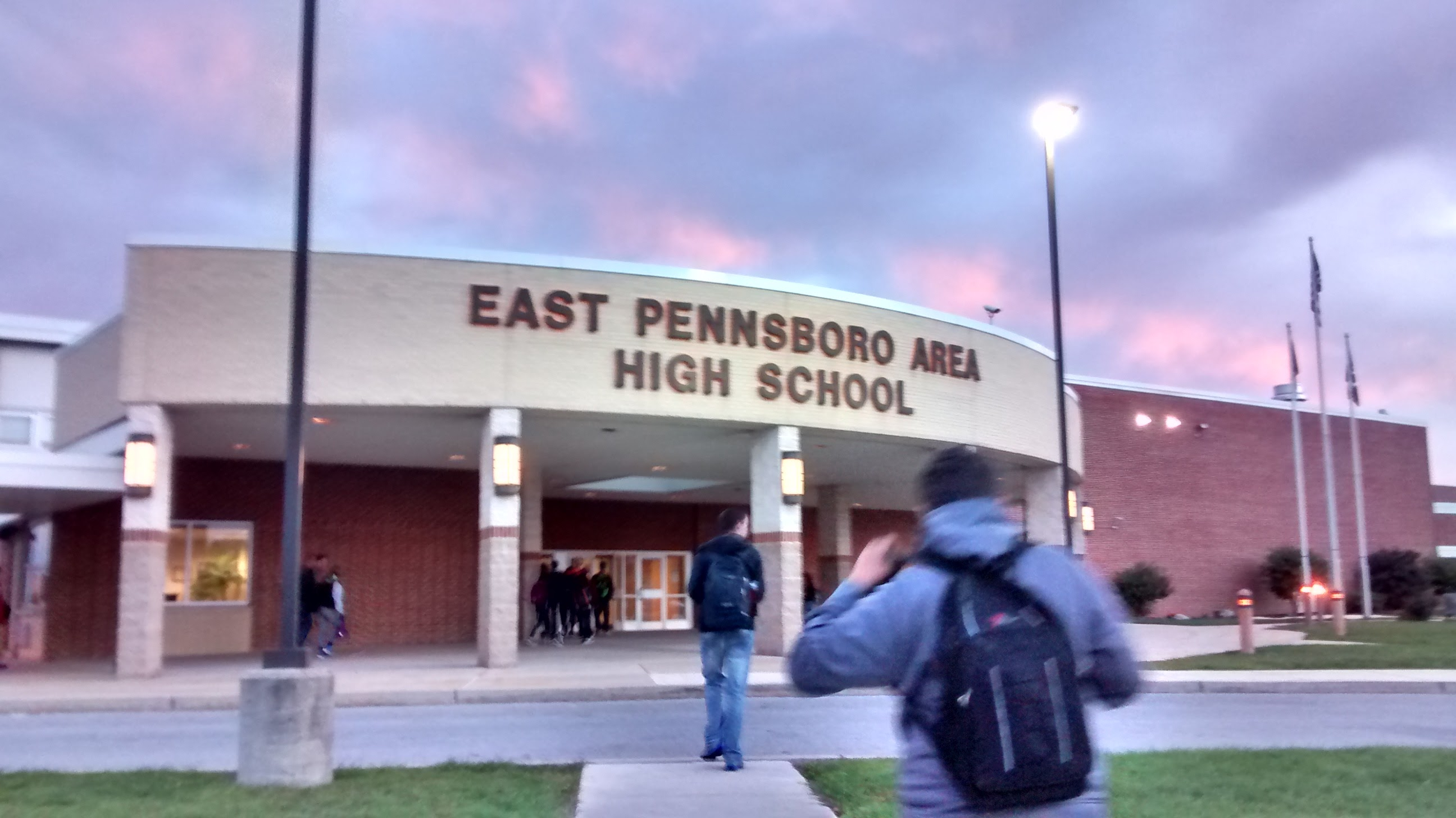

Location
- East Pennsboro Township, Pennsylvania; United States; 40.297°N 76.941°W

Information
- Type: Public
- Motto: Know each student's name, face, and personal story in order to deliver meaningful educational experiences.
- School district: East Pennsboro Area School District
- Principal: Dr. Timothy Bianchi
- Faculty: 67 teachers (2012)
- Teaching staff: 54.77 (FTE)
- Grades: 9–12
- Enrollment: 779 (2024–2025)
- Student to teacher ratio: 14.22
- Campus type: Suburban
- Colors: Orange and black
- Mascot: Panther
- Newspaper: Panther Press http://pantherpress.org
- Feeder schools: East Pennsboro Area Middle School
- Website: www.epasd.org

East Pennsboro Area High School is a midsized, suburban, public high school that serves East Pennsboro Township, Pennsylvania. The School is located at 425 West Shady Lane, Enola in Cumberland County, Pennsylvania. It is part of the East Pennsboro Area School District (EPASD). In the 2022–2023 school year, the School's enrollment was reported as 761 pupils in 9th through 12th grades.

East Pennsboro Area High School is served by the Capital Area Intermediate Unit 15 which offers a variety of services, including a completely developed K-12 curriculum that is mapped and aligned with the Pennsylvania Academic Standards (available online), shared services, a group purchasing program and a wide variety of special education and special needs services.

== Notable alumni ==
- Anil Dash, blogger, entrepreneur, technologist
- Mickey Shuler, football player
- Mickey Shuler Jr., football player
- Dave Sunday, Pennsylvania Attorney General
