= Summerdale, Pennsylvania =

Unincorporated community in Pennsylvania, US

- Unincorporated community
- Location within the U.S. state of Pennsylvania Summerdale (the United States)
- Coordinates: 40°17′37″N 76°55′35″W
- Country: United States
- State: Pennsylvania
- County: Cumberland
- Township: East Pennsboro

Area
  - Total: 0.12 sq mi (0.3 km^{2})
  - Land: 0.12 sq mi (0.3 km^{2})
- Time zone: UTC-5 (Eastern (EST))
  - Summer (DST): UTC-4 (EDT)
- ZIP codes: 17093
- Area code: 717
- GNIS feature ID: 1189024

Summerdale is an unincorporated community located in East Pennsboro Township, Cumberland County, Pennsylvania, United States. As of 2020, the community had an estimated population of 705. Central Pennsylvania College and the Capital Area Intermediate Unit are located in Summerdale. It is part of the Harrisburg–Carlisle Metropolitan Statistical Area.

== Geography ==
Summerdale is located at 40°18'41" North, 76°55'54" West, on the west side of U.S. Route 11/15 and the south side of Interstate 81. These two highways interchange just north of Summerdale.

Summerdale was laid out by Harry Horner in 1909 out of a 115-acre parcel of land. As people from Harrisburg came over the river by trolley during the summers, a dance hall was erected in 1910.

In 2009, Summerdale held a Centennial Celebration. There was a parade, games, and a year-long celebration dedicated to the small town of Summerdale.
