= Enola, Pennsylvania =

Unincorporated community in Pennsylvania, US

- Census-designated place
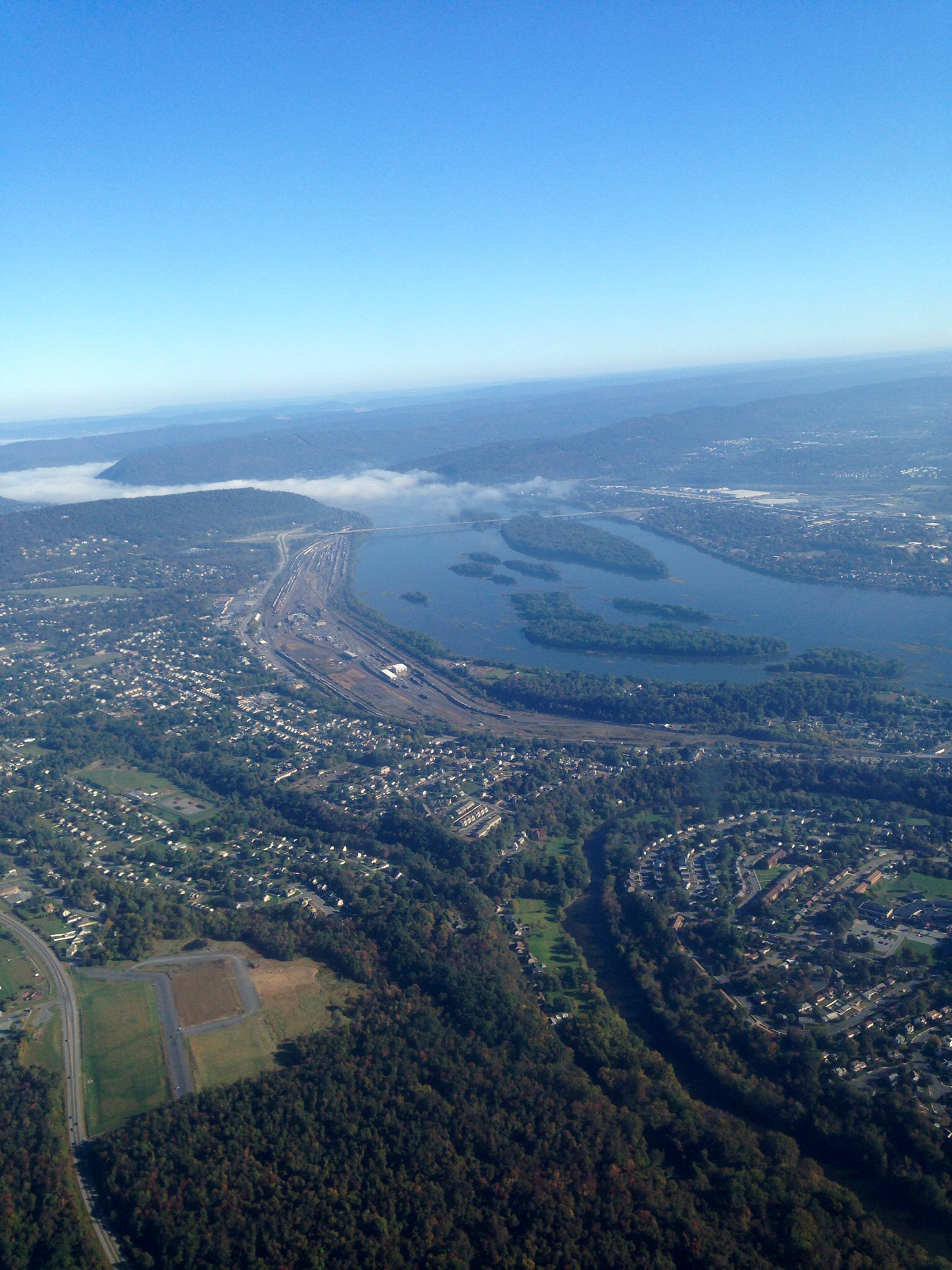
- Aerial view of Enola and the Susquehanna River

- Location within Pennsylvania Location within the United States
- Coordinates: 40°17′24″N 76°56′1″W
- Country: United States
- State: Pennsylvania
- County: Cumberland
- Township: East Pennsboro
- Established: 1905

Area
  - Total: 1.62 sq mi (4.20 km^{2})
  - Land: 1.61 sq mi (4.17 km^{2})
  - Water: 0.012 sq mi (0.03 km^{2})
- Elevation: 450 ft (140 m)

Population (2020)
  - Total: 6,103
  - Density: 3,792.3/sq mi (1,464.22/km^{2})
- Time zone: UTC-5 (Eastern (EST))
  - Summer (DST): UTC-4 (EDT)
- ZIP Code: 17025
- Area code: 717
- FIPS code: 42-23744

Enola is a census-designated place (CDP) located along the Susquehanna River in East Pennsboro Township, Cumberland County, Pennsylvania, United States. The population was 6,111 at the 2010 census. Norfolk Southern operates Enola Yard, a large rail yard and locomotive shop in Enola. It is situated in Cumberland County, directly across the Susquehanna River from Harrisburg and is part of the Harrisburg–Carlisle metropolitan statistical area.

== History ==
The town came into existence due to the building of rail lines through the area. Local farmers Francis and Wesley Miller sold 2 acres (0.81 ha) to the Pennsylvania Railroad to be used as a flag station. Mr. Miller was given the honor of naming the train station. He named the station "Enola", after his daughter. Miller at the time was the only resident living in the area. Eventually, when more people moved to the area the local post office and surrounding town adopted the name as well.

In the fall of 1902, the Pennsylvania Railroad made the decision to build a classification yard "between Marysville, Pennsylvania and West Fairview, Pennsylvania, Enola Yard." In 1903, their agent, the Manor Realty Co. purchasing 743 acres (301 ha), officially opened the yards in January 1905. Of the 743 acres, the Enola Realty Co. bought 104 acres (42 ha) for $26,500. This would officially become known as Enola (or current North Enola).

Starting in 1909, the Realty Company went on to build more than 220 homes which it rented or sold to families coming to the village looking for employment.

South Enola grew almost as rapidly as North Enola. Some of the landowners were Mann, Bretz, Darr, Ruplay, Pyne, and Addams.

West Enola also grew with the boom of the Enola Yards. The largest landowner of that time was Britton. Other large landowners were Lantz and Renninger.

Enola is served by a single high school, East Pennsboro High School. Originally named Enola High School, it was built on farmland which had been owned by the Gutshall family from the late 1800s until the 1940s. It is located at 425 West Shady Lane, parallel to Gutshall Road. The original Enola High School is located on 98 South Enola Drive. It is the home of the East Pennsboro Branch Library, township offices and the East Pennsboro Township Police department. An early elementary school is located at 126 N. Enola Drive. That property was sold and now houses several businesses.

== Geography ==
Enola is located near the eastern edge of Cumberland County at 40°17′25″N 76°56′04″W. According to the United States Census Bureau, the CDP has a total area of 1.91 square miles (4.94 km^{2}), of which 1.89 square miles (4.89 km^{2}) is land and 0.02 square miles (0.05 km^{2}), or 1.04%, is water.

It is on the west shore of the Susquehanna River facing the city of Harrisburg. U.S. Route 11/15 runs north-to-south through Enola.

== Demographics ==
Historical population
Census	Pop.	Note	%±
2020	6,103		—
U.S. Decennial Census

== Education ==
East Pennsboro Area School District serves as the public education center for Enola. The district consists of four schools: East Pennsboro Area High School, East Pennsboro Area Middle School, East Pennsboro Elementary School, and West Creek Hills Elementary School with a total enrollment of about 2,900 students.

== Notable people ==
- Billy Myers, infielder, drove in Game 7-winning run of 1940 World Series
- Lynn Myers, Major League Baseball player, brother of Billy Myers
- Betty Warfel, pitcher and infielder, played for Rockford Peaches
- George W. Fisher, first Yard Master of the newly built Enola Yard, then the largest freight yard in the world. He was an employee of the Pennsylvania Railroad when he, his wife, and eight children moved from Philadelphia to Enola in 1906 for him to assume his new position.
