= Henry C. Warfel =

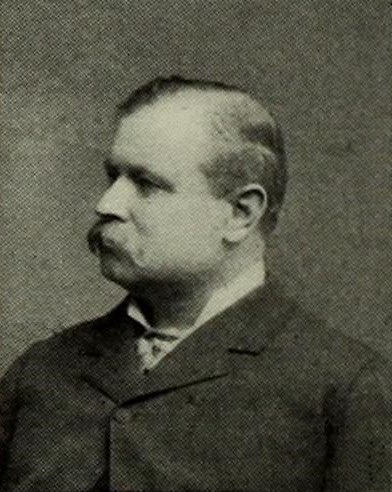
- Henry C. Warfel circa 1901
- Born: Henry Clay Warfel; September 14, 1844; Mill Creek, Pennsylvania, U.S.
- Died: June 17, 1923 (aged 78)
- Burial place: Philipsburg Cemetery
- Military career
- Branch: Union Army
- Rank: Private
- Units: 125th Pennsylvania Volunteer Infantry; 1st Pennsylvania Cavalry
- Conflicts: American Civil War: Appomattox Campaign
- Awards: Medal of Honor

Henry Clay Warfel (1844–1923) was an American Civil War Medal of Honor recipient. He received the Medal of Honor for his actions during the Appomattox Campaign as a member of the 1st Pennsylvania Cavalry. Warfel was born on September 14, 1844, in Mill Creek, Pennsylvania, and died on June 17, 1923, in Philipsburg, Pennsylvania. At the time of his death he worked as a Justice of the Peace. He is buried at the Philipsburg Cemetery in South Philipsburg, Pennsylvania.

== Military service ==
Henry C. Warfel enlisted first with the 125th Pennsylvania Volunteer Infantry in August 1862. His unit fought at Antietam and Chancellorsville. He re-enlisted, with the 195th Pennsylvania Volunteer Infantry, in 1863 and was then transferred to Company A of the 1st Pennsylvania Cavalry. He participated in the Grand Review of the Armies in Washington, D.C., in May 1865, and was discharged on May 27, 1865.

== Medal of Honor Citation ==
Warfel was awarded the Medal of Honor on May 3, 1865, for his actions on April 5, 1865. The citation reads:

"The President of the United States of America, in the name of Congress, takes pleasure in presenting the Medal of Honor to Private Henry Clay Warfel, United States Army, for extraordinary heroism on 5 April 1865, while serving with Company A, 1st Pennsylvania Cavalry, in action at Paines Crossroads, Virginia, for capture of Virginia State colors."
