= Montrose Park, Pennsylvania =

Unincorporated community in Pennsylvania, US

- Unincorporated community
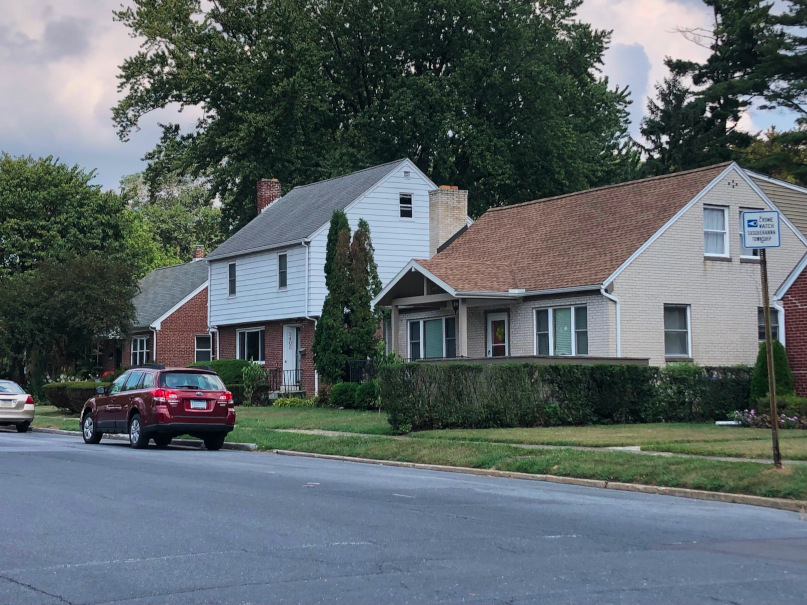
- Suburban Montrose Park neighborhood in Susquehanna Twp.
- Interactive map of Montrose Park, Pennsylvania
- Coordinates: 40.302310°N 76.899696°W
- Country: United States
- State: Pennsylvania
- County: Dauphin
- Township: Susquehanna
- Elevation: 331 ft (101 m)
- Time zone: UTC-5 (Eastern (EST))
  - Summer (DST): UTC-4 (EDT)
- Area codes: 717 and 223

Montrose Park is a populated place and unincorporated community that is located in Susquehanna Township, Dauphin County, Pennsylvania, United States. It is part of the Harrisburg-Carlisle, Metropolitan Statistical Area.

It is roughly bounded by Front Street to the west, Montrose Street to the north, Sixth Street to the east and the Harrisburg city line to the south.

== History ==
This neighborhood was established after local contractors built homes for their workers. During the 1950s, the Jewish Community Center relocated there from the current Harrisburg Midtown Arts Center building in Midtown Harrisburg, and the neighborhood attracted a large Jewish following.
