= Betty Warfel =

- Born: May 15, 1928; Enola, Pennsylvania, U.S.
- Died: September 23, 1990 (aged 62); Enola, Pennsylvania, U.S.
- Batted: Right Threw: Right

Teams
- Rockford Peaches (1948–1949)

Career highlights and awards
- Championship team (1948–1949); Women in Baseball – AAGPBL Permanent Display at Baseball Hall of Fame and Museum (1988)

Betty Warfel (May 15, 1928 – September 23, 1990) was a pitcher and utility infielder who played in the All-American Girls Professional Baseball League between the 1948 and 1949 seasons. Listed at 5 ft 8 in (1.73 m), 135 lb., Warfel batted and threw right-handed. She was born in Enola, Pennsylvania.

Betty Warfel was a highly versatile player for the Rockford Peaches during her two years in the league, helping her team win the championship title in each of these seasons. She served as a reliever and spot starter, while also being able to play at second base, third base and shortstop when she was not pitching.

Following her baseball days, Warfel worked at Westinghouse Electric Company for 33 years. After retiring, she became an avid bowler and enjoyed the outdoors.

Since 1988 she is part of Women in Baseball, a permanent display based at the Baseball Hall of Fame and Museum in Cooperstown, New York, which was unveiled to honor the entire AAGPBL rather than individual baseball personalities.

== Career statistics ==
Batting

GP	AB	R	H	2B	3B	HR	RBI	SB	TB	BB	SO	BA	OBP	SLG
70	193	16	32	3	0	1	15	10	38	21	37	.166	.248	.197

Pitching

GP	W	L	W-L%	ERA	IP	H	RA	ER	BB	SO	HBP	WP	WHIP
20	6	5	.545	2.63	96	57	36	28	48	18	6	5	1.09

Fielding

GP	PO	A	E	TC	DP	FA
74	80	124	26	230	10	.887
