= Rye Township, Pennsylvania =

Township in Pennsylvania, US

Coordinates: 40°20′00″N 76°57′59″W

- Township
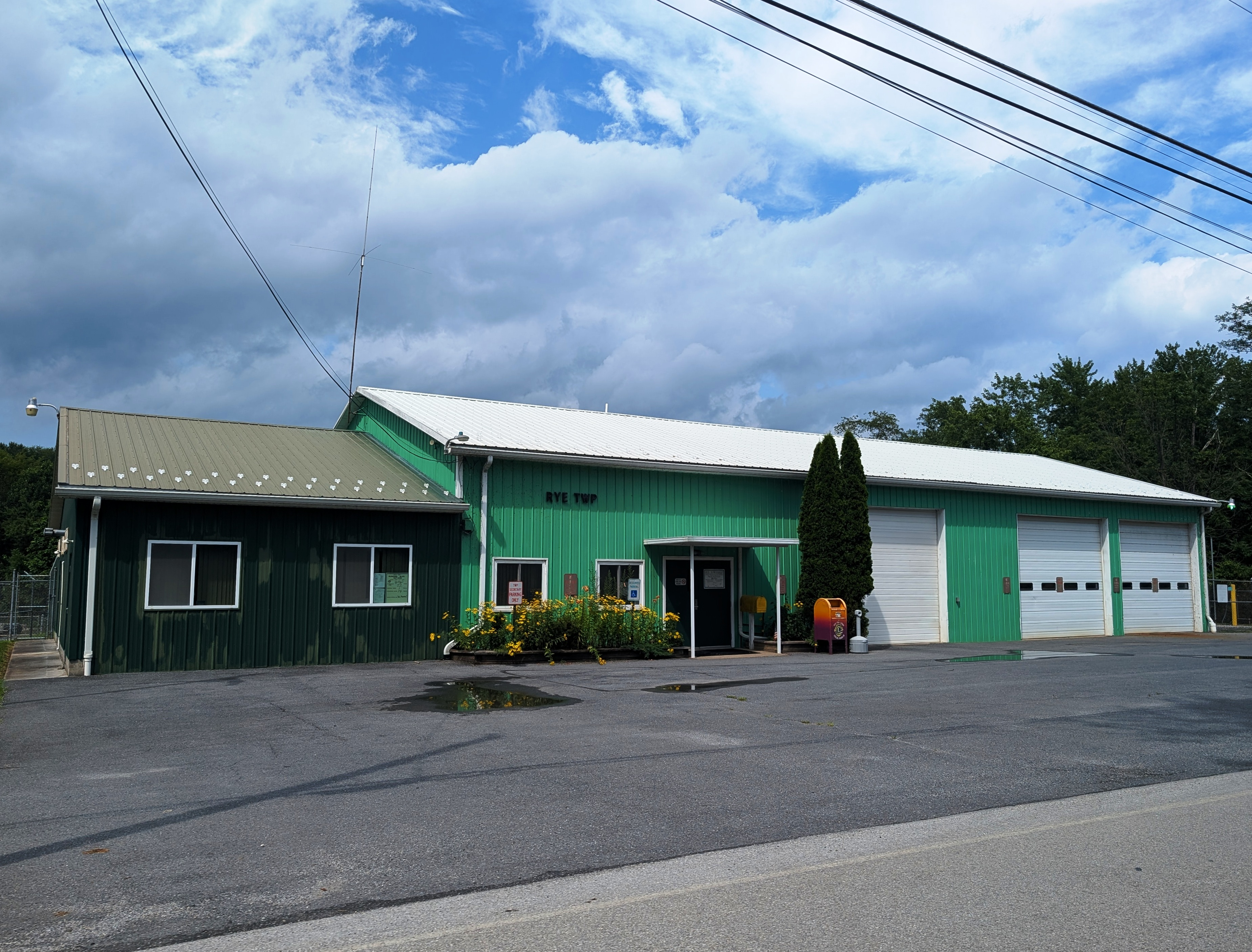
- Rye Township Municipal Building

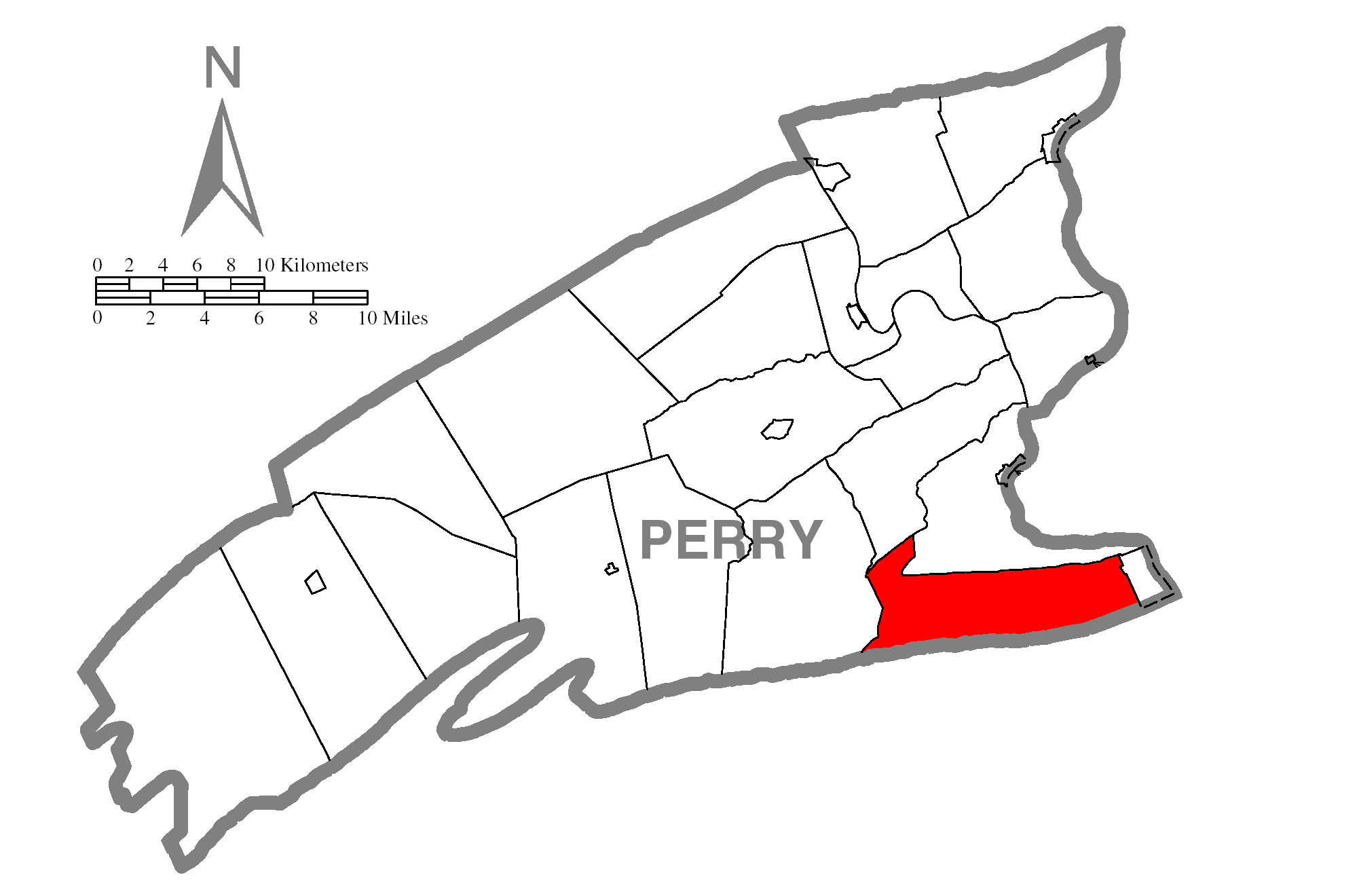
- Map of Perry County, Pennsylvania highlighting Rye Township

- Map of Perry County, Pennsylvania
- Country: United States
- State: Pennsylvania
- County: Perry
- Settled: 1755
- Incorporated: 1766

Government
  - Type: Board of Supervisors
  - Chairman: [Ken Quigley]
  - Vice-chairman: James Sabo
  - Supervisor: John Stahl

Area
  - Total: 25.73 sq mi (66.63 km^{2})
  - Land: 25.71 sq mi (66.60 km^{2})
  - Water: 0.012 sq mi (0.03 km^{2})

Population (2020)
  - Total: 2,262 ▼
  - Estimate (2023): 2,259
  - Density: 91.3/sq mi (35.24/km^{2})
- Time zone: UTC-5 (Eastern (EST))
  - Summer (DST): UTC-4 (EDT)
- Area code: 717
- FIPS code: 42-099-66976
- Website: Rye Township

Rye Township is a township in Perry County, Pennsylvania, United States. The population was 2,262 at the 2020 census.

== Geography ==
According to the United States Census Bureau, the township has a total area of 25.6 square miles (66.3 km^{2}), all land.

== Demographics ==
Historical population
Census	Pop.	Note	%±
2010	2,364		—
2020	2,262		−4.3%
2023 (est.)	2,259		−0.1%
U.S. Decennial Census

As of the census of 2000, there were 2,327 people, 850 households, and 690 families residing in the township. The population density was 90.9 inhabitants per square mile (35.1/km^{2}). There were 872 housing units at an average density of 34.0 per square mile (13.1/km^{2}). The racial makeup of the township was 99.05% White, 0.21% African American, 0.34% Asian, 0.09% from other races, and 0.30% from two or more races. Hispanic or Latino of any race were 0.56% of the population.

There were 850 households, out of which 36.6% had children under the age of 18 living with them, 70.8% were married couples living together, 6.4% had a female householder with no husband present, and 18.8% were non-families. 14.5% of all households were made up of individuals, and 6.5% had someone living alone who was 65 years of age or older. The average household size was 2.74 and the average family size was 3.03.

In the township the population was spread out, with 25.0% under the age of 18, 5.8% from 18 to 24, 29.4% from 25 to 44, 29.6% from 45 to 64, and 10.1% who were 65 years of age or older. The median age was 40 years. For every 100 females, there were 98.4 males. For every 100 females age 18 and over, there were 96.7 males.

The median income for a household in the township was $56,375, and the median income for a family was $61,007. Males had a median income of $40,303 versus $29,861 for females. The per capita income for the township was approximately $8,000.00. About 2.6% of families and 3.7% of the population were below the poverty line, including 2.2% of those under age 18 and 8.2% of those age 65 or over.
