= Progress, Pennsylvania =

Unincorporated community in Pennsylvania, US

- Census-designated place
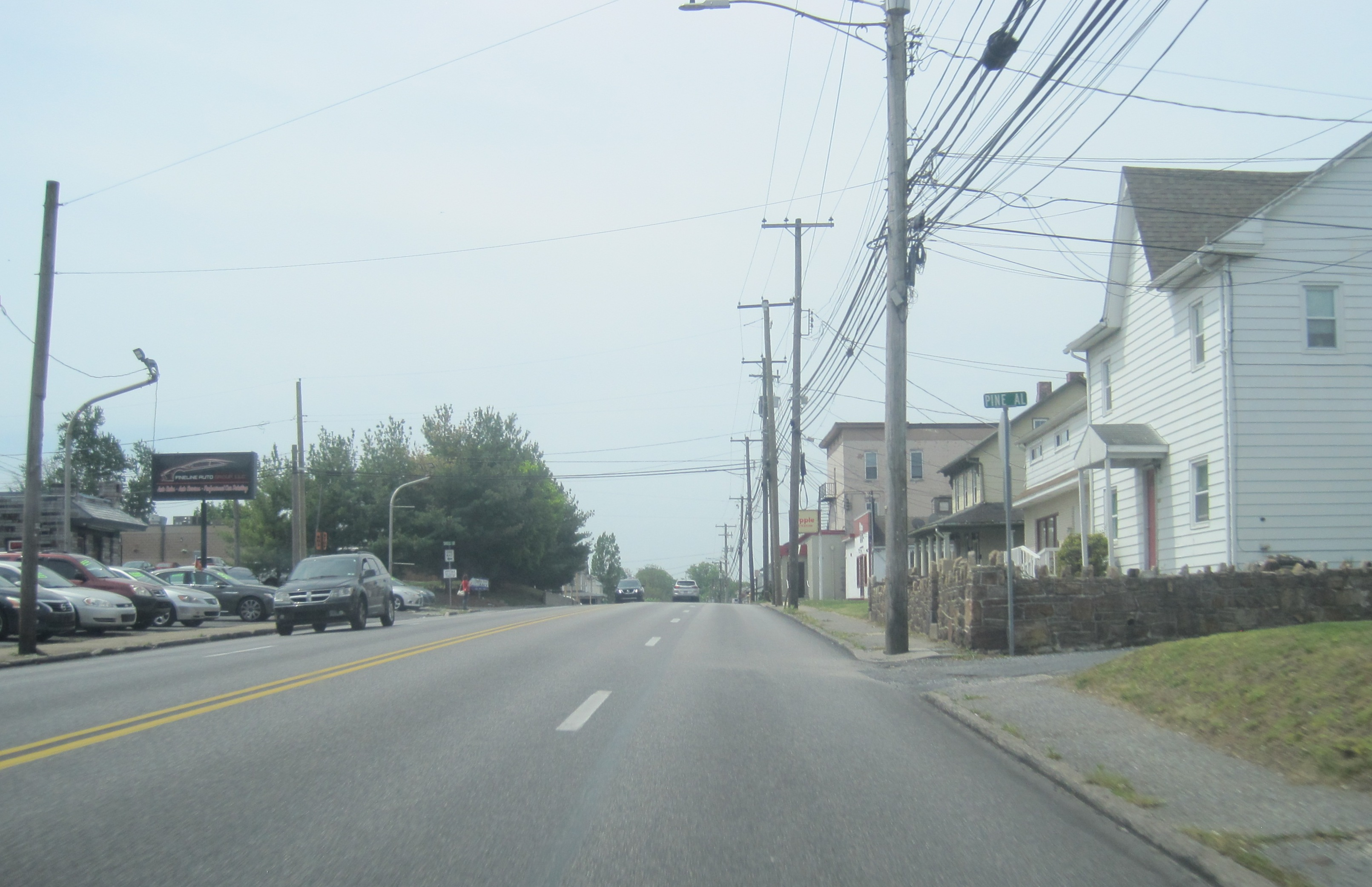
- Westbound US 22 (Walnut Street) in Progress

- Location in Dauphin County and state of Pennsylvania
- Coordinates
- Country: United States
- State: Pennsylvania
- County: Dauphin
- Townships: Susquehanna, Lower Paxton

Area
  - Total: 3.02 sq mi (7.81 km^{2})
  - Land: 3.02 sq mi (7.81 km^{2})
  - Water: 0 sq mi (0.00 km^{2})
- Elevation: 500 ft (150 m)

Population (2020)
  - Total: 11,168
  - Density: 3,704.3/sq mi (1,430.24/km^{2})
- Time zone: UTC-5 (Eastern (EST))
  - Summer (DST): UTC-4 (EDT)
- ZIP code: 17109
- Area codes: 717 and 223
- FIPS code: 42-62736
- GNIS feature ID: 1184434

Progress (/ˈproʊɡrɛs/, PRO-gress) is an unincorporated community and census-designated place (CDP) mainly in Susquehanna Township but also in Lower Paxton Township, Pennsylvania, United States. The population was 11,168 at the 2020 census. It is part of the Harrisburg–Carlisle Metropolitan Statistical Area.

== History ==
When Susquehanna Township was founded in 1815, Progress was the only established settlement in the south end. Daniel Shell laid out the community sometime in the 18th Century, where it was known by a few names: Jacob's Plains, Mud Town, Shellstown, and finally Progress. Originally most of the Township's population resided in Progress. Trolley cars ran along present day U.S. Route 22 until 1936, when the road was widened for increasing automobile traffic.

Progress was named for the progressive spirit of its original inhabitants, though the pronunciation is different.

== Geography ==
Progress is located in southeastern Susquehanna Township at Walnut and Shell Streets and extends east into the western part of Lower Paxton Township. It is bordered to the east by Colonial Park and to the southwest by the borough of Penbrook.

According to the United States Census Bureau, the CDP has a total area of 2.8 square miles (7.3 km^{2}), all land. The axis roads are Jonestown Road (U.S. Route 22, running northeast–southwest) and Progress Avenue (running north–south), which interchanges with Interstate 81 a short distance to the north. Interstate 83 serves as the eastern boundary, separating Progress from Colonial Park, and with access from Exit 48 (Union Deposit Road) and Exit 50 (U.S. Route 22). US 22 leads west 3 miles (5 km) into downtown Harrisburg.

== Demographics ==
Historical population
Census	Pop.	Note	%±
1990	9,654		—
2000	9,647		−0.1%
2010	9,765		1.2%
2020	11,168		14.4%
U.S. Decennial Census

=== 2020 census ===
As of the 2020 census, Progress had a population of 11,168. The median age was 39.6 years. 21.7% of residents were under the age of 18 and 17.8% of residents were 65 years of age or older. For every 100 females there were 87.0 males, and for every 100 females age 18 and over there were 83.4 males age 18 and over.

100.0% of residents lived in urban areas, while 0.0% lived in rural areas.

There were 4,621 households in Progress, of which 28.4% had children under the age of 18 living in them. Of all households, 39.2% were married-couple households, 20.5% were households with a male householder and no spouse or partner present, and 32.0% were households with a female householder and no spouse or partner present. About 32.9% of all households were made up of individuals and 12.4% had someone living alone who was 65 years of age or older.

There were 4,923 housing units, of which 6.1% were vacant. The homeowner vacancy rate was 1.1% and the rental vacancy rate was 8.5%.

Racial composition as of the 2020 census
Race	Number	Percent
White	5,246	47.0%
Black or African American	3,146	28.2%
American Indian and Alaska Native	38	0.3%
Asian	1,191	10.7%
Native Hawaiian and Other Pacific Islander	8	0.1%
Some other race	589	5.3%
Two or more races	950	8.5%
Hispanic or Latino (of any race)	1,202	10.8%

=== 2000 census ===
At the 2000 census there were 9,647 people in 4,386 households, including 2,557 families, in the CDP. The population density was 3,498.4 inhabitants per square mile (1,350.7/km^{2}). There were 4,569 housing units at an average density of 1,656.9 per square mile (639.7/km^{2}). The racial makeup of the CDP was 75.18% White, 18.97% African American, 0.16% Native American, 1.91% Asian, 0.05% Pacific Islander, 1.29% from other races, and 2.45% from two or more races. Hispanic or Latino of any race were 2.86%.

There were 4,386 households, 24.3% had children under the age of 18 living with them, 42.5% were married couples living together, 12.7% had a female householder with no husband present, and 41.7% were non-families. 35.3% of households were made up of individuals, and 13.6% were one person aged 65 or older. The average household size was 2.17 and the average family size was 2.82.

The age distribution was 20.6% under the age of 18, 7.2% from 18 to 24, 29.0% from 25 to 44, 24.2% from 45 to 64, and 19.1% 65 or older. The median age was 41 years. For every 100 females, there were 83.9 males. For every 100 females age 18 and over, there were 80.0 males.

The median household income was $41,641 and the median family income was $54,177. Males had a median income of $36,407 versus $31,002 for females. The per capita income for the CDP was $22,533. About 6.9% of families and 7.3% of the population were below the poverty line, including 9.9% of those under age 18 and 4.1% of those age 65 or over.
