= Marysville, Pennsylvania =

Borough in Pennsylvania, US

- Borough
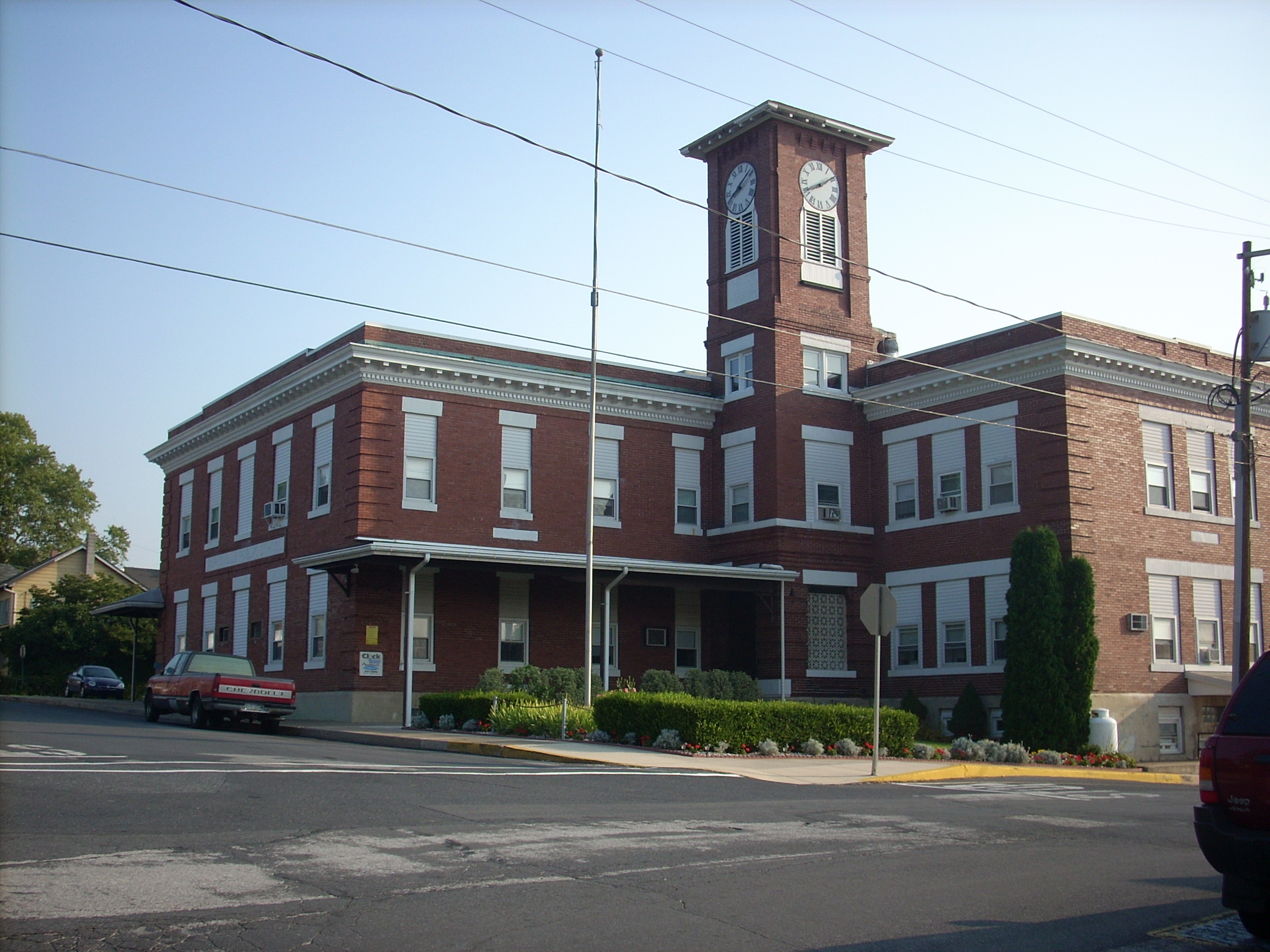
- The former Public School for Marysville

- Logo

- Location of Marysville in Perry County, Pennsylvania.

- Location within Pennsylvania Location within the United States
- Coordinates: 40°20′28″N 76°55′59″W
- Country: United States
- State: Pennsylvania
- County: Perry
- Settled: 1755
- Incorporated: 1867

Government
  - Type: Borough Council
  - Mayor: Steve Palmer
  - Council President: Lance Barthel
  - Council Vice President: Charles Wentzel
  - Council President Pro-Tem: Leigh Ann Urban

Area
  - Total: 2.34 sq mi (6.06 km^{2})
  - Land: 2.34 sq mi (6.05 km^{2})
  - Water: 0.0039 sq mi (0.01 km^{2})
- Elevation (Borough benchmark near center): 369 ft (112 m)
- Highest elevation (Cove Mountain): 1,200 ft (370 m)
- Lowest elevation (Susquehanna River): 328 ft (100 m)

Population (2020)
  - Total: 2,652
  - Density: 1,135.8/sq mi (438.53/km^{2})
- Time zone: UTC-5 (Eastern (EST))
  - Summer (DST): UTC-4 (EDT)
- Zip code: 17053
- Area code: 717
- FIPS code: 42-47968
- Website: marysvilleboroughpa.gov

Marysville is a borough in Perry County, Pennsylvania, United States. The population was 2,652 at the 2020 census. It is part of the Harrisburg–Carlisle Metropolitan Statistical Area.

The borough was settled in 1755, incorporated as the Borough of Haley in 1866, and re-incorporated as the Borough of Marysville in 1867.

== History ==
The Rockville Bridge was added to the National Register of Historic Places in 1975.

== Geography ==
Marysville is located at 40°20′28″N 76°55′59″W (40.342287, -76.931463).

According to the United States Census Bureau, the borough has a total area of 2.4 square miles (6.2 km^{2}), all land.

Marysville is bordered by Blue Mountain to the south, by the Susquehanna River to the east, by Cove Mountain to the north, and by Rye Township to the west. U.S. Route 11/U.S. Route 15 passes through the town from north to south, and Pennsylvania Route 850 has its terminus here.

== Demographics ==
Historical population
Census	Pop.	Note	%±
1870	863		—
1880	1,206		39.7%
1890	1,115		−7.5%
1900	1,463		31.2%
1910	1,693		15.7%
1920	1,877		10.9%
1930	1,922		2.4%
1940	1,882		−2.1%
1950	2,158		14.7%
1960	2,580		19.6%
1970	2,328		−9.8%
1980	2,452		5.3%
1990	2,425		−1.1%
2000	2,306		−4.9%
2010	2,534		9.9%
2020	2,652		4.7%
2021 (est.)	2,661	▲	0.3%

As of the census of 2000, there were 2,306 people, 1,027 households, and 635 families residing in the borough. The population density was 966.8 inhabitants per square mile (373.3/km^{2}). There were 1,103 housing units at an average density of 462.4 per square mile (178.5/km^{2}). The racial makeup of the borough was 98.44% White, 0.17% African American, 0.09% Asian, 0.22% from other races, and 1.08% from two or more races. Hispanic or Latino of any race were 0.22% of the population.

There were 1,027 households, of which 25.0% had children under the age of 18 living with them. 46.7% were married couples living together, 11.2% had a female householder with no husband present, and 38.1% were non-families. 31.3% of all households were made up of individuals, and 14.4% had someone living alone who was 65 years of age or older. The average household size was 2.25 and the average family size was 2.80.

In the borough the population was spread out, with 21.2% under the age of 18, 7.4% from 18 to 24, 29.3% from 25 to 44, 24.9% from 45 to 64, and 17.2% who were 65 years of age or older. The median age was 40 years. For every 100 females, there were 87.6 males. For every 100 females age 18 and over, there were 86.1 males.

The median income for a household in the borough was $40,446, and the median income for a family was $47,094. Males had a median income of $35,500 versus $24,964 for females. The per capita income for the borough was $19,604. About 5.2% of families and 6.8% of the population were below the poverty line, including 11.2% of those age 18 or younger, and 5.2% of those age 65 or over.
