= Rockville, Pennsylvania =

Unincorporated community in Pennsylvania, US

- Unincorporated community
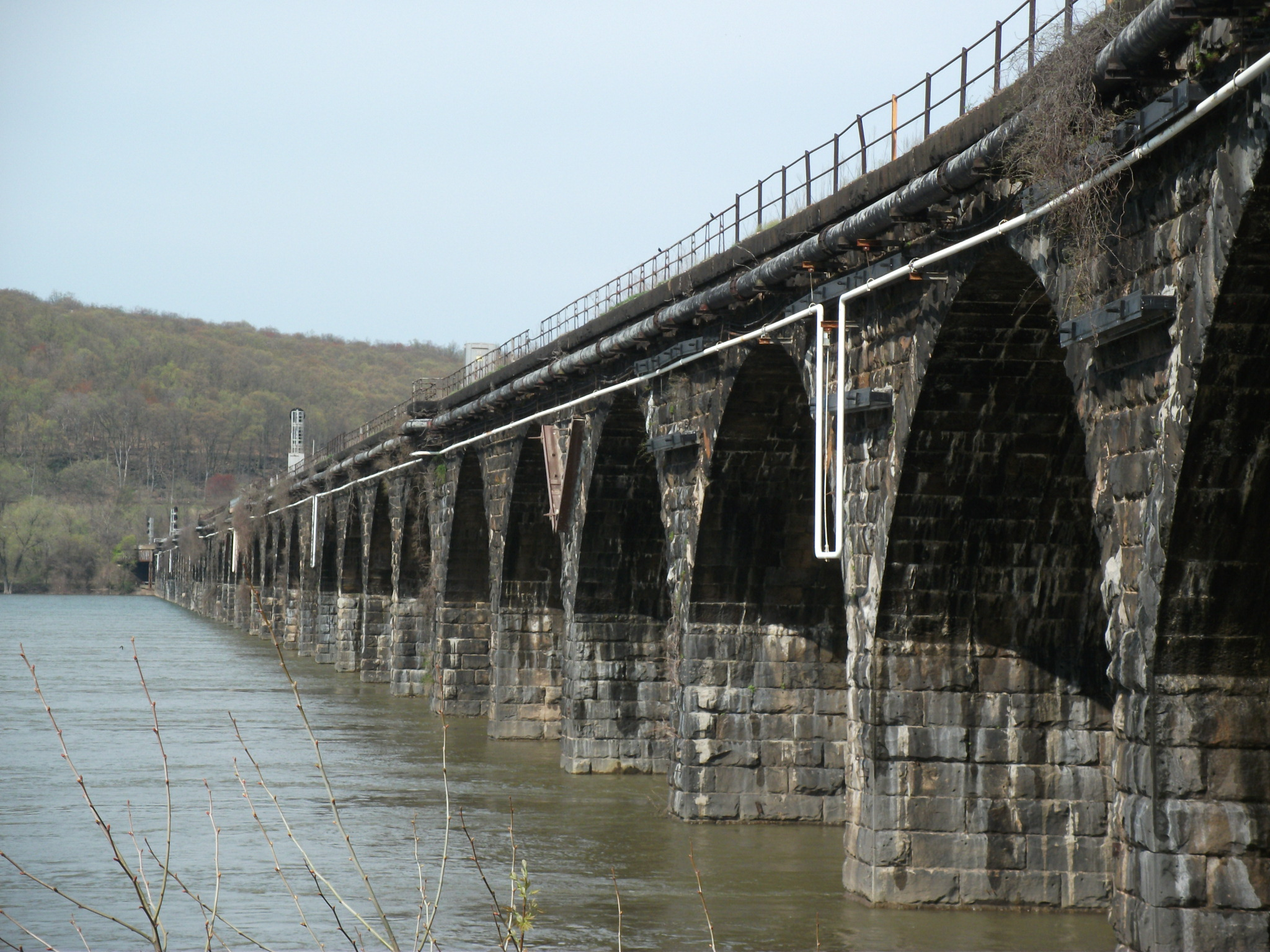
- The Rockville Bridge over the Susquehanna River
- Interactive map of Rockville, Pennsylvania
- Coordinates: 40.33481°N 76.90411°W
- Country: United States
- State: Pennsylvania
- County: Dauphin
- Township: Susquehanna
- Time zone: UTC-5 (Eastern (EST))
  - Summer (DST): UTC-4 (EDT)
- Area codes: 717 and 223

Rockville is an unincorporated community in Susquehanna Township, Dauphin County, Pennsylvania, United States. The community is home to the Rockville Bridge.

Rockville is part of the Harrisburg–Carlisle Metropolitan Statistical Area.

Originally settled in 1774 and referred to as Bushy Rock, the town of Rockville was laid out in 1834 to 1838 as Roberts Valley, by Mrs. Matilda Cox.
