= Pennsylvania Route 241 =

State highway in Pennsylvania, US

Pennsylvania Route 241

Route information
- Maintained by PennDOT and City of Lebanon
- Length: 23.620 mi (38.013 km)

Major junctions
- South end: PA 441 in Conoy Township
- PA 230 / PA 743 in Elizabethtown; PA 341 in South Londonderry Township; PA 117 in South Londonderry Township; US 322 in South Annville Township; PA 934 in South Annville Township
- North end: PA 72 in Lebanon

Location
- Country: United States
- State: Pennsylvania
- Counties: Lancaster, Lebanon

Highway system
- Pennsylvania State Route System; Interstate; US; State; Scenic; Legislative
← PA 240	→ PA 242

Pennsylvania Route 241 (PA 241) is a 23.6-mile-long (38.0 km) state highway in the U.S. state of Pennsylvania. The route, which is signed north-south, runs from PA 441 in Conoy Township, Lancaster County, northeast to PA 72 in the city of Lebanon in Lebanon County. The route heads northeast from PA 441 to Elizabethtown, where it runs concurrent with both PA 230 and PA 743. PA 241 continues into Lebanon County and intersects PA 341 and PA 117 in Colebrook. The route heads northeast and forms a concurrency with U.S. Route 322 (US 322) before continuing to Lebanon.

The route follows part of Legislative Route 280, which was designated in 1911. PA 241 was designated in 1928 to run from PA 441 in Marietta north to PA 72 in Lebanon, heading north to Maytown and west to Bainbridge before continuing northeast along its current alignment. The southern terminus was cut back to PA 340 (now PA 743) in Maytown in the 1930s, with the route south of there replaced by PA 340. The northern terminus was cut back slightly in the 1950s following a rerouting of PA 72. In 1961, the south end of PA 241 was moved to its current location.

== Route description ==
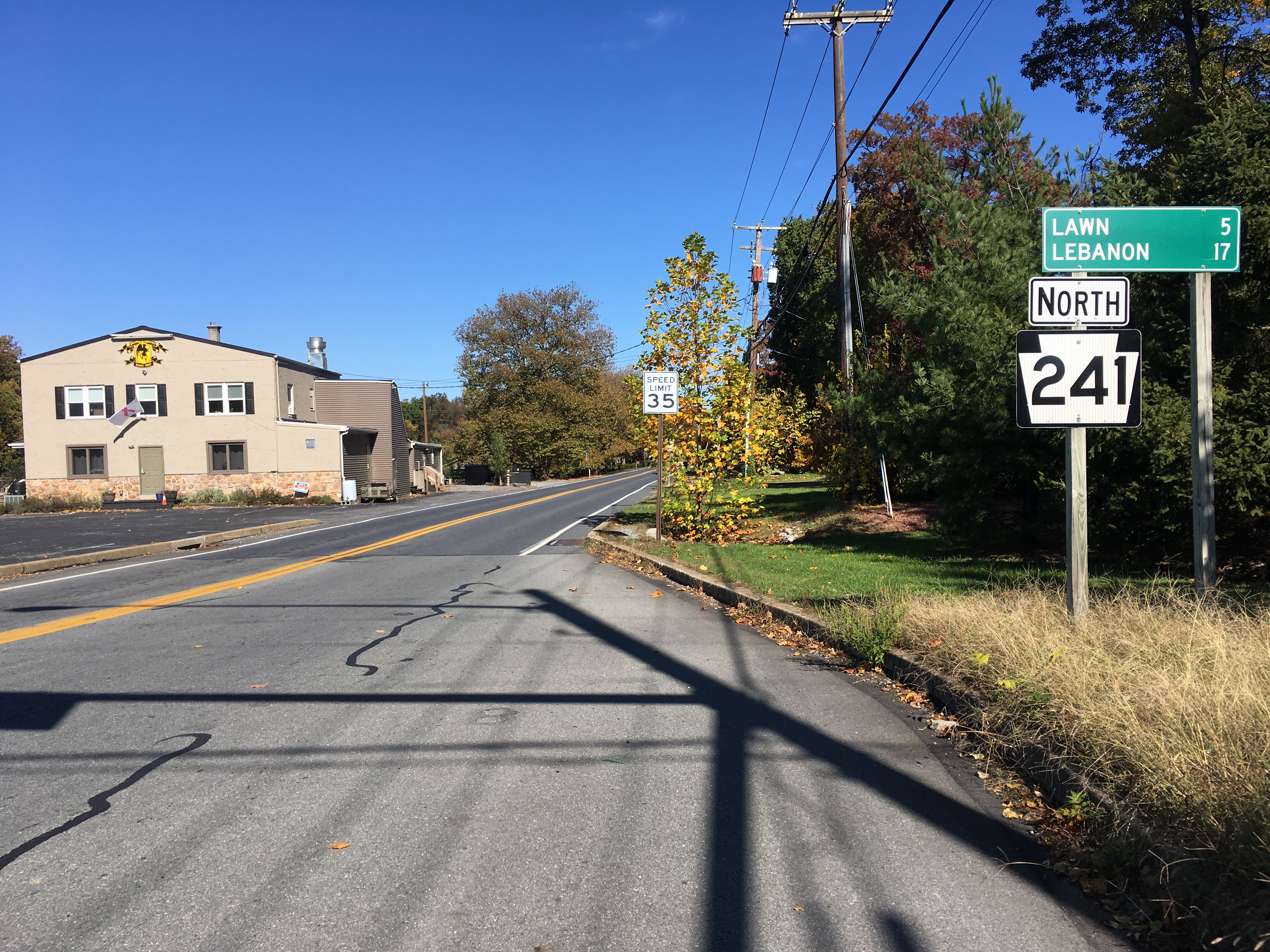
PA 241 northbound past PA 743 in Elizabethtown

PA 241 begins at an intersection with PA 441 north of the community of Bainbridge in Conoy Township, Lancaster County, heading northeast on two-lane undivided Bainbridge Road. The road passes through a mix of farmland and woodland with some homes, crossing into West Donegal Township. The route continues through agricultural areas, crossing Conoy Creek and running parallel along the east side of the creek. The road crosses the creek again and passes to the east of the large Masonic Village retirement community. PA 241 heads into the borough of Elizabethtown and becomes West Bainbridge Street, soon turning northwest onto Masonic Drive. The route heads through commercial areas a short distance to the southwest of Amtrak's Keystone Corridor railroad line before running between Masonic Village to the south and Elizabethtown station along the Amtrak line to the north. PA 241 turns north onto West High Street and passes under the Keystone Corridor west of the station. The road curves northeast and crosses a railroad spur from the Amtrak line at-grade as it heads through residential areas, crossing Conoy Creek, prior to coming to an intersection with PA 230/PA 743 in the commercial downtown. Here, PA 241 turns north to form a concurrency with PA 230 and PA 743 on North Market Street. The road crosses the creek again before it leaves the downtown and enters residential areas, with PA 241 and PA 743 splitting from PA 230 by briefly heading northeast on Linden Avenue. PA 241 and PA 743 turn north onto North Hanover Street a short distance later, passing a mix of homes and businesses as it crosses into Mount Joy Township and becomes Hershey Road. PA 241 splits from PA 743 by heading northeast onto Mt. Gretna Road, heading through wooded residential areas before coming to a bridge over the PA 283 freeway. The road continues through rural residential areas with woods to the northwest and farms to the southeast before winding north through forests. The route curves northeast and runs through a mix of farm fields and woods with some homes, passing through the community of Bellaire.

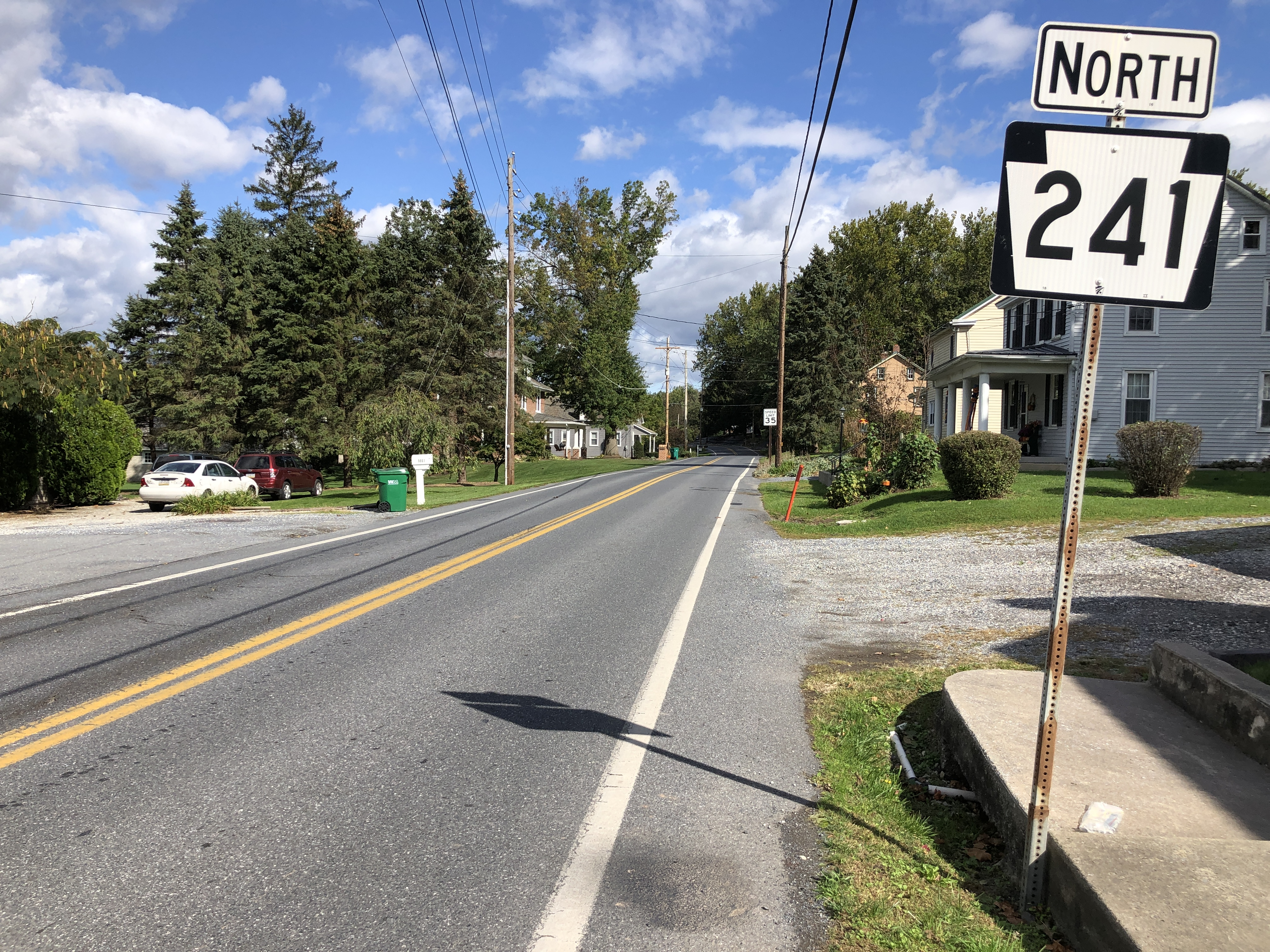
PA 241 northbound in South Londonderry Township

PA 241 enters South Londonderry Township in Lebanon County, where the name changes to Elizabethtown Road. The road continues northeast through farmland with some homes and comes to a bridge under the Pennsylvania Turnpike (Interstate 76). The route runs through a mix of farms and woods, passing through the residential community of Lawn. PA 241 continues through rural areas, with the Lebanon Valley Rail Trail and Conewago Creek parallel to the northwest of the road, and crosses the trail and creek before it reaches a junction with the eastern terminus of PA 341. Here, the route runs through a mix of fields, woods, and homes before it crosses the Conewago Creek again and comes to an intersection with PA 117 in the community of Colebrook. At this point, PA 241 turns north for a concurrency with PA 117 along Mt. Wilson Road, and the two routes head northwest across the creek and through farm fields. PA 117 splits to the west and PA 241 continues northeast through forested areas with some homes, crossing into South Annville Township. The road passes to the south of an industrial complex before it continues through forests, curving to the north. The route heads east and enters the agricultural Lebanon Valley, where it turns to the north. The road continues through farmland with some homes before it reaches a junction with US 322 near Fontana. Here, PA 241 turns east for a concurrency with US 322 along Horseshoe Pike, soon intersecting the southern terminus of PA 934. The road continues east through agricultural areas, entering West Cornwall Township, before PA 241 splits from US 322 by turning north onto Colebrook Road. The route enters North Cornwall Township and curves northeast as it continues through farmland with some residential development. The road winds northeast through rural land and passes through the community of Rocherty, where it meets Rocherty Road at a roundabout, before it runs through a mix of farms and residential and commercial development. The route continues past homes and crosses into the city of Lebanon, where it becomes city-maintained. A short distance later, PA 241 reaches its northern terminus at an intersection with PA 72.

== History ==
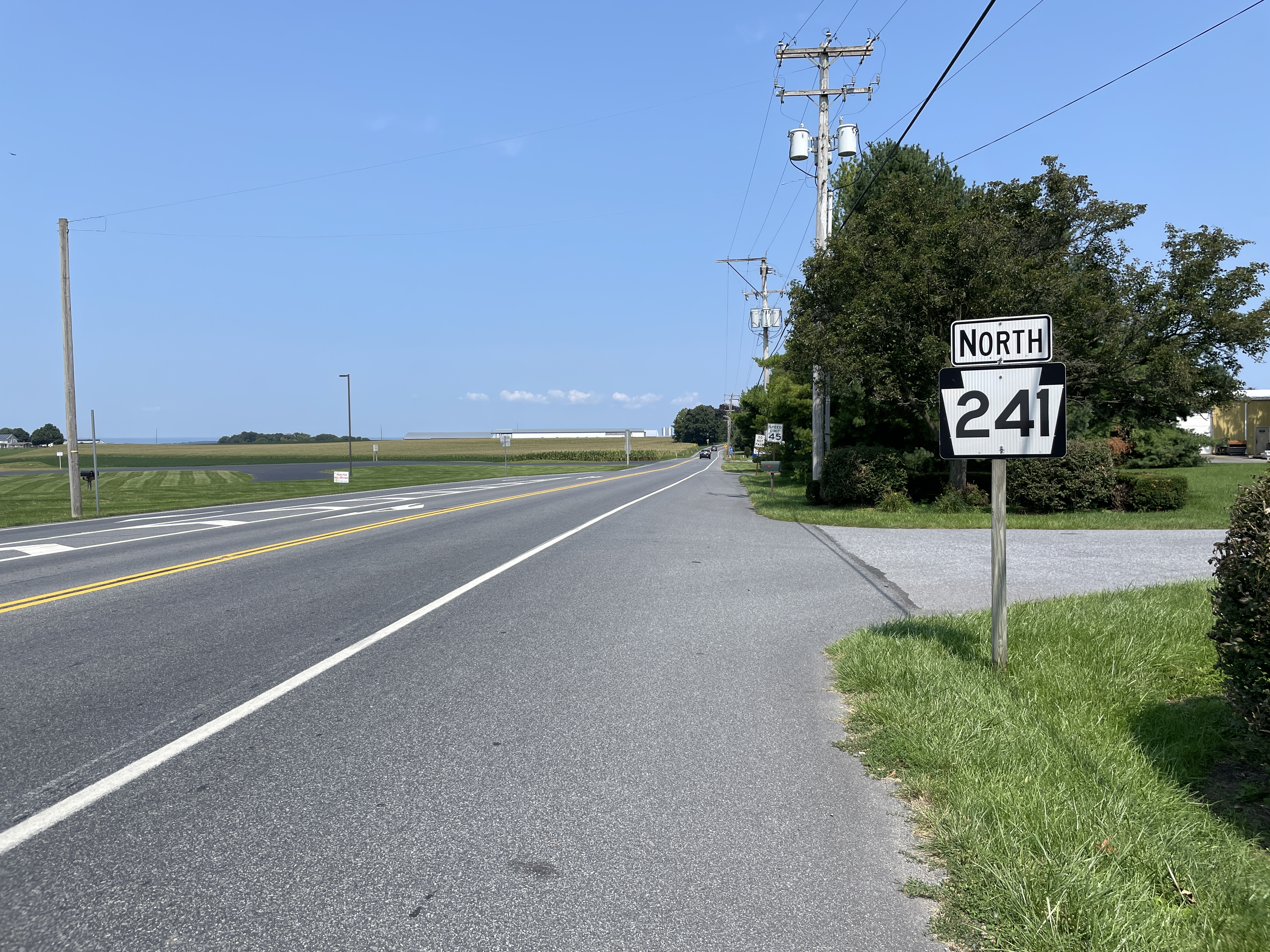
PA 241 northbound past US 322 in West Cornwall Township

When routes were legislated in Pennsylvania in 1911, the current routing of PA 241 was designated as part of Legislative Route 280, which continued southeast from Bainbridge to Columbia. By 1926, the roadway between Elizabethtown and Lebanon was paved while the road southwest from Elizabethtown to Bainbridge was unpaved. PA 241 was designated in 1928 to run from PA 441 in Marietta north to PA 72 in Lebanon. The route followed Maytown Road north to Maytown, Stackstown Road west to Bainbridge, and PA 441 northwest before it continued northeast along its current alignment to Lebanon and north along Quentin Road to end at PA 72 at Cornwall Road. The entire length of route was paved by 1930. In the 1930s, the southern terminus of PA 241 was cut back to PA 340 (now PA 743) in Maytown, with PA 340 replacing the route between Marietta and Maytown. The northern terminus was moved to its current location in the 1950s following the rerouting of PA 72 to Quentin Road. The southern terminus of the route was cut back to its current location at PA 441 near Bainbridge in 1961. On June 28, 2021, construction began on a roundabout at Rocherty Road in North Cornwall Township. Construction of the roundabout, which cost $3.4 million, was completed in October 2021.

== Major intersections ==
County	Location	mi	km	Destinations	Notes
Lancaster	Conoy Township	0.000	0.000	PA 441 (River Road) – Marietta, Middletown	Southern terminus
Lancaster	Elizabethtown	5.503	8.856	PA 230 east / PA 743 south (South Market Street)	South end of PA 230/PA 743 concurrency
Lancaster	Elizabethtown	5.967	9.603	PA 230 west (North Market Street)	North end of PA 230 concurrency
Lancaster	Mount Joy Township	6.604	10.628	PA 743 north (Hershey Road) to PA 283 – Hershey	North end of PA 743 concurrency
Lebanon	South Londonderry Township	13.718	22.077	PA 341 west (Colebrook Road) – Upper Lawn, Deodate	Eastern terminus of PA 341
Lebanon	South Londonderry Township	14.389	23.157	PA 117 south (Mount Wilson Road) – Mastersonville, Mount Gretna	South end of PA 117 concurrency
Lebanon	South Londonderry Township	14.881	23.949	PA 117 north (South Forge Road)	North end of PA 117 concurrency
Lebanon	South Annville Township	18.713	30.116	US 322 west (Horseshoe Pike) – Hershey	South end of US 322 concurrency
Lebanon	South Annville Township	18.913	30.438	PA 934 north (South White Oak Street) – Annville	Southern terminus of PA 934
Lebanon	West Cornwall Township	19.742	31.772	US 322 east (Horseshoe Pike) – Cornwall	North end of US 322 concurrency
Lebanon	Lebanon	23.620	38.013	PA 72 (Quentin Road)	Northern terminus
1.000 mi = 1.609 km; 1.000 km = 0.621 mi: Concurrency terminus

== PA 241 Truck ==
Pennsylvania Route 241 Truck
- Location: Lancaster County, Pennsylvania
- Existed: 2013–2017

Pennsylvania Route 241 Truck was an unsigned truck route marked with a red arrow that bypassed two weight restricted bridges over the Conoy Creek, on which trucks over 27 tons and combination loads over 32 tons were prohibited. The route followed PA 441 and PA 743 through Lancaster County. The route was established in 2013. Both bridges were reconstructed in 2017, resulting in the deletion of the route.
