= Pennsylvania Route 230 =

State highway in Pennsylvania, US

Pennsylvania Route 230

Route information
- Maintained by PennDOT
- Length: 28.355 mi (45.633 km)
- Existed: 1967–present

Major junctions
- West end: US 22 in Harrisburg
- Airport Connector near Middletown; PA 441 in Middletown; PA 341 near Middletown; PA 241 / PA 743 in Elizabethtown; PA 772 in Mount Joy
- East end: PA 283 in Salunga

Location
- Country: United States
- State: Pennsylvania
- Counties: Dauphin, Lancaster

Highway system
- Pennsylvania State Route System; Interstate; US; State; Scenic; Legislative
← PA 229	→ PA 231

Pennsylvania Route 230 (PA 230) is a 28.4-mile (45.7 km) long state route in central Pennsylvania. Its western terminus is at an intersection with U.S. Route 22 (US 22) in Harrisburg. Its eastern terminus is at an interchange with PA 283 near Salunga. The route passes northwest-southeast through Dauphin and Lancaster counties and serves as a surface road parallel to the PA 283 freeway that connects the cities of Harrisburg and Lancaster. Along the way, PA 230 passes through Middletown, Elizabethtown, and Mount Joy. The route intersects the Airport Connector near the Harrisburg International Airport, PA 441 and PA 341 in the Middletown area, PA 241 and PA 743 in Elizabethtown, and PA 772 in Mount Joy.

The road between Middletown and Lancaster was originally a private turnpike dating back to the 18th and 19th centuries. Legislative Route 129 was designated between Harrisburg and Lancaster in 1911. With the creation of the U.S. Highway System in 1926, a spur of US 30 called U.S. Route 230 (US 230) was designated from US 22/PA 3/PA 13 at Cameron and Mulberry streets in Harrisburg southeast to US 1 in Conowingo, Maryland. The route ran concurrent with PA 41 between Harrisburg and Lancaster and PA 72 between Lancaster and the Maryland state line. The eastern terminus of US 230 was cut back to US 30/PA 1 and US 222/PA 41/PA 72 at King and Prince streets in downtown Lancaster in 1928, with US 222 replacing the route between Lancaster and Conowingo. The concurrent PA 41 designation was removed by 1930. The route was extended north to US 11/US 15/US 22/US 322 at Front and Maclay streets in Harrisburg in the 1930s. In 1949, US 230 was moved to a multilane alignment between Salunga and Lancaster. The route was moved to a freeway bypass north of Lancaster to end at US 30 east of Lancaster in 1953. US 230 was replaced with PA 230 in the 1960s, with the western terminus moved to its current location and the eastern terminus to an interchange with the US 30 freeway northwest of Lancaster, with US 30 replacing the route east of there. PA 230 was upgraded to a freeway between Salunga and Lancaster in 1969. The eastern terminus was cut to its current location by 1972 with PA 283 replacing the route on the freeway into Lancaster. The route extended along US 22 to the Interstate 81 (I-81)/US 322 interchange between the 1970s and 1980s.

== Route description ==
=== Dauphin County ===
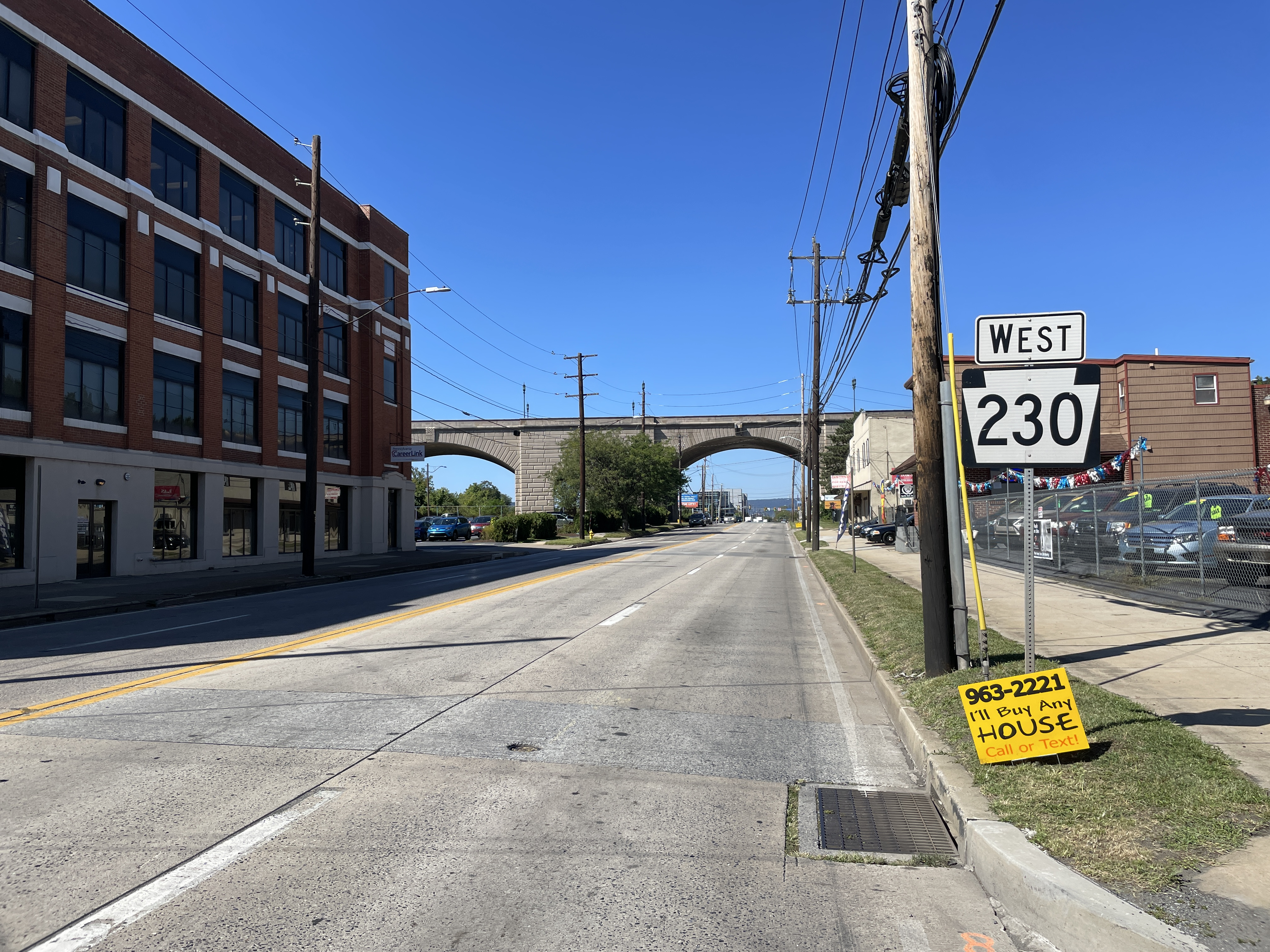
PA 230 westbound on Cameron Street in Harrisburg

PA 230 begins at US 22 at the intersection of Maclay Street, North Cameron Street and Arsenal Boulevard near the Pennsylvania Farm Show Complex & Expo Center in the city of Harrisburg in Dauphin County. From here, US 22 heads north (west) along North Cameron Street and east along Arsenal Boulevard while PA 230 heads south along North Cameron Street, a four-lane divided highway. The route passes through business and industrial areas, becoming a four-lane undivided road. The road continues south-southeast and heads under the State Street Bridge that carries State Street west into Downtown Harrisburg. PA 230 becomes South Cameron Street at the Market Street intersection and runs southeast past commercial development, passing under the Mulberry Street Bridge. The route crosses under Norfolk Southern's Harrisburg Line and comes to an intersection with Paxton Street, which provides access to I-83. A short distance past this intersection, the road passes under I-83 without an interchange. PA 230 heads through more commercial areas before it narrows to a three-lane road with two westbound lanes and one eastbound lane that runs past urban homes and industry. The route narrows to two lanes and crosses the Capital Area Greenbelt trail and Spring Creek before it leaves Harrisburg for Swatara Township, where it heads past commercial development. A short distance later, the road enters the borough of Steelton and becomes North Front Street, passing a mix of homes and businesses. PA 230 continues southeast through developed areas and runs through the commercial downtown of Steelton, becoming South Front Street at the Locust Street intersection. The route heads southeast between residential and business areas to the northeast and a large Cleveland-Cliffs steel mill to the southwest. The road continues through industrial areas and passes under a railroad spur serving the steel mill. PA 230 passes through wooded areas with a railroad spur, Norfolk Southern's Royalton Branch railroad line, Amtrak's Keystone Corridor railroad line, and the Susquehanna River to the southwest, curving east. The route continues past residential areas to the north and an industrial plant to the south.

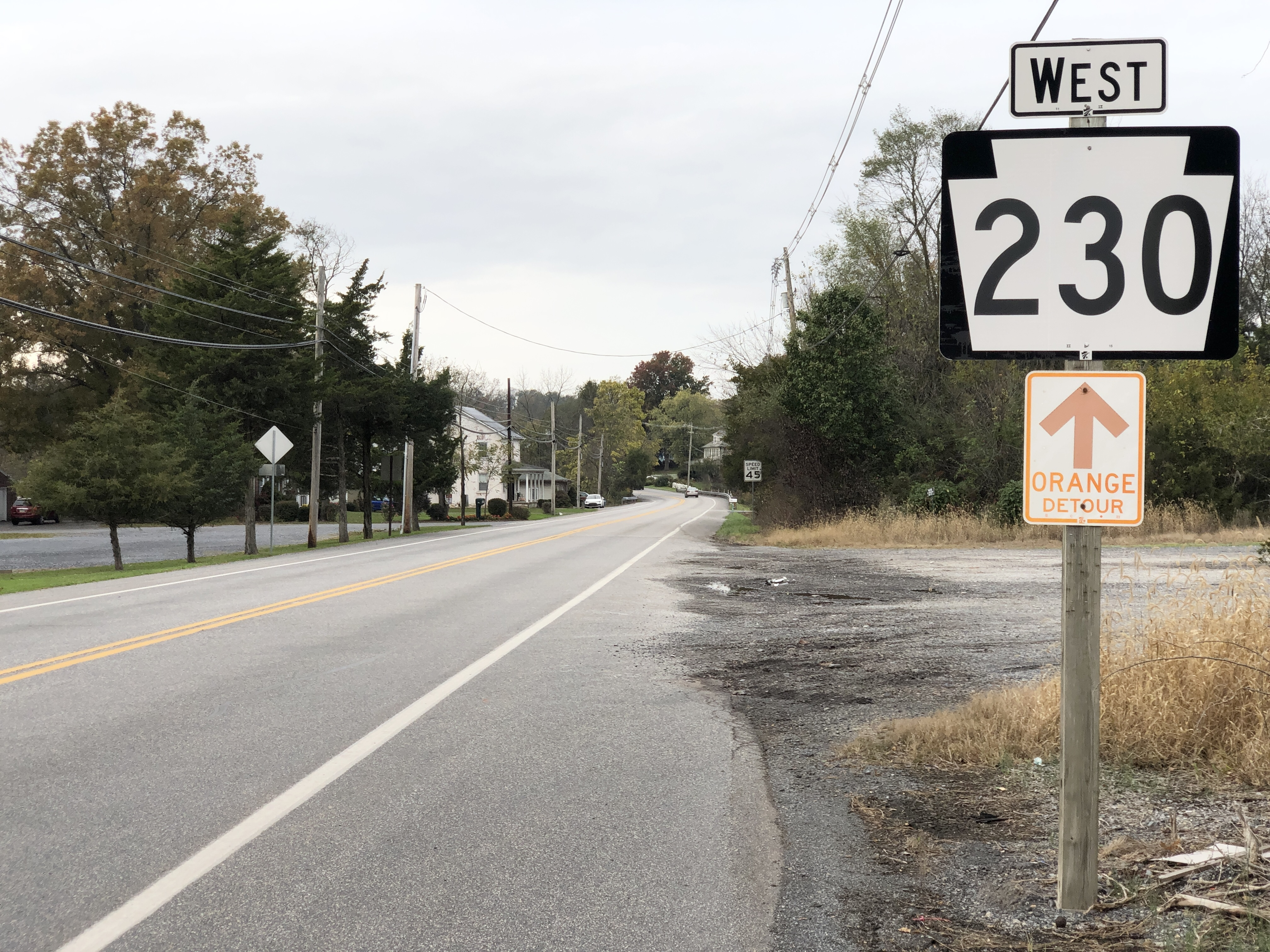
PA 230 westbound in Londonderry Township

PA 230 passes under the Susquehanna River Bridge carrying the Pennsylvania Turnpike (I-76) and continues southeast into the borough of Highspire along 2nd Street, running past homes and businesses. The road intersects Eisenhower Boulevard and continues through developed areas of the borough. The route gains a center left-turn lane and passes businesses before it leaves Highspire for Lower Swatara Township. At this point, PA 230 becomes Harrisburg Pike and continues east through commercial areas. The road widens to a four-lane divided highway and comes to a partial cloverleaf interchange with the Airport Connector freeway, which heads south to serve the Harrisburg International Airport. The route becomes parallel to Amtrak's Keystone Corridor and Norfolk Southern's Royalton Branch to the south of the road and continues through commercial development, transforming to a four-lane undivided road. PA 230 becomes the border between Lower Swatara Township to the north and the borough of Middletown to the south and crosses a Middletown and Hummelstown Railroad spur at-grade before it intersects PA 441 at Ann Street, at which point PA 441 becomes concurrent with PA 230. The road becomes West Main Street, a three-lane road with a center left-turn lane that passes north of the Middletown station along Amtrak's Keystone Corridor before it heads northeast away from the railroad tracks and fully enters Middletown. PA 230/PA 441 passes businesses before running through residential areas as a two-lane road. PA 441 splits from PA 230 by turning north onto North Union Street. From here, PA 230 continues along East Main Street past more homes and a few businesses, curving east. The route crosses the Middletown and Hummelstown Railroad at-grade before it comes to a bridge over the Swatara Creek.

Upon crossing the creek, the road enters Londonderry Township and becomes Harrisburg Pike, passing through farmland. PA 230 intersects the western terminus of PA 341, where it becomes concurrent with PA 341 Truck in the eastbound direction, and gains a center left-turn lane as it passes through wooded areas of homes. The route becomes a three-lane road with two eastbound lanes and one westbound lane and curves southeast. The road narrows to two lanes and comes to an intersection with Toll House Road, where PA 341 Truck splits north and heads a short distance to an interchange with the PA 283 freeway. PA 230 continues southeast through woodland with homes and fields, briefly gaining a second westbound lane. The route heads through farmland with some woods and development as a two-lane road, passing to the southwest of a golf course.

=== Lancaster County ===
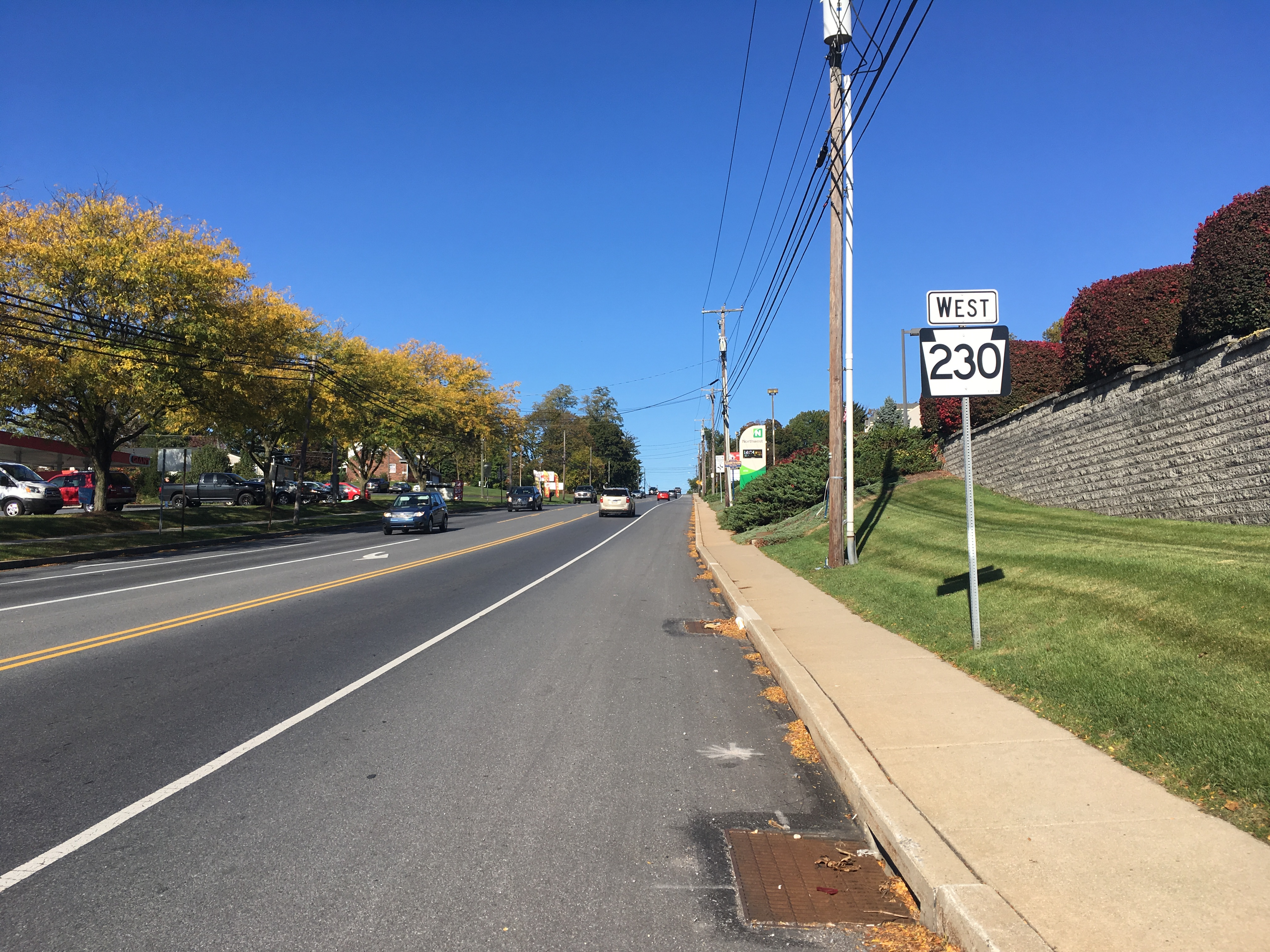
PA 230 westbound entering Elizabethtown

PA 230 crosses the Conewago Creek into Lancaster County, where the name becomes North Market Street and it forms the border between Mount Joy Township to the northeast and West Donegal Township to the southwest. The road runs through wooded areas with some development, passing the southern end of the Conewago Recreation Trail before curving east and briefly gaining a second eastbound lane. The route continues as a two-lane road and enters the borough of Elizabethtown, where it passes a few businesses before coming to a junction with PA 241/PA 743. At this point, PA 241/PA 743 join PA 230 for a concurrency, and the three routes continue southeast along North Market Street through residential areas. The road heads into the downtown area of Elizabethtown, where it crosses Conoy Creek and PA 241 splits to the southwest. PA 230/PA 743 continue along South Market Street out of the downtown, where the roadway gains a center left-turn lane and is lined with homes. PA 743 splits from PA 230 by turning southwest, and PA 230 continues along South Market Street past residences and businesses, forming the border between Elizabethtown to the north and West Donegal Township to the south. The route continues into Mount Joy Township and passes to the south of a shopping center in a commercial area before it continues through a mix of fields, trees, and commercial development.

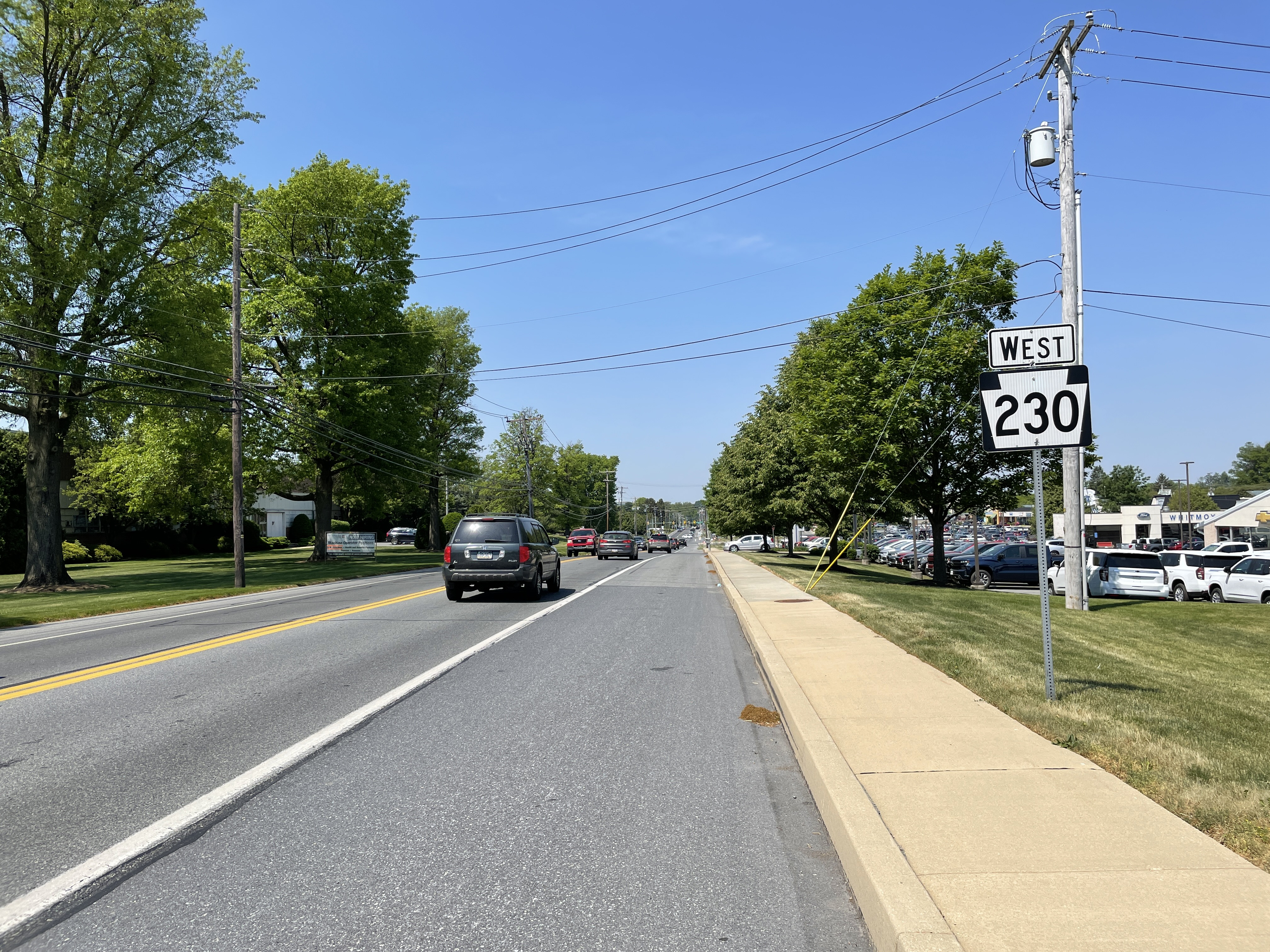
PA 230 westbound in Mount Joy

The road name changes to West Main Street at the Cloverleaf Road intersection north of the community of Rheems and it continues through rural land with some development a short distance to the north of Amtrak's Keystone Corridor. PA 230 heads southeast through farmland alongside the railroad tracks and becomes the border between Mount Joy Township to the north and East Donegal Township to the south before it heads away from the Amtrak line and enters the borough of Mount Joy. Here, the route passes businesses before it runs east into residential areas, narrowing to two lanes. The road passes more residential and commercial establishments and crosses a Norfolk Southern railroad spur at-grade before it reaches an intersection with PA 772. At this point, PA 772 becomes concurrent with PA 230 and the two routes head through the residential and commercial downtown of Mount Joy, becoming East Main Street at the Market Street intersection. PA 772 splits from PA 230 by heading southwest and PA 230 continues east along East Main Street past homes and a few businesses. The route crosses the Little Chiques Creek and runs past commercial development along with a few homes, becoming the border between Rapho Township to the north and Mount Joy to the south before fully entering Mount Joy again. The road heads into farmland with some residential and commercial development, forming the border between Rapho Township to the north and Mount Joy to the south prior to completely entering Rapho Township. Farther east, the route widens into a four-lane divided highway. PA 230 intersects Esbenshade Road, which provides access to westbound PA 283 and from eastbound PA 283, before it merges into the eastbound direction of the PA 283 freeway at a partial interchange with access to eastbound PA 283 and access from westbound PA 283 near the community of Salunga.

== History ==
U.S. Route 230
- Location: Harrisburg – Lancaster
- Existed: 1926–1966

On March 23, 1796, the Lancaster, Elizabethtown, and Middletown Turnpike Company was incorporated to build a private turnpike between Lancaster and Middletown via Elizabethtown. A new charter for the Lancaster and Middletown Turnpike was issued on March 5, 1804. Following the passage of the Sproul Road Bill in 1911, Legislative Route 129 was designated between Harrisburg and Lancaster, passing through Middletown, Elizabethtown, and Mount Joy.

With the creation of the U.S. Highway System on November 11, 1926, US 230, a spur of US 30, was designated to run from US 22/PA 3/PA 13 at Mulberry and Cameron streets in Harrisburg southeast to US 1 east of Conowingo, Maryland. The route headed southeast from Harrisburg through Middletown, Elizabethtown, and Mount Joy to Lancaster, where it turned south, passing through Quarryville and crossing the state line into Maryland before reaching its terminus. Between Harrisburg and Lancaster, US 230 ran concurrent with PA 41. A year later, PA 72 was designated concurrent with US 230 between Lancaster and the Maryland state line. In 1928, the eastern terminus of US 230 was cut back to US 30/PA 1 and US 222/PA 41/PA 72 at King and Prince streets in Lancaster, with a southern extension of US 222 replacing the US 230 designation between Lancaster and Conowingo. By 1930, the concurrent PA 41 designation was removed from US 230. At this time, US 230 began at US 22 at Mulberry Street in Harrisburg and headed out of the city on Cameron Street before continuing southeast through Middletown, Elizabethtown, and Mount Joy. The route followed Harrisburg Pike to Lancaster, where it ran southeast along Harrisburg Avenue and south along Prince Street to end at US 30 and US 222 at King Street.

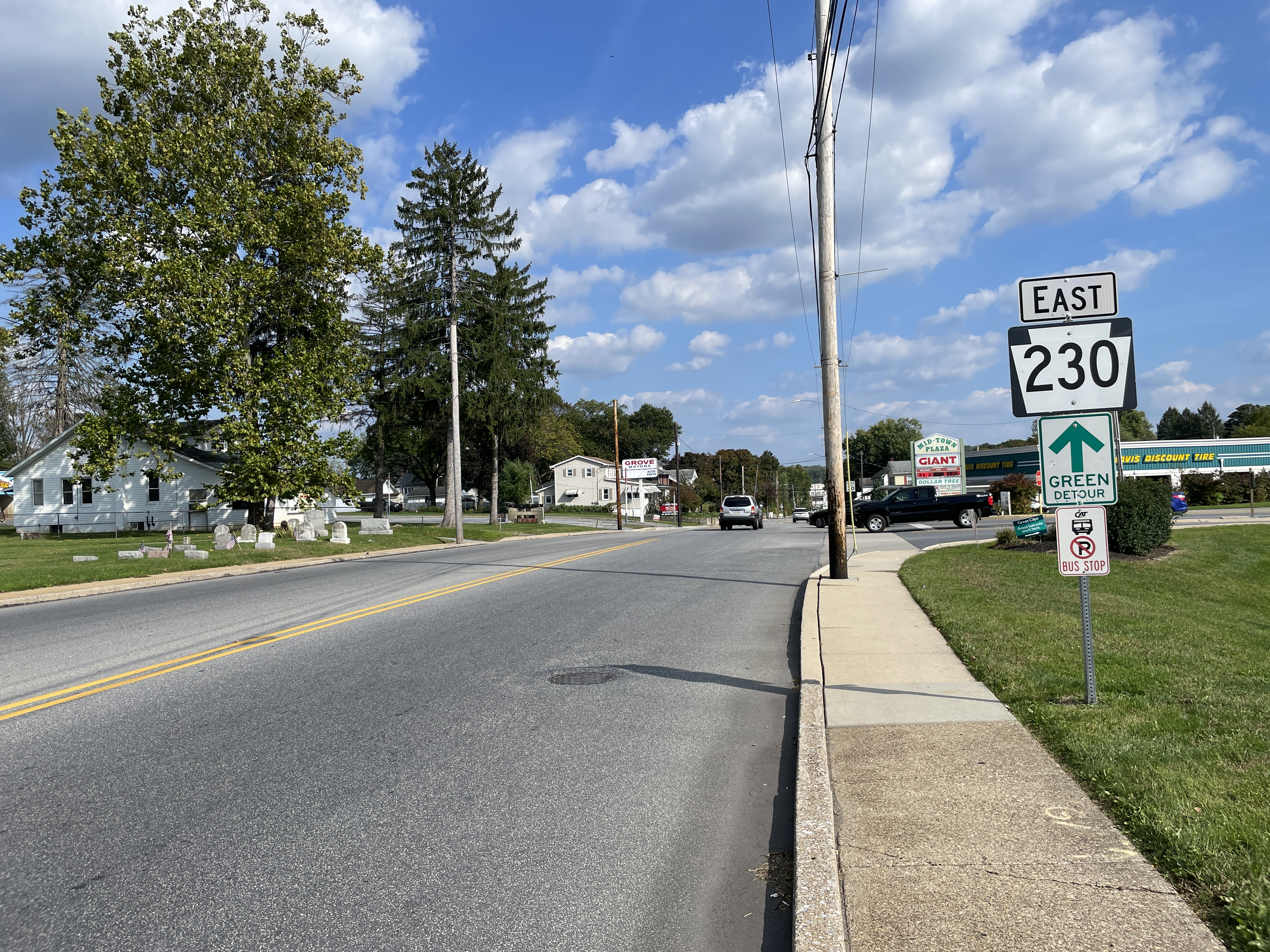
PA 230 eastbound in Middletown

US 230 was extended north to US 11/US 15/US 22/US 322 (Front Street) along the Susquehanna River in Harrisburg in the 1930s. The route continued north on Cameron Street and became concurrent with a rerouted US 22 at State Street. From here, the two routes headed north along Cameron Street and west on Maclay Street to Front Street. In the 1940s, the US 22 concurrency along Cameron Street was removed while the route became concurrent with US 22 Byp. along Maclay Street. In 1949, US 230 was shifted north to a new multilane alignment between Salunga and PA 72 north of Lancaster before it ran southwest on Dillerville Road, southeast on Harrisburg Avenue, and south on Prince Street. In 1953, US 230 was rerouted to head east to US 30 east of Lancaster along a newly-constructed freeway bypassing Lancaster to the north. The freeway began at the PA 72 interchange and continued east to US 30.

On June 28, 1965, the American Association of State Highway Officials (AASHO) approved the elimination of the US 230 designation. US 230 was decommissioned and replaced with PA 230. The western terminus of PA 230 was moved to US 22 Byp. (now US 22) at the intersection of Cameron Street, Maclay Street, and Arsenal Boulevard while the eastern terminus was at an interchange with the US 30 freeway northwest of Lancaster, with US 30 having replaced US 230 on the freeway running to the north of Lancaster. In 1969, PA 230 was upgraded to a freeway between Salunga and PA 72. By 1972, the eastern terminus of PA 230 was cut back to its current location, with PA 283 replacing the route on the freeway running east to US 30 in Lancaster. In the 1970s, PA 230 was extended north along US 22 to an interchange with I-81/US 322 at the northern edge of Harrisburg. The concurrency with US 22 was removed in the 1980s, leaving the western terminus at its current location.

== Major intersections ==
County	Location	mi	km	Destinations	Notes
Dauphin	Harrisburg	0.000	0.000	US 22 (Arsenal Boulevard / Cameron Street) to I-81	Western terminus
Dauphin	Lower Swatara Township	9.157– 9.182	14.737– 14.777	To PA 283 – Harrisburg International Airport, Harrisburg, Lancaster	Interchange; access via Airport Connector
Dauphin	Lower Swatara Township–Middletown line	10.315	16.600	PA 441 south (Ann Street) – Harrisburg International Airport	Western end of PA 441 concurrency
Dauphin	Middletown	10.788	17.362	PA 441 north (North Union Street)	Eastern end of PA 441 concurrency
Dauphin	Londonderry Township	12.230	19.682	PA 341 east (Colebrook Road) PA 341 Truck begins	Western terminus of PA 341; western end of PA 341 Truck concurrency eastbound
Dauphin	Londonderry Township	13.429	21.612	PA 341 Truck east (Toll House Road) to PA 283	Eastern end of PA 341 Truck concurrency eastbound
Lancaster	Elizabethtown	18.258	29.383	PA 241 north / PA 743 north (Linden Avenue) – Hershey	Western end of PA 241/PA 743 concurrency
Lancaster	Elizabethtown	18.776	30.217	PA 241 south (West High Street)	Eastern end of PA 241 concurrency
Lancaster	Elizabethtown	19.540	31.447	PA 743 south (Maytown Road) – Marietta	Eastern end of PA 743 concurrency
Lancaster	Mount Joy	24.829	39.958	PA 772 east (Manheim Street)	Western end of PA 772 concurrency
Lancaster	Mount Joy	25.197	40.551	PA 772 west (Marietta Avenue)	Eastern end of PA 772 concurrency
Lancaster	Rapho Township	28.355	45.633	PA 283 east – Lancaster	Eastern terminus
1.000 mi = 1.609 km; 1.000 km = 0.621 mi: Concurrency terminus

== U.S. Route 230 Bypass ==
U.S. Route 230 Bypass
- Location: Harrisburg – Highspire
- Existed: 1951–1961

U.S. Route 230 Bypass (US 230 Byp.) was a bypass of the section of US 230 that ran through the city of Harrisburg. The route began at US 230 and US 22 Byp. at the intersection of Cameron Street, Maclay Street, and Arsenal Boulevard in the northern part of Harrisburg near the Farm Show Complex. US 230 Byp. headed southeast concurrent with US 22 Byp. along Arsenal Boulevard, passing to the south of Harrisburg State Hospital. The two routes turned east-northeast onto Herr Street and continued to an intersection with US 22 (Walnut Street) near Penbrook, where US 22 Byp. ended. US 230 Byp. continued northeast concurrent with US 22, passing through Progress and widening into a divided highway. US 230 Byp. split from US 22 by heading south on a freeway. The route came to an interchange with Derry Street near Oakleigh before the freeway ended at an intersection with US 322/US 422. US 230 Byp. continued southeast as an undivided surface road and crossed PA 441 near Oberlin before reaching the Harrisburg East interchange with the Pennsylvania Turnpike (I-80S). The bypass route continued south and ended at an intersection with US 230 in Highspire.

In 1951, AASHO approved the establishment of US 230 Byp. The freeway section of the route between US 22 and US 322/US 422 was constructed in 1953. On November 25, 1960, AASHO approved the elimination of the US 230 Byp. designation. US 230 Byp. was decommissioned in 1961. The route became solely US 22 Byp. (now US 22) along Arsenal Boulevard and Herr Street, solely US 22 along Walnut Street, I-83 along the freeway between US 22 and US 322, and PA 283 along Eisenhower Boulevard between US 322 and US 230. PA 283 was removed from Eisenhower Boulevard by 1970, with I-283 built parallel to the road.

Major intersections

The entire route was in Dauphin County.

Location	mi	km	Destinations	Notes
Harrisburg			US 230 / US 22 Byp. west (Cameron Street/Maclay Street)	Western terminus; west end of US 22 Byp. overlap
Penbrook			US 22 west (Walnut Street)	East end of US 22 Byp. overlap; west end of US 22 overlap
Lower Paxton Township			US 22 east (Jonestown Road)	East end of US 22 overlap
Swatara Township			Derry Street	Interchange
Swatara Township			US 322 / US 422	
Swatara Township			PA 441 (Highland Street)	
Lower Swatara Township			I-80S / Penna Turnpike	I-80S/Penna Turnpike exit 19
Highspire			US 230 (2nd Street)	Eastern terminus
1.000 mi = 1.609 km; 1.000 km = 0.621 mi: Concurrency terminus
