= Pennsylvania Route 441 =

State highway in Pennsylvania, US

Pennsylvania Route 441
- PA 441 in red

Route information
- Maintained by PennDOT
- Length: 32.490 mi (52.288 km)

Major junctions
- South end: PA 999 in Manor Township
- US 30 in Columbia; PA 23 in Marietta; PA 772 near Marietta PA 743 near Marietta; PA 241 near Bainbridge; PA 230 in Middletown; PA 283 in Swatara Township; I-283 in Swatara Township
- North end: SR 3010 near Harrisburg

Location
- Country: United States
- State: Pennsylvania
- Counties: Lancaster, Dauphin

Highway system
- Pennsylvania State Route System; Interstate; US; State; Scenic; Legislative
← PA 439	→ PA 442

Pennsylvania Route 441 (PA 441) is a 32-mile-long (51 km) state route that is located in central Pennsylvania in the United States. It primarily parallels the Susquehanna River through Lancaster and Dauphin counties.

The southern terminus is situated at PA 999 in the Manor Township hamlet of Washington Boro. The northern terminus is located at Paxton Street in Harrisburg.

This route heads north from Washington Boro to Columbia, where it intersects U.S. Route 30 (US 30). PA 441 continues up the river to Marietta and turns west, heading northwest past Bainbridge before leaving Lancaster County for Dauphin County. Here, the route continues north and passes along the east side of the former Three Mile Island Nuclear Generating Station before passing through the boroughs of Royalton and Middletown. Past Middletown, PA 441 heads away from the Susquehanna River and continues northwest, intersecting the PA 283 freeway indirectly and then Interstate 283 (I-283). The route passes through Oberlin before it comes to its northern terminus on the eastern edge of Harrisburg.

PA 441 was assigned in 1928 between Washington Boro and US 22 at Paxton Street in Harrisburg. The route was fully paved in the 1930s, with US 322/US 422 replacing US 22 along Paxton Street at the northern terminus. In the 1950s and 1960s, the sections of PA 441 between Columbia and Marietta, through Marietta, and through Bainbridge were bypassed. Also, PA 999 was extended to the southern terminus of the route in Washington Boro while US 322/US 422 were removed at the northern terminus in the 1960s. The route was realigned in the vicinity of a newly constructed interchange with I-283 in 1969, with the original alignment severed by I-283. A new alignment of the route closer to the Susquehanna River in Columbia bypassing city streets was completed in 2015 and the route was realigned in Middletown by 2021.

== Route description ==
=== Lancaster County ===
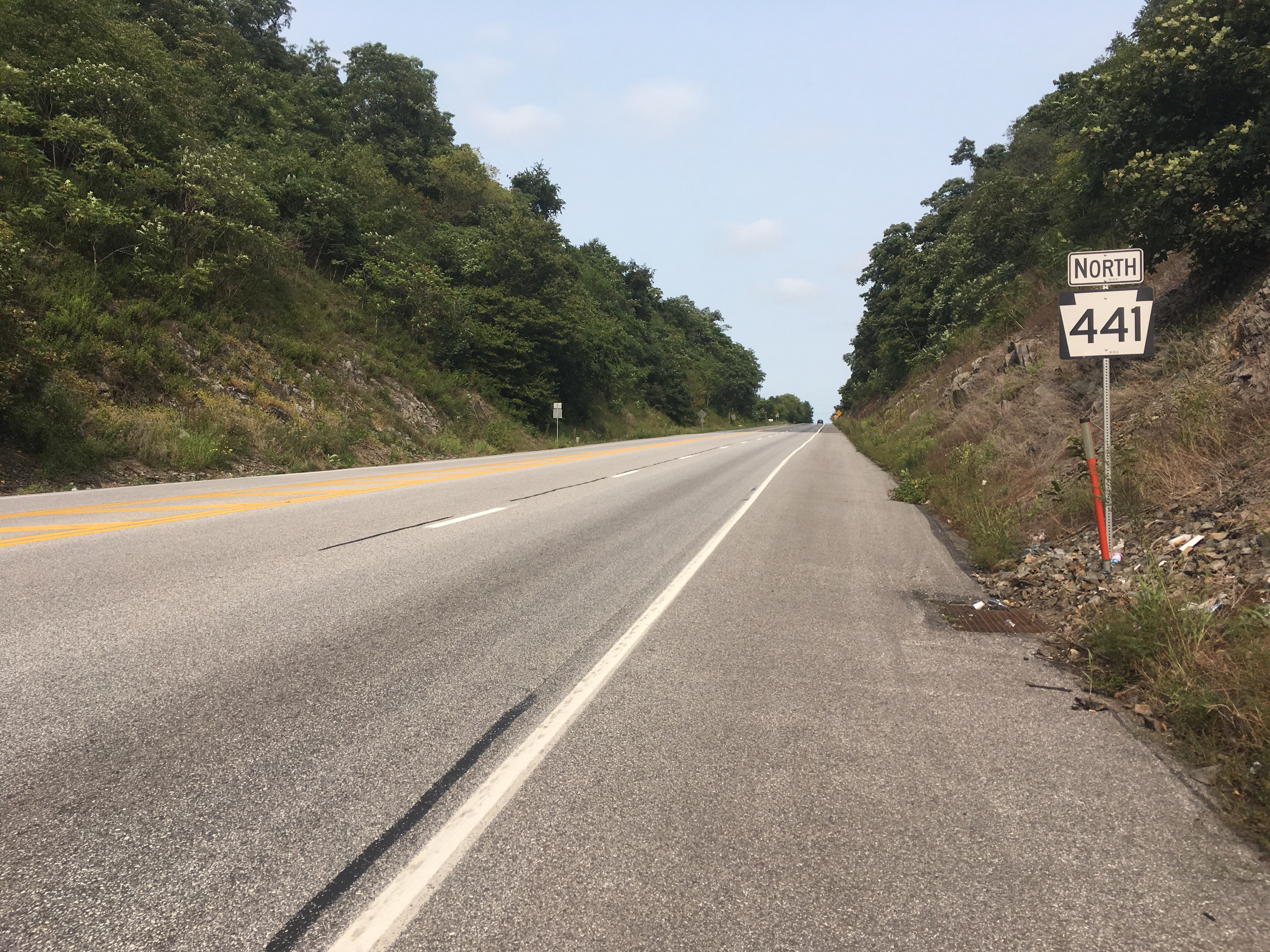
PA 441 northbound past US 30 in Columbia

PA 441 begins at an intersection with the western terminus of PA 999 in the community of Washington Boro, located on the east bank of the Susquehanna River in Manor Township, Lancaster County. From here, the route heads north-northwest on two-lane undivided Water Street. The road runs between the Susquehanna River and Norfolk Southern's Port Road Branch railroad line to the west and homes to the east. PA 441 heads out of Washington Boro and runs northwest through wooded areas with some homes alongside the railroad tracks and the river.

The route passes through a small section of West Hempfield Township before it enters the borough of Columbia, where the name becomes South Front Street. The road runs between the Port Road Branch to the southwest and Norfolk Southern's Columbia Secondary to the northeast as it heads into commercial areas and open lots. PA 441 crosses the Columbia Secondary at-grade and continues northwest along North Front Street through industrial areas. The route passes under the Columbia–Wrightsville Bridge that carries PA 462 over the Susquehanna River.

PA 441 continues past industry to the east of the Northwest Lancaster County River Trail, the railroad tracks, and the river before it reaches an interchange with the US 30 freeway, at which point it turns north. Past this interchange, PA 441 crosses into West Hempfield Township and becomes Chickies Hill Road, a three-lane undivided road with two northbound lanes and one southbound lane. The route runs north through forested areas and then a mix of homes and fields as it ascends a hill. The road narrows to two lanes and heads into forests as it passes to the east of Chickies Rock County Park, curving to the northwest.

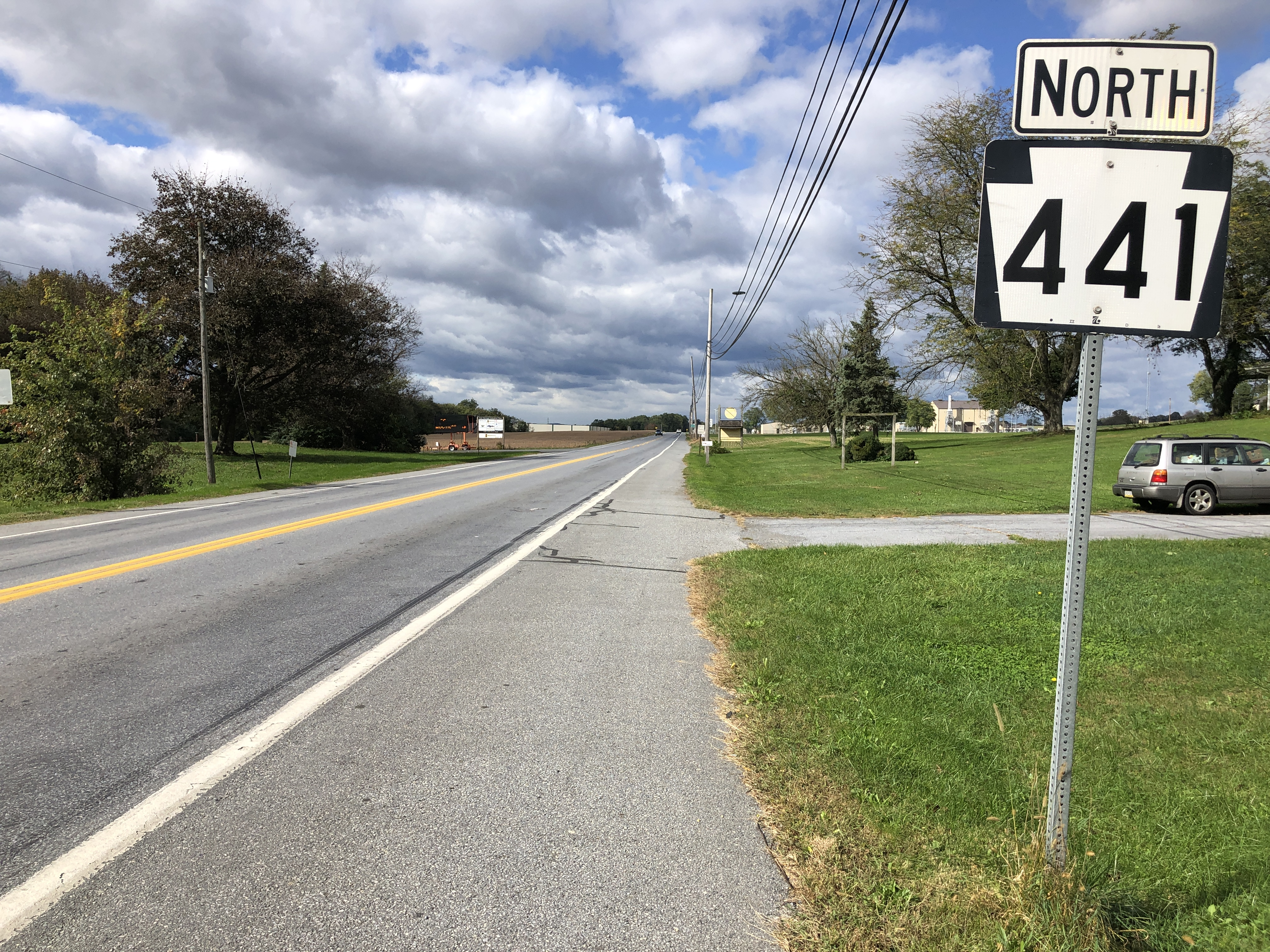
PA 441 northbound past PA 743 in East Donegal Township

PA 441 crosses the Chiques Creek near the community of Chickies and becomes the border between the borough of Marietta to the southwest and East Donegal Township to the northeast. The route becomes River Road and passes through wooded areas with some homes, coming to an intersection with the western terminus of PA 23. The road fully enters East Donegal Township and curves west through residential and commercial areas with some fields, bypassing Marietta to the north.

PA 441 intersects the western terminus of PA 772 and continues through a mix of farmland and development. The route comes to a junction with the southern terminus of PA 743 and leaves the Marietta area, passing through agricultural areas with some homes and commercial areas and heading to the north of a large industrial complex. The road curves southwest and reaches the residential community of Shocks Mills, where it turns northwest. PA 441 runs through farmland and crosses into Conoy Township, where it heads through a mix of farms and woods with some homes, passing to the north of a Reworld waste-to-energy plant, and curves north-northwest.

The route crosses Conoy Creek and runs through the eastern part of the residential community of Bainbridge, turning northwest into farmland to intersect the southern terminus of PA 241. The road continues northwest through a mix of fields and woods with some homes, becoming closely parallel with Norfolk Southern's Royalton Branch railroad line. PA 441 and the railroad line curve north and the route heads through the residential community of Falmouth a short distance to the east of the Susquehanna River.

=== Dauphin County ===
PA 441 crosses the Conewago Creek into Londonderry Township in Dauphin County and continues north between farmland and some woods to the east and the Norfolk Southern Royalton Branch and the Susquehanna River to the west.

The route passes to the east of Three Mile Island, which is the location of the former Three Mile Island Nuclear Generating Station, the site of a partial nuclear meltdown in 1979. Past the former nuclear power plant, the road curves northwest and then north as it runs through wooded areas of homes with the river and railroad tracks to the west of the road.

PA 441 crosses the Royalton Branch at-grade and enters the borough of Royalton, heading northwest through residential areas along Canal Street. The route becomes parallel to Amtrak's Keystone Corridor railroad line to the east and crosses the Swatara Creek into the borough of Middletown. Here, PA 441 follows Ann Street northwest and intersects South Union Street, passing through residential areas.

The road curves north and comes to a bridge over Norfolk Southern's Royalton Branch, Amtrak's Keystone Corridor, and the Middletown and Hummelstown Railroad at the Middletown station serving the Amtrak line before it reaches an intersection with PA 230. At this point, PA 441 turns east to form a concurrency with PA 230 along West Main Street, a three-lane road with a center left-turn lane, running along the border between Lower Swatara Township to the north and Middletown to the south. The road passes north of the Middletown station along Amtrak's Keystone Corridor before it heads northeast away from the railroad tracks and fully enters Middletown. PA 230/PA 441 passes businesses before running through residential areas as a two-lane road.

PA 441 splits from PA 230 by turning north onto North Union Street. The route passes more homes and heads to the east of a cemetery, becoming the border between Lower Swatara Township to the west and the borough of Middletown to the east as it continues north and comes to a bridge over the Pennsylvania Turnpike (I-76).

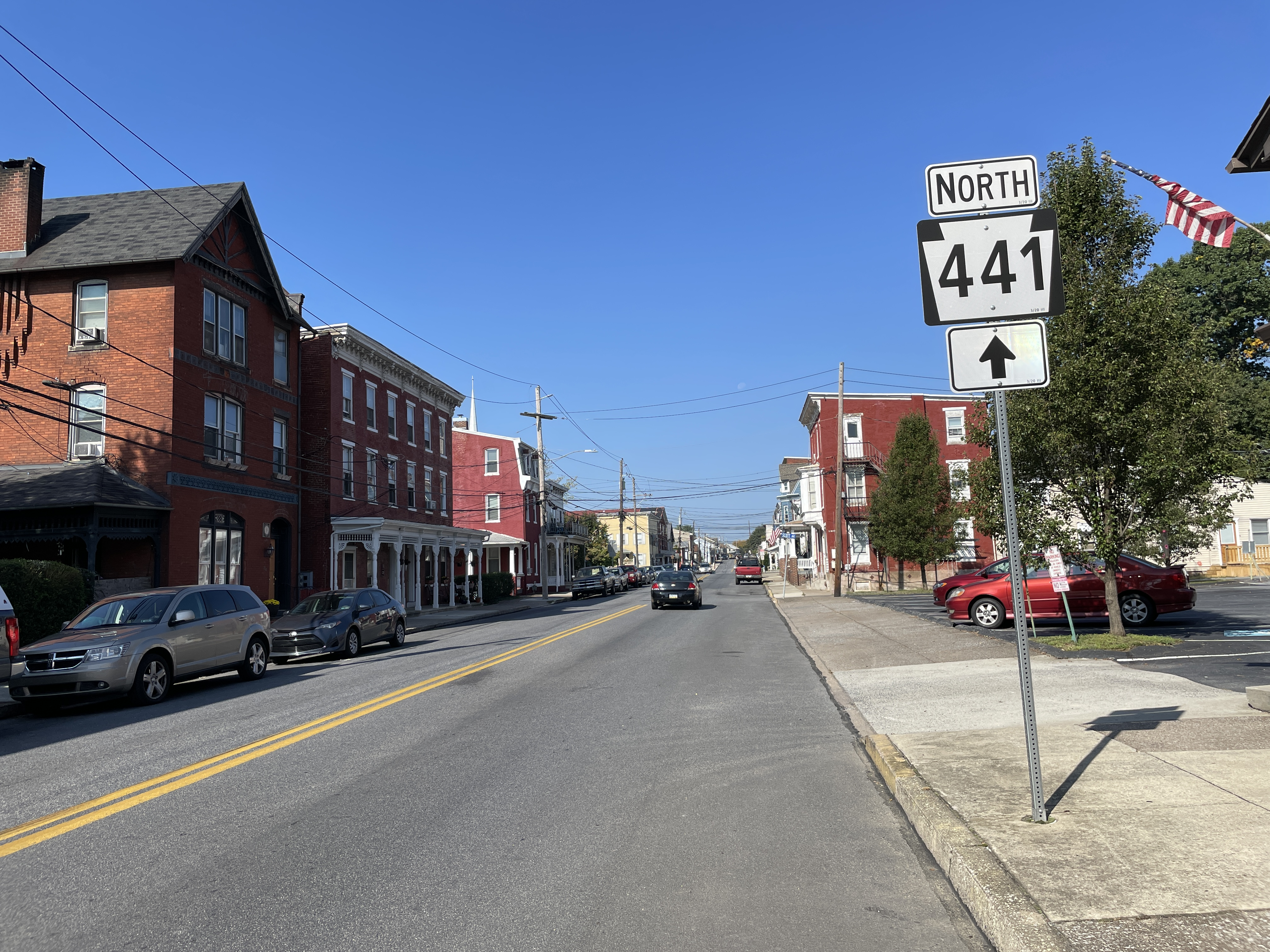
PA 441 northbound in Middletown

PA 441 curves northwest and fully enters Lower Swatara Township, where the name becomes Oberlin Road. The road passes north of Middletown Area High School and winds northwest through a mix of farm fields and woods with some homes.

The route turns north and comes to a bridge over the PA 283 freeway at its interchange with the northern terminus of the Airport Connector, with PA 441 passing over PA 283 on the same bridge as the ramps connecting to the Airport Connector from PA 283. PA 441 has access to PA 283 by way of Fulling Mill Road to the north of the interchange, which heads west to a ramp to westbound PA 283 and east to North Union Street, which heads south to intersect PA 283 at a diamond interchange. PA 441 has no direct access to the Airport Connector.

From here, the route heads north as a brief divided highway near the Fulling Mill Road intersection before it again becomes a two-lane undivided road and turns west into residential areas in the community of Ebenezer. The road continues west-northwest through a mix of farmland and homes before it crosses Laurel Run into Swatara Township. PA 441 becomes Lindle Road and runs through more farms and trees before continuing west into business areas as a four-lane road.

The route comes to an interchange with I-283, at which point it becomes a divided highway. Past this, PA 441 turns southeast onto Eisenhower Boulevard, a three-lane road with a center left-turn lane that passes businesses. The route turns west onto two-lane undivided Highland Street and passes through fields before it comes to the residential community of Oberlin.

PA 441 turns northwest onto North Harrisburg Street and heads past more homes, running through the community of Oberlin Gardens. The road passes between woods to the southwest and commercial development to the northeast and turns west, passing to the south of the former Harrisburg Mall. The route crosses Spring Creek and the Capital Area Greenbelt trail and curves north past more commercial development along South 28th Street before it turns west onto Sycamore Street. PA 441 continues past businesses and comes to its northern terminus at an intersection with SR 3010 (Paxton Street) to the east of the Harrisburg city line.

== History ==
When Pennsylvania first legislated routes in 1911, the road between Columbia and Marietta was designated as part of Legislative Route 280, which continued north to Maytown, west to Bainbridge, and northeast to Lebanon. The road between Columbia and Marietta was paved by 1926. PA 441 was designated in 1928 to run from Washington Boro north to US 22 (Paxton Street) in Harrisburg. At this time, the route was paved between Washington Boro and Marietta, Bainbridge and Falmouth, and Royalton and Middletown, while the road to the northwest of Middletown was under construction. In the 1930s, the entire length of PA 441 was paved. Also, the northern terminus at Paxton Street was with US 322/US 422, which replaced that portion of US 22 which was realigned to the north.

In 1959, PA 441 was moved to bypass Bainbridge to the east, having previously followed 2nd Street through the community. In the 1950s, the route was shifted west to a straight alignment between Columbia and Marietta instead of bending east along what is now Old Chickies Hill Road. Also, PA 999 was extended to the southern terminus of PA 441 in Washington Boro. In 1961, the route was realigned to bypass Marietta to the north instead of heading through the borough along Market Street. In 1969, PA 441 was realigned from Highland Street east of Oberlin to follow its present alignment along Oberlin Road and Eisenhower Boulevard to intersect I-283 at an interchange. The former alignment along Highland Street is now severed by I-283. Also, the US 322/US 422 designation was removed at the northern terminus in the 1960s, leaving PA 441 terminating at unnumbered Paxton Street.

In July 2014, construction of a bypass for PA 441 around the community of Columbia began. PA 441 originally passed through the town on Locust Street and 3rd Street, however the road saw high levels of truck traffic, spurring interest in realigning the route away from the center of town. The bypass travels closer along the Susquehanna River, passing under PA 462, before passing over US 30 and resuming its present course. The PA 441 bypass, which cost $11.8 million, was opened to traffic on December 17, 2015. By 2021, PA 441 was realigned in Middletown to bypass the town to the west along the alignment of PA 441 Truck.

== Major intersections ==
County	Location	mi	km	Destinations	Notes
Lancaster	Manor Township	0.000	0.000	PA 999 east (Penn Street) – Millersville, Lancaster	Southern terminus; western terminus of PA 999
Lancaster	Columbia	4.110	6.614	US 30 – York, Lancaster	Interchange
Lancaster	Marietta–East Donegal Township line	6.386	10.277	PA 23 east (Marietta Avenue) – Lancaster	Western terminus of PA 23
Lancaster	East Donegal Township	7.106	11.436	PA 772 east (Mount Joy Road) – Mt. Joy	Western terminus of PA 772
Lancaster	East Donegal Township	8.089	13.018	PA 743 north (Maytown Road) – Maytown, Elizabethtown	Southern terminus of PA 743
Lancaster	Conoy Township	14.823	23.855	PA 241 north (Bainbridge Road) – Elizabethtown	Southern terminus of PA 241
Dauphin	Lower Swatara Township–Middletown line	23.017	37.042	PA 230 west (Harrisburg Pike)	Southern end of PA 230 concurrency
Dauphin	Middletown	23.490	37.803	PA 230 east (East Main Street)	Northern end of PA 230 concurrency
Dauphin	Lower Swatara Township	26.052	41.927	PA 283 north – Harrisburg	Interchange; access via Fulling Mill Road
Dauphin	Swatara Township	29.166	46.938	I-283 to I-76 / Penna Turnpike – Highspire, Harrisburg	Exit 2 on I-283
Dauphin	Swatara Township	32.490	52.288	Paxton Street (SR 3010)	Northern terminus
1.000 mi = 1.609 km; 1.000 km = 0.621 mi: Concurrency terminus

== PA 441 Truck ==
Pennsylvania Route 441 Truck
- Location: Middletown
- Length: 1.0 mi (1.6 km)

Pennsylvania Route 441 Truck (PA 441 Truck) was a 1.0-mile-long (1.6 km) truck route of PA 441 in Middletown. The route avoided a low-overhead clearance railroad bridge and a hilly approach into the downtown along PA 441 along Union Street, which is complicated by parallel parking on each side of the street. PA 441 Truck ran northwest along Ann Street before heading east concurrent with PA 230. By 2021, PA 441 Truck was replaced with a realigned PA 441.
