= Conoy =

Conoy can refer to:

- Conoy tribe, also called the Piscataway tribe
- Conoy Creek, a stream in Lancaster County, Pennsylvania
- Piscataway language, also known as Conoy
- Conoy Township, Lancaster County, Pennsylvania
- Leoben Conoy, a character in the 2003 series of Battlestar Galactica
