= Pennsylvania Route 283 =

State highway in Pennsylvania, US

Pennsylvania Route 283
- SR 0300
- PA 283 highlighted in red

Route information
- Maintained by PennDOT
- Length: 29.112 mi (46.851 km)
- Existed: 1971–present

Major junctions
- West end: S. Eisenhower Blvd. near Highspire
- I-76 Toll / Penna Turnpike / I-283 near Highspire; Airport Connector in Lower Swatara Township; PA 743 / PA 341 Truck near Elizabethtown; PA 772 near Mount Joy; PA 230 near Mount Joy; PA 722 near East Petersburg; PA 72 near Lancaster
- East end: US 30 in Lancaster

Location
- Country: United States
- State: Pennsylvania
- Counties: Dauphin, Lancaster

Highway system
- Pennsylvania State Route System; Interstate; US; State; Scenic; Legislative
← I-283	→ PA 284
← PA 299	SR 300	→ PA 301

Pennsylvania Route 283 (PA 283), officially State Route 0300 or SR 0300 due to the presence of Interstate 283 (I-283), is a 29-mile-long (47 km) freeway in the U.S. state of Pennsylvania. It connects Harrisburg to Lancaster, paralleling the old U.S. Route 230 (US 230, now partly PA 230). The route follows a generally northwest–southeast direction but is signed east–west. The number was assigned based on the function the route serves as a southeastern extension of I-283, but I-283 and PA 283 are not the same roadway; the two intersect at a partial cloverleaf interchange.

Because it is a distinct route from I-283, it is one of only several state routes in Pennsylvania to use a different Location Referencing System designation from its signed number.

== Route description ==
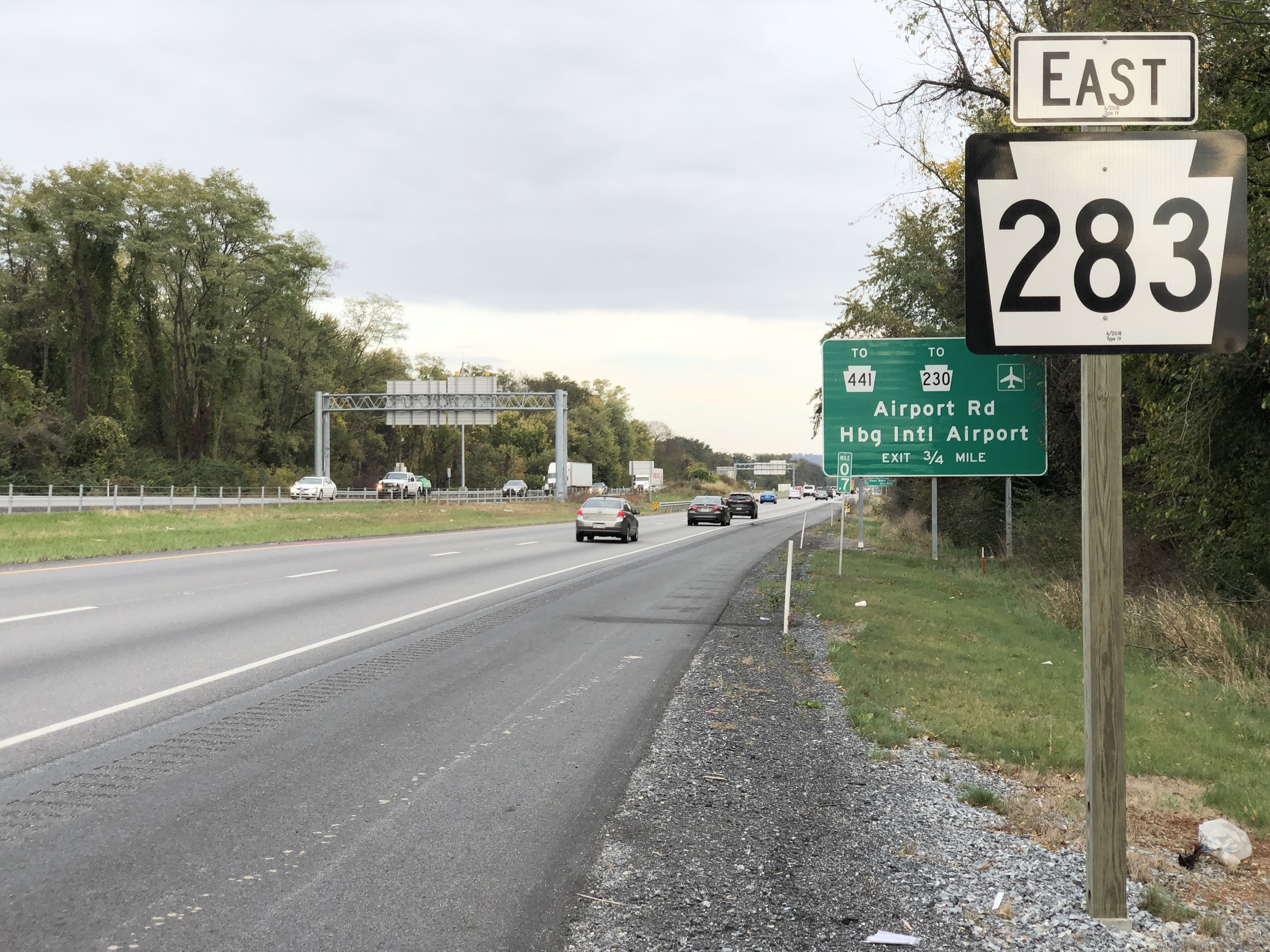
PA 283 eastbound past I-283 in Lower Swatara Township

PA 283 begins at an at-grade intersection with Eisenhower Boulevard north of the borough of Highspire in Lower Swatara Township in Dauphin County; Eisenhower Boulevard heads south to provide access to PA 230. From this intersection, the route heads northeast as a four-lane divided highway and intersects I-283 at a partial cloverleaf interchange; I-283 heads south to connect to the Harrisburg East interchange of the Pennsylvania Turnpike (I-76). East of I-283, the road becomes a freeway and the median widens as it continues to the east, passing through a mix of farm fields and residential and commercial development. PA 283 meets the northern terminus of Airport Connector freeway connecting to Harrisburg International Airport at a trumpet interchange which also provides access to PA 441 via an eastbound exit and westbound entrance. Past this interchange, the freeway runs between industrial areas to the north and farms and woods to the south, reaching a diamond interchange with North Union Street that indirectly connects to Fulling Mill Road. The route comes to a bridge over the Middletown and Hummelstown Railroad and the Swatara Creek, at which point it enters Londonderry Township. PA 283 meets Vine Street at a partial cloverleaf interchange in a business area; Vine Street provides access to the borough of Middletown to the south and the borough of Hummelstown to the north. Past this interchange, the freeway curves south-southeast through wooded areas with some fields and homes, passing over the Pennsylvania Turnpike. The route continues southeast through rural areas and passes over PA 341 before it curves east and comes to a partial cloverleaf interchange with Toll House Road which connects to PA 341 to the north and PA 230 to the south. At this point, eastbound PA 283 becomes concurrent with eastbound PA 341 Truck. The freeway heads east through farmland with some woods and homes, crossing into Conewago Township and curving to the east-southeast.

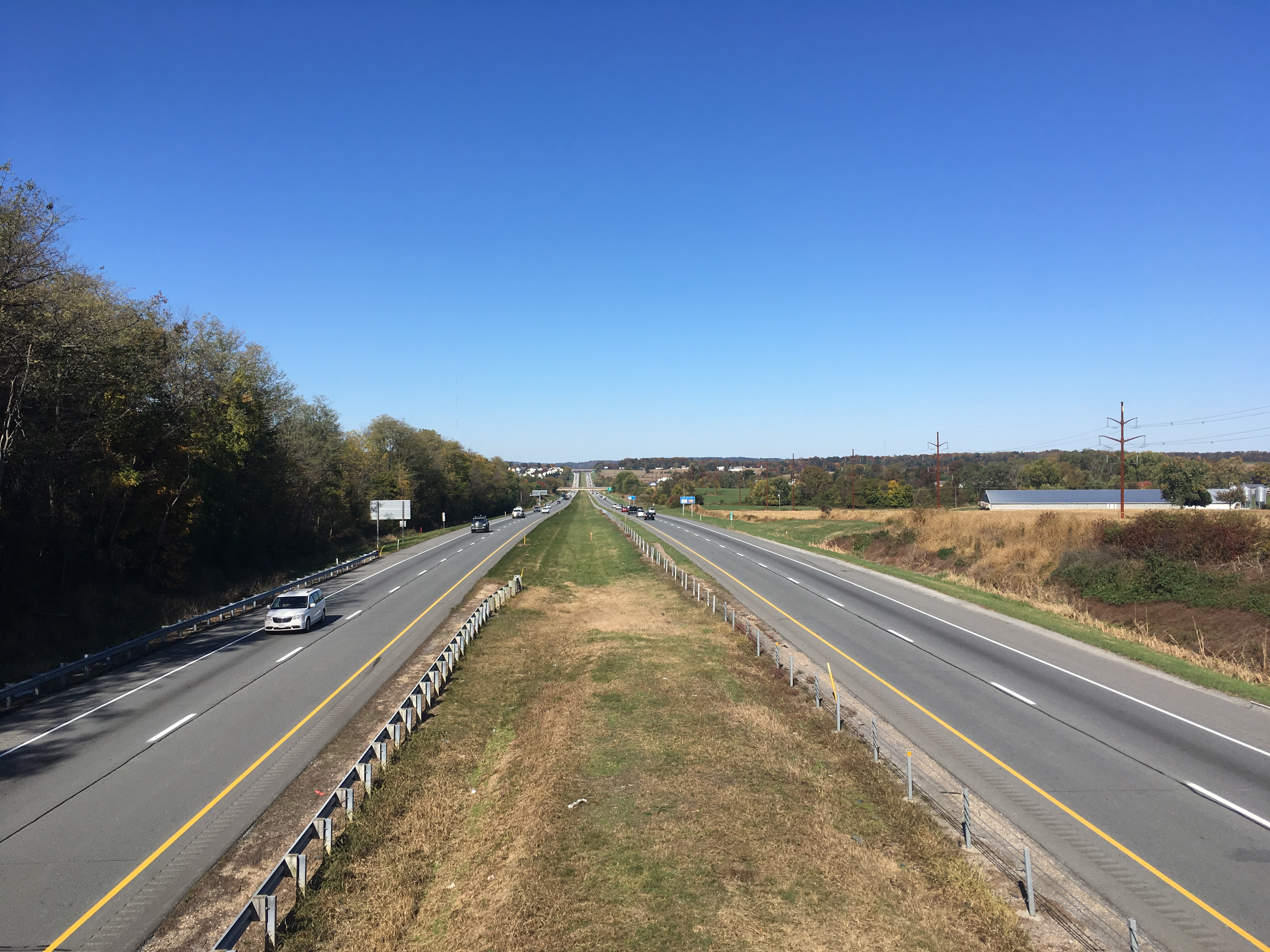
PA 283 westbound in Mount Joy Township

PA 283 crosses the Conewago Creek into Mount Joy Township in Lancaster County and continues southeast through farmland, passing over the Conewago Recreation Trail before coming to a diamond interchange with PA 743 that serves the borough of Elizabethtown to the south. PA 341 Truck splits from PA 283 at this interchange by heading north on PA 743. Past this interchange, the freeway crosses under PA 241 with no connection and passes to the northeast of Elizabethtown, heading between farmland to the northeast and residential development in Elizabethtown to the southwest and crossing Conoy Creek. The route heads through farm fields with some homes and commercial development, coming to a diamond interchange with Cloverleaf Road that serves the community of Rheems to the south. PA 283 continues through agricultural areas with some development and curves east, crossing Little Chiques Creek into Rapho Township. Here, the freeway curves southeast and comes to a diamond interchange with PA 772 that serves the borough of Mount Joy to the southwest. Following this interchange, the route runs between farmland to the northeast and industrial areas to the southwest, coming to an eastbound exit and westbound entrance with Esbenshade Road before it reaches a westbound exit and eastbound entrance with the eastern terminus of PA 230 on Harrisburg Pike.

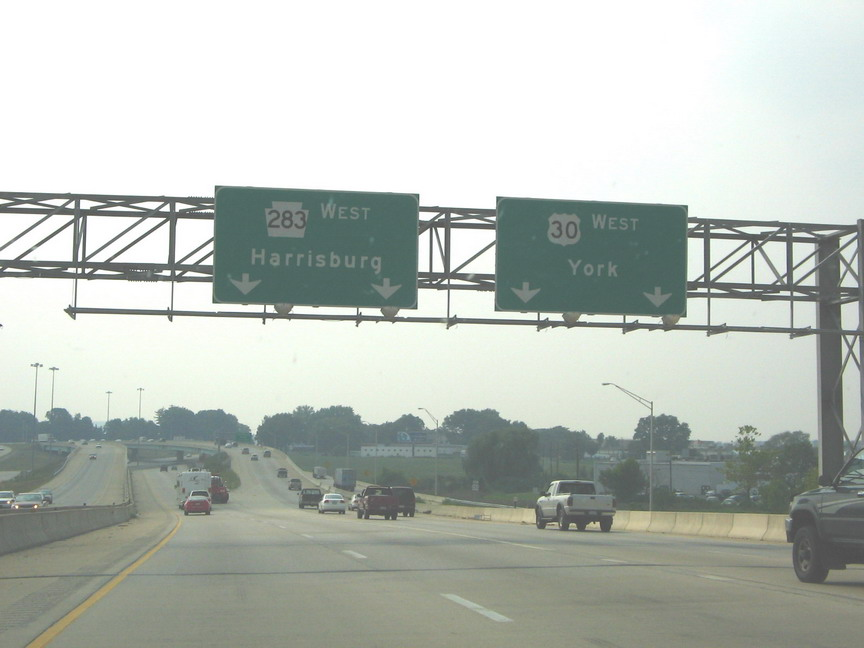
US 30 westbound approaching the beginning of PA 283 westbound in Lancaster

After the PA 230 interchange, the median of the freeway narrows to a Jersey barrier with no shoulder. PA 283 crosses Chiques Creek into East Hempfield Township and comes to a diamond interchange with Spooky Nook Road that serves the community of Salunga to the south. The route passes near industrial development before it runs east-southeast between farm fields to the north and residential and commercial development to the south, passing north of the community of Landisville. Along this stretch, the road is separated from the developed area to the south by woods and Amtrak's Keystone Corridor railroad line. The freeway reaches a diamond interchange with the western terminus of PA 722 that provides access to Landisville. Following this interchange, PA 283 continues through farmland with some commercial development, with the Amtrak line heading further to the south. The route passes over Norfolk Southern's Lititz Secondary railroad line before it comes to an interchange with PA 741, at which point it crosses Little Conestoga Creek into Manheim Township. Past here, the freeway widens to six lanes and runs through industrial areas, coming to a partial cloverleaf interchange with PA 72. The route continues past a field to the northeast and commercial development to the southwest. After crossing into the city of Lancaster, PA 283 reaches its eastern terminus at an interchange with the US 30 freeway, which also provides access to Fruitville Pike.

== History ==
=== Berks County ===
PA 283 was first designated in 1928 on an approximately 1-mile (1.6 km) road connecting PA 83 (today PA 724) to US 422 across the Schuylkill River in Berks County. The route was decommissioned in 1946.

=== Eisenhower Boulevard ===
In 1961, the designation was revived in the Harrisburg suburbs. It was designated on a section of Eisenhower Boulevard between then-US 230 and the temporary end of Interstate 83 (the site of the Eisenhower Interchange today), replacing the retired US 230 Bypass route. This was only temporary designation, however, as an interstate highway connector between the Pennsylvania Turnpike and Interstate 83 was being built. The new interstate was built parallel to Eisenhower Boulevard. In 1969, two years ahead of its opening, it was designated I-283, and the PA 283 designation on Eisenhower Boulevard was deleted.

=== Harrisburg to Lancaster ===
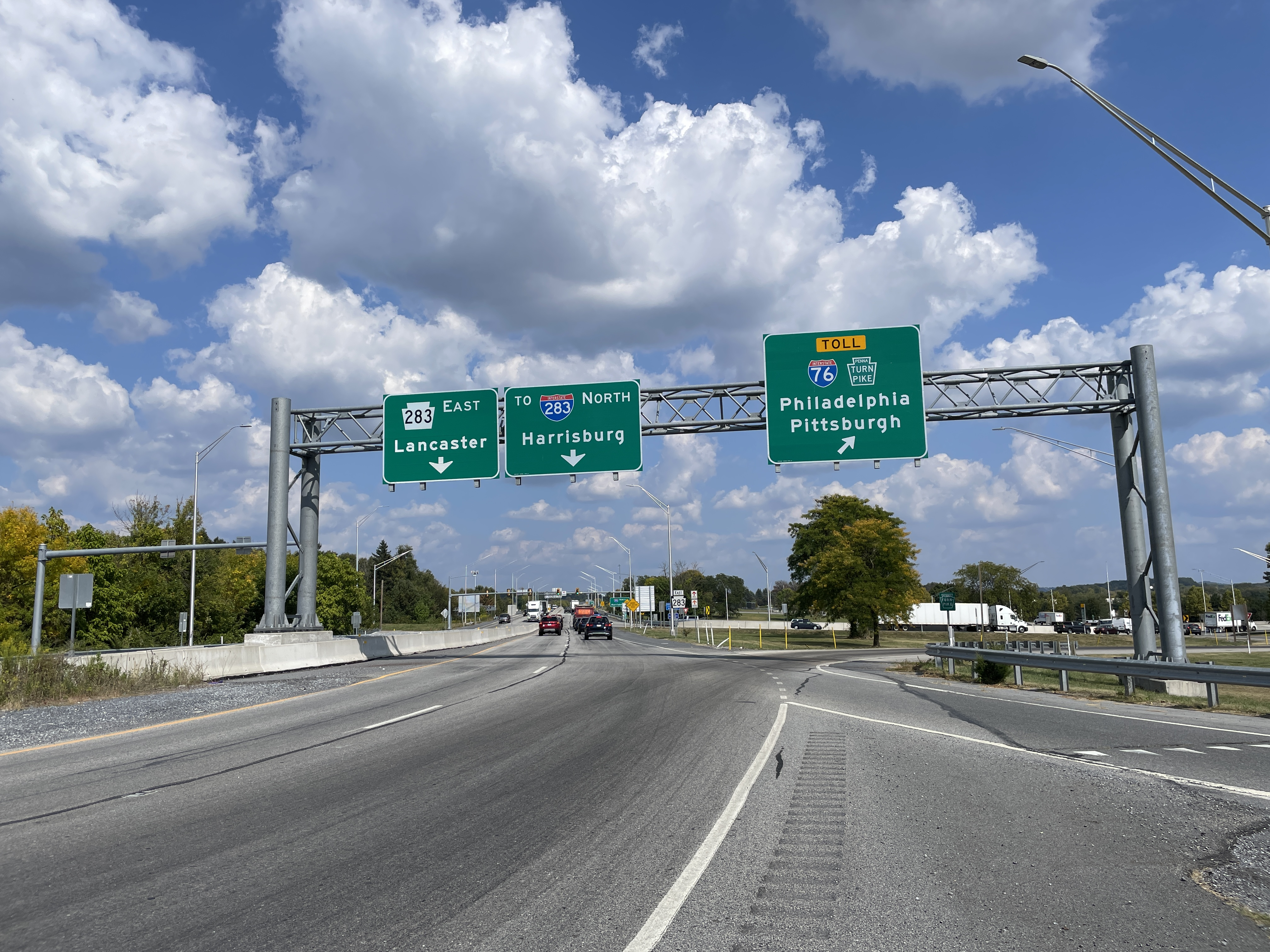
PA 283 eastbound at the I-76 (Pennsylvania Turnpike) and I-283 interchange in Lower Swatara Township

In 1949, the section of what is now PA 283 between the current Mount Joy (PA 230) and Manheim Pike (PA 72) opened to traffic as part of US 230. Construction began in 1951, concluding the following year, to extend the expressway past the current eastern terminus of PA 283 at US 30 to US 222 (Oregon Pike). With the decommissioning of US 230 in 1967, this section became PA 230.

Also in 1967 was the beginning of construction between Elizabethtown and Mount Joy at the end of the then-US 230 expressway. The remaining section between Eisenhower Boulevard and Elizabethtown started construction in 1969, the same year the PA 283 designation was removed from Eisenhower Boulevard. The following year, the short section of road between Eisenhower Boulevard and I-283 opened as a connector between the two roads. With the opening of the section between Elizabethtown and Mount Joy in 1971, the PA 283 designation was revived along this section, extending eastward along the former PA 230 expressway to end at US 30, truncating PA 230 to its current eastern terminus. Finally, the section between I-283 and Elizabethtown opened in 1972, completing the route.

In 1987, when the Pennsylvania General Assembly passed a law reorganizing the Commonwealth's legislative routes into the Location Referencing System (LRS), Interstate 283 gained the LRS designation SR 0283. However, because two distinct traffic routes in the Commonwealth cannot share the same LRS designation, Pennsylvania Route 283 was given the LRS designation SR 0300.

The aging section of the route between Chiques Creek and PA 741 was reconstructed starting in 1994 and concluding in 1995. The section between PA 741 and US 30 was reconstructed as part of a US 30 reconstruction project, concluding in 2000.

In 2010, the Pennsylvania General Assembly designated the entirety of PA 283 as the 283rd Field Artillery Battalion Highway, honoring the soldiers of the United States Army's 283rd Field Artillery Battalion, which served in World War II.

A project took place that reconstructed 6 miles (9.7 km) of PA 283 between Eisenhower Boulevard and PA 341. As part of the project, the ramp from westbound PA 283 to northbound I-283 was re-aligned, and the loop ramp from westbound PA 283 to the Pennsylvania Turnpike was removed and replaced with a left turn and a traffic signal. This eliminated the problem of traffic weaving between the aforementioned loop ramp and the heavily traveled loop ramp from southbound I-283 to eastbound PA 283. The project was projected to be completed in late 2020.

== Exit list ==
All exits are unnumbered.

County	Location	mi	km	Destinations	Notes
Dauphin	Lower Swatara Township	0.000	0.000	South Eisenhower Boulevard to PA 230 – Highspire	Western terminus; at-grade intersection; access via South Eisenhower Boulevard
Dauphin	Lower Swatara Township	0.178	0.286	I-283 to I-76 Toll / Penna Turnpike / I-81 / I-83 – Harrisburg, Philadelphia, Pittsburgh	Exits 1A-B on I-283; I-81/I-83 not signed eastbound
Dauphin	Lower Swatara Township	1.896	3.051	To PA 230 / PA 441 / Airport Road – Harrisburg International Airport	Access via Airport Connector; PA 441 not signed westbound
Dauphin	Lower Swatara Township	2.940	4.731	North Union Street / Fulling Mill Road to PA 441	Franklin D. Linn Interchange; PA 441 not signed eastbound
Dauphin	Londonderry Township	3.927	6.320	Vine Street	Access to Hummelstown
Dauphin	Londonderry Township	6.857	11.035	Toll House Road to PA 230 / PA 341	Western end of PA 341 Truck concurrency eastbound
Lancaster	Mount Joy Township	11.714	18.852	PA 743 (PA 341 Truck east) – Hershey, Elizabethtown	Eastern end of PA 341 Truck concurrency eastbound
Lancaster	Mount Joy Township	15.086	24.279	Rheems, Elizabethtown	Access via Cloverleaf Road
Lancaster	Rapho Township	20.148	32.425	PA 772 – Manheim, Mount Joy	
Lancaster	Rapho Township	21.339	34.342	Esbenshade Road	Eastbound exit and westbound entrance
Lancaster	Rapho Township	21.996	35.399	PA 230 west – Mount Joy	Westbound exit and eastbound entrance; eastern terminus of PA 230
Lancaster	East Hempfield Township	22.654	36.458	Salunga	Access via Spooky Nook Road
Lancaster	East Hempfield Township	25.506	41.048	PA 722 east – Landisville	Western terminus of PA 722
Lancaster	East Hempfield Township	27.171	43.727	PA 741 – East Petersburg, Millersville	
Lancaster	Manheim Township	27.984	45.036	PA 72 (Manheim Pike)	
Lancaster	Lancaster	28.610	46.043	US 30 west – York	Eastbound exit and westbound entrance
Lancaster	Lancaster			Fruitville Pike	Eastbound exit and westbound entrance
Lancaster	Lancaster	29.112	46.851	US 30 east to US 222 / PA 272 (Oregon Pike) / PA 501 north (Lititz Pike) – Philadelphia	Eastern terminus
1.000 mi = 1.609 km; 1.000 km = 0.621 mi: Concurrency terminus; Incomplete access
