= Pennsylvania Route 743 =

State highway in Pennsylvania, US

Pennsylvania Route 743
- PA 743 highlighted in red; partially signed portion north of US 22 backed in blue

Route information
- Maintained by PennDOT
- Length: 24.685 mi (39.727 km)

Major junctions
- South end: PA 441 near Marietta
- PA 230 / PA 241 in Elizabethtown; PA 283 in Mount Joy Township; PA 341 in Conewago Township; US 322 near Hershey; US 422 in Hershey
- North end: US 22 / SR 2025 in Grantville

Location
- Country: United States
- State: Pennsylvania
- Counties: Lancaster, Dauphin

Highway system
- Pennsylvania State Route System; Interstate; US; State; Scenic; Legislative
← PA 742	→ PA 746

Pennsylvania Route 743 (PA 743) is a north–south state route located in central Pennsylvania. The southern terminus is at PA 441 in Marietta. The northern terminus is at U.S. Route 22 (US 22) near the East Hanover Township hamlet of Grantville though some signage has it continue north past Interstate 81 (I-81) to PA 443. The route runs north through Lancaster County, passing through Maytown before reaching Elizabethtown. Here, the route has concurrencies with PA 230 and PA 241 and comes to an interchange with the PA 283 freeway. PA 743 continues into Dauphin County and crosses PA 341 before reaching Hershey. In Hershey, the route follows Cocoa Avenue between US 322 and US 422, the latter which is known as Chocolate Avenue. PA 743 follows Park Avenue north past Hersheypark and Hersheypark Drive east before heading north on Laudermilch Road from Hershey to Grantville.

PA 743 was first designated by 1930 from US 22 (now US 422) east of Hershey north to PA 43 in Grantville along Lingle Avenue and Laudermilch Road. The road between Marietta and Maytown became the southernmost part of PA 241. By 1940, a portion of PA 340 was designated along the road between Marietta and Hershey while PA 743 was realigned to head southwest to US 422 and PA 340 in Hershey. The northern terminus was slightly shortened in the 1940s following a realignment of US 22. PA 743 was moved from Derry Road to Hersheypark Drive in the 1950s. In 1961, PA 743 was extended south from Hershey to Marietta, replacing that section of PA 340. In 2012, PA 743 was realigned at the intersection with US 422 in Hershey, eliminating a short concurrency.

== Route description ==
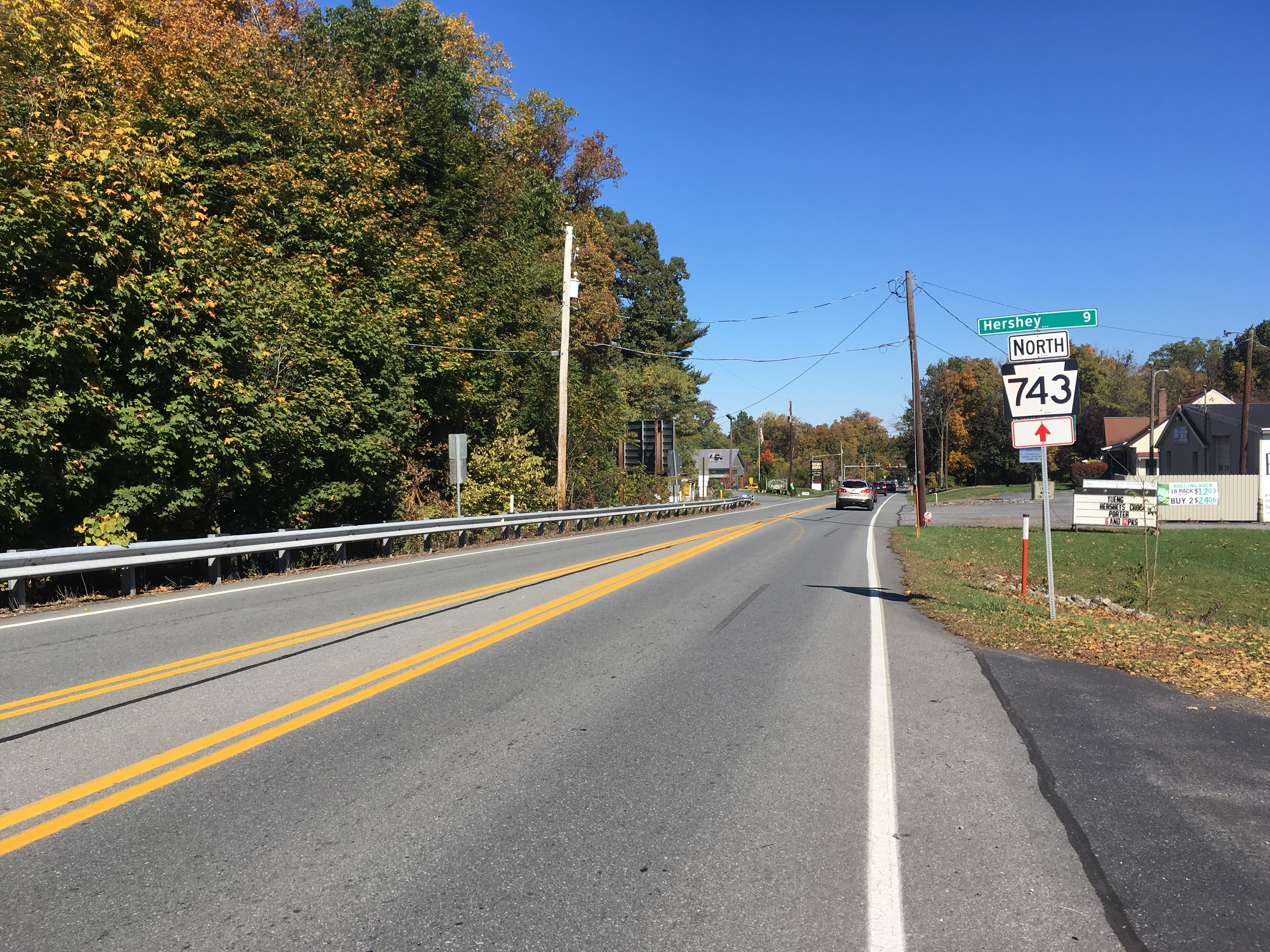
PA 743 northbound past PA 241 in Elizabethtown

PA 743 begins at PA 441 near the borough of Marietta in East Donegal Township, Lancaster County, heading northwest on two-lane undivided Maytown Road. The road passes a mix of farms and residential subdivisions as it comes to the community of Maytown. Here, PA 743 becomes South River Street and is lined with homes. The road comes to the Center Square traffic circle with High Street in the center of Maytown, where the name changes to North River Street. After passing through Maytown, the route becomes Maytown Road again and continues north through open farmland with a few homes, crossing into West Donegal Township. PA 743 makes a turn northeast prior to curving northwest. The road heads northeast and enters the borough of Elizabethtown, coming to a bridge over Amtrak's Keystone Corridor railroad line. A short distance later, PA 743 comes to an intersection with PA 230 and forms a concurrency with that route by turning northwest onto South Market Street. The road, which contains a center left-turn lane, passes several homes prior to entering the downtown area of Elizabethtown, where it becomes two lanes wide, and intersecting PA 241, at which point that route joins PA 230 and PA 743 on North Market Street. The road crosses Conoy Creek before it leaves the downtown and enters residential areas, with PA 241 and PA 743 splitting from PA 230 by briefly heading northeast on Linden Avenue. PA 241 and PA 743 turn north onto North Hanover Street a short distance later, passing a mix of homes and businesses as it crosses into Mount Joy Township and becomes Hershey Road. PA 241 splits from PA 743 by heading northeast onto Mt. Gretna Road, and PA 743 heads north-northeast to a diamond interchange with the PA 283 freeway. Within the area of the interchange, the road is briefly a four-lane divided highway. At this point, the route becomes concurrent with PA 341 Truck in the northbound direction and heads into areas of farms and woods as a two-lane undivided road, crossing the Conewago Recreation Trail.

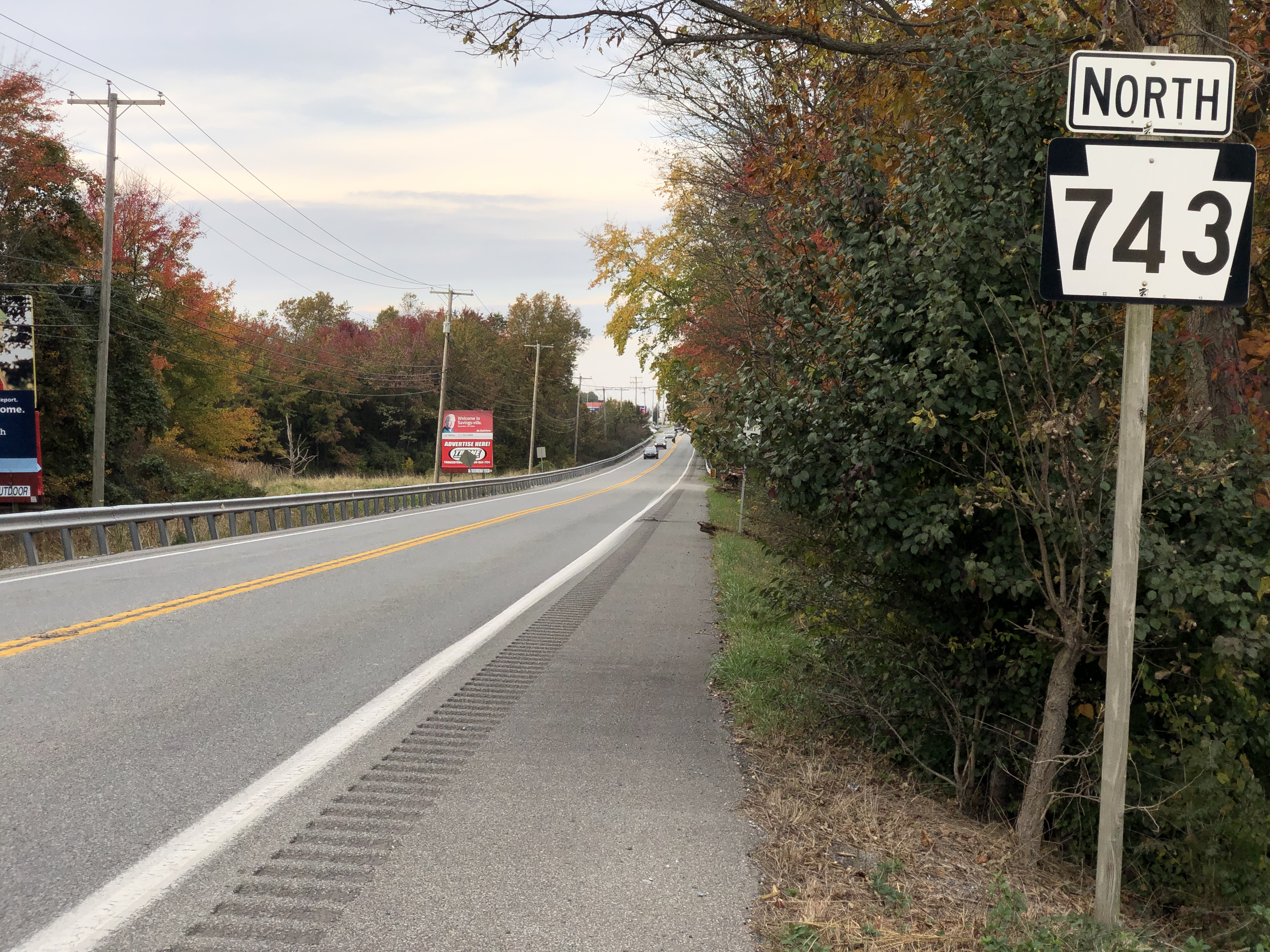
PA 743 northbound in Conewago Township

Upon crossing the Conewago Creek, PA 743 enters Conewago Township in Dauphin County and becomes Elizabethtown Road, continuing north-northwest past farmland, woodland, and a few homes. The road passes under the Pennsylvania Turnpike (I-76) without an interchange before reaching the PA 341 intersection, at which point the PA 341 Truck overlap ends. Past this intersection, PA 743 passes through more rural areas with some homes and businesses, continuing into Derry Township and becoming Fishburn Road. The route turns northwest and passes residential neighborhoods as it enters the community of Hershey. PA 743 turns north onto Cocoa Avenue and passes between businesses to the west and farms to the east as it reaches the US 322 intersection. From this point, Cocoa Avenue continues through residential areas prior to intersecting US 422 (Chocolate Avenue) in the downtown area of Hershey. At this intersection, the name of PA 743 changes to Park Avenue. The road comes to a bridge over Norfolk Southern's Harrisburg Line before it runs between the Hersheypark amusement park to the west and ZooAmerica to the east. The road passes under the Hersheypark monorail, a pedestrian bridge connecting the amusement park and the zoo, and the monorail a second time. Continuing along the eastern edge of Hersheypark, the road runs near some homes to the east before reaching Hersheypark Drive.

At this point, PA 743 turns east onto Hersheypark Drive, which is a four-lane road. The route passes between office buildings and the Pennsylvania State Police Academy to the north and the Tanger Outlets Hershey outlet mall to the south before heading northeast to Laudermilch Road. Here, PA 743 turns north onto two-lane Laudermilch Road and enters agricultural areas. The road curves north and crosses the Swatara Creek into East Hanover Township. Here, the route winds north through a mix of farms, woods, and homes. The road passes a few businesses at the US 22 intersection in Grantville. The PA 743 designation officially ends at the US 22 intersection according to the Pennsylvania Department of Transportation but some signage and mapping websites show it continuing north on Laudermilch Road and Bow Creek Road.

Laudermilch Road runs north from this intersection as state-maintained SR 2025 for 0.3 miles (0.48 km) before intersecting Jonestown Road. At this intersection, the road becomes township-maintained Bow Creek Road and continues northwest to I-81's exit 80. After this interchange, the route turns north into rural areas and passes a short distance to the west of Hollywood Casino at Penn National Race Course. Bow Creek Road comes to its northern terminus at an intersection with PA 443 at the base of Blue Mountain.

== History ==
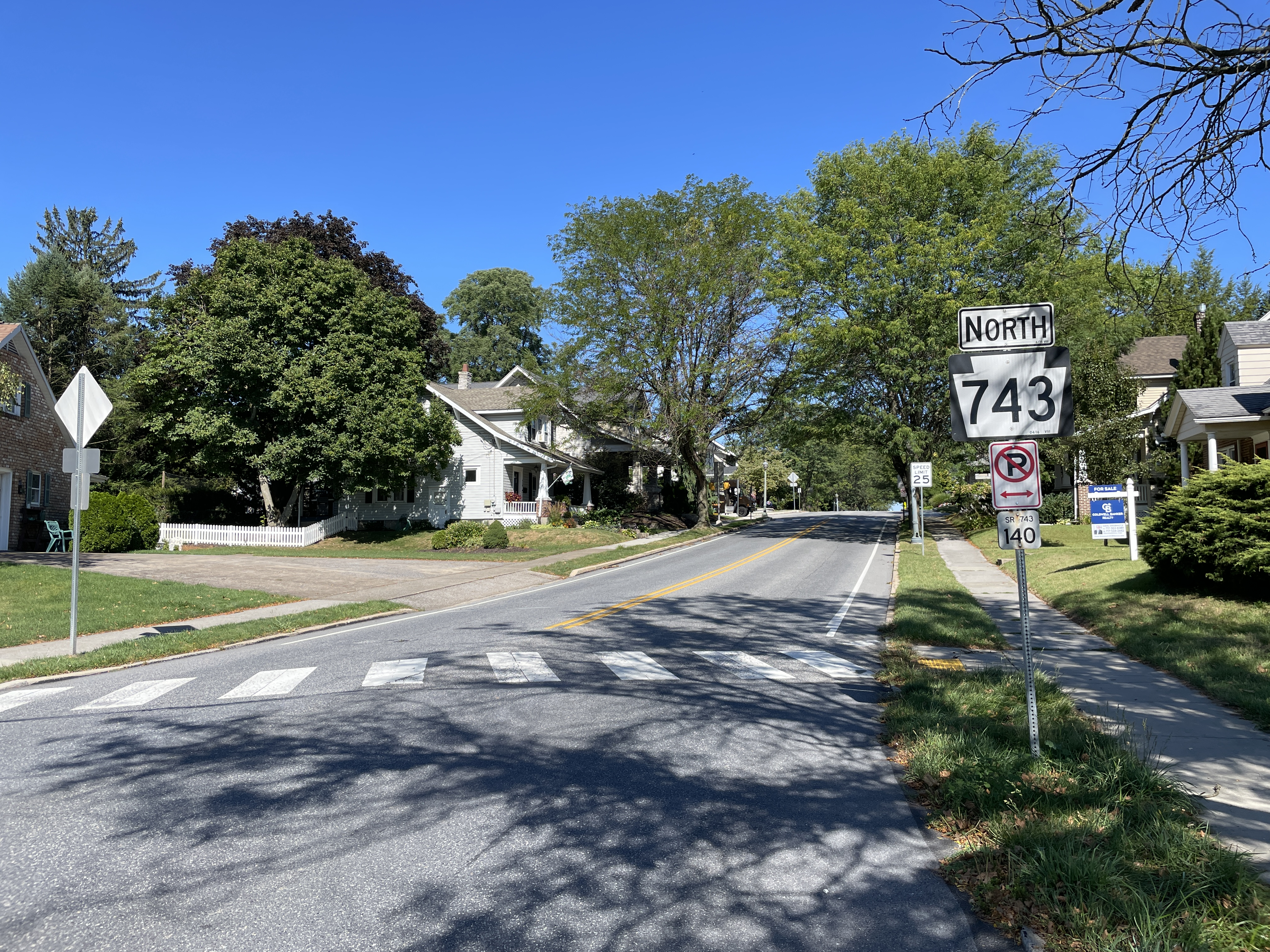
PA 743 northbound in Hershey

When legislative routes were first established in Pennsylvania in 1911, present-day PA 743 was not given a route number. The road between Elizabethtown and Hershey was paved by 1926. PA 743 was designated by 1930 to run from US 22 (now US 422) east of Hershey north to PA 43 (Jonestown Road) in Grantville, following Lingle Avenue and Laudermilch Road. At this time, the entire route was paved. In addition, the road between Marietta and Maytown was designated as the southernmost part of PA 241. The road between Marietta and Hershey via Elizabethtown was designated as a westward extension of PA 340 by 1940, which replaced the PA 241 designation between Marietta and Maytown. Also, PA 743 was realigned to follow Laudermilch Road, Derry Road, and Park Avenue to end at US 422 and PA 340 at Chocolate Avenue in Hershey.

In the 1940s, the northern terminus of PA 743 was cut back to its current location follow a realignment of US 22 from Jonestown Road to Allentown Boulevard. The route was realigned to use Hersheypark Drive between Park Avenue and Laudermilch Road in the 1950s. In 1961, PA 743 was extended south from Hershey to its current southern terminus at PA 441 in Marietta, replacing that portion of PA 340. In 2010, a $12 million project began to realign PA 743 at its intersection with US 422 in Hershey, eliminating a short concurrency. The project realigned the route along Cocoa Avenue to the west to intersect US 422 at Park Avenue and also built a new bridge carrying PA 743 over the Norfolk Southern railroad tracks. The intersection realignment was completed in 2012 while the new bridge was completed in 2013.

== Major intersections ==
County	Location	mi	km	Destinations	Notes
Lancaster	East Donegal Township	0.000	0.000	PA 441 (River Road) – Columbia, Middletown	Southern terminus
Lancaster	Elizabethtown	6.533	10.514	PA 230 east (South Market Street) – Mt. Joy	Southern end of PA 230 concurrency
Lancaster	Elizabethtown	7.349	11.827	PA 241 south (West High Street)	Southern end of PA 241 concurrency
Lancaster	Elizabethtown	7.815	12.577	PA 230 west (North Market Street) – Middletown	Northern end of PA 230 concurrency
Lancaster	Mount Joy Township	8.452	13.602	PA 241 north (Mt. Gretna Road) – Colebrook, Mount Gretna, Lebanon	Northern end of PA 241 concurrency
Lancaster	Mount Joy Township	9.416– 9.435	15.154– 15.184	PA 283 – Harrisburg, Lancaster	Southern end of PA 341 Truck concurrency northbound; interchange
Dauphin	Conewago Township	12.015	19.336	PA 341 (Colebrook Road) – Deodate, Colebrook PA 341 Truck ends	Northern terminus of PA 341 Truck
Dauphin	Derry Township	16.833	27.090	US 322 (Governor Road) – Hersheypark Drive, Harrisburg, Campbelltown	
Dauphin	Derry Township	17.657	28.416	US 422 (Chocolate Avenue) – Lebanon	
Dauphin	East Hanover Township	24.685	39.727	US 22 (Allentown Boulevard) to I-81	Northern terminus; access to I-81 via SR 2025
1.000 mi = 1.609 km; 1.000 km = 0.621 mi: Concurrency terminus

== PA 743 Truck ==
Pennsylvania Route 743 Truck
- Location: Hershey, Pennsylvania
- Length: 0.6 mi (970 m)

Pennsylvania Route 743 Truck is a truck route of PA 743 bypassing a narrow intersection with US 322 in Hershey, Pennsylvania. The route follows Fishburn Avenue connecting US 322 with southbound PA 743, allowing trucks to avoid downtown Hershey.
