= Bow Creek (Swatara Creek tributary) =

River in Pennsylvania, United States

Coordinates: 40°19′27″N 76°39′00″W

Bow Creek is a 7.8-mile-long (12.6 km) tributary of Swatara Creek in Dauphin County, Pennsylvania, in the United States.

It originates as run off from various springs north of Interstate 81, near the village of Grantville and remains in East Hanover township, Dauphin County for its entirety. It spills into the Swatara Creek at a point midway between Sandbeach Road and Route 743. During the 1800s, it was crossed via an aqueduct by the Union Canal.

== See also ==
- List of rivers of Pennsylvania
