= Mulberry Street Bridge =

Bridge in Harrisburg, Pennsylvania, U.S.

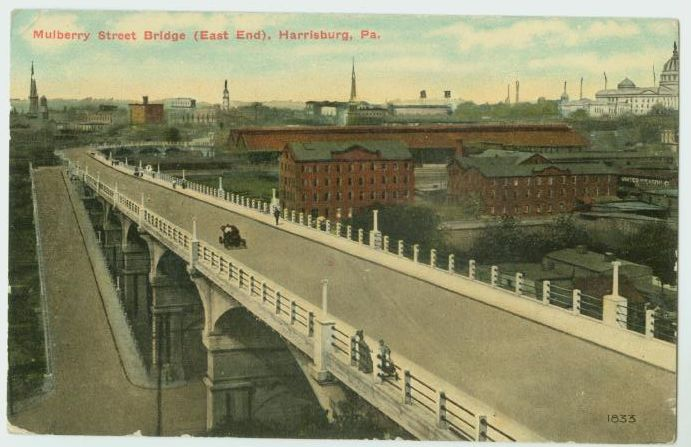
- Postcard of the Mulberry Street Bridge as seen from Allison Hill in 1913
- Coordinates: 40.2612°N 76.8750°W
- Carries: Motor vehicles and pedestrians
- Crosses: Cameron Street, Paxton Creek
- Locale: Harrisburg, Pennsylvania

Characteristics
- Total length: 584 feet (178 m)
- Width: 30.4 feet (9.3 m)

History
- Opened: 1907-09 rehabilitated 1957

The Mulberry Street Bridge is an American concrete arch bridge that spans Cameron Street and Paxton Creek in Harrisburg, Pennsylvania.

== History and architectural features ==
This bridge is the second to be constructed at the current site to connect the Allison Hill neighborhood of East Harrisburg to Downtown. It replaced an iron and fire-prone, wood-decked structure erected in 1891, which was heralded as a unifier of a "Greater Harrisburg." The concrete replacement bridge that was built in 1909 was a marvel at the time, and is eligible to be listed on the National Register of Historic Places.

== See also ==
- List of bridges documented by the Historic American Engineering Record in Pennsylvania
