= Chocolate Avenue =

Street in Hershey Pennsylvania

- U.S. Route 422
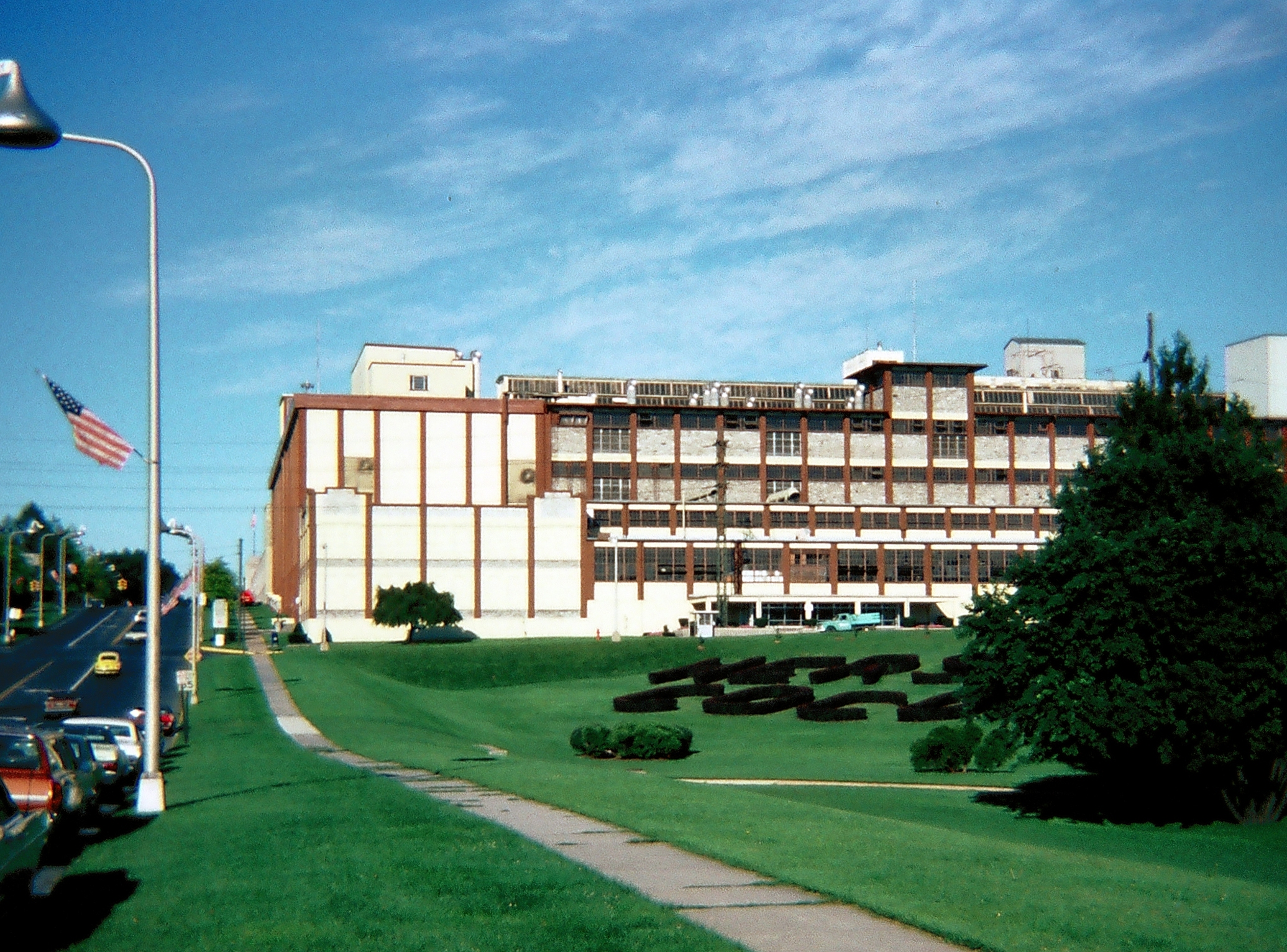
- Looking southwest down Chocolate Avenue, 1976.
- East end: Pennsylvania Route 3017
- West end: Hersheypark Drive
- North: Hersheypark Drive
- South: East Governor Road

Chocolate Avenue is a street in Hershey, Pennsylvania, that runs past the site of the original Hershey's Chocolate Factory, and is considered to be the main street of the town. It runs northeasterly from Hersheypark Drive to the intersection of Pennsylvania Route 3017 (Lingle Avenue), at which point the road crosses into Lebanon County and continues as Main Street in Palmyra Borough. Most of Chocolate Avenue is a segment of U.S. Route 422.

== Attractions on Chocolate Avenue ==
Today, Chocolate Avenue is a big tourist attraction for those visiting Pennsylvania. ChocolateTown Park (48 W. Chocolate Ave.) is located across the street from The Hershey Story and is the site for several Downtown Hershey Association festivals and street fairs. This peaceful little green space offers visitors and locals a chance to rest on a park bench and enjoy the hustle and bustle of Chocolate Avenue.

The Hershey Theatre, known as ‘The Most Impressive Theatre in Pennsylvania’ was built in the early twentieth century as part of Milton S. Hershey’s Great Building Campaign and provided job opportunities for hundreds of workers during the Great Depression.

== History ==
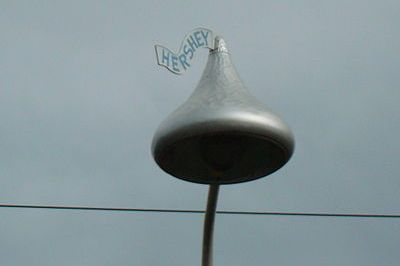
A wrapped Hershey's Kiss lamp post on Chocolate Avenue.

Chocolate Avenue was one of the first two streets built in the town of Hershey by Milton Hershey when he built up the town for his chocolate empire; the other was Cocoa Avenue, which intersects Chocolate Avenue to form the town square.

The name of the street was selected by Milton Hershey himself. He picked names for many streets in the town that related to chocolate.

Chocolate Avenue is known for its street lamps that are shaped like Hershey's Kisses. These unique lamps were designed by engineers with the Line Material Company and manufactured using a process called aluminum metal spinning in 1963. Some of the kisses are shown as being wrapped, and some as unwrapped, alternating between these two designs. These lamps can also be found on Park Avenue. In 1990, the need to replace the wrappers for the lamps became noticeable.

The street has been known for traffic congestion during the summer months due to tourists visiting Hersheypark and other local attractions.
