= Pennsylvania Route 341 =

State highway in Pennsylvania, US

Pennsylvania Route 341
- Colebrook Road
- PA 341 in red and PA 341 Truck in blue

Route information
- Maintained by PennDOT
- Length: 10.694 mi (17.210 km)

Major junctions
- West end: PA 230 / PA 341 Truck in Londonderry Township
- PA 743 in Conewago Township
- East end: PA 241 in South Londonderry Township

Location
- Country: United States
- State: Pennsylvania
- Counties: Dauphin, Lebanon

Highway system
- Pennsylvania State Route System; Interstate; US; State; Scenic; Legislative
← PA 340	→ PA 342

Pennsylvania Route 341 (PA 341) is a state highway in the U.S. state of Pennsylvania. The route runs 10.7 miles (17.2 km) from PA 230 in Londonderry Township in Dauphin County east to PA 241 in South Londonderry Township in Lebanon County. The route is a two-lane undivided road known as Colebrook Road for its entire length, passing through rural areas. Along the way, PA 341 crosses PA 743 near Deodate and passes through Upper Lawn. An eastbound truck route, PA 341 Truck, bypasses the route between PA 230 and PA 743. PA 341 was first designated onto its current alignment by 1930, running between U.S. Route 230 (US 230, now PA 230) and PA 241. The route was fully paved in the 1930s. Between the 1930s and 1940s, PA 341 headed southeast along Lawn Road to end at PA 241 in Lawn.

== Route description ==
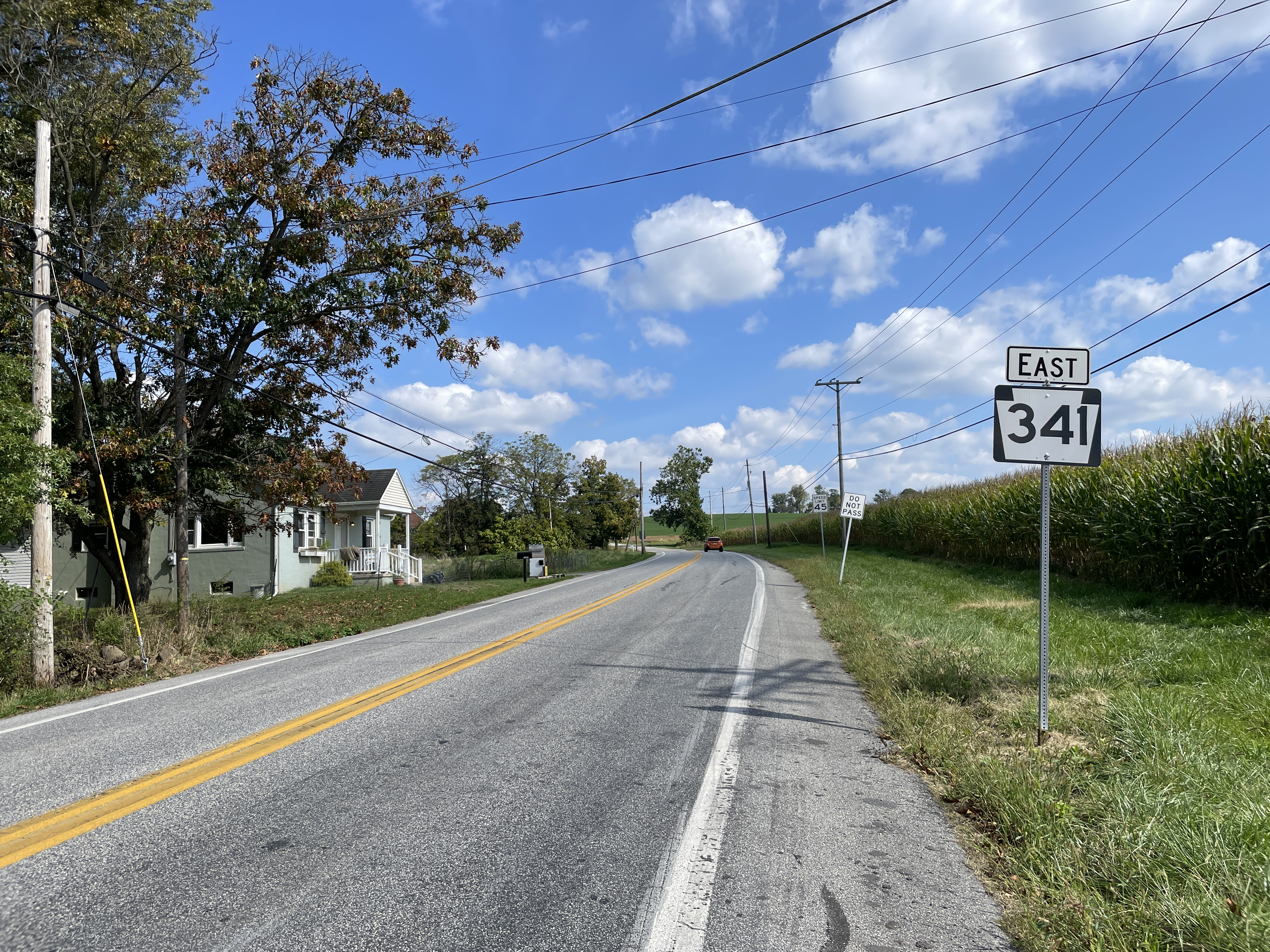
PA 341 eastbound in Londonderry Township

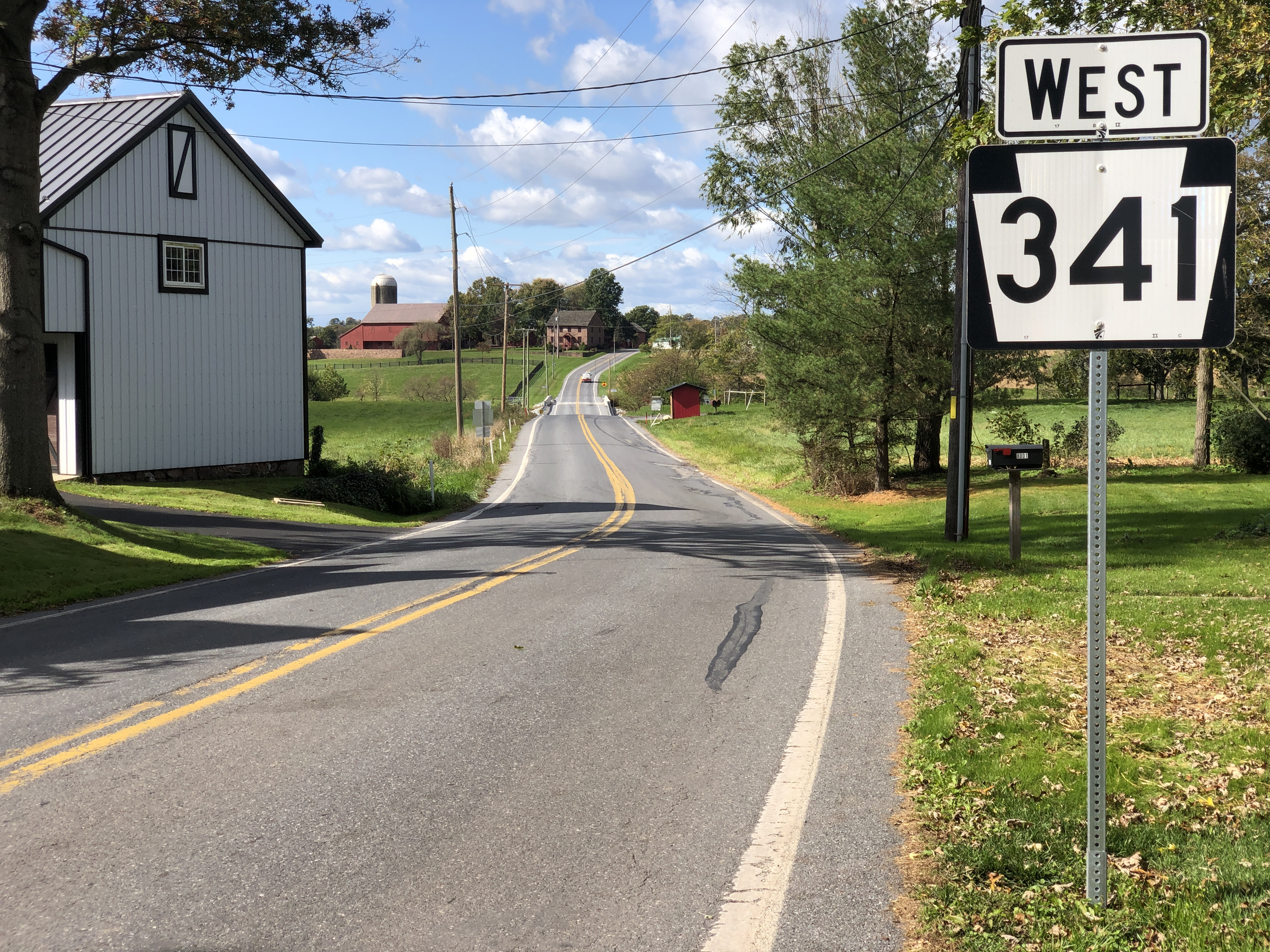
PA 341 westbound in South Londonderry Township

PA 341 begins at an intersection with PA 230 in Londonderry Township, Dauphin County, where PA 341 Truck heads east along PA 230. From this intersection, the route heads northeast along two-lane undivided Colebrook Road, running through rural residential areas before it comes to a bridge under the PA 283 freeway. The road curves east and passes through wooded land with a few homes. PA 341 intersects Toll House Road, which heads south to an interchange with PA 283, and runs east-northeast into agricultural areas with some trees and homes. The route comes to a bridge over the Pennsylvania Turnpike (Interstate 76) and continues through rural land as it enters Conewago Township. The road turns east and runs through a mix of farmland and woodland with a few homes. PA 341 passes through the community of Deodate before it intersects PA 743, at which point PA 341 Truck returns to the route. The route heads northeast into farmland with some trees and residences past this intersection.

PA 341 enters South Londonderry Township in Lebanon County, continuing east through rural areas with some homes. In the community of Upper Lawn, the route turns northeast to remain along Colebrook Road and runs through agricultural land with some woods. PA 341 turns southeast and comes to its eastern terminus at an intersection with PA 241.

== History ==
When Pennsylvania first legislated routes in 1911, what is now PA 341 was not given a legislative number. PA 341 was designated by 1930 to run from US 230 (now PA 230) east of Middletown east to PA 241 near Colebrook along its current alignment. At this time, the route was paved for a short distance east of US 230 and in the Deodate area while remainder was unpaved. The entire length of the route was paved in the 1930s. Also, the route was realigned to head southeast along Lawn Road to end at PA 241 in Lawn. PA 341 was realigned back to its current eastern terminus in the 1940s.

== Major intersections ==
County	Location	mi	km	Destinations	Notes
Dauphin	Londonderry Township	0.000	0.000	PA 230 / PA 341 Truck east (Harrisburg Pike) – Lancaster, Middletown, Harrisburg	Western terminus
Dauphin	Conewago Township	5.088	8.188	PA 743 / PA 341 Truck ends (Elizabethtown Road) – Hershey, Elizabethtown	
Lebanon	South Londonderry Township	10.694	17.210	PA 241 (Elizabethtown Road) – Mt. Gretna, Lebanon, Elizabethtown	Eastern terminus
1.000 mi = 1.609 km; 1.000 km = 0.621 mi

== PA 341 Truck ==
Pennsylvania Route 341 Truck
- Location: Londonderry Township-Conewago Township

Pennsylvania Route 341 Truck is an eastbound truck route of PA 341 between PA 230 in Londonderry Township and PA 743 in Conewago Township, where trucks with three or more axles are prohibited. The truck route heads east from the western terminus of PA 341 on PA 230 for a short distance. PA 341 Truck turns north onto Toll House Road and reaches an interchange with the PA 283 freeway. From here, the route follows PA 283 east through Conewago Township to the next exit with PA 743 in Mount Joy Township, Lancaster County. The truck route heads north on PA 743, entering Conewago Township in Dauphin County, before returning to PA 341 near the village of Deodate.
