= Upper Lawn, Pennsylvania =

Unincorporated community in Pennsylvania, US

- Unincorporated community
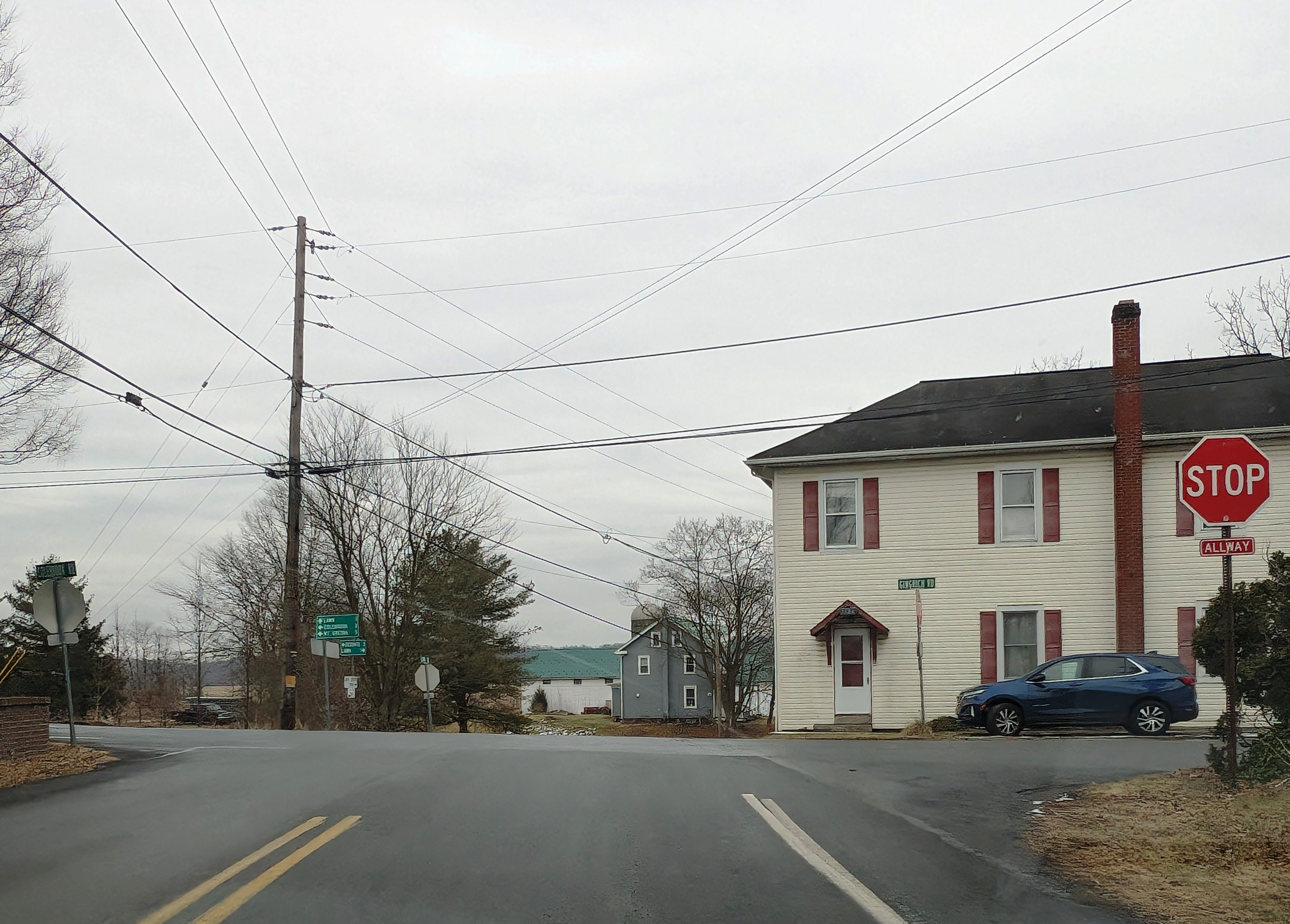
- Center of Upper Lawn

- Location within Pennsylvania
- Coordinates: 40°13′42″N 76°33′5″W
- Country: United States
- State: Pennsylvania
- County: Lebanon
- Township: South Londonderry
- Elevation: 479 ft (146 m)
- Time zone: UTC-5 (Eastern (EST))
  - Summer (DST): UTC-4 (EDT)
- Area code: 717
- GNIS feature ID: 1190237

Upper Lawn is an unincorporated community in South Londonderry Township in Lebanon County, Pennsylvania, United States. Upper Lawn is located at the intersection of Pennsylvania Route 341, Lawn Road, and Gingrich Road.
