= Deodate, Pennsylvania =

Unincorporated community in Pennsylvania, US

Coordinates: 40.213°N 76.621°W

Deodate is an unincorporated community in Dauphin County, Pennsylvania, United States, and is part of the Harrisburg-Carlisle Metropolitan Statistical Area.

Deodate is located on east-to-west Route 341 in Conewago Township and the area code is 717. Route 743 runs north-to-south, forms the eastern boundary, and intersects 341 in Deodate.
