= Salunga, Pennsylvania =

Unincorporated community in Pennsylvania, US

- Census-designated place
- Location within Pennsylvania Location within the United States
- Coordinates: 40°05′58″N 76°25′34″W
- Country: United States
- State: Pennsylvania
- County: Lancaster
- Townships: West Hempfield, East Hempfield

Area
  - Total: 1.80 sq mi (4.66 km^{2})
  - Land: 1.80 sq mi (4.66 km^{2})
  - Water: 0 sq mi (0.0 km^{2})
- Elevation: 411 ft (125 m)

Population (2010)
  - Total: 2,695
  - Density: 1,498/sq mi (578.4/km^{2})
- Time zone: UTC−5 (Eastern (EST))
  - Summer (DST): UTC−4 (EDT)
- ZIP Code: 17538 (Landisville)
- FIPS code: 42-67656
- GNIS feature ID: 1186888

Salunga is an unincorporated community and census-designated place (CDP) in West Hempfield and East Hempfield townships in Lancaster County, Pennsylvania, United States. As of the 2010 census, the population was 2,695. The community was once part of the Salunga-Landisville CDP, before splitting into two separate CDPs for the 2010 census, the other being Landisville.

The name "Salunga" comes from the nearby Chiquesalunga (now Chickies) Creek, which in turn is derived from the Lenape "Chiquesalunga", meaning "place of the crayfish".

== Geography ==
Salunga is in northwestern Lancaster County, in the northeastern part of West Hempfield Township and the western part of East Hempfield Township. It is bordered to the east by Landisville. Pennsylvania Route 283, a four-lane freeway, forms the northeastern edge of the CDP, with access from an interchange with Spooky Nook Road. PA 283 leads southeast 8 miles (13 km) to Lancaster, the county seat, and northwest 30 miles (48 km) to Harrisburg, the state capital.

According to the U.S. Census Bureau, the Salunga CDP has a total area of 1.8 square miles (4.7 km^{2}), of which 0.3 acres (1,352 m^{2}), or 0.03%, are water. Chiques Creek flows past the northwestern side of the community, running southwest to the Susquehanna River.
