= Conoy Creek =

Stream in Pennsylvania, United States

Coordinates: 40°04′44″N 76°39′41″W

Conoy Creek is an 11.2-mile-long (18.0 km) tributary of the Susquehanna River in Lancaster County, Pennsylvania, in the United States.

The headwaters of the creek pass through the borough of Elizabethtown, heading southwest. Conoy Creek joins the Susquehanna River at Bainbridge.

== See also ==
- List of rivers of Pennsylvania
