= List of places in Pennsylvania: O =

This list of cities, towns, unincorporated communities, counties, and other recognized places in the U.S. state of Pennsylvania also includes information on the number and names of counties in which the place lies, and its lower and upper zip code bounds, if applicable.

Name of place	Number of counties	Principal county	Lower zip code	Upper zip code
Oak Forest	1	Greene County	15370	
Oak Grove	1	Adams County		
Oak Grove	1	Clearfield County	16858	
Oak Grove	1	Monroe County		
Oak Grove	1	Montour County		
Oak Grove	1	Schuylkill County	17963	
Oak Grove	1	Washington County		
Oak Grove	1	Westmoreland County	15658	
Oak Hall	1	Centre County	16827	
Oak Hill	1	Allegheny County	15137	15145
Oak Hill	1	Clearfield County	16845	
Oak Hill	1	Lackawanna County	18507	
Oak Hill	1	Lancaster County		
Oak Hill	1	Venango County		
Oak Hills	1	Butler County		
Oak Lane	1	Montgomery County	19012	
Oak Lane	1	Philadelphia County	19126	
Oak Park	1	Montgomery County	19446	
Oak Park	1	Northumberland County	17857	
Oak Ridge	2	Armstrong County	16245	
Oak Ridge	1	Clearfield County		
Oak Shade	1	Lancaster County	17566	
Oak Tree	1	Indiana County		
Oakbottom	1	Lancaster County	17566	
Oakbourne	1	Chester County		
Oakbrook	1	Berks County		
Oakdale	1	Allegheny County	15071	
Oakdale	1	Luzerne County	18224	
Oakford	1	Bucks County	19053	
Oakhurst	1	Cambria County		
Oakland	1	Allegheny County	15213	
Oakland	1	Armstrong County		
Oakland	1	Cambria County		
Oakland	1	Lawrence County	16101	
Oakland	1	Mercer County		
Oakland	1	Susquehanna County	18847	
Oakland Beach	1	Crawford County	16316	
Oakland Mills	1	Juniata County	17076	
Oakland Township	1	Butler County		
Oakland Township	1	Susquehanna County		
Oakland Township	1	Venango County		
Oaklane Manor	1	Montgomery County	19012	
Oakleigh	1	Dauphin County	17111	
Oakley	1	Susquehanna County		
Oaklyn	1	Northumberland County	17801	
Oakmont	1	Allegheny County	15139	
Oakmont	1	Cambria County	15904	
Oakmont	1	Delaware County	15139	
Oakryn	1	Lancaster County	17563	
Oaks	1	Montgomery County	19456	
Oaktree Hollow	1	Bucks County		
Oakvale Boulevard	1	Butler County	16002	
Oakville	1	Cumberland County	17257	
Oakville	1	Westmoreland County	15650	
Oakwood	1	Lawrence County		
Obelisk	1	Montgomery County	19492	
Oberlin	1	Dauphin County	17113	
Oberlin Gardens	1	Dauphin County	17113	
Obold	1	Berks County		
Ochre Mill	1	Luzerne County		
Odell	1	Washington County		
Odenthal	1	Cambria County	15946	
Odenwelder	1	Northampton County	18042	
Odin	1	Potter County	16915	
O'Donnell	1	Jefferson County		
Ogden	1	Delaware County	19061	
Ogden Park	1	Delaware County	19062	
Ogdensburg	1	Tioga County	17765	
Ogdonia	1	Sullivan County		
Ogle	1	Butler County	16046	
Ogle Township	1	Somerset County		
Ogletown	1	Somerset County	15963	
Ogontz	1	Montgomery County	19117	
O'Hara Township	1	Allegheny County		
Ohio Township	1	Allegheny County		
Ohio Township	1	Beaver County		
Ohiopyle	1	Fayette County	15470	
Ohioview	1	Beaver County	15052	
Ohioville	1	Beaver County	15059	
Ohl	1	Jefferson County	15864	
Oil City	1	Cambria County	15925	
Oil City	1	Venango County	16301	
Oil Creek	1	Venango County	16301	
Oil Creek Township	1	Crawford County		
Oilcreek Township	1	Venango County		
Oklahoma	1	Clearfield County	15801	
Oklahoma	1	Westmoreland County	15613	
Okome	1	Lycoming County	17739	
Olanta	1	Clearfield County	16863	
Old Boston	1	Luzerne County	18641	
Old Clarendon	1	Warren County	16313	
Old Concord	1	Washington County	15329	
Old Crabtree	1	Westmoreland County	15650	
Old Cranberry	1	Luzerne County		
Old Enon	1	Lawrence County	16120	
Old Forge	1	Delaware County	19060	
Old Forge	1	Franklin County		
Old Forge	1	Lackawanna County	18518	
Old Fort	1	Centre County		
Old Frame	1	Fayette County	15478	
Old Furnace	1	Beaver County		
Old Junction	1	Somerset County	15501	
Old Line	1	Lancaster County	17545	
Old Lycoming Township	1	Lycoming County		
Old Meadow	1	Westmoreland County	15683	
Old Mountain House	1	Fulton County		
Old Orchard	1	Northampton County	18042	
Old Port	1	Juniata County	17082	
Old Shade Furnace	1	Somerset County		
Old Side	1	Centre County		
Old Stanton	1	Westmoreland County	15672	
Old Zionsville	1	Lehigh County	18068	
Old Zollarsville	1	Washington County		
Oleona	1	Potter County		
Oleopolis	1	Venango County	16301	
Oley	1	Berks County	19547	
Oley Furnace	1	Berks County	19522	19547
Oley Line	1	Berks County	19547	
Oley Township	1	Berks County		
Oliphant Furnace	1	Fayette County	15401	
Oliveburg	1	Jefferson County	15764	
Oliver	1	Fayette County	15472	
Oliver Mills	1	Luzerne County		
Oliver Township	1	Jefferson County		
Oliver Township	1	Mifflin County		
Oliver Township	1	Perry County		
Olivers Mills	1	Luzerne County	18702	
Olivet	1	Armstrong County	15618	
Olmsted	1	Potter County		
Olmsville	1	Tioga County		
Olney	1	Philadelphia County	19120	
Olyphant	1	Lackawanna County	18447	
Onberg	1	Indiana County	15701	
Oneida	1	Butler County	16001	
Oneida	1	Schuylkill County	18242	
Oneida Junction	1	Luzerne County	18201	
Oneida Township	1	Huntingdon County		
Oniontown	1	Mercer County		
Onnalinda	1	Cambria County	15921	
Ono	1	Lebanon County	17077	
Onspaugh Corners	1	Crawford County		
Ontario	1	Washington County	15324	
Ontelaunee	1	Berks County	19605	
Ontelaunee Township	1	Berks County		
Opp	1	Lycoming County	17756	
Oppenheimer	1	Bedford County		
Oppermans Corner	1	Chester County	19425	
Option	1	Allegheny County	15236	
Orange	1	Luzerne County	18612	
Orange Township	1	Columbia County		
Orangeville	1	Columbia County	17859	
Orbisonia	1	Huntingdon County	17243	
Orchard Beach	1	Erie County	16428	
Orchard Crest	1	Cumberland County		
Orchard Crossing	1	Blair County	16686	
Orchard Hill	1	Westmoreland County	15666	
Orchard Hills	1	Armstrong County	15613	
Orchard Hills	1	Delaware County	19063	
Orchard Park	1	Lancaster County	17601	
Ore Hill	1	Blair County	16673	
Ore Valley	1	York County	17403	
Orefield	1	Lehigh County	18069	
Oregon	1	Lancaster County	17540	
Oregon Hill	1	Lycoming County	16938	
Oregon Township	1	Wayne County		
Oreland	1	Montgomery County	19075	
Oreminea	1	Blair County	16693	
Oreville	1	Berks County	19539	
Orient	1	Fayette County	15420	
Oriental	1	Juniata County	17045	
Oriole	1	Lycoming County	17740	
Ormrod	1	Lehigh County	18037	
Ormsby	1	McKean County	16726	
Orners Corner	1	Blair County	16601	
Orrstown	1	Franklin County	17244	
Orrtanna	1	Adams County	17353	
Orrton	1	Berks County		
Orrville	1	Allegheny County	15144	
Orson	1	Wayne County	18449	
Orvilla	1	Montgomery County	19440	
Orville	1	Allegheny County	15144	
Orviston	1	Centre County	16864	
Orwell	1	Bradford County	18837	
Orwell Township	1	Bradford County		
Orwig	1	York County		
Orwigsburg	1	Schuylkill County	17961	
Orwin	1	Schuylkill County	17980	
Osborn	1	Mercer County		
Osborne	1	Allegheny County	15143	
Oscar	1	Armstrong County		
Osceola	1	Clearfield County		
Osceola	1	Tioga County	16942	
Osceola Mills	1	Clearfield County	16666	
Osceola Township	1	Tioga County		
Osgood	1	Mercer County	16125	
Oshanter	1	Clearfield County	16830	
Ostend	1	Clearfield County	15757	
Osterburg	1	Bedford County	16667	
Osterhout	1	Wyoming County	18657	
Oswayo	1	Potter County	16915	
Oswayo Township	1	Potter County		
Ott Town	1	Bedford County	15537	
Ottawa	1	Montour County	17821	
Otter Creek Township	1	Mercer County		
Otterbein	1	Franklin County		
Otto	1	Northumberland County		
Otto Township	1	McKean County		
Ottown	1	Bedford County	15537	
Ottsville	1	Bucks County	18942	
Outcrop	1	Fayette County	15478	
Outlet	1	Luzerne County	18612	
Outwood	1	Schuylkill County	17963	
Oval	1	Lycoming County	17759	
Overbrook	1	Allegheny County		
Overbrook	1	Philadelphia County	19151	
Overbrook Hills	1	Montgomery County	19151	
Overfield Township	1	Wyoming County		
Overholt Acres	1	Westmoreland County	15642	
Overleigh	1	Montgomery County	19004	
Overlook	1	Lancaster County	17601	
Overlook	1	Northumberland County		
Overlook Heights	1	Centre County		
Overlook Springs	1	Lehigh County		
Overshot	1	Bradford County		
Overton	1	Bradford County	18833	
Overton Township	1	Bradford County		
Overview	1	Cumberland County	17053	
Owassee	1	Tioga County		
Owens Corners	1	Erie County		
Owensdale	1	Fayette County	15425	
Owl Hollow	1	Bradford County		
Owls Nest	1	Elk County		
Owltown	1	Venango County		
Oxford	1	Chester County	19363	
Oxford Township	1	Adams County		
Oxford Valley	1	Bucks County		
Oyster Point	1	Lancaster County	17601	
