= Duke Maronic =

American football player (1921–1996)

No. 61, 67
- Position: Guard

Personal information
- Born: July 13, 1921; Steelton, Pennsylvania, U.S.
- Died: July 1, 1996 (aged 74); Harrisburg, Pennsylvania, U.S.
- Listed height: 5 ft 9 in (1.75 m)
- Listed weight: 209 lb (95 kg)

Career information
- High school: Steelton
- NFL draft: 1944: undrafted

Career history

Playing
- Philadelphia Eagles (1944–1950); New York Giants (1951)

Coaching
- Harrisburg Capitols (1965) Assistant coach; Harrisburg Capitols (1966-1967) Head coach

Awards and highlights
- 2× NFL champion (1948, 1949)

Career NFL statistics
- Games played: 77
- Games started: 29
- Fumble recoveries: 5
- Stats at Pro Football Reference

Dusan J. "Duke" Maronic (July 13, 1921 – July 1, 1996) was an American professional football offensive lineman who played eight seasons in the National Football League (NFL), mainly for the Philadelphia Eagles. He didn't play college football. In 1965, Maronic was also an assistant coach in the Atlantic Coast Football League with the Harrisburg Capitols, and then took over the head coaching job in 1966 through 1967.
