= Conrad and Margaret Allerman House =

Historic house in Pennsylvania, United States

- U.S. National Register of Historic Places
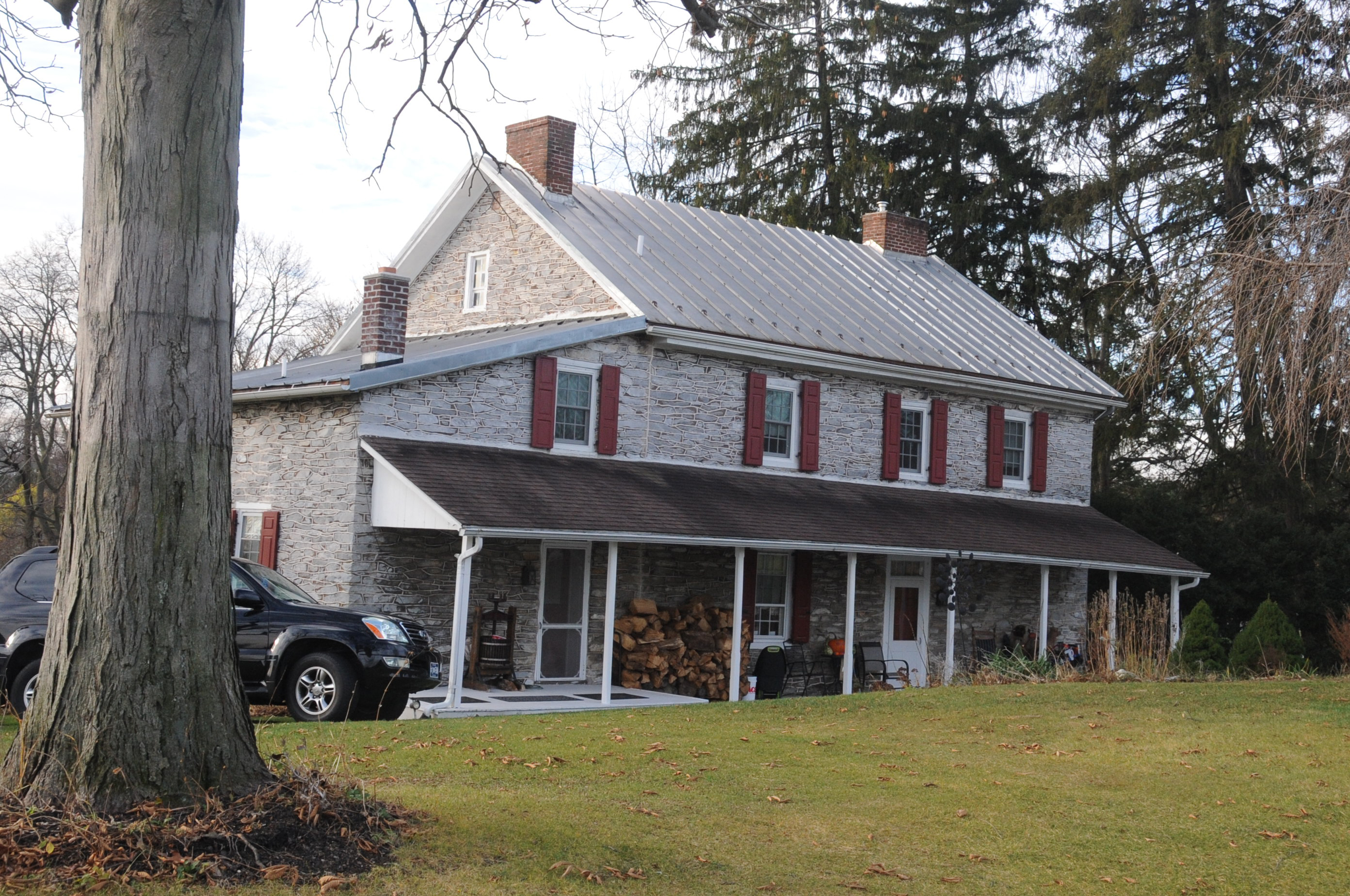
- House in 2016

- Location within Pennsylvania Location within the United States
- Location: 1412 Farmhouse Lane, Lower Swatara Township, Pennsylvania
- Coordinates: 40.2392°N 76.7640°W
- Area: 2.8 acres (1.1 ha)
- Built: 1788, 1880
- Architectural style: German vernacular
- NRHP reference No.: 11000644
- Added to NRHP: September 8, 2011

The Conrad and Margaret Allerman House also known as the Old Reliance Farm, is a historic home located at Lower Swatara Township, Dauphin County, Pennsylvania, United States. It was originally built in 1788, and is in the German vernacular tradition with influences from the Georgian style.

Conrad Allerman arrived in Pennsylvania as a teenager from the Rhineland in Germany. He married Margaret Eschenour, a widow with two children about 1780 and died in 1790 or 1792, survived by his wife and four children, Conrad, Anna Maria, Margaret, and Elizabeth. The elder Margaret lived in the house until her death in 1807. The younger Conrad bought the house from his three sisters in 1801 for 862 pounds, upon reaching the age of 21.

The house was added to the National Register of Historic Places in 2011.
