= Lower Swatara Township, Pennsylvania =

Township in Pennsylvania, US

Coordinates: 40°14′N 76°45′W

- Township
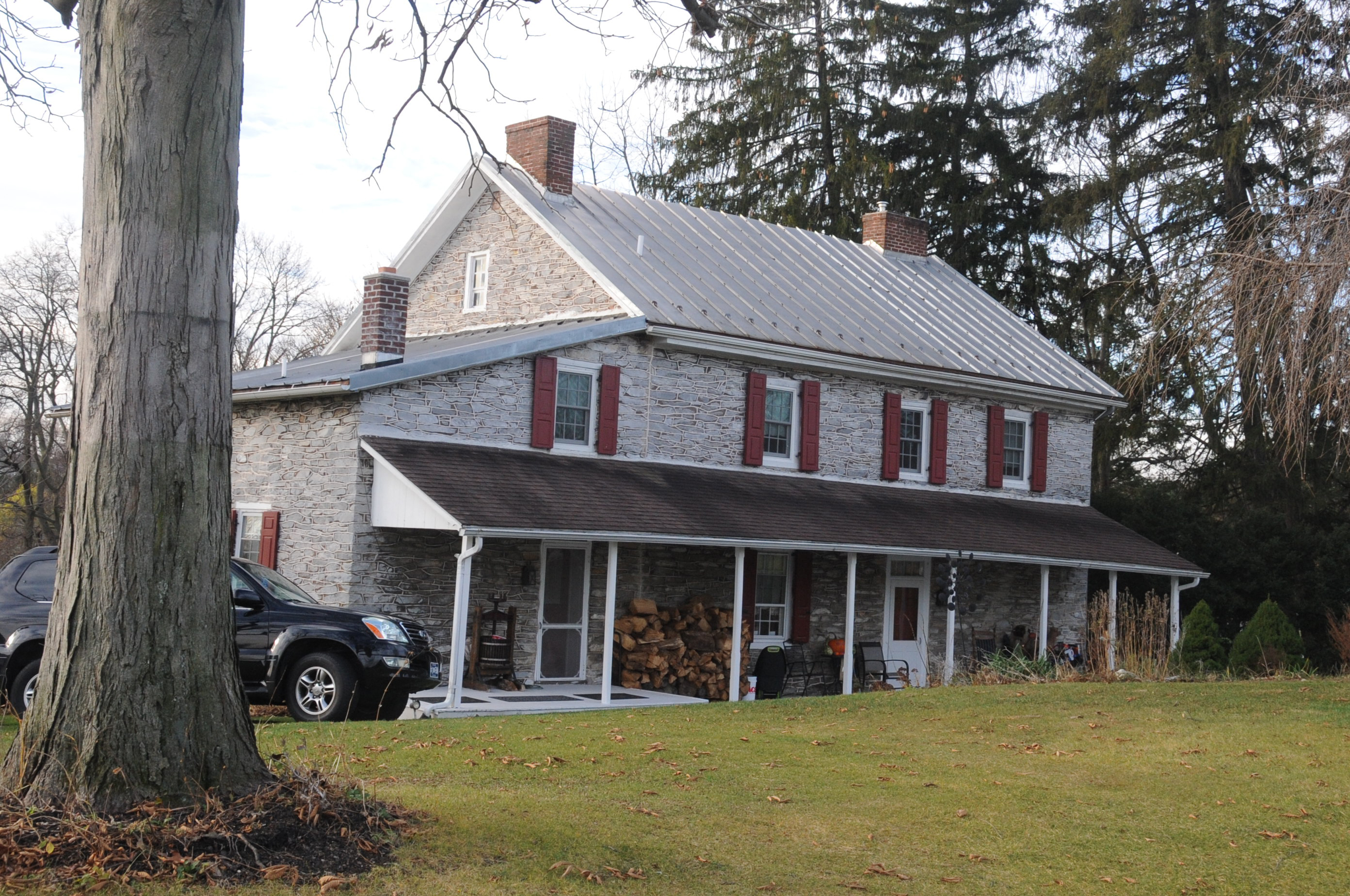
- The Conrad and Margaret Allerman House, a historic site in the township
- Motto: "A Progressive First Class Township"
- Location in Dauphin County and state of Pennsylvania.
- Country: United States
- State: Pennsylvania
- County: Dauphin
- Settled: 1717
- Incorporated: 1961

Government
  - Type: Board of Commissioners

Area
  - Total: 14.81 sq mi (38.36 km^{2})
  - Land: 12.33 sq mi (31.93 km^{2})
  - Water: 2.49 sq mi (6.44 km^{2})

Population (2020)
  - Total: 9,528 ▲
  - Estimate (2023): 9,797
  - Density: 711.1/sq mi (274.54/km^{2})
- Time zone: UTC-5 (Eastern (EST))
  - Summer (DST): UTC-4 (EDT)
- Postal codes: 17034, 17057, 17111, 17036
- Area code: 717
- FIPS code: 42-043-45120
- Website: www.lowerswatara.org

Lower Swatara Township is a township in Dauphin County, Pennsylvania, United States. The population was 9,528 at the 2020 census. Harrisburg International Airport and Penn State Harrisburg are located within the township. It shares a ZIP Code with the nearby borough of Middletown, and all locations in the township have Middletown addresses.

== History ==
Lower Swatara Township is bordered by the Susquehanna River on the south and Swatara Creek to the east. The township name is derived from a Native American language. The word is thought to be from a Susquehannock word meaning "Where we fed on eels." The Native Americans established a network of pathways through the area. Presbyterian settlers from Scotland and Ireland were followed by settlers from the German Palatinate. The first settlers erected their log homes along the banks of the Susquehanna and Swatara.

In 1729, Paxtang Township of Lancaster County was established. The spelling "Paxtang" is from the original Native name Peshtank, which meant "standing water".

On March 4, 1785, Dauphin County was formed from Lancaster County, named for the Dauphin of France, heir apparent to the French throne, whose country the area government wanted to honor for its assistance in the Revolutionary War. In August 1787, the legislature separated Paxtang Township into Upper Paxtang, Middle Paxtang and Lower Paxtang townships.

Lower Paxtang Township embraced the areas now occupied by Lower Swatara, Swatara, Lower Paxton, Derry and Susquehanna townships.

Lower Swatara Township was incorporated from Swatara Township on November 7, 1961, as a first class township. Within Lower Swatara is the Conrad and Margaret Allerman House, listed on the National Register of Historic Places. The township formerly housed the Star Barn Complex, which moved to neighboring Lancaster County in 2017.

== Geography ==
Lower Swatara Township is in southern Dauphin County, bordered by York County to the southwest across the Susquehanna River, by the boroughs of Highspire and Steelton to the west, by Swatara Township to the northwest and north, by Derry Township to the northeast across Swatara Creek, and by Londonderry Township and the borough of Middletown to the southeast. Unincorporated communities in Lower Swatara Township include Ebenezer in the north, Freys Grove in the east along Swatara Creek, Greenwood Hills near the center, and Meade Heights and Jednota in the south. Harrisburg International Airport occupies the southernmost land in the township, along the Susquehanna River.

According to the United States Census Bureau, the township has a total area of 14.8 square miles (38.3 km^{2}), of which 12.3 square miles (31.9 km^{2}) is land and 2.5 square miles (6.4 km^{2}), or 16.79%, is water. Most of the water area is in the Susquehanna River.

== Demographics ==
Historical population
Census	Pop.	Note	%±
2000	8,149		—
2010	8,268		1.5%
2020	9,528		15.2%
2023 (est.)	9,797		2.8%
U.S. Decennial Census

As of the census of 2000, there were 8,149 people, 3,003 households, and 2,201 families residing in the township. The population density was 672.3 inhabitants per square mile (259.6/km^{2}). There were 3,124 housing units at an average density of 257.7 per square mile (99.5/km^{2}). The racial makeup of the township was 93.70% White, 3.07% African American, 0.05% Native American, 1.53% Asian, 0.01% Pacific Islander, 0.58% from other races, and 1.06% from two or more races. Hispanic or Latino of any race were 1.91% of the population.

There were 3,003 households, out of which 33.1% had children under the age of 18 living with them, 60.3% were married couples living together, 9.7% had a female householder with no husband present, and 26.7% were non-families. 22.4% of all households were made up of individuals, and 6.8% had someone living alone who was 65 years of age or older. The average household size was 2.52 and the average family size was 2.94.

In the township, the population was spread out, with 23.4% under the age of 18, 9.8% from 18 to 24, 28.9% from 25 to 44, 25.4% from 45 to 64, and 12.5% who were 65 years of age or older. The median age was 38 years. For every 100 females there were 95.9 males. For every 100 females age 18 and over, there were 90.7 males.

The median income for a household in the township was $48,940, and the median income for a family was $58,203. Males had a median income of $39,980 versus $29,436 for females. The per capita income for the township was $23,271. About 3.0% of families and 5.1% of the population were below the poverty line, including 6.9% of those under age 18 and 3.5% of those age 65 or over.

== Economy ==
The US Airways subsidiary Allegheny Airlines had its headquarters on the grounds of Harrisburg International Airport in the township.

== Government ==
The township has the headquarters of the Pennsylvania Turnpike Commission and the Pennsylvania State Lottery.

== Transportation ==
Harrisburg International Airport is in the township.

== Education ==
It is in the Middletown Area School District.

The township has Robert G. Reid Elementary School, Middletown Area Middle School, and Middletown Area High School. The district planned the opening of Middletown Area Primary School, a consolidation of existing schools, in the township. Groundbreaking occurred in 2024.

Pennsylvania State University Harrisburg is in the township.
