= Jednota =

Jednota may refer to:

- Jednota bratrská, ecclesiastical province of the Moravian Church in the Czech Republic
- Jednota cooperative, Czechoslovak and Czech consumer cooperative
- Jednota, Pennsylvania, unincorporated community in the United States
- Kaszëbskô Jednota, association for Kashubians
