= Pittis =

Pittis is a surname. Notable people with the surname include:

- Domenic Pittis (born 1974), Canadian ice hockey player
- Florian Pittiş (1943–2007), Romanian actor, theatre director, singer, and radio producer
- Jonathan Pittis (born 1982), Canadian-born Italian professional ice hockey player
- Riccardo Pittis (born 1968), Italian basketball player

== See also ==
- Pettis (surname)
