= Marne Intrieri =

American football player (1907–1969)

Profile
- Position: Guard

Personal information
- Born: September 13, 1907; Steelton, Pennsylvania, U.S.
- Died: February 5, 1969 (aged 61); Lebanon, Pennsylvania, U.S.

Career information
- High school: Steelton
- College: Loyola (MD)

Career history
- Staten Island Stapletons (1932); Boston Redskins (1933–1934)

Career statistics
- Games played: 20
- Games started: 9
- Stats at Pro Football Reference

Marino Charles Intrieri (September 13, 1907 – February 5, 1969) was an American football guard in the National Football League (NFL) for the Staten Island Stapletons and the Boston Redskins. Born in Steelton, Pennsylvania, he attended Loyola College in Maryland.
