= Enhaut, Pennsylvania =

Unincorporated community in Pennsylvania, US

Coordinates: 40°13′54″N 76°49′37″W

- Census-designated place
- Location in Dauphin County and state of Pennsylvania.
- Country: United States
- State: Pennsylvania
- County: Dauphin
- Township: Swatara

Area
  - Total: 0.23 sq mi (0.60 km^{2})
  - Land: 0.23 sq mi (0.60 km^{2})
  - Water: 0 sq mi (0.00 km^{2})
- Elevation: 490 ft (150 m)

Population (2020)
  - Total: 1,022
  - Density: 4,431.6/sq mi (1,711.05/km^{2})
- Time zone: UTC-5 (Eastern (EST))
  - Summer (DST): UTC-4 (EDT)
- ZIP code: 17113
- Area code: 717
- FIPS code: 42-23704
- GNIS feature ID: 1174268

Enhaut is an unincorporated community and census-designated place (CDP) located in Swatara Township, Dauphin County, Pennsylvania, United States. The community was formerly part of the census-designated place of Bressler-Enhaut-Oberlin, before splitting into three separate CDPs for the 2010 census. As of the 2010 census, the population in Enhaut was 1,007.

Enhaut is bordered to the southwest by the borough of Steelton, to the southeast by Bressler, and to the northeast by Oberlin. It is 4 miles (6 km) southeast of the state capitol in Harrisburg.

== Demographics ==
Historical population
Census	Pop.	Note	%±
2020	1,022		—
U.S. Decennial Census
