= Star Barn Complex =

- U.S. National Register of Historic Places
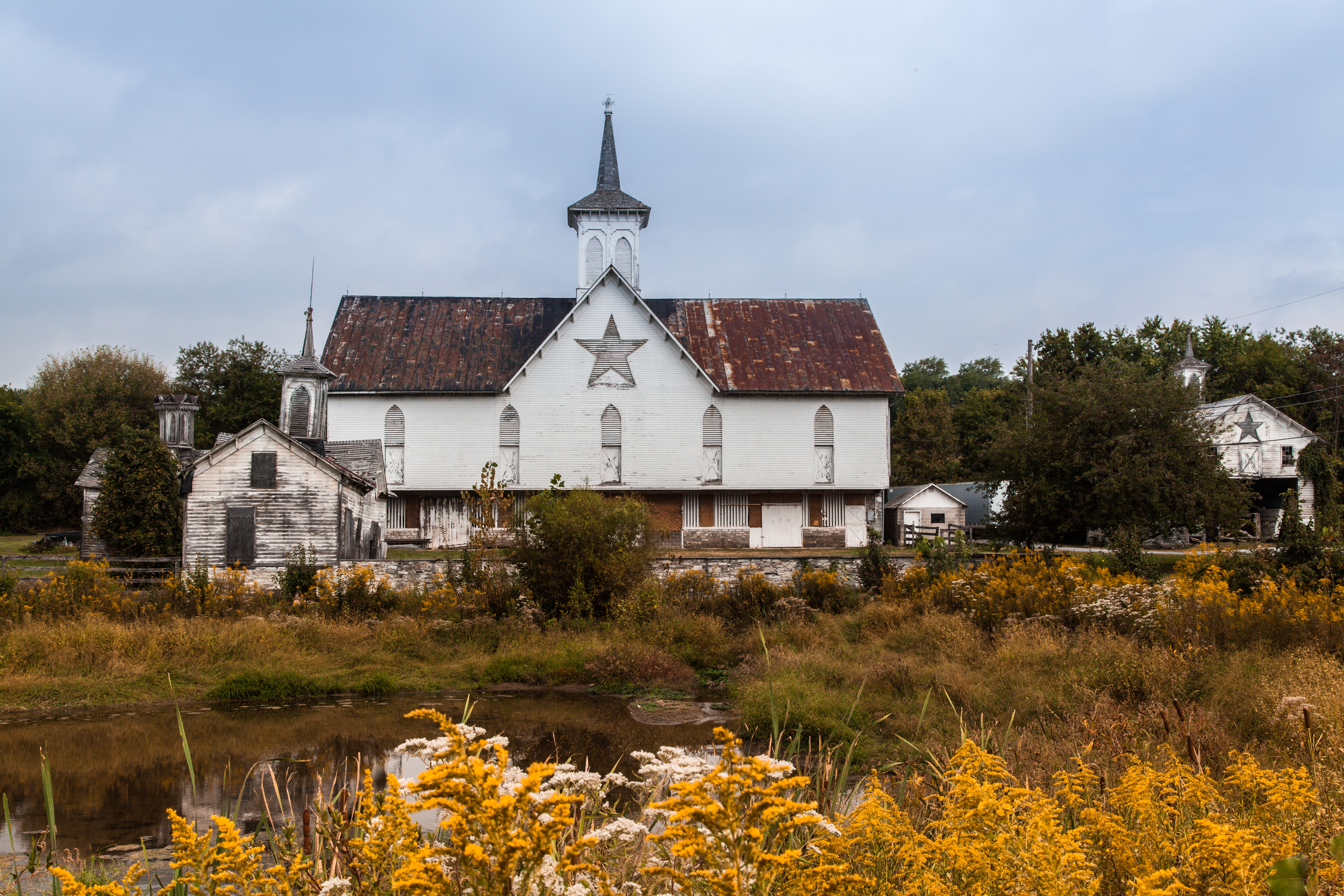

- Location within Pennsylvania Location within the United States
- Location: Nissley Dr. at PA 283, Lower Swatara Township, Pennsylvania
- Coordinates: 40°13′25″N 76°46′17″W
- Area: 3 acres (1.2 ha)
- Built: 1872
- Architect: Reichert, Daniel
- Architectural style: Gothic Revival
- NRHP reference No.: 00000845
- Added to NRHP: July 27, 2000

The Star Barn Complex, also known as the John Motter Barn and Outbuildings and "Walnut Hill," is an historic farm outbuilding complex that was located in Lower Swatara Township, Dauphin County, Pennsylvania, United States.

Added to the National Register of Historic Places in 2000, it was dismantled in October 2015 and then moved to a site in Lancaster County for reassembly and preservation.

== History and architectural features ==
This historic property includes a large barn, a pig barn (c. 1872), a carriage house (c. 1872), a chicken coop (c. 1872), a grain silo, and a milk house. The main barn, known as the Star Barn, was built in 1872, and is a five-bay, Gothic Revival-style frame building. It features an immense cupola atop a cross-gable roof.

== Move to Lancaster County ==
The Star Barn was dismantled beginning in October 2015 and then moved to a site in Lancaster County, where it has been reassembled and preserved at the Ironestone Ranch in Elizabethtown.
