= Pettis =

Pettis may refer to:

== People ==
- Pettis (surname)
- Pettis Norman (1939–2025), American football player

== Places ==
- Pettis County, Missouri
- Pettis Township, Adair County, Missouri
- Pettis Township, Platte County, Missouri
