= Bressler, Pennsylvania =

Unincorporated community in Pennsylvania, US

Coordinates: 40°13′46″N 76°49′12″W

- Village
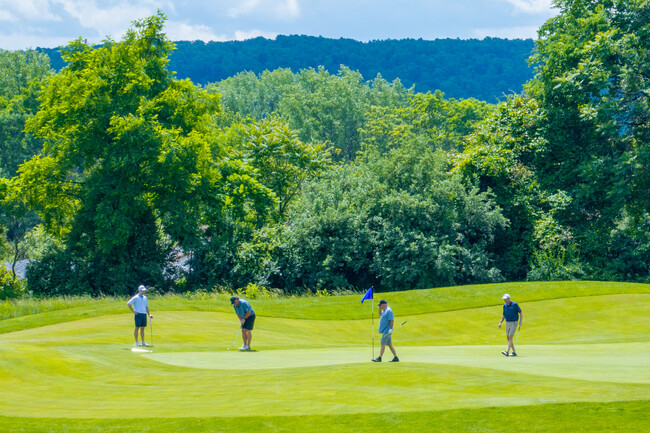
- Fire station

- Location in Dauphin County and state of Pennsylvania.
- Country: United States
- State: Pennsylvania
- County: Dauphin
- Township: Swatara

Area
  - Total: 0.32 sq mi (0.82 km^{2})
  - Land: 0.32 sq mi (0.82 km^{2})
  - Water: 0 sq mi (0.00 km^{2})
- Elevation: 490 ft (150 m)

Population (2020)
  - Total: 1,512
  - Density: 4,773.0/sq mi (1,842.86/km^{2})
- Time zone: UTC-5 (Eastern (EST))
  - Summer (DST): UTC-4 (EDT)
- ZIP Code: 17113
- FIPS code: 42-08432
- GNIS feature ID: 1170204

Bressler is a Village and census-designated place (CDP) located in Swatara Township, Dauphin County, in the U.S. state of Pennsylvania. The community was formerly part of the census-designated place of Bressler-Enhaut-Oberlin, before splitting into three separate CDPs for the 2010 census. As of the 2010 census the population of Bressler was 1,437.

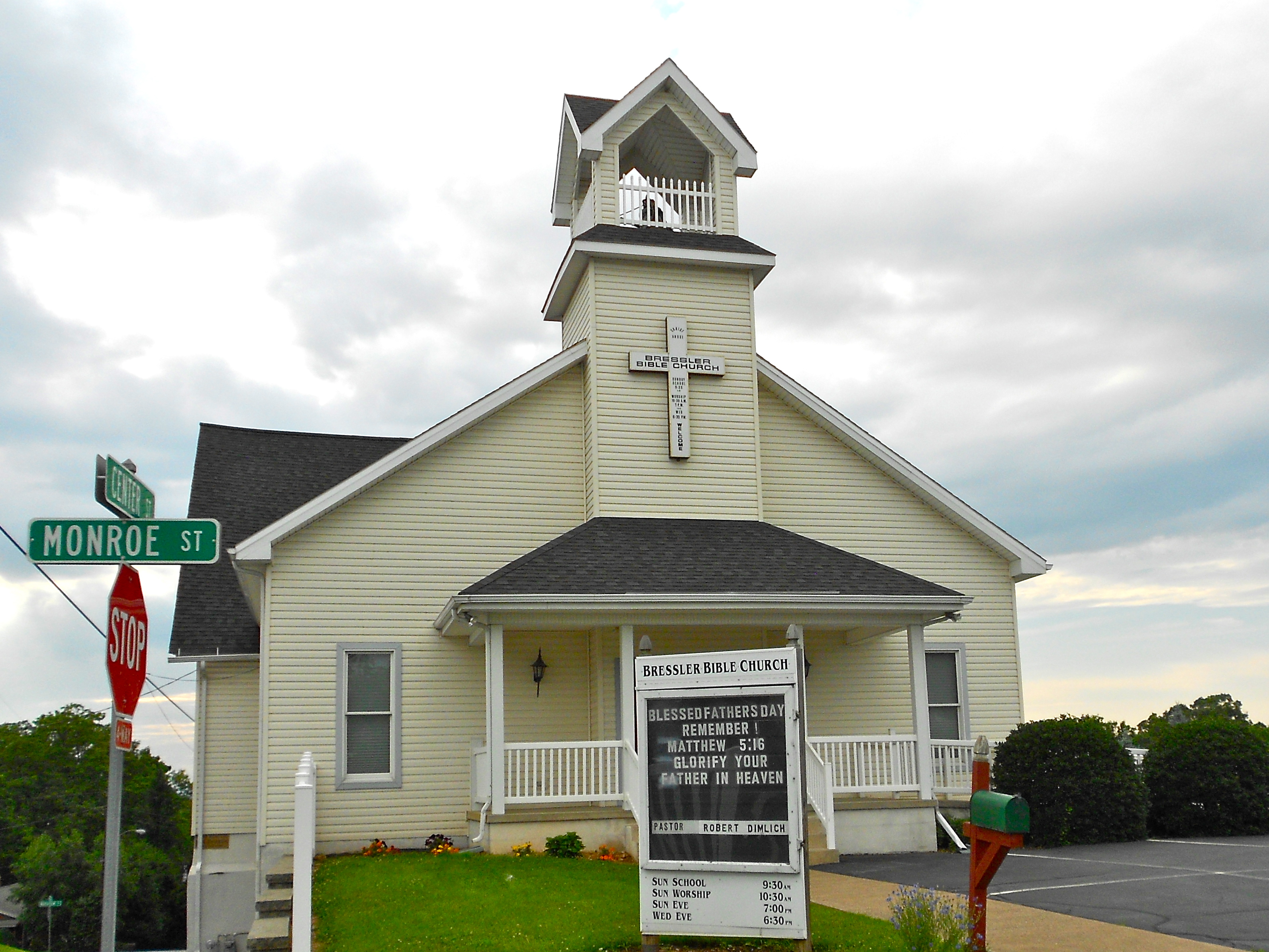
Bressler Bible Church

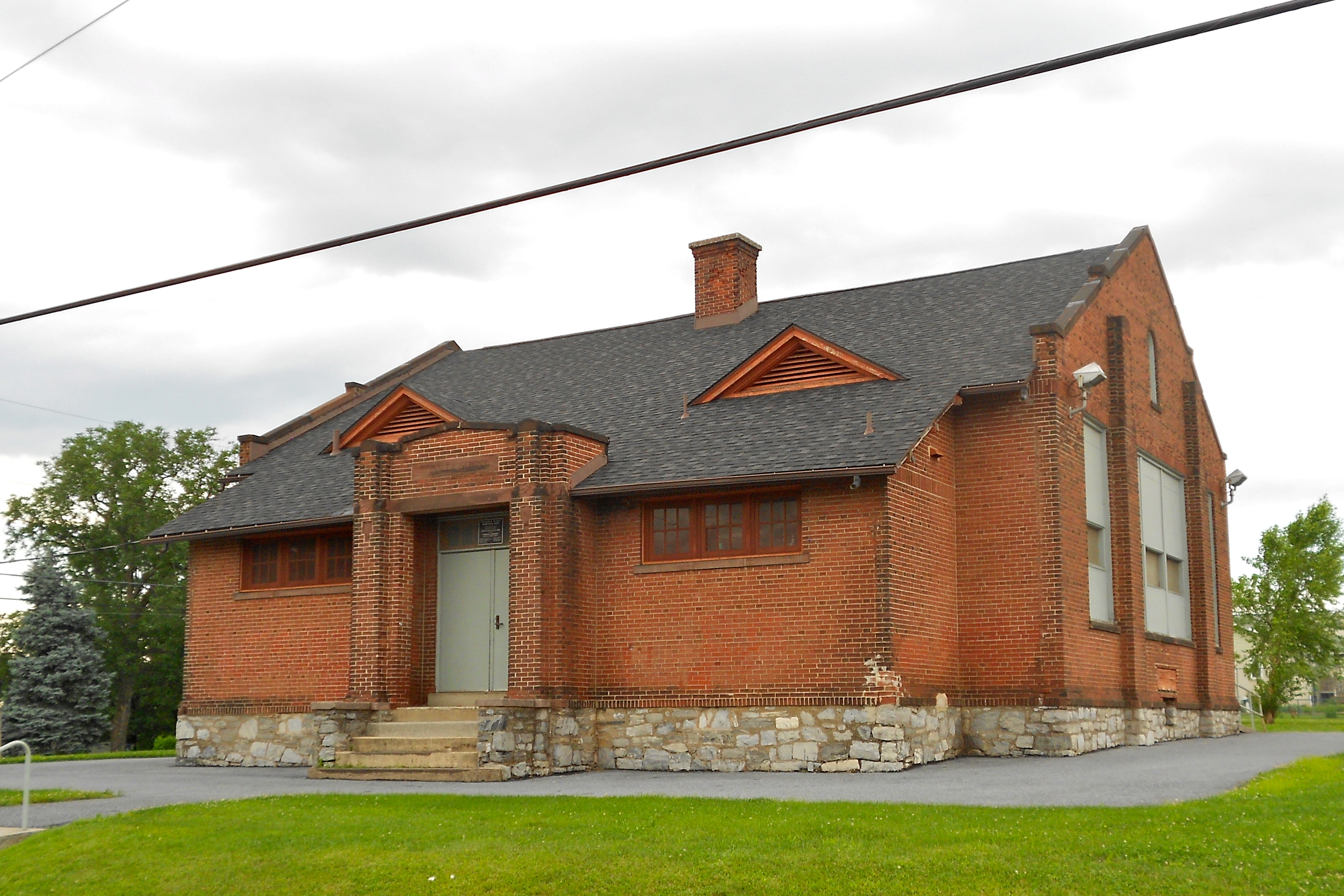
Old school building

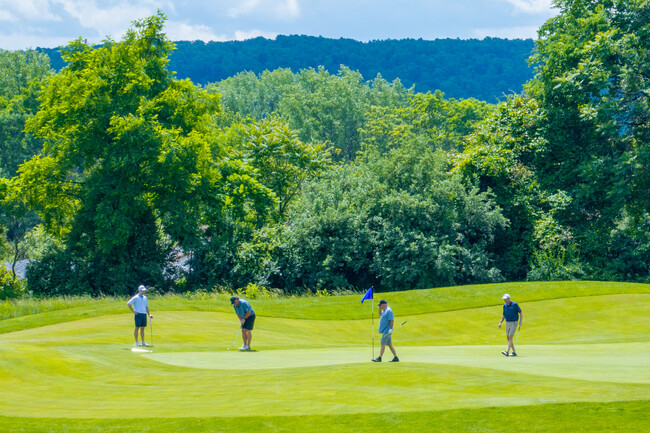

Bressler is located in southern Dauphin County, in the southwestern part of Swatara Township. It is part of the Harrisburg–Carlisle metropolitan statistical area. It is bordered to the south by the borough of Steelton, to the west by Enhaut, and to the north by Oberlin. It is 5 miles (8 km) southeast of downtown Harrisburg.

== Demographics ==
Historical population
Census	Pop.	Note	%±
2020	1,512		—
U.S. Decennial Census

As of the 2020 U.S. census, there were 1,437 people living in the CDP. The racial makeup of the CDP was 68.9% White, 17.6% Black, 0.1% Native American, 0.5% Asian, 0.1% from some other race and 2.5% from two or more races. 10.3% were Hispanic or Latino of any race.
