= Bressler-Enhaut-Oberlin, Pennsylvania =

Bressler-Enhaut-Oberlin
- Former CDP
- Location within the U.S. state of Pennsylvania Bressler-Enhaut-Oberlin (the United States)
- Coordinates: 40°13′57″N 76°49′9″W
- Country: United States
- State: Pennsylvania
- County: Dauphin

Area
  - Total: 0.58 sq mi (1.5 km^{2})
  - Land: 0.58 sq mi (1.5 km^{2})

Population (2000)
  - Total: 2,809
  - Density: 4,900/sq mi (1,900/km^{2})
- Time zone: UTC-5 (Eastern (EST))
  - Summer (DST): UTC-4 (EDT)

Bressler-Enhaut-Oberlin was a census-designated place (CDP) in Swatara Township, Dauphin County, Pennsylvania, United States. The population was 2,809 at the 2000 census. For the 2010 census it was split into three CDPs, Bressler, Enhaut, and Oberlin. The area is part of the Harrisburg–Carlisle Metropolitan Statistical Area.

== Geography ==
Bressler-Enhaut-Oberlin was located at 40°13′57″N 76°49′9″W (40.232590, -76.819304).

According to the United States Census Bureau, the CDP had a total area of 0.6 square miles (1.6 km^{2}), all of it land.

== Demographics ==
As of the census of 2000, there were 2,809 people, 1,157 households, and 776 families residing in the CDP. The population density was 4,802.6 inhabitants per square mile (1,854.3/km^{2}). There were 1,206 housing units at an average density of 2,061.9 per square mile (796.1/km^{2}). The racial makeup of the CDP was 82.41% White, 13.35% African American, 0.21% Native American, 0.25% Asian, 0.04% Pacific Islander, 1.74% from other races, and 1.99% from two or more races. Hispanic or Latino of any race were 7.44% of the population.

There were 1,157 households, out of which 29.9% had children under the age of 18 living with them, 47.0% were married couples living together, 15.1% had a female householder with no husband present, and 32.9% were non-families. 29.1% of all households were made up of individuals, and 12.0% had someone living alone who was 65 years of age or older. The average household size was 2.42 and the average family size was 2.98.

In the CDP, the population was spread out, with 24.5% under the age of 18, 6.6% from 18 to 24, 30.6% from 25 to 44, 22.2% from 45 to 64, and 16.1% who were 65 years of age or older. The median age was 38 years. For every 100 females, there were 88.9 males. For every 100 females age 18 and over, there were 85.6 males.

The median income for a household in the CDP was $33,191, and the median income for a family was $37,997. Males had a median income of $30,710 versus $25,820 for females. The per capita income for the CDP was $16,373. About 11.0% of families and 11.9% of the population were below the poverty line, including 22.9% of those under age 18 and 9.1% of those age 65 or over.

== See also ==
- Swatara Township, Dauphin County, Pennsylvania
