= Ralph Farina =

American football player (1905–1984)

Ralph "Nick" Farina
Profile
- Position: Center

Personal information
- Born: February 21, 1905; Steelton, Pennsylvania, United States
- Died: September 1984 (aged 79)
- Listed height: 5 ft 8 in (1.73 m)
- Listed weight: 180 lb (82 kg)

Career information
- College: Villanova University

Career history
- Pottsville Maroons (1927)
- Stats at Pro Football Reference

Ralph Robert "Nick" Farina (February 21, 1905 – September 1984) was a professional football player from Steelton, Pennsylvania. Farina attended and played college football for Villanova University from 1922 until 1924. He played one game in the National Football League during the 1927 season with the Pottsville Maroons. He was later the owner-operator of Farina Motors Inc. in Steelton, Pennsylvania. He also later worked as a salesman for E.M. Warner Motos Inc.
