= Calver Island =

- U.S. National Register of Historic Places
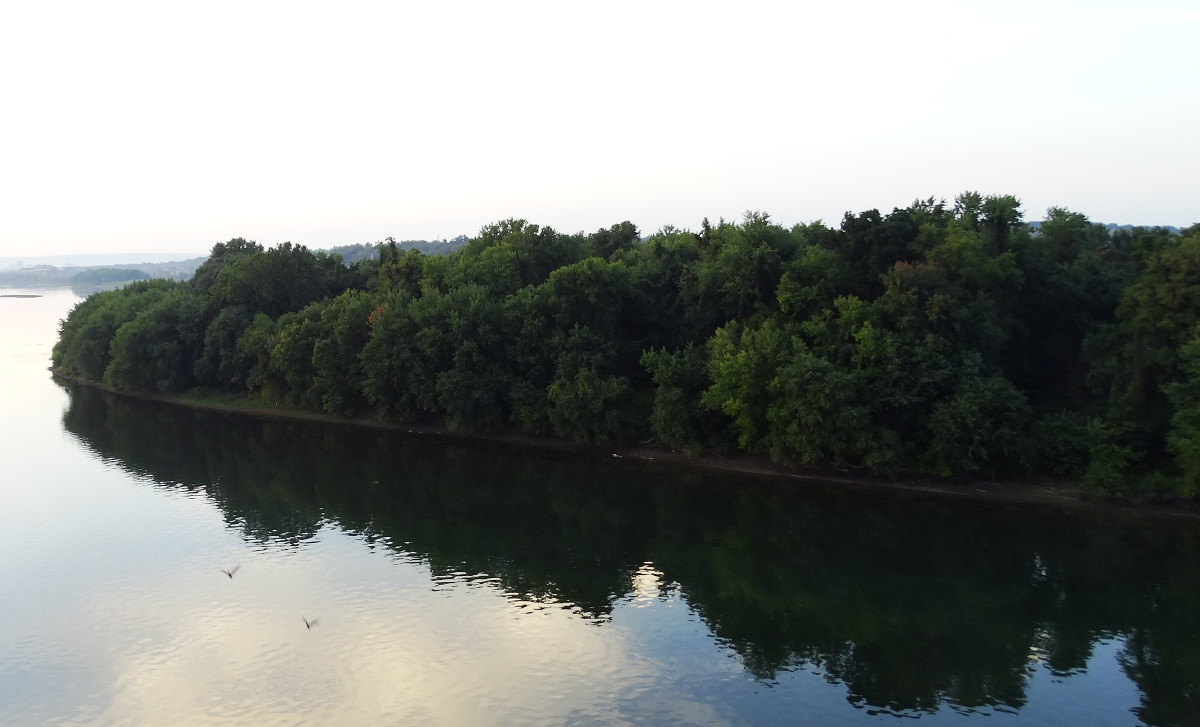

- Location within Pennsylvania Location within the United States
- Location: In the Susquehanna River, southeast of Harrisburg in Swatara Township, Pennsylvania
- Coordinates: 40°12′20″N 76°48′24″W
- Area: 12.5 acres (5.1 ha)
- NRHP reference No.: 06001256
- Added to NRHP: January 17, 2007

Calver Island is a historic archaeological site located on the Susquehanna River in Swatara Township, Dauphin County, Pennsylvania, United States. It is known as Pennsylvania Site 36DA89. Geographically, Calver Island is a "midchannel" island formed from the coalescence of two longitudinal shoals that merged as one landform. It was only then upon the unification of the land, estimated at 5200 years before present, where it would've been inhabitable by Native Americans.

In the 2000s, a bridge for the Pennsylvania Turnpike—between Fairview Township, York County and Swatara Township, Dauphin County—which spanned through the island was in need of replacement by the Pennsylvania Turnpike Commission. Because it required review by the U.S. Army Corps of Engineers, the National Historic Preservation Act also required that the project not impact archaeological information, which was first identified there in the 1970s. With some additional digs, the island was found to be eligible to be added to the National Register of Historic Places in 2007. Most digging then occurred in several block excavations in the immediate area of potential effect (APE) prior to construction of the new bridge.

Calver Island is a stratified site, so found artifacts' originate from Early Archaic through Late Woodland periods. The island itself had one of the most intact stratigraphic records in the entire state.
