= Inglenook, Pennsylvania =

Unincorporated community in Pennsylvania, US

- Unincorporated community
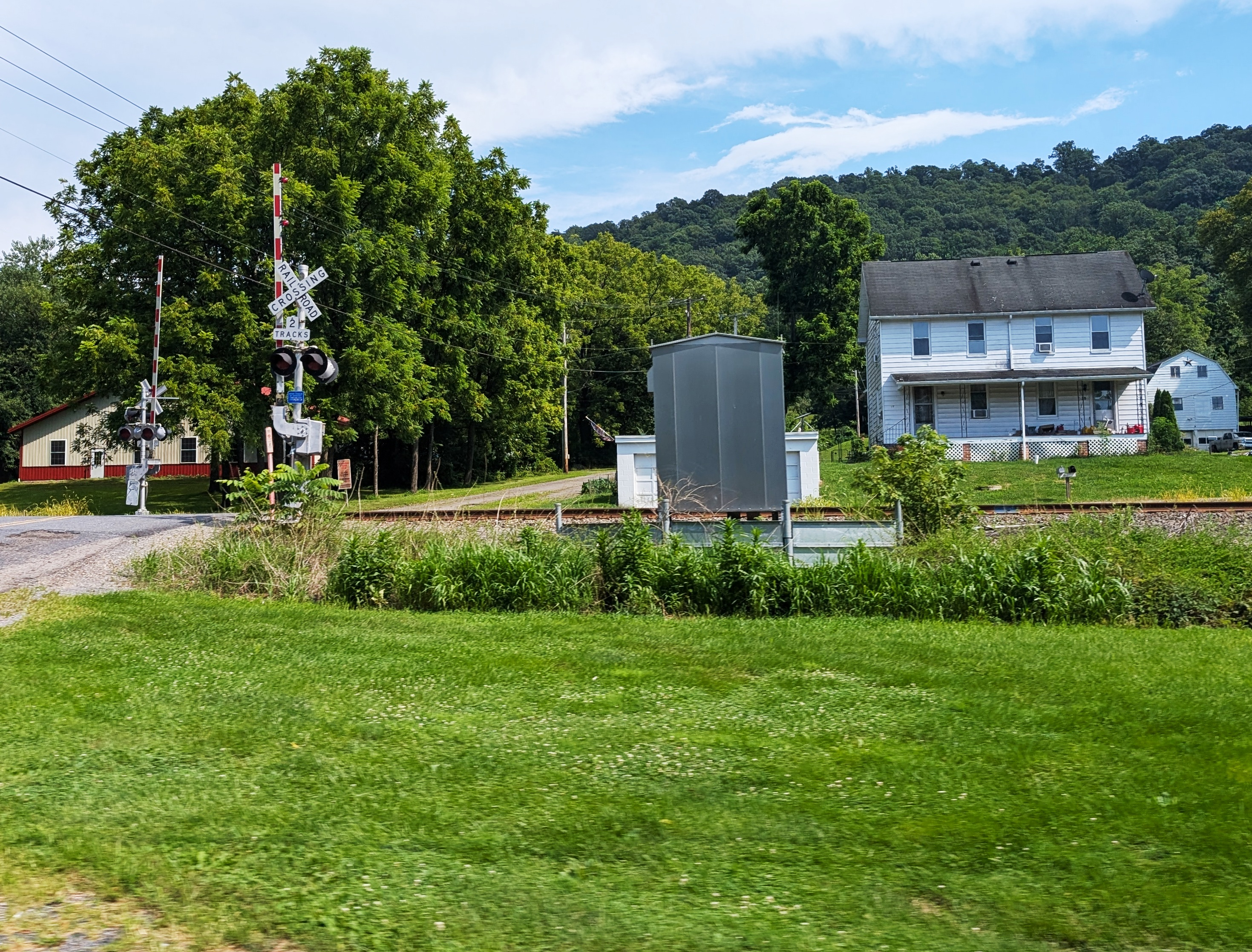
- Buildings in Inglenook

- Location within the state of Pennsylvania Inglenook (the United States)
- Coordinates: 40°24′47″N 76°58′52″W
- Country: United States
- State: Pennsylvania
- County: Dauphin
- Township: Reed
- Time zone: UTC-5 (Eastern (EST))
  - Summer (DST): UTC-4 (EDT)

Inglenook is an unincorporated community in Reed Township, Dauphin County, Pennsylvania, United States. Inglenook is part of the Harrisburg–Carlisle Metropolitan Statistical Area.
