= Bill Pettis =

American bodybuilder (1942–2016)

- Born: December 23, 1942; Oberlin, Pennsylvania, U.S.
- Died: September 27, 2016 (aged 73); Pennsylvania, U.S.
- Occupation: Competitive bodybuilder

Bill Pettis (December 23, 1942 - September 27, 2016) was an American competitive bodybuilder. Pettis was friends with Arnold Schwarzenegger when they both trained in Venice Beach starting in the 1970s. Pettis was known for the biggest biceps in the world. Pettis was the subject of a photograph poster made by Garry Winogrand for the 1984 Summer Olympics.

== Early life ==
Bill Pettis was born on December 23 or 27, 1942. He was born and raised in Oberlin, Pennsylvania, the youngest of seven children. His father, Collier, worked at the Bethlehem Steel mill. His mother, Ora, worked at the department of motor vehicles. He played on the football team at Central Dauphin High School with his twin brother, Bobby. The two brothers enrolled at Maryland State College (now University of Maryland Eastern Shore) but dropped out for financial reasons.

== Career ==
In 1973, Bill and Bobby moved to Los Angeles, attracted to the burgeoning bodybuilder movement. While Bobby moved back to Oberlin, Bill stayed and regularly trained at Gold's Gym at Venice Beach. Pettis was friends with Arnold Schwarzenegger. Pettis was known for strong upper-body workouts. Joe Weider reported that Pettis's biceps were 23.25 inches, larger than Schwarzenegger's.

Pettis never won a bodybuilding award. According to peers and observers, Pettis was overly focused on arms and had underdeveloped other parts of his physique. Pettis also was under-practiced at the posing part of bodybuilding competitions. Pettis did not take anabolic steroids. Pettis supported himself by moving pianos and working security at clubs.

Pettis was the subject of a poster for the 1984 Summer Olympics where he is photographed next to a barbell. According to his contemporaries, the photographer, Garry Winogrand, chose Pettis as a subject for his authenticity and for the clash between his soft expression and weightlifting. Pettis described the poster as the highlight of his life and was sought for autographs; however, he made only one dollar on the poster and did not receive any share of the revenues for the poster.

Pettis worked for Joe Gold at World Gym until Gold's death in 2004. Pettis became homeless and was known to frequent the Venice Beach Boardwalk as of 2016.

== Death ==
On September 27, 2016, Pettis's body, alongside personal belongings, was found by police in Spring Creek, in Swatara Township. An autopsy suggested that he likely drowned accidentally when trying to cross the creek. Pettis's family told police that they had bought him a bus ticket to visit for a family gathering. Police said Pettis had dementia and had wandered away.

Pettis's personal belongings included photographs of Pettis as a young bodybuilder, photographs of Pettis with Arnold Schwarzenegger, and a Christian devotional. Arnold Schwarzenegger responded to Pettis's passing, "Bill Pettis was one of my favorite training partners. He had the biggest arms I've ever seen but more importantly, he had the biggest heart. I'm going to miss him."
