= Vaughn, Pennsylvania =

Unincorporated community in Pennsylvania, US

- Unincorporated community
- Location within Pennsylvania
- Coordinates: 40°19′19″N 76°47′6″W
- Country: United States
- State: Pennsylvania
- County: Dauphin
- Township: Lower Paxton
- Elevation: 541 ft (165 m)
- Time zone: UTC-5 (Eastern (EST))
  - Summer (DST): UTC-4 (EDT)
- Area code: 717

Vaughn is an unincorporated community in Lower Paxton Township, Pennsylvania, United States in the Harrisburg-Carlisle Metropolitan Statistical Area, near the census-designated place of Paxtonia. The latitude is 40.322 and the longitude -76.785; the elevation is 541 ft.
