= Enterline, Pennsylvania =

Unincorporated community in Pennsylvania, US

Enterline, Pennsylvania Enderlein
- Unincorporated community
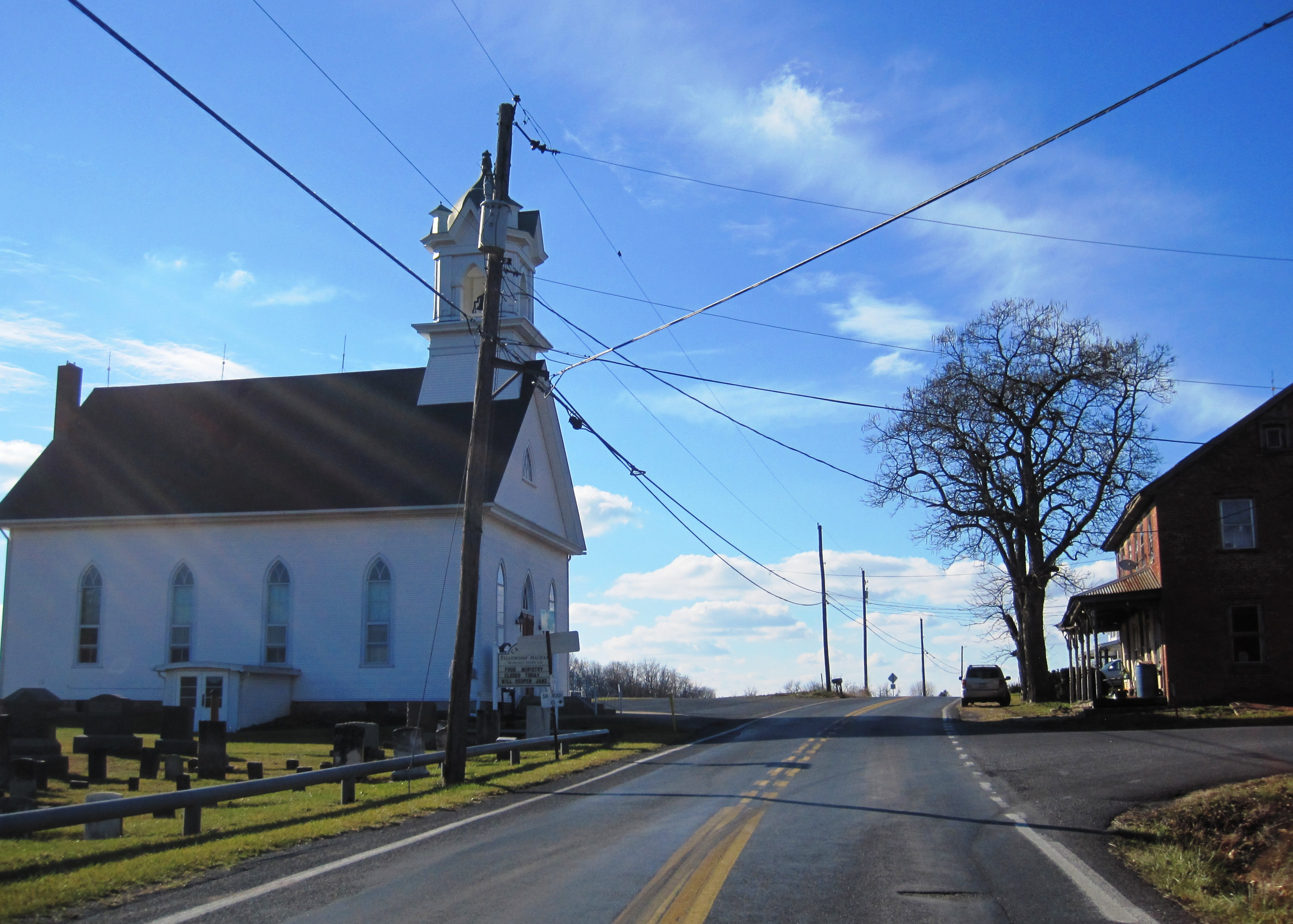
- Intersection of Powells Valley Road and Enders Road

- Location within Pennsylvania
- Coordinates: 40.463°N 76.842°W
- Country: United States
- State: Pennsylvania
- County: Dauphin
- Elevation: 659 ft (201 m)
- Time zone: UTC-5 (Eastern (EST))
  - Summer (DST): UTC-4 (EDT)
- Area code: 717
- GNIS feature ID: 1174282

Enterline (Pennsylvania German: Enderlein) is an unincorporated community in Wayne Township, Dauphin County, Pennsylvania, United States, and is a part of the Harrisburg–Carlisle metropolitan statistical area in the United States.

== History ==
Enterline was named for a family of settlers, originally spelled "Enderlein", as is the current Pennsylvania German name.
