= Palmdale, Pennsylvania =

Unincorporated community in Pennsylvania, US

Coordinates: 40.298°N 76.619°W

- Census-designated place
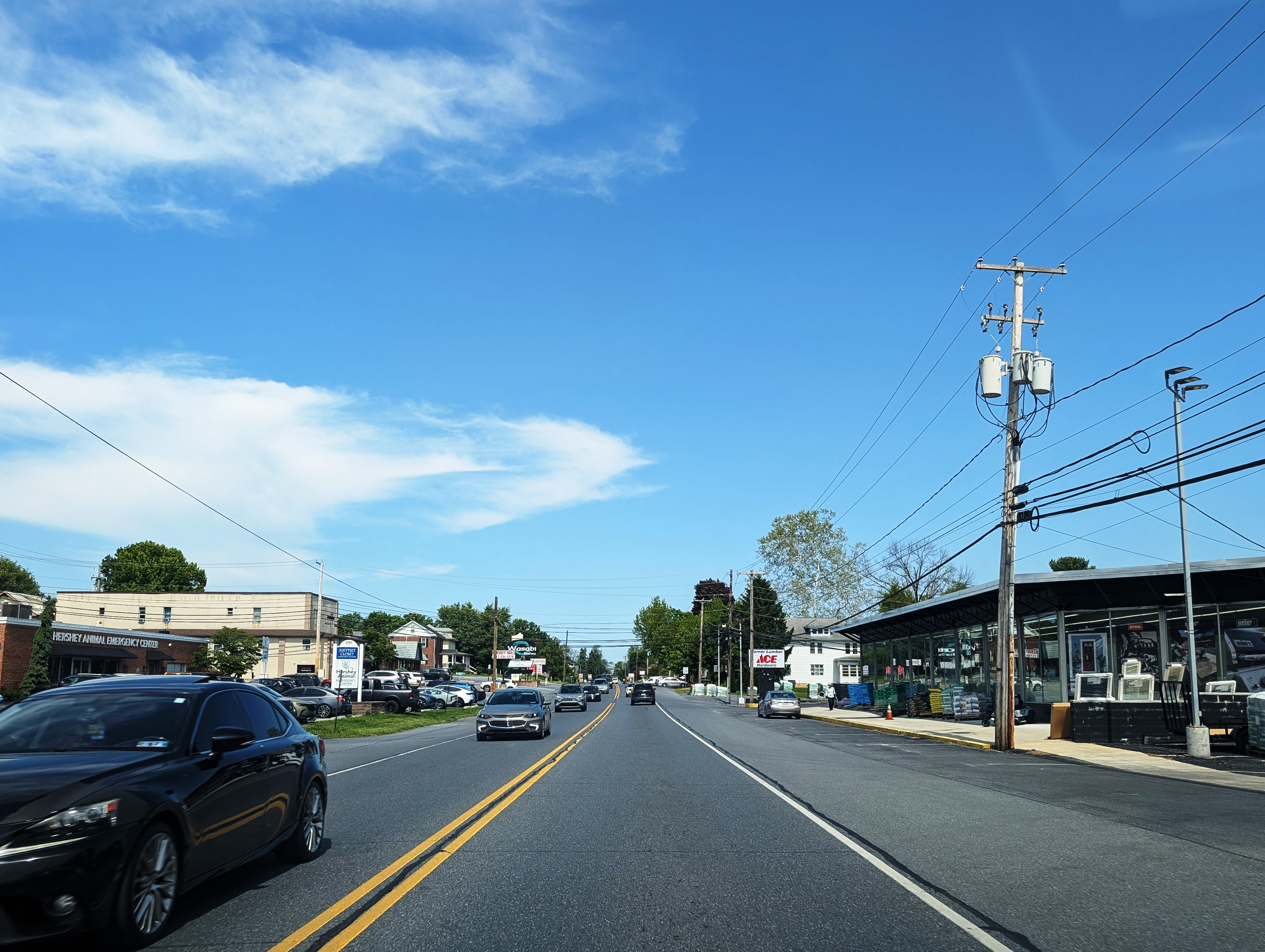
- US 422 eastbound in Palmdale

- Location in Dauphin County and state of Pennsylvania
- Country: United States
- State: Pennsylvania
- County: Dauphin
- Township: Derry

Area
  - Total: 1.49 sq mi (3.85 km^{2})
  - Land: 1.48 sq mi (3.84 km^{2})
  - Water: 0 sq mi (0.00 km^{2})
- Elevation: 433 ft (132 m)

Population (2020)
  - Total: 1,308
  - Density: 881.1/sq mi (340.19/km^{2})
- Time zone: UTC-5 (Eastern (EST))
  - Summer (DST): UTC-4 (EDT)
- ZIP Code: 17033
- FIPS code: 42-57648
- GNIS feature ID: 1193079

Palmdale is an unincorporated community and census-designated place (CDP) in Derry Township, Dauphin County, Pennsylvania, United States. As of the 2010 census the population was 1,308. Palmdale is in the Harrisburg–Carlisle metropolitan statistical area.

Palmdale is in eastern Derry Township and is bordered to the north, west, and south by the community of Hershey. The eastern border of Palmdale is with the borough of Palmyra in Lebanon County.

U.S. Route 422 (E. Chocolate Avenue) is the main road through Palmdale. To the east it leads 12 miles (19 km) to Lebanon and 40 miles (64 km) to Reading, while to the west it leads via US 322 17 miles (27 km) to Harrisburg.

Historical population
Census	Pop.	Note	%±
2020	1,308		—
U.S. Decennial Census
