= Heckton, Pennsylvania =

Unincorporated community in Pennsylvania, US

- Unincorporated community
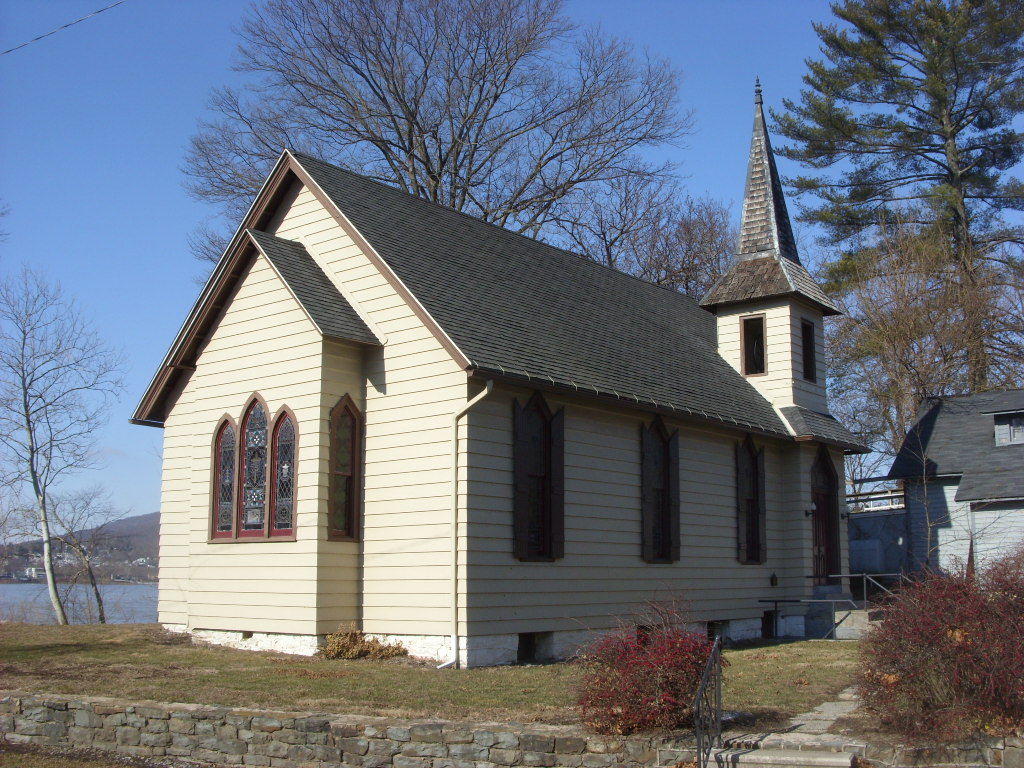

- Location within the state of Pennsylvania Heckton (the United States)
- Coordinates: 40°21′7″N 76°54′58″W
- Country: United States
- State: Pennsylvania
- County: Dauphin
- Township: Middle Paxton
- Time zone: UTC-5 (Eastern (EST))
  - Summer (DST): UTC-4 (EDT)

Heckton is an unincorporated community which is located in Middle Paxton Township, Dauphin County, Pennsylvania, United States. It lies near the east bank of the Susquehanna River, north of Fort Hunter, and is part of the Harrisburg–Carlisle Metropolitan Statistical Area.

== History ==
This community was named for Dr. Lewis Heck. Reared in Shippensburg, Dr. Heck settled here in 1832, practiced medicine and served as a representative in the Pennsylvania General Assembly during the American Civil War. He also operated a large steam sawmill nearby from 1843 until 1890, and that specific area was known as Heckton Mills.

By 1899 the small community was known as Heckton.

U.S. Routes 22 and 322 pass through Heckton as a four-lane expressway, close to the Susquehanna River, with full access from PA 443 (Fishing Creek Valley Road). US 22/322 leads south, approximately 6.6 miles (11 km) to Harrisburg and northwest, about 1.3 miles (2 km) to the borough of Dauphin.

Years ago, Heckton could be reached by travelling North Front Street/River Road (Old 22), about 6.2 miles (10 km) from Harrisburg to Heckton Road; however, Heckton Road was bisected when U.S. Routes 22 and 322 were expanded to a limited access expressway. As a result, the Heckton Cemetery (old Riverview Cemetery) and Cemetery Road, which parallels US 22/322 can be accessed from PA 443, just northeast of the US 22/322 interchange.

The historic Heckton Church was erected in 1885 for use by Methodists. In 2009, it was moved by Fort Hunter Mansion and Park to its current location at 5264 North Front Street. The church is available for weddings.
