= Ebenezer, Pennsylvania =

Unincorporated community in Pennsylvania, U.S.

Coordinates: 40.235°N 76.776°W

Ebenezer is an unincorporated community in Lower Swatara Township, Dauphin County, Pennsylvania, United States, and is a part of the Harrisburg-Carlisle Metropolitan Statistical Area.
