= Oberlin Gardens, Pennsylvania =

Unincorporated community in Pennsylvania, U.S.

Coordinates: 40.244°N 76.822°W

Oberlin Gardens is an unincorporated community in Swatara Township in Dauphin County, Pennsylvania. It is located in the Harrisburg–Carlisle metropolitan statistical area.
