= Waynesville, Pennsylvania =

Unincorporated community in Pennsylvania, U.S.

Coordinates: 40.452°N 76.879°W

Waynesville is an unincorporated community in Wayne Township, Dauphin County, Pennsylvania, United States, located in the Harrisburg–Carlisle metropolitan statistical area.
