= Oakleigh, Pennsylvania =

Unincorporated community in Pennsylvania, U.S.

Coordinates: 40.258°N 76.821°W

Oakleigh is an unincorporated community in Dauphin County, Pennsylvania. It is part of the Harrisburg–Carlisle metropolitan statistical area.

Oakleigh is located on the intersection of Fortieth Street (Francis L. Cadden Parkway) and Derry Street in Swatara Township.
