= Old Furnace, Pennsylvania =

Coordinates: 41°04′24″N 76°56′28″W

Old Furnace is located in Union County, Pennsylvania, about 15 miles (24 km) south of the city of Williamsport and about 70 miles (110 km) north of Harrisburg.
