= Pettis (surname) =

Pettis is a surname. Notable people with the name include:

- Anthony Pettis (born 1987), American mixed martial artist
- Austin Pettis (born 1989), American football wide receiver
- Bill Pettis (born 1942-2016), American competitive bodybuilder
- Billy James Pettis (1913–1979), American mathematician
- Bre Pettis (born 1972/1973), American entrepreneur, video blogger and multi-artist
- Bridget Pettis (born 1971), American basketball player
- Dante Pettis (born 1995), American football player
- Dianne Ruth Pettis (1955–2008), New Zealand novelist and journalist
- Fontaine H. Pettis (~1799?–1858), American slave catcher, fraudster
- Garret Pettis (born 1989), American soccer player
- Gary Pettis (born 1958), American baseball player
- Jerry Pettis (1916–1975), American politician
- Jill Pettis (born 1952), New Zealand politician
- Madison Pettis (born 1998), American actress and model
- Mark Pettis (born 1950), American politician from Wisconsin
- Michael Pettis (born 1958), American economist
- Pierce Pettis (born 1954), American singer-songwriter
- Sergio Pettis (born 1993), American mixed martial artist, brother of Anthony
- Shirley Neil Pettis (1924–2016), U.S. Representative from California, wife of Jerry
- Solomon Newton Pettis (1827–1900), American politician
- Spencer Darwin Pettis (1802–1831), U.S. Representative from Missouri
- Will Pettis (born 1977), Arena football wide receiver, defensive back
