= Dixon University Center =

Coordinates: 40.2949°N 76.9044°W

- Type: Higher Education Center; Meeting and Event Space
- Location: Harrisburg, Pennsylvania, USA
- Website: http://www.dixonuniversitycenter.org
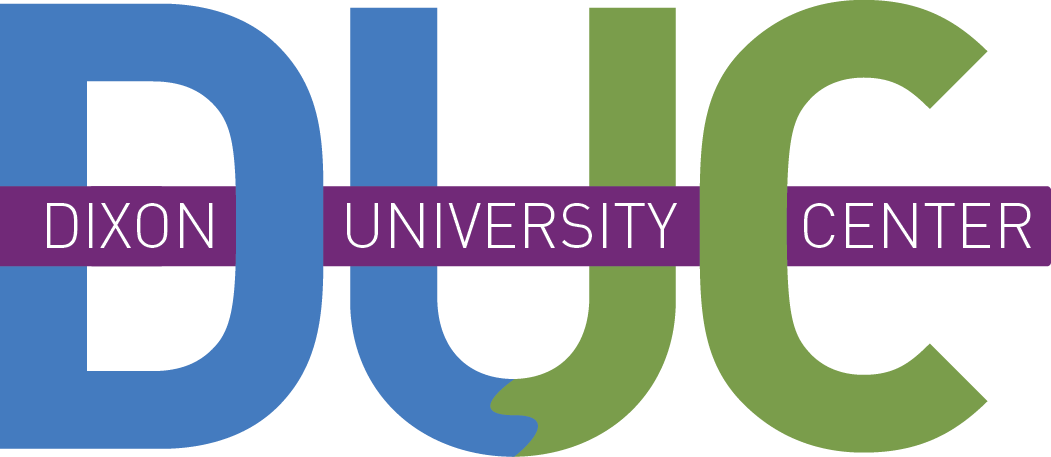

Dixon University Center was a former higher education center made up of college and university-level programs from a consortium of schools in the Pennsylvania State System of Higher Education (PASSHE) located in Harrisburg, Pennsylvania. The facility was located on the former campus of Harrisburg Academy. The site was leased from 1988 until 1991, when it was purchased by PASSHE. In 2022, the campus was sold to the Jewish Federation of Greater Harrisburg to create the Alexander Grass Campus for Jewish Life.

== Colleges and universities ==
- Bloomsburg University of Pennsylvania
- Evangelical Seminary
- Immaculata University
- Indiana University of Pennsylvania
- Lebanon Valley College
- Lock Haven University of Pennsylvania
- Millersville University of Pennsylvania
- Shippensburg University of Pennsylvania
