= Jednota Estates =

Unincorporated community in Pennsylvania, US

Coordinates: 40°12′16″N 76°45′31″W

Jednota Estates was the headquarters of the First Catholic Slovak Union (FCSU) located in Lower Swatara Township, Dauphin County, Pennsylvania, operating from 1911 to 1976 in what is now Jednota, Pennsylvania. FCSU provided insurance and other benefits to Slovak immigrants living in the United States. Over the years the site included an orphanage, school, print shop for the FCSU newspaper, Motherhouse of the New Order of Nuns and St. Anne’s Home for the Aged. The FCSU headquarters moved to Ohio in 1969 and the Jednota Home was leased to the Diocese of Harrisburg in 1976.

The property has been redeveloped with an office complex and electronics distribution facility, with a memorial to deceased FCSU members maintained along Rosedale Avenue.
