= Oak Ridge, Clearfield County, Pennsylvania =

Unincorporated community in Pennsylvania, US

Oak Ridge, Pennsylvania
- Unincorporated community
- Location within Pennsylvania
- Coordinates: 40°50′58″N 78°29′47″W
- Country: United States
- State: Pennsylvania
- County: Clearfield
- Elevation: 1,762 ft (537 m)
- Time zone: UTC-5 (Eastern (EST))
  - Summer (DST): UTC-4 (EDT)
- Area code: 814
- GNIS feature ID: 1204316

Oak Ridge is an unincorporated community in Clearfield County, Pennsylvania, United States. The community is 8.8 miles (14.2 km) south of Curwensville.
