= Oil City, Cambria County, Pennsylvania =

Unincorporated community in Pennsylvania, US

- Unincorporated community
- Location within the state of Pennsylvania Oil City (the United States)
- Coordinates: 40°24′8″N 78°38′25″W
- Country: United States
- State: Pennsylvania
- County: Cambria
- Time zone: UTC-5 (EST)
  - Summer (DST): UTC-4 (EDT)

Also see Oil City, in Venango County, Pennsylvania.

Oil City is an unincorporated community in east-central Cambria County, Pennsylvania, United States, located at the confluence of Bens Creek and the Little Conemaugh River. The bridge over Bens Creek is on the National Register of Historic Places.
