= Steelton High School =

- U.S. National Register of Historic Places
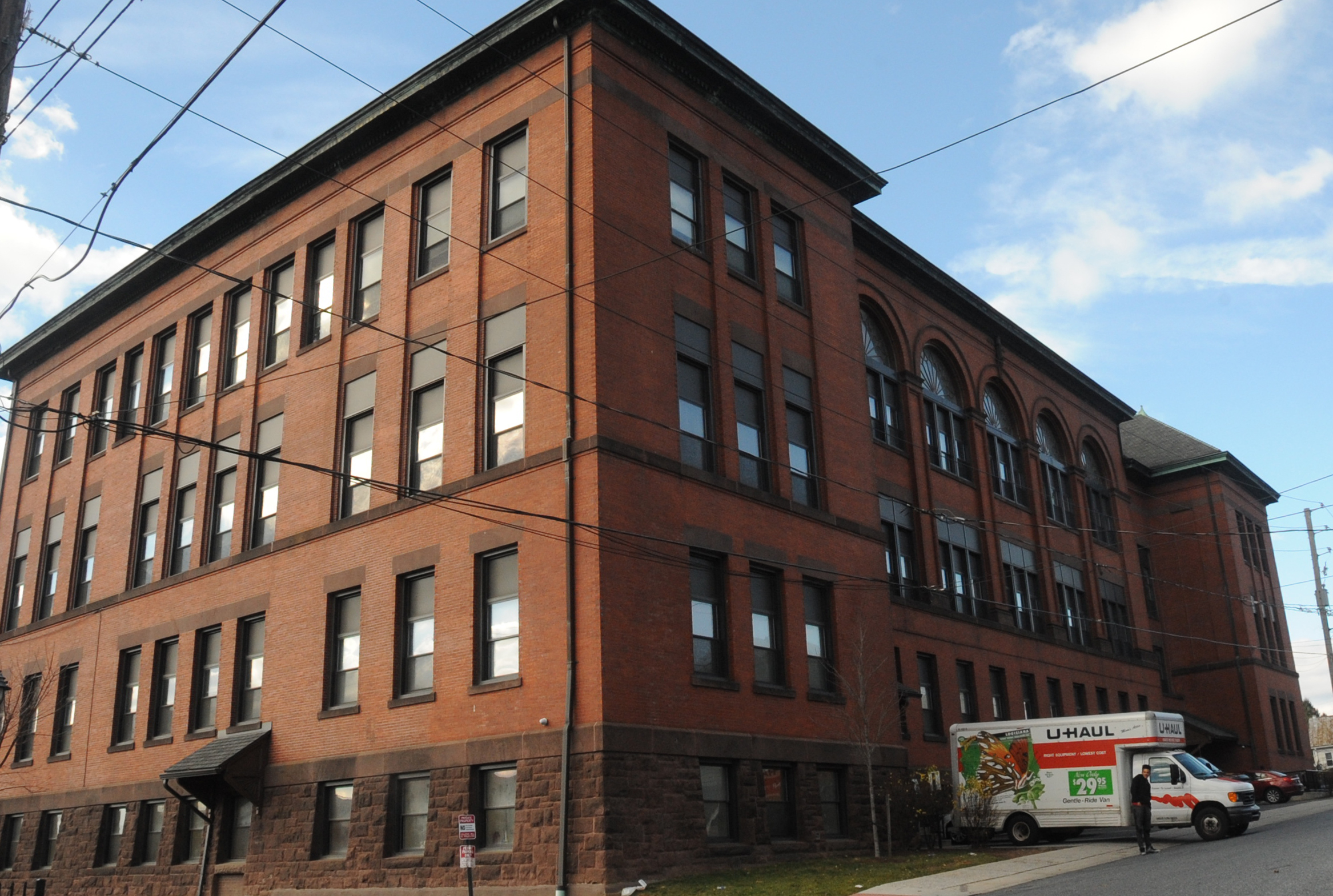
- The historic high school, now loft apartments

- Location within Pennsylvania Location within the United States
- Location: 100 South Fourth Street, Steelton, Pennsylvania
- Coordinates: 40°14′6.3″N 76°50′12″W
- Built: 1882, 1928, 1990
- Architectural style: Late Victorian, Beaux Arts, French Renaissance
- MPS: Educational Resources of Pennsylvania MPS
- NRHP reference No.: 11000645
- Added to NRHP: September 8, 2011

Steelton High School, historically known as Felton School, is a historic high school building located at Steelton, Pennsylvania, United States. It was built in various stages between 1882 and 1990.

It was added to the National Register of Historic Places in 2011.
