= Oberlin, Pennsylvania =

Unincorporated community in Pennsylvania, US

- Census-designated place
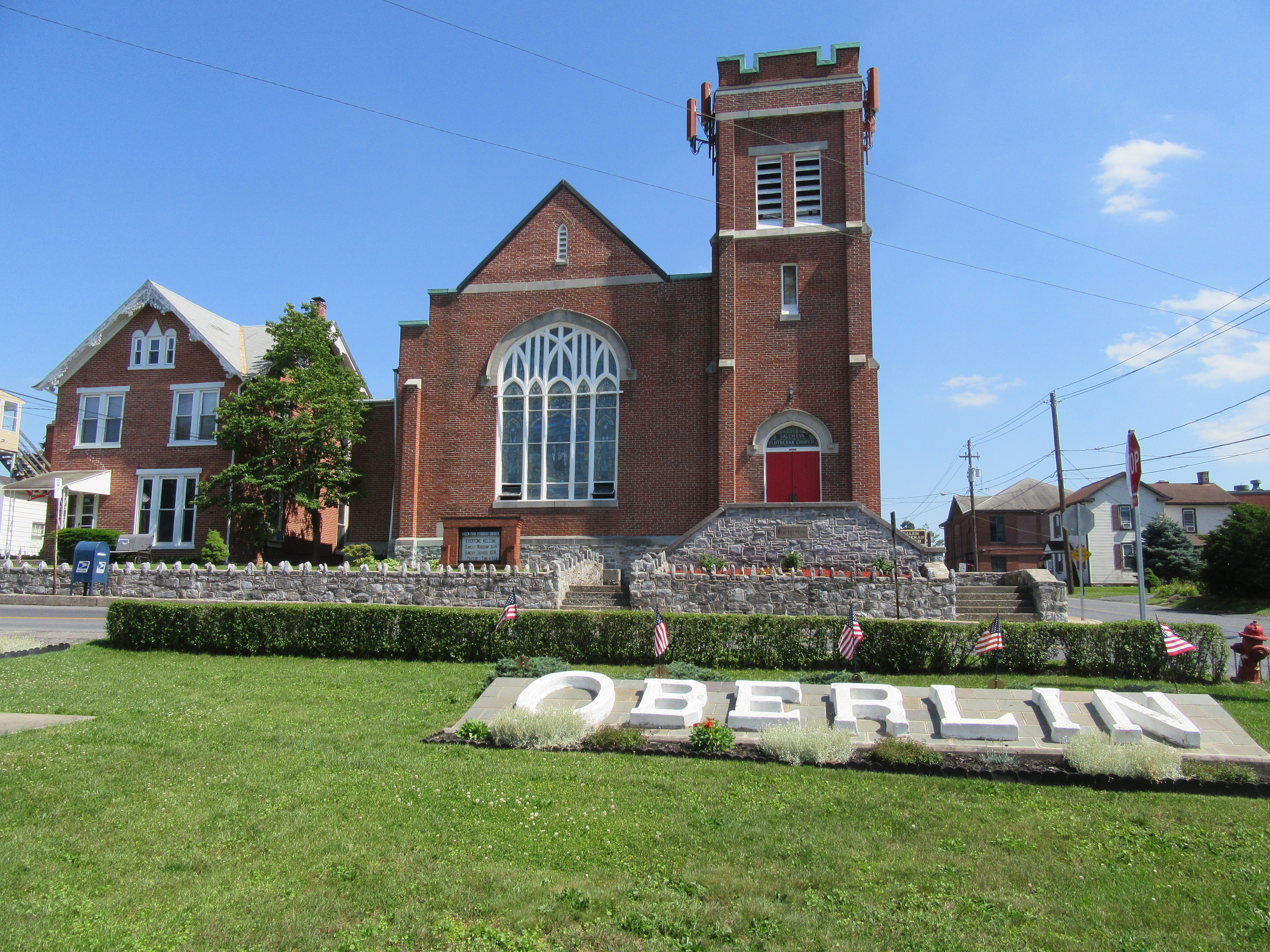

- Location in Dauphin County and state of Pennsylvania.
- Country: United States
- State: Pennsylvania
- County: Dauphin
- Township: Swatara

Area
  - Total: 0.13 sq mi (0.34 km^{2})
  - Land: 0.13 sq mi (0.34 km^{2})
  - Water: 0 sq mi (0.00 km^{2})
- Elevation: 570 ft (170 m)

Population (2020)
  - Total: 670
  - Density: 5,161.5/sq mi (1,992.85/km^{2})
- Time zone: UTC-5 (Eastern (EST))
  - Summer (DST): UTC-4 (EDT)
- ZIP code: 17113
- FIPS code: 42-56264
- GNIS feature ID: 1182858

Oberlin is an unincorporated community and census-designated place (CDP) located in Swatara Township, Dauphin County, Pennsylvania, United States. The community was part of the census-designated place of Bressler-Enhaut-Oberlin, before it was split into three separate CDPs for the 2010 census. As of the 2010 census, the population was 588.

Historical population
Census	Pop.	Note	%±
2020	670		—
U.S. Decennial Census

== Notable people ==
- Bill Pettis, competitive bodybuilder
