= Swatara Township, Dauphin County, Pennsylvania =

Township in Pennsylvania, US

Coordinates: 40°14′59″N 76°48′59″W

- Township
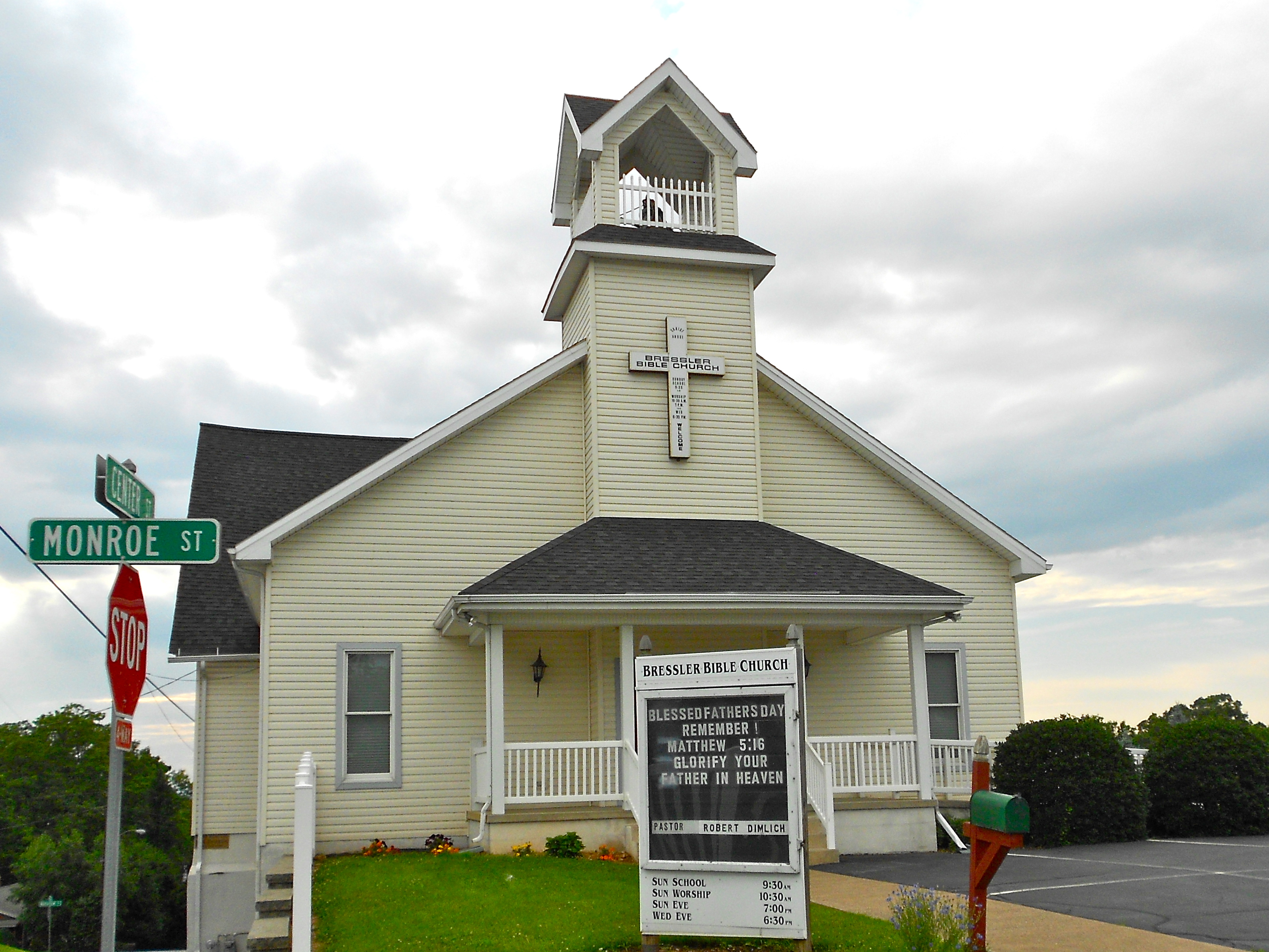
- Bressler Bible Church

- Location in Dauphin County and state of Pennsylvania.
- Country: United States
- State: Pennsylvania
- County: Dauphin
- Incorporated: 1799

Government
  - Type: Board of Commissioners

Area
  - Total: 15.53 sq mi (40.22 km^{2})
  - Land: 13.05 sq mi (33.80 km^{2})
  - Water: 2.48 sq mi (6.42 km^{2})

Population (2020)
  - Total: 27,827 ▲
  - Estimate (2023): 27,787
  - Density: 2,132/sq mi (823.2/km^{2})
- Time zone: UTC-5 (Eastern (EST))
  - Summer (DST): UTC-4 (EDT)
- Area code: 717
- FIPS code: 42-043-75672
- Website: www.swataratwp.com

Swatara Township is a township in Dauphin County, Pennsylvania, United States. The population was 27,827 at the 2020 census.

== History ==
In 1729, the Paxtang Township of Lancaster County was established. The spelling "Paxtang" is from the original Indian name Peshtank, which meant "standing water".

On March 4, 1785, Dauphin County was formed from Lancaster County, with the word "Dauphin" referring to the Dauphin of France, the heir apparent to the French throne whose country the area government wanted to honor for its assistance in the Revolutionary War. In August 1787 the legislature separated Paxtang Township into Upper Paxtang, Middle Paxtang, and Lower Paxtang townships.

Lower Paxtang Township embraced the areas now known as Lower Swatara, Swatara, Lower Paxton, Derry, and Susquehanna townships.

In 1799, a court order divided Lower Paxton Township into two equal parts. "Swatara" was the name chosen for the southern part of the area. The word is thought to be from a Susquehannock word meaning "Where we fed on eels." Swatara Township was named directly from Swatara Creek.

Within Swatara Township, Calver Island in the Susquehanna River was listed on the National Register of Historic Places in 2007.

== Geography ==
According to the U.S. Census Bureau, the township has a total area of 15.5 square miles (40.2 km^{2}), of which 13.1 square miles (33.8 km^{2}) is land and 2.5 square miles (6.4 km^{2}), or 15.97%, is water.

Census-designated places (unincorporated communities) in Swatara Township:

- Bressler-Enhaut-Oberlin, a CDP in 2000, was split into three CDPs for the 2010 census:
  - Bressler
  - Enhaut
  - Oberlin
- Lawnton
- Rutherford

== Demographics ==
Historical population
| Census | Pop. | Note | %± |
|---|---|---|---|
| 1970 | 17,176 | | — |
| 1980 | 18,796 | | 9.4% |
| 1990 | 19,661 | | 4.6% |
| 2000 | 22,367 | | 13.8% |
| 2010 | 23,366 | | 4.5% |
| 2020 | 27,827 | | 19.1% |
| 2023 (est.) | 27,787 | | −0.1% |
U.S. Decennial Census

As of the 2020 census, there were 27,284 people and 9,292 households. The population density was 2,132.11 inhabitants per square mile (823.21/km^{2}). There were 9,068 housing units at an average density of 685.2 per square mile (264.6/km^{2}). The racial makeup of the township was 61.8% White, 23.6% African American, 0.2% Native American, 6.9% Asian, 0.2% Pacific Islander, and 4.6% from two or more races. Hispanic or Latino of any race were 9.0% of the population.

There were 9,292 households, out of which 29.9% had children under the age of 18 living with them, 49.4% were married couples living together, 13.4% had a female householder with no husband present, and 33.6% were non-families. 29.0% of all households were made up of individuals, and 11.2% had someone living alone who was 65 years of age or older. The average household size was 2.37 and the average family size was 2.93.

In the township, the population was spread out, with 22.2% under the age of 18, 8.0% from 18 to 24, 31.8% from 25 to 44, 22.2% from 45 to 64, and 15.9% who were 65 years of age or older. The median age was 38 years. The female population was 52.1%.

The median income for a household in the township was $61,758. The per capita income for the township was $29,255. About 7.6% of the population was below the poverty line.

== Notable person ==
- Johann Jacob Friedrich Krebs, fraktur painter
