= Steelton, Pennsylvania =

Borough in Pennsylvania, US

- Borough
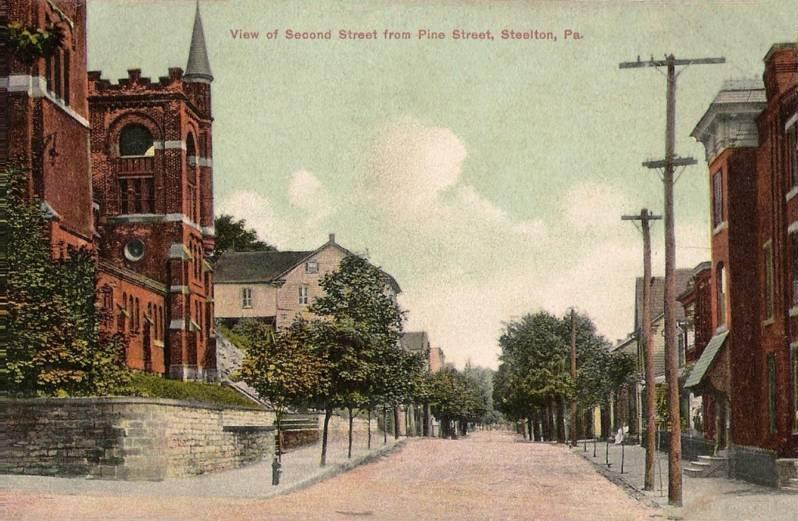
- Second Street in 1910

- Motto(s): "Our Renaissance Continues..." & "The Little Town with a Big Heart"
- Location in Dauphin County and the U.S. state of Pennsylvania.

- Location in Pennsylvania and the United States Steelton (the United States)
- Coordinates: 40°13′52″N 76°49′56″W
- Country: United States
- State: Pennsylvania
- County: Dauphin
- Settled: 1866
- Incorporated: 1880

Government
  - Type: Borough Council
  - Mayor: Natashia Ross (D)

Area
  - Total: 1.90 sq mi (4.91 km^{2})
  - Land: 1.90 sq mi (4.91 km^{2})
  - Water: 0 sq mi (0.00 km^{2})
- Elevation: 315 ft (96 m)

Population (2020)
  - Total: 6,263
  - Estimate (2021): 6,245
  - Density: 3,145.3/sq mi (1,214.39/km^{2})
- Time zone: UTC-5 (Eastern (EST))
  - Summer (DST): UTC-4 (EDT)
- ZIP code: 17113
- Area code: 717
- FIPS code: 42-73888
- Website: www.steeltonpa.com

Steelton is a borough in Dauphin County, Pennsylvania, United States, 4 miles (6 km) southeast of the state capital, Harrisburg. The population was 6,263 at the 2020 census. The borough is part of the Harrisburg metropolitan area.

== History ==
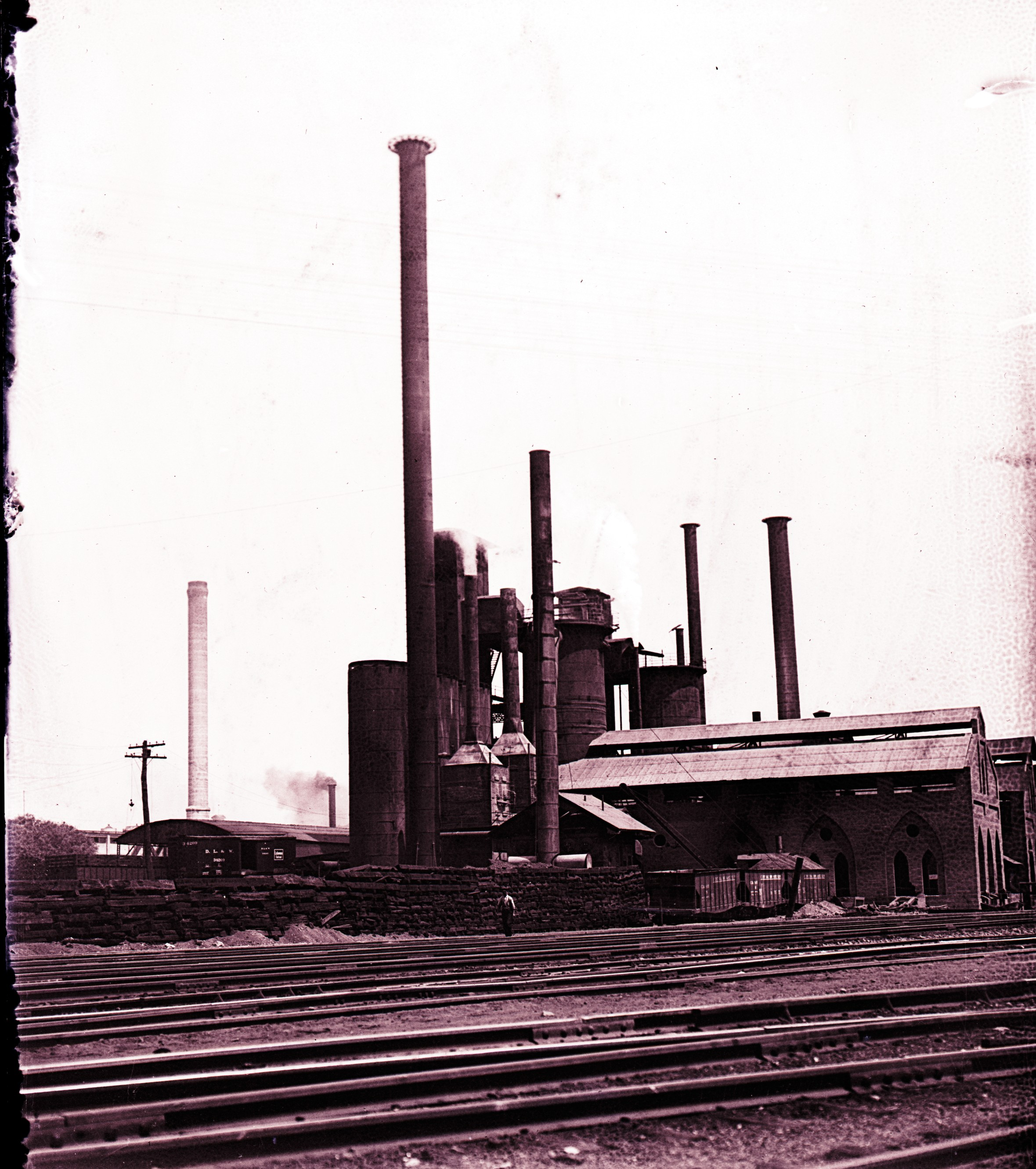
The Pennsylvania Steel Company mill in Steelton, PA, as seen in 1908.

After initial habitation by Susquehannock Indians and subsequent nearby Harrisburg establishment, the area was owned by the Kelker family of Harrisburg by the 1800s. The 100-acre area was chosen in 1866 by Samuel Morse Felton Sr., president of the Pennsylvania Steel Company, to begin construction of a steel mill. This particular site was favored because of the location's proximity to the Pennsylvania Railroad, the Pennsylvania Canal, and the nearby iron mine in Cornwall, Lebanon County. The land was purchased from owners Henry A. and Rudolph F. Kelker; then, steel pioneer Alexander Lyman Holley was chosen to build the mill along the Susquehanna River, which was completed by 1867 (along with a mansion for Felton), and began operation on May 15, 1868. Originally named "Baldwin" after Matthias W. Baldwin, founder of the Baldwin Locomotive Works, by 1871 it had changed to "Steel Works" after the existence of another Baldwin, Pennsylvania Post Office, and finally "Steelton" in 1879 after confusion of the Post Office with the steel mill itself. It was incorporated as a borough on January 19, 1880. The extensive steel works of the Pennsylvania Steel Company later became operated by Bethlehem Steel, ArcelorMittal, and currently Cleveland-Cliffs. Also present at one time were brickyards, a flouring mill, and machine shops.

19 people were killed and 199 injured, when a Baseball Special train from Harrisburg to Philadelphia derailed at Steelton on July 28, 1962. Three of the nine cars landed in the Susquehanna River. A passing U.S. Navy drill team participated in the rescue efforts.

== Geography ==
Steelton is located in southern Dauphin County along the northeast bank of the Susquehanna River. It is bordered to the southeast by the borough of Highspire and to the northeast by the unincorporated communities of Enhaut and Bressler. To the northwest, the city limits of Harrisburg, the state capital, come within 0.3 miles (0.48 km) of the borough limits of Steelton; the city center is 4 miles (6 km) northwest of Steelton's center.

According to the United States Census Bureau, the borough has a total area of 1.9 square miles (4.9 km^{2}), all land.

Pennsylvania Route 230 (Front Street) is the main road through the borough, connecting Harrisburg to the northwest with Highspire and Middletown to the southeast.

== Demographics ==
Historical population
Census	Pop.	Note	%±
1880	2,447		—
1890	9,250		278.0%
1900	12,086		30.7%
1910	14,246		17.9%
1920	13,428		−5.7%
1930	13,291		−1.0%
1940	13,115		−1.3%
1950	12,574		−4.1%
1960	11,266		−10.4%
1970	8,556		−24.1%
1980	6,484		−24.2%
1990	5,152		−20.5%
2000	5,858		13.7%
2010	5,990		2.3%
2020	6,263		4.6%
2021 (est.)	6,245	▼	−0.3%

=== Racial and ethnic composition ===
Steelton borough, Pennsylvania – Racial and ethnic composition Note: the US Census treats Hispanic/Latino as an ethnic category. This table excludes Latinos from the racial categories and assigns them to a separate category. Hispanics/Latinos may be of any race.
Race / Ethnicity (NH = Non-Hispanic)	Pop 2000	Pop 2010	Pop 2020	% 2000	% 2010	% 2020
White alone (NH)	3,393	2,593	2,183	57.92%	43.29%	34.86%
Black or African American alone (NH)	1,779	2,168	2,356	30.37%	36.19%	37.62%
Native American or Alaska Native alone (NH)	11	8	10	0.19%	0.13%	0.16%
Asian alone (NH)	38	43	43	0.65%	0.72%	0.69%
Native Hawaiian or Pacific Islander alone (NH)	2	0	6	0.03%	0.00%	0.10%
Other race alone (NH)	21	19	54	0.36%	0.32%	0.86%
Mixed race or Multiracial (NH)	176	283	474	3.00%	4.72%	7.57%
Hispanic or Latino (any race)	438	876	1,137	7.48%	14.62%	18.15%
Total	5,858	5,990	6,263	100.00%	100.00%	100.00%

=== 2020 census ===
As of the census of 2020, there were 6,263 people and 2,109 households residing in Steelton. The median household income was $47,556. The percentage of persons in poverty was 16.1%. The racial makeup of the borough was 44.0% White, 45.5% Black or African American, 0.2% Asian, and 8.3% from two or more races. Hispanic or Latino of any race were 17% of the population.

As of the census of 2010, there were 5,990 people. The racial makeup of the borough was 48.7% White, 38.1% Black or African American, 0.2% Native American, 0.7% Asian, 5.9% from other races, and 6.4% from two or more races. Hispanic or Latino of any race were 14.6% of the population.

As of the census of 2000, there were 5,858 people, 2,312 households, and 1,518 families residing in the borough. The population density was 3,215.6 inhabitants per square mile (1,241.6/km^{2}). There were 2,533 housing units at an average density of 1,390.4 units per square mile (536.8 units/km^{2}). The racial makeup of the borough was 62.03% White, 31.12% African American, 0.22% Native American, 0.65% Asian, 0.03% Pacific Islander, 2.41% from other races, and 3.53% from two or more races. Hispanic or Latino of any race were 7.48% of the population. 15.0% were of German, 7.7% American, 6.0% Irish, 5.7% Italian and 5.4% Croatian ancestry according to Census 2000.

According to Census 2000, there were 2,312 households, out of which 33.0% had children under the age of 18 living with them, 38.1% were married couples living together, 22.0% had a female householder with no husband present, and 34.3% were non-families. 29.7% of all households were made up of individuals, and 13.7% had someone living alone who was 65 years of age or older. The average household size was 2.53 and the average family size was 3.13.

In the borough the population was spread out, with 28.8% under the age of 18, 7.8% from 18 to 24, 27.5% from 25 to 44, 19.9% from 45 to 64, and 16.0% who were 65 years of age or older. The median age was 36 years. For every 100 females, there were 87.0 males. For every 100 females age 18 and over, there were 80.6 males.

The median income for a household in the borough was $34,829, and the median income for a family was $39,556. Males had a median income of $30,488 versus $24,701 for females. The per capita income for the borough was $16,612. About 9.1% of families and 11.8% of the population were below the poverty line, including 19.5% of those under age 18 and 3.1% of those age 65 or older.

== Culture ==
Front Street in Steelton has long been the town's social center, with shops, banks, churches, restaurants and bars.

In September 2017, the borough opened the first skatepark in Dauphin County, which was extended again in 2020 to a total of 28,000 square feet. Skate competitions are hosted there and it is a popular draw in the region.

The Steelton High School building was added to the National Register of Historic Places in 2011.

== Education ==
The Borough of Steelton is served by the Steelton-Highspire School District, which contains two schools: Steelton-Highspire Elementary School and Steelton-Highspire Junior/Senior High School.

== Notable people ==
- Bull Behman, former NFL player and coach
- Quincy Bent, vice president of Bethlehem Steel
- Marylouise Burke, actress
- Troy Drayton, former NFL and Penn State football player
- Orrin C. Evans, pioneering African-American journalist and comic book publisher
- Don Falcone, musician and producer
- Ottie Beatrice Graham, writer
- Jordan Hill, defensive tackle for Penn State and 2013 NFL draft to Seattle Seahawks
- Marne Intrieri, football offensive lineman
- Homer Litzenberg, lieutenant general
- Walter M. Mumma, congressman
- Allen Sangree, sports writer and war journalist
- Frank Sinkovitz, football center
- Dennis Stewart, basketball player
- John Yovicsin, football player and coach
- Bryce Carter, football player
