= Dauphin County, Pennsylvania =

County in the United States

- County
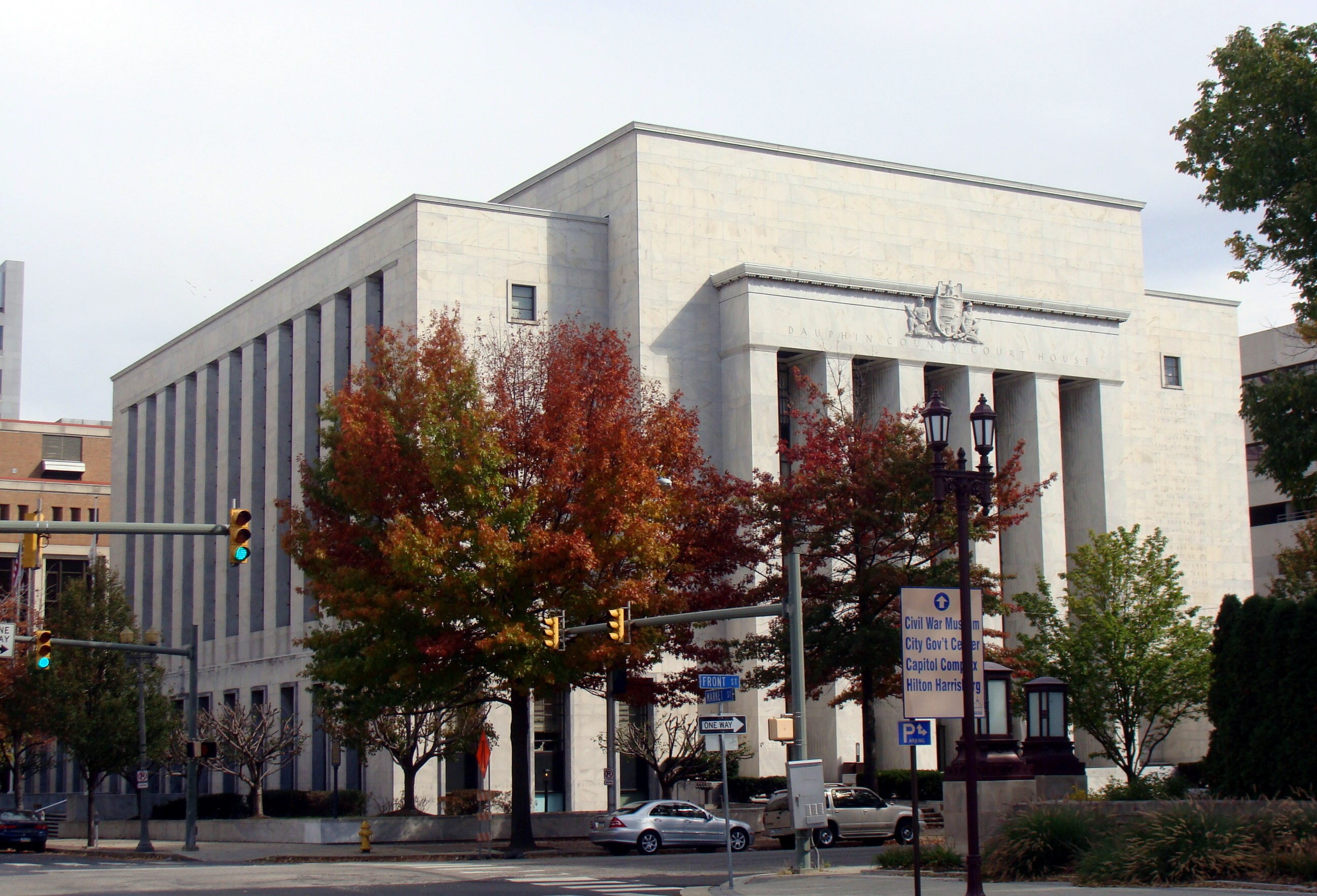
- Dauphin County Courthouse in Harrisburg

- Flag Seal Logo

- Location within the U.S. state of Pennsylvania
- Coordinates: 40°25′N 76°47′W
- Country: United States
- State: Pennsylvania
- Founded: March 4, 1785
- Named for: Louis Joseph, Dauphin of France
- Seat: Harrisburg
- Largest township: Lower Paxton Township

Area
  - Total: 558 sq mi (1,450 km^{2})
  - Land: 525 sq mi (1,360 km^{2})
  - Water: 33 sq mi (85 km^{2}) 5.9%

Population (2020)
  - Total: 286,401
  - Estimate (2025): 293,351 ▲
  - Density: 546/sq mi (211/km^{2})
- Time zone: UTC−5 (Eastern)
  - Summer (DST): UTC−4 (EDT)
- Area code: 717 and 223
- Congressional district: 10th
- Website: www.dauphincounty.gov

Pennsylvania Historical Marker
- Designated: December 9, 1982

Dauphin County (/ˈdɔːfɪn/) is a county in the Commonwealth of Pennsylvania. As of the 2020 census, the population was 286,401. The county seat is Harrisburg, Pennsylvania's state capital and ninth-most populous city. The county was created on March 4, 1785, from part of Lancaster County and was named after Louis Joseph, Dauphin of France, the first son of King Louis XVI. Dauphin County is included in the Harrisburg–Carlisle Metropolitan Statistical Area. Located within the county is Three Mile Island Nuclear Generating Station, site of the 1979 nuclear core meltdown. The nuclear power plant closed in 2019. The county is part of the South Central region of the commonwealth. (Note: Includes Lancaster, York, Berks, Dauphin, Cumberland, Franklin, Lebanon, Adams and Perry Counties)

== Geography ==
According to the U.S. Census Bureau, the county has a total area of 558 square miles (1,450 km^{2}), of which 525 square miles (1,360 km^{2}) is land and 33 square miles (85 km^{2}) (5.9%) is water. The county is bound to its western border by the Susquehanna River (with the exception of a small peninsula next to Duncannon). The area code is 717 with an overlay of 223.

=== Adjacent counties ===
- Northumberland County (north)
- Schuylkill County (northeast)
- Lebanon County (east)
- Lancaster County (south)
- York County (southwest)
- Cumberland County (west)
- Perry County (west)
- Juniata County (northwest)

=== Major roads and highways ===
- I-76 / Penna Turnpike
- I-81
- I-83
- I-283
- US 11 / US 15
- US 22
- US 209
- US 322
- US 422
- PA 25
- PA 39
- PA 147
- PA 225
- PA 230
- PA 283
- PA 325
- PA 341
- PA 441
- PA 443
- PA 743
- PA 849
- SR 3032

=== Climate ===
Most of the county by area has a humid continental climate (Dfa except for some Dfb in highlands.) The inclusion of temperature numbers for the past decade shows some lower-lying areas, including Harrisburg, to have a humid subtropical climate (Cfa.) The hardiness zone is 7a except in some higher northern areas where it is 6b and a few very small areas along the river below the city including the airport where it is 7b.

Climate data for Harrisburg, Pennsylvania (Harrisburg Int'l), 1991–2020 normals, (Note: Mean monthly maxima and minima (i.e. the highest and lowest temperature readings during an entire month or year) calculated based on data at said location from 1981 to 2010.) extremes 1888–present (Note: Official records for Harrisburg kept at downtown from July 1888 to December 1938, Capital City Airport from January 1939 to September 1991, and at Harrisburg Int'l in Middletown since October 1991.)
Month	Jan	Feb	Mar	Apr	May	Jun	Jul	Aug	Sep	Oct	Nov	Dec	Year
Record high °F (°C)	73 (23)	79 (26)	87 (31)	93 (34)	97 (36)	100 (38)	107 (42)	104 (40)	102 (39)	97 (36)	84 (29)	75 (24)	107 (42)
Mean maximum °F (°C)	59.3 (15.2)	61.4 (16.3)	72.7 (22.6)	83.5 (28.6)	89.5 (31.9)	93.3 (34.1)	96.2 (35.7)	93.8 (34.3)	89.7 (32.1)	81.1 (27.3)	70.8 (21.6)	62.3 (16.8)	97.0 (36.1)
Mean daily maximum °F (°C)	38.6 (3.7)	42.0 (5.6)	51.3 (10.7)	63.8 (17.7)	73.7 (23.2)	82.4 (28.0)	86.8 (30.4)	84.7 (29.3)	77.6 (25.3)	65.7 (18.7)	53.9 (12.2)	43.3 (6.3)	63.6 (17.6)
Daily mean °F (°C)	30.8 (−0.7)	33.4 (0.8)	41.8 (5.4)	53.2 (11.8)	63.4 (17.4)	72.5 (22.5)	77.3 (25.2)	75.2 (24.0)	67.9 (19.9)	55.8 (13.2)	44.8 (7.1)	35.8 (2.1)	54.3 (12.4)
Mean daily minimum °F (°C)	23.0 (−5.0)	24.7 (−4.1)	32.3 (0.2)	42.5 (5.8)	53.1 (11.7)	62.7 (17.1)	67.8 (19.9)	65.8 (18.8)	58.2 (14.6)	46.0 (7.8)	35.8 (2.1)	28.2 (−2.1)	45.0 (7.2)
Mean minimum °F (°C)	7.4 (−13.7)	10.1 (−12.2)	17.9 (−7.8)	29.2 (−1.6)	39.6 (4.2)	50.8 (10.4)	58.3 (14.6)	55.8 (13.2)	45.2 (7.3)	33.0 (0.6)	22.9 (−5.1)	14.6 (−9.7)	5.0 (−15.0)
Record low °F (°C)	−22 (−30)	−13 (−25)	−1 (−18)	11 (−12)	30 (−1)	40 (4)	49 (9)	45 (7)	30 (−1)	23 (−5)	10 (−12)	−8 (−22)	−22 (−30)
Average precipitation inches (mm)	3.03 (77)	2.59 (66)	3.70 (94)	3.55 (90)	3.83 (97)	3.98 (101)	4.74 (120)	3.77 (96)	4.83 (123)	3.81 (97)	2.97 (75)	3.43 (87)	44.23 (1,123)
Average snowfall inches (cm)	9.1 (23)	9.4 (24)	5.6 (14)	0.4 (1.0)	0.0 (0.0)	0.0 (0.0)	0.0 (0.0)	0.0 (0.0)	0.0 (0.0)	0.2 (0.51)	0.8 (2.0)	4.4 (11)	29.9 (76)
Average extreme snow depth inches (cm)	5.3 (13)	5.1 (13)	4.0 (10)	0.2 (0.51)	0.0 (0.0)	0.0 (0.0)	0.0 (0.0)	0.0 (0.0)	0.0 (0.0)	0.1 (0.25)	0.3 (0.76)	2.4 (6.1)	9.8 (25)
Average precipitation days (≥ 0.01 in)	10.9	10.4	11.0	11.4	13.0	11.5	10.9	10.0	9.2	9.2	8.5	10.3	126.3
Average snowy days (≥ 0.1 in)	5.1	4.8	2.7	0.3	0.0	0.0	0.0	0.0	0.0	0.0	0.7	2.7	16.3
Average ultraviolet index	2	3	4	6	8	9	9	8	6	4	2	2	5
Source 1: NOAA
Source 2: Weather Atlas (UV data)

Climate data for Harrisburg, Pennsylvania (Harrisburg Capital City Airport) 1991-2020 normals (Records 1939-2021)
Month	Jan	Feb	Mar	Apr	May	Jun	Jul	Aug	Sep	Oct	Nov	Dec	Year
Record high °F (°C)	73 (23)	83 (28)	86 (30)	93 (34)	97 (36)	100 (38)	107 (42)	101 (38)	102 (39)	97 (36)	84 (29)	75 (24)	107 (42)
Mean daily maximum °F (°C)	40.3 (4.6)	43.2 (6.2)	52.6 (11.4)	64.9 (18.3)	74.7 (23.7)	83.2 (28.4)	87.6 (30.9)	85.4 (29.7)	78.6 (25.9)	66.7 (19.3)	55.1 (12.8)	44.4 (6.9)	64.7 (18.2)
Daily mean °F (°C)	32.6 (0.3)	34.7 (1.5)	43.2 (6.2)	54.1 (12.3)	64.0 (17.8)	73.0 (22.8)	77.5 (25.3)	75.4 (24.1)	68.5 (20.3)	56.7 (13.7)	46.0 (7.8)	37.0 (2.8)	55.2 (12.9)
Mean daily minimum °F (°C)	24.9 (−3.9)	26.2 (−3.2)	33.9 (1.1)	43.3 (6.3)	53.2 (11.8)	62.8 (17.1)	67.4 (19.7)	65.5 (18.6)	58.4 (14.7)	46.7 (8.2)	37.0 (2.8)	29.5 (−1.4)	45.7 (7.6)
Record low °F (°C)	−9 (−23)	−5 (−21)	2 (−17)	19 (−7)	31 (−1)	40 (4)	49 (9)	45 (7)	30 (−1)	23 (−5)	13 (−11)	−8 (−22)	−9 (−23)
Average precipitation inches (mm)	2.64 (67)	2.36 (60)	3.35 (85)	3.70 (94)	3.48 (88)	3.72 (94)	4.30 (109)	3.68 (93)	4.12 (105)	3.68 (93)	2.80 (71)	3.15 (80)	40.98 (1,041)
Average precipitation days (≥ 0.01 in)	9	9	10	12	14	12	12	11	10	11	9	10	127
Source: NOAA

== Demographics ==
Historical population
Census	Pop.	Note	%±
1790	18,155		—
1800	22,270		22.7%
1810	31,883		43.2%
1820	21,653		−32.1%
1830	25,243		16.6%
1840	30,118		19.3%
1850	35,754		18.7%
1860	46,756		30.8%
1870	60,740		29.9%
1880	76,148		25.4%
1890	96,977		27.4%
1900	114,443		18.0%
1910	136,152		19.0%
1920	153,116		12.5%
1930	165,231		7.9%
1940	177,410		7.4%
1950	197,784		11.5%
1960	220,255		11.4%
1970	223,834		1.6%
1980	232,317		3.8%
1990	237,813		2.4%
2000	251,798		5.9%
2010	268,100		6.5%
2020	286,401		6.8%
2025 (est.)	293,351	▲	2.4%
U.S. Decennial Census; 1790-1960 1900-1990; 1990-2000 2010, 2020

=== Racial and ethnic composition ===
Dauphin County, Pennsylvania – Racial and ethnic composition Note: the US Census treats Hispanic/Latino as an ethnic category. This table excludes Latinos from the racial categories and assigns them to a separate category. Hispanics/Latinos may be of any race.
Race / Ethnicity (NH = Non-Hispanic)	Pop 1980	Pop 1990	Pop 2000	Pop 2010	Pop 2020	% 1980	% 1990	% 2000	% 2010	% 2020
White alone (NH)	195,519	193,697	190,347	187,402	175,175	84.16%	81.45%	75.60%	69.90%	61.16%
Black or African American alone (NH)	30,961	34,843	41,709	46,320	48,404	13.33%	14.65%	16.56%	17.28%	16.90%
Native American or Alaska Native alone (NH)	226	297	357	396	396	0.10%	0.12%	0.14%	0.15%	0.14%
Asian alone (NH)	1,391	2,683	4,906	8,507	17,183	0.60%	1.13%	1.95%	3.17%	6.00%
Native Hawaiian or Pacific Islander alone (NH)	x	x	61	44	88	x	x	0.02%	0.02%	0.03%
Other race alone (NH)	635	269	350	409	1,465	0.27%	0.11%	0.14%	0.15%	0.51%
Mixed race or Multiracial (NH)	x	x	3,664	6,227	12,439	x	x	1.46%	2.32%	4.34%
Hispanic or Latino (any race)	3,585	6,024	10,404	18,795	31,251	1.54%	2.53%	4.13%	7.01%	10.91%
Total	232,317	237,813	251,798	268,100	286,401	100.00%	100.00%	100.00%	100.00%	100.00%

=== 2020 census ===
As of the 2020 census, the county had a population of 286,401. The median age was 39.8 years. 21.6% of residents were under the age of 18 and 17.6% of residents were 65 years of age or older. For every 100 females there were 94.6 males, and for every 100 females age 18 and over there were 92.1 males age 18 and over.

The racial makeup of the county was 63.2% White, 17.8% Black or African American, 0.3% American Indian and Alaska Native, 6.0% Asian, <0.1% Native Hawaiian and Pacific Islander, 5.2% from some other race, and 7.5% from two or more races. Hispanic or Latino residents of any race comprised 10.9% of the population.

85.2% of residents lived in urban areas, while 14.8% lived in rural areas.

There were 116,761 households in the county, of which 27.9% had children under the age of 18 living in them. Of all households, 42.2% were married-couple households, 19.7% were households with a male householder and no spouse or partner present, and 30.5% were households with a female householder and no spouse or partner present. About 31.4% of all households were made up of individuals and 12.3% had someone living alone who was 65 years of age or older.

There were 126,514 housing units, of which 7.7% were vacant. Among occupied housing units, 61.1% were owner-occupied and 38.9% were renter-occupied. The homeowner vacancy rate was 1.4% and the rental vacancy rate was 7.2%.

=== 2010 census ===
As of the 2010 census, the county was 72.7% White, 18.0% Black or African American, 0.2% Native American, 3.2% Asian, and 3.1% were two or more races. 7.0% of the population were of Hispanic or Latino ancestry.

=== 2000 census ===
As of the 2000 census, there were 251,798 people, 102,670 households, and 66,119 families residing in the county. The population density was 479 inhabitants per square mile (185/km^{2}). There were 111,133 housing units at an average density of 212 units per square mile (82/km^{2}). The racial makeup of the county was 77.11% White, 16.91% Black or African American, 0.16% Native American, 1.96% Asian, 0.03% Pacific Islander, 1.97% from other races, and 1.85% from two or more races. 4.13% of the population were Hispanic or Latino of any race. 29.2% were of German, 7.5% Irish, 7.3% American and 7.2% Italian ancestry. 91.8% spoke English and 3.9% Spanish as their first language.

In 2000 there were 102,670 households, out of which 29.70% had children under the age of 18 living with them, 47.60% were married couples living together, 12.90% had a female householder with no husband present, and 35.60% were non-families. 30.00% of all households were made up of individuals, and 10.30% had someone living alone who was 65 years of age or older. The average household size was 2.39 and the average family size was 2.98.

In the county, the population was spread out, with 24.30% under the age of 18, 7.60% from 18 to 24, 30.10% from 25 to 44, 23.80% from 45 to 64, and 14.20% who were 65 years of age or older. The median age was 38 years. For every 100 females, there were 92.30 males. For every 100 females age 18 and over, there were 88.80 males.

A study by Echelon Insights found Dauphin County to be the most typical county in America, with its 2016 presidential vote, median income, higher education rate, and religiosity all very close to the national averages.

=== Amish community ===
Dauphin County is home to an Amish community that resides in the Lykens Valley in the northern part of the county, consisting of eight church districts. The community was settled by Amish from Lancaster County seeking cheaper land.

== Metropolitan statistical area ==
The United States Office of Management and Budget has designated Dauphin County as the Harrisburg-Carlisle, PA Metropolitan Statistical Area (MSA). As of the 2020 U.S. census the metropolitan area ranked fifth-most populous in the State of Pennsylvania and the 95th-most populous in the United States with a population of 591,712. Dauphin County is also a part of the larger Harrisburg–York–Lebanon combined statistical area (CSA), which combines the populations of Dauphin County as well as Adams, Cumberland, Lebanon, Perry and York Counties in Pennsylvania. The combined statistical area ranked the 5th most populous in Pennsylvania and 43rd most populous in the nation with a population of 1,219,422.

== Politics and government ==
Results of the 2024 United States presidential election in Dauphin County Harris: 80–90%; 70–80%; 60–70%; 50–60%; 40–50%; Trump: 80–90%; 70–80%; 60–70%; 50–60%; 40–50%

Results in Dauphin County of the 1971 Pennsylvania referendum to prohibit sex discrimination Yes: 70–80%; 60–70%; 50–60%; No: 60–70%; 50–60%; Other: Tie

Results in Dauphin County of the 2021 Pennsylvania referendum to prohibit racial and ethnic discrimination Yes: 90–100%; 80–90%; 70–80%; 60–70%; 50–60%; No: 50–60%

United States presidential election results for Dauphin County, Pennsylvania
Year	Republican		Democratic		Third party(ies)	
Year	No.	%	No.	%	No.	%
1880	8,573	55.21%	6,619	42.62%	337	2.17%
1884	9,394	58.46%	6,378	39.69%	298	1.85%
1888	10,852	57.66%	7,684	40.82%	286	1.52%
1892	11,010	57.47%	7,520	39.25%	627	3.27%
1896	14,752	66.84%	6,584	29.83%	733	3.32%
1900	14,673	64.23%	7,390	32.35%	783	3.43%
1904	16,508	72.61%	5,040	22.17%	1,186	5.22%
1908	15,637	63.38%	7,546	30.59%	1,488	6.03%
1912	6,012	23.29%	7,470	28.93%	12,337	47.78%
1916	13,954	52.16%	11,483	42.92%	1,315	4.92%
1920	26,094	65.36%	11,990	30.03%	1,839	4.61%
1924	27,838	68.04%	9,004	22.01%	4,074	9.96%
1928	49,108	83.78%	9,115	15.55%	394	0.67%
1932	36,278	60.31%	22,412	37.26%	1,462	2.43%
1936	39,598	47.42%	43,256	51.80%	644	0.77%
1940	42,394	52.35%	38,305	47.30%	282	0.35%
1944	44,725	59.05%	30,684	40.51%	333	0.44%
1948	46,861	62.16%	27,729	36.78%	796	1.06%
1952	58,385	65.12%	30,985	34.56%	286	0.32%
1956	61,342	67.45%	29,226	32.14%	375	0.41%
1960	61,726	64.22%	33,962	35.33%	427	0.44%
1964	42,718	47.77%	46,119	51.57%	594	0.66%
1968	48,394	59.17%	25,480	31.15%	7,914	9.68%
1972	54,307	69.38%	22,587	28.86%	1,376	1.76%
1976	46,819	56.33%	34,342	41.32%	1,961	2.36%
1980	44,039	56.18%	27,252	34.77%	7,096	9.05%
1984	54,330	61.28%	33,576	37.87%	752	0.85%
1988	48,917	57.77%	35,079	41.43%	681	0.80%
1992	45,479	45.98%	36,990	37.40%	16,441	16.62%
1996	44,417	47.78%	40,936	44.03%	7,618	8.19%
2000	53,631	53.28%	44,390	44.10%	2,637	2.62%
2004	65,296	53.87%	55,299	45.62%	613	0.51%
2008	58,238	44.85%	69,975	53.89%	1,632	1.26%
2012	57,450	46.22%	64,965	52.26%	1,886	1.52%
2016	60,863	46.18%	64,706	49.10%	6,214	4.72%
2020	66,408	44.90%	78,983	53.40%	2,510	1.70%
2024	69,474	46.29%	78,327	52.19%	2,280	1.52%

United States Senate election results for Dauphin County, Pennsylvania1
Year	Republican		Democratic		Third party(ies)	
Year	No.	%	No.	%	No.	%
1994	42,187	55.08%	31,226	40.77%	3,183	4.16%
2000	54,986	56.10%	40,047	40.86%	2,976	3.04%
2006	40,832	46.69%	46,622	53.31%	0	0.00%
2012	53,649	44.48%	65,235	54.09%	1,726	1.43%
2018	47,152	43.37%	59,533	54.76%	2,023	1.86%
2024	66,949	44.95%	77,022	51.71%	4,985	3.35%

United States Senate election results for Dauphin County, Pennsylvania3
Year	Republican		Democratic		Third party(ies)	
Year	No.	%	No.	%	No.	%
1992	54,399	56.08%	37,178	38.32%	5,433	5.60%
1998	41,397	68.00%	17,209	28.27%	2,273	3.73%
2004	68,174	58.30%	40,077	34.27%	8,684	7.43%
2010	49,021	55.75%	38,913	44.25%	0	0.00%
2016	63,740	49.54%	62,551	48.61%	2,383	1.85%
2022	50,141	43.81%	61,599	53.82%	2,706	2.36%

Pennsylvania Gubernatorial election results for Dauphin County
Year	Republican		Democratic		Third party(ies)	
Year	No.	%	No.	%	No.	%
1970	35,515	53.88%	27,021	41.00%	3,374	5.12%
1974	30,337	48.21%	31,885	50.67%	705	1.12%
1978	42,546	65.75%	21,426	33.11%	732	1.13%
1982	32,796	46.11%	37,538	52.77%	799	1.12%
1986	37,641	55.96%	29,116	43.29%	502	0.75%
1990	16,833	28.10%	43,063	71.90%	0	0.00%
1994	34,689	44.63%	27,844	35.82%	15,201	19.56%
1998	39,914	64.79%	13,203	21.43%	8,486	13.78%
2002	44,231	55.45%	33,537	42.05%	1,996	2.50%
2006	47,294	54.36%	39,711	45.64%	0	0.00%
2010	53,261	60.47%	34,813	39.53%	0	0.00%
2014	39,111	49.20%	40,376	50.80%	0	0.00%
2018	42,436	39.09%	64,045	59.00%	2,068	1.91%
2022	43,580	38.10%	68,585	59.95%	2,233	1.95%

Dauphin County was historically a Republican stronghold, like most of south-central Pennsylvania. It was long one of the more conservative urban counties in the nation, having only supported a Democrat for president twice from 1880 to 2004. The only breaks in this trend were in 1936 and 1964, which were national 400-electoral vote Democratic landslides.

However, there has been a decided shift toward the Democrats in national and statewide elections in recent years. This culminated when the Democrats overtook the Republicans in countywide registration during the summer of 2008.

Bob Casey Jr. carried the county in the 2006 Senate election when he unseated Rick Santorum. According to the Dauphin County Board of Elections, in 2008 Barack Obama became the first Democratic presidential candidate to carry Dauphin County since 1964, receiving 9.0% more of the vote than John McCain. It was also only the third time Dauphin County had supported a Democrat for president since 1936. Obama won Dauphin with a slightly reduced majority in 2012, while Hillary Clinton won it with a narrow plurality in 2016. It is now the only blue county in the traditionally powerfully Republican Susquehanna Valley.

=== Voter registration ===
As of July 29, 2024, 44.0% of registered voters in the county were Democrats, 38.6% Republicans, 13.3% non-affiliated, and 4.1% other party.

Chart of Voter Registration
1. Democratic (44.0%)
2. Republican (38.6%)
3. Independent (13.3%)
4. Other Parties (4.07%)

Party registration stats according to the Secretary of State's office:

Voter Registration and Party Enrollment
Party	Number of Voters	Percentage
Democratic	86,237	43.98%
Republican	75,704	38.61%
Independent	26,129	13.33%
Third parties	7,986	4.07%
Total	196,056	100%

=== County commissioners ===
- Justin Douglas, Chairman, Democrat
- Mike Pries, Vice Chairman, Republican
- George P. Hartwick III, Secretary, Democrat

=== Other county offices ===
- Clerk of Courts, Tina Nixon, Democrat
- Controller, Mary Bateman, Republican
- Coroner, Graham Hetrick, Republican
- District Attorney, Fran Chardo, Republican
- Prothonotary, Antonio Carreno, Democrat
- Recorder of Deeds, Jim Zugay, Republican
- Register of Wills and Clerk of the Orphans' Court, Jean Marfizo King, Republican
- Sheriff, Nick Chimienti, Republican
- Treasurer, Nick DiFrancesco, Republican
- Solicitor, Fred Lighty, Esquire

=== State representatives ===
- Nathan Davidson, Democrat, 103rd district
- Dave Madsen, Democrat, 104th district
- Justin Fleming, Democrat, 105th district
- Tom Mehaffie, Republican, 106th district
- Joseph Kerwin, Republican, 125th district

=== State senate ===
- Patty Kim, Democrat, 15th district
- Greg Rothman, Republican, 34th district

=== United States House of Representatives ===
- Scott Perry, Republican, 10th district

=== United States Senate ===
Senator	Party
Dave McCormick	Republican
John Fetterman	Democrat

== Education ==
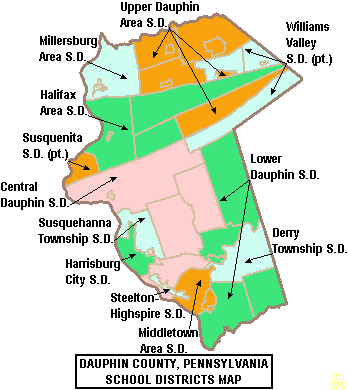
Map of Dauphin County, Pennsylvania School Districts

=== Colleges and universities ===
- Dixon University Center
- Harrisburg Area Community College
- Harrisburg University of Science and Technology
- Penn State Harrisburg
- Penn State Hershey Medical Center
- Temple University Harrisburg Campus
- Widener University School of Law

=== Public school districts ===
School districts include:

- Central Dauphin School District
- Derry Township School District
- Halifax Area School District
- Harrisburg School District (Pennsylvania)
- Lower Dauphin School District
- Middletown Area School District
- Millersburg School District
- Steelton-Highspire School District
- Susquehanna Township School District
- Susquenita School District (also in Perry County)
- Upper Dauphin School District
- Williams Valley School District (also in Schuylkill County)

=== Public charter schools ===
Several public charter schools are established in Dauphin County

- Infinity Charter School
- Sylvan Heights Science Charter School
- Capital Area School for the Arts
- Premier Arts and Science Charter School

=== Intermediate unit ===
The Capital Area Intermediate Unit 15 is a state approved education agency that offers: school districts, charter schools, private schools, and home school students, a variety of services including: a completely developed K–12 curriculum that is mapped and aligned with the Pennsylvania Academic Standards (available online), shared services, a group purchasing program and a wide variety of special education and special needs services.

=== Library system ===
The Dauphin County Library System provides library service to the residents of the county through a main central library in the state capital and county seat of Harrisburg, Pennsylvania and eight branch libraries. DCLS is a private, non-profit corporation. It is governed by a 17-member Board of Trustees, five appointed annually by the Dauphin County Commissioners, and twelve elected for three-year terms. The Library is a member of the Pennsylvania library system.

=== Private schools ===
As reported by the National Center for Educational Statistics

- Armstrong Valley Christian School – Halifax
- Berrysburg Christian Academy – Elizabethvile
- Bishop McDevitt High School – Harrisburg
- Cathedral Consolidated School – Harrisburg
- Covenant Christian Academy – Harrisburg
- East Shore Montessori School – Harrisburg
- Emmanuel Wesleyan Academy – Gratz
- Garden Spot Amish School – Millersburg
- Garden Spot School – Millersburg
- Goddard School – Harrisburg
- Hansel and Gretel Early Learning Centers – Harrisburg
- Harrisburg Adventist School – Harrisburg
- Harrisburg Christian School – Harrisburg
- Hillside Amish School – Harrisville
- Hillside Seventh Day Adventist School – Harrisburg
- Keystone Math and Science Academy – Harrisburg
- Kinder-Care Learning Center – Harrisburg
- KinderCare Learning Center – Hershey
- Londonderry School – Harrisburg
- Mahantango School – Lykens
- Matterstown School – Millersburg
- Middletown Christian School – Middletown
- Milton Hershey School – Hershey
- North Mountain View Amish – Millersburg
- Northern Dauphin Christian School – Millersburg
- Pride of the Neighborhood Academies – Harrisburg
- Rakers Mill School – Elizabethville
- Rolling Acres School – Lykens
- Seven Sorrows of BMV School – Middletown
- Sonshine Learning Station – Middletown
- South Mountain View School – Spring Glen
- Specktown School – Lykens
- St. Catherine Laboure School – Harrisburg
- St Joan of Arc Elementary School – Hershey
- St. Margaret Mary School – Harrisburg
- St. Stephen's Episcopal School – Harrisburg
- Tender Years Inc. – Hershey
- The Nativity School of Harrisburg – Harrisburg
- Windy Knoll School – Spring Glen
- Wordsworth Academy – Harrisbrug
- Yeshiva Academy – Harrisburg

== Economy ==
The largest employers in Dauphin County in 2019 were:

- Commonwealth Government
- Milton S. Hershey Medical Center
- The Hershey Company
- Hershey Entertainment & Resorts Co.
- UPMC Pinnacle Hospitals
- Federal Government
- Pennsylvania State University
- PHEAA – Pennsylvania Higher Education Assistance Agency
- United Parcel Service Inc
- TYCO Electronics Corp.

== Recreation ==
There are two Pennsylvania state parks in Dauphin County.

- Boyd Big Tree Preserve Conservation Area
- Joseph E. Ibberson Conservation Area

== Communities ==
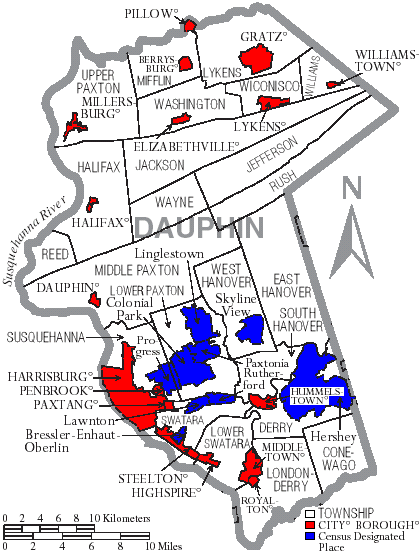
Map of Dauphin County, Pennsylvania with municipal labels showing cities and boroughs (red), townships (white), and census-designated places (blue).

Under Pennsylvania law, there are four types of incorporated municipalities: cities, boroughs, townships, and, in at most two cases, towns. The following cities, boroughs and townships are located in Dauphin County:

=== City ===
- Harrisburg (county seat)

=== Boroughs ===
- Berrysburg
- Dauphin
- Elizabethville
- Gratz
- Halifax
- Highspire
- Hummelstown
- Lykens
- Middletown
- Millersburg
- Paxtang
- Penbrook
- Pillow
- Royalton
- Steelton
- Williamstown

=== Townships ===
- Conewago
- Derry
- East Hanover
- Halifax
- Jackson
- Jefferson
- Londonderry
- Lower Paxton
- Lower Swatara
- Lykens
- Middle Paxton
- Mifflin
- Reed
- Rush
- South Hanover
- Susquehanna
- Swatara
- Upper Paxton
- Washington
- Wayne
- West Hanover
- Wiconisco
- Williams

=== Census-designated places ===
Census-designated places are geographical areas designated by the U.S. Census Bureau for the purposes of compiling demographic data. They are not actual jurisdictions under Pennsylvania law. Other unincorporated communities, such as villages, may be listed here as well.

- Bressler
- Colonial Park
- Enhaut
- Hershey
- Lawnton
- Lenkerville
- Linglestown
- Oberlin
- Palmdale
- Paxtonia
- Progress
- Rutherford
- Skyline View
- Union Deposit
- Wiconisco

=== Unincorporated communities ===
- Big Run
- Bachmanville
- Carsonville
- Cartin
- Chambers Hill
- Clifton
- Dayton
- Deodate
- Dietrich
- Ebenezer
- Edgemont
- Ellendale Forge
- Enders
- Enterline
- Erdman
- Estherton
- Fort Hunter
- Freys Grove
- Grantville
- Greenfield
- Hanoverdale
- Heckton
- Hockersville
- Hoernerstown
- Inglenook
- Jednota
- Killinger
- Loyalton
- Lucknow
- Manada Gap
- Manada Hill
- Matamoras
- Matterstown
- Montrose Park
- Oakleigh
- Oakmont
- Oberlin Gardens
- Paxtang Manor
- Paxton
- Piketown
- Powells Valley
- Rife
- Rockville
- Sand Beach
- Shellsville
- Singersville
- Speeceville
- Stone Glen
- Swatara
- Vaughn
- Waltonville
- Waynesville

=== Population ranking ===
The population ranking of the following table is based on the 2010 census of Dauphin County.

† county seat

Rank	City/Town/etc.	Municipal type	Population (2010 Census)
1	† Harrisburg (State Capital)	City	49,528
2	Hershey	CDP	14,257
3	Colonial Park	CDP	13,229
4	Progress	CDP	9,765
5	Middletown	Borough	8,901
6	Linglestown	CDP	6,334
7	Steelton	Borough	5,990
8	Paxtonia	CDP	5,412
9	Hummelstown	Borough	4,538
10	Rutherford	CDP	4,303
11	Skyline View	CDP	4,003
12	Lawnton	CDP	3,813
13	Penbrook	Borough	3,008
14	Millersburg	Borough	2,557
15	Highspire	Borough	2,399
16	Lykens	Borough	1,799
17	Paxtang	Borough	1,561
18	Elizabethville	Borough	1,510
19	Bressler	CDP	1,437
20	Williamstown	Borough	1,387
21	Palmdale	CDP	1,308
22	Enhaut	CDP	1,007
23	Wiconsico	CDP	921
24	Royalton	Borough	907
25	Halifax	Borough	841
26	Dauphin	Borough	791
27	Gratz	Borough	765
28	Oberlin	CDP	588
29	Lenkerville	CDP	550
30	Union Deposit	CDP	407
31	Berrysburg	Borough	368
32	Pillow	Borough	298

== Notable people ==
- Milton S. Hershey (1857–1945), founder of The Hershey Company and the town of Hershey
- H.B. Reese (1879–1956), inventor of Reese's Peanut Butter Cups
- Samuel B. Garver (1839–1911), an Illinois state representative, businessman, and farmer, was born in Dauphin County.
- Nicholas H. Heck (1882–1953), a geophysicist, seismologist, oceanographer, hydrographic surveyor, and United States Coast and Geodetic Survey officer, was born in Dauphin County in Heckton Mills, near Heckton.
- Newt Gingrich (1943–), former speaker of the United States House of Representatives, was born in Harrisburg and lived in Hummelstown.
- Michelle Wolf (1985–), comedian, was born and lived in Dauphin County.
- Christian Pulisic (1998–), soccer player who plays for Chelsea F.C. of England's Premier League and the United States men's national team was born in Hershey.
- Micah Parsons (1999–), football linebacker.
- Richard L. Schlegel (1927–2006), LGBT rights activist; born in Berrysburg and lived in Harrisburg.

== See also ==
- Hummelstown brownstone
- National Register of Historic Places listings in Dauphin County, Pennsylvania
