= List of state routes in Dauphin County, Pennsylvania =

This is a list of state routes in Dauphin County, Pennsylvania. State Routes in Pennsylvania are maintained by the Pennsylvania Department of Transportation. This list incorporates routes numbered between 0001 and 4999 which are either Traffic Routes (Interstate, US, or PA Routes numbered 0001 through 0999) or Quadrant Routes (State Routes numbered 1001 through 4999). For any PA Routes which were relocated after the incorporation of the Location Referencing System in 1987, the old routes were given numbers starting with 6 while the last three digits were the old route number. None exist in Dauphin County.

As is the case with the other counties in the state, the route numbers start in the northeast quadrant and go clockwise from the 1000s to the 4000s. Odd numbered roads travel south to north, with numbering starting in the north and west of the quadrant. Even numbered roads travel west to east, with numbering starting in the south and west.

The quadrant dividers are not explicitly delineated.

== Traffic routes ==
Interstate Highways in Dauphin County
Route	Length		Notes
Route	MI	KM	Notes
I-76 | Penna Turnpike			PA Turnpike does not have SR number.
I-81	16.993	27.348	
I-83	8.682	13.972	
I-283	2.906	4.677	

U.S. Routes in Dauphin County
Route	Length		Notes
Route	MI	KM	Notes
US 11	.973	1.566	
US 15	.973	1.566	Concurrency with US 11 throughout county
US 22	30.064	48.383	
US 209	20.978	33.761	
US 322	11.896	19.145	Concurrency with Interstate 83, Interstate 81, US 22 from Dauphin County border to Eisenhower Interchange.
US 422	4.802	7.728	

Pennsylvania Routes in Dauphin County
Route	Length		Notes
Route	MI	KM	Notes
PA 25	18.115	29.153	
PA 39	17.829	28.693	
PA 147	20.162	32.448	
PA 225	24.230	38.994	
PA 230	15.370	24.736	
PA 283	10.921	17.576	Unsigned as PA 300 to avoid conflict with Interstate 283.
PA 325	27.591	44.403	
PA 341	7.152	11.510	
PA 441	13.925	22.410	
PA 441 Truck	0.500	0.805	Signed truck route on Ann Street in Middletown.
PA 443	15.556	25.035	
PA 743	14.354	23.101	
PA 849	.217	0.349	

== Quadrant routes ==
=== 1000s ===
Route	Length	South or western terminus	North or eastern terminus	Notes
SR 1001		SR 4025 (Lebanon County) Gold Mine Road at the Lebanon County line	SR3016 (Schuylkill County) Gold Mine Road at the Schuylkill County line	
SR 1002		US 209 at the Washington-Wiconisco Township line	SR 4010 (Schuylkill County) at the Schuylkill County line	
SR 1003		SR 4013 Powells Valley Road in Wayne Township	PA 225 in Jackson Township	
SR 1004		SR 4001 Rutter Road, Creek Drive in Jackson Township	SR 1003 Mountain House Road in Jackson Township	
SR 1005		US 209 in Jackson Township	SR 1002 Market Street in Williamstown	
SR 1006		PA 225 in Washington Township	US 209 in Washington Township	
SR 1007		US 209, Mountain View Terrace in Washington Township	PA 25 in Mifflin Township	
SR 1008		PA 225 in Mifflin Township	SR 1009 Crossroads Road, SR 1016 Middle Road in Lykens Township	
SR 1009		US 209, Oakdale Station Road in Loyalton	SR 4002 Luxemburg Road in Lykens Township	
SR 1010		SR 1007 Wilhour Road, Kolva Road in Loyalton	PA 225 in Washington Township	
SR 1011		SR 1013 Center Street in Gratz	SR 4022 Luxemburg Road in Lykens Township	
SR 1013		PA 25 Market Street, Center Street in Gratz	SR 4022 Luxemburg Road in Erdman	
SR 1014		SR 1009 Crossroads Road in Lykens Township	PA 25 Market Street in Gratz	
SR 1015		PA 25 in Lykens Township	SR 1013 Erdman Road in Lykens Township	
SR 1016		SR 1008 Phillips Road, QR 1009 Crossroads Road in Lykens Township	SR 1013 Erdman Road in Lykens Township	
SR 1017		PA 25 in Lykens Township	T-883 at the Schuylkill County line	
SR 1018		SR 4022 Luxemburg Road in Lykens Township	SR 1016 Middle Road in Lykens Township	
SR 1019		Lykens Street, Shippen Dam Road in Mifflin Township	PA 225 in Mifflin Township	
SR 1020		SR 1016 Middle Road in Lykens Township	PA 25 at the Gratz borough line	
SR 1021		US 209 Main Street, Church Street in Elizabethville	SR 1007 Wilhour Road in Washington Township	
SR 1022		SR 1009 Crossroads Road in Lykens Township	SR 1016 Middle Road in Lykens Township	
SR 1023		SR 4001 Enders Road in Wayne Township	SR 1003 Mountain House Road / Carsonville Road in Jackson Township	
SR 1024		SR 4002 Erdman Road in Erdman	Fearnot Road at the Schuylkill County line	
SR 1026		PA 225 Market Street / Chestnut Street in Pillow	SR 3018 (Northumberland County) at the Northumberland County line	

=== 2000s ===
Route	Length	South or western terminus	North or eastern terminus	Notes
SR 2001		Hillsdale Road at the Lancaster County line	Shippen Street at the Royalton borough line	
SR 2002		SR 2003 Middletown Road, School House Road in Londonderry Township	PA 341 Colebrook Road, Miller Road in Londonderry Township	
SR 2003		PA 230 Main Street, Vine Street in Middletown	SR 2021 Hanover Street, QR 2018 Main Street in Hummelstown	
SR 2004		SR 3002 Fulling Mill Road in Derry Township	SR 2003 Middletown Road in Derry Township	
SR 2005		PA 341 Round Top Road / Colebrook Road in Londonderry Township	SR 2018 Main Street, Quarry Road in Hummelstown	
SR 2006		SR 2003 Middletown Road in Derry Township	SR 2005 Waltonville Road, Wood Road in Hummelstown	
SR 2007		Zeager Road at the Lancaster County line	PA 341 in Deodate	
SR 2008		SR 2009 Bellaire Road in Conewago Township	SR 3009 (Lebanon County) Maple Dale Road at the Lebanon County line	
SR 2009		SR 4037 (Lancaster County) Bellaire Road at the Lancaster County line	PA 341 in Conewago Township	
SR 2010		SR 2019 Nyes Road in Lower Paxton Township	SR 2015 Sand Beach Road in Sand Beach	
SR 2011		SR 3011 Stouffer Road at the Lebanon County line	PA 39 Hersheypark Drive in Hershey	
SR 2012		PA 743 Hersheypark Drive	US 422 Chocolate Avenue, Baum Street in Palmdale	
SR 2013		PA 743 Hershey Road, Schoolhouse Road in Conewago Township	SR 3013 (Lebanon County) Bachmanville Road at the Lebanon County line	
SR 2014		PA 743 Laudermilch Road in Derry Township	SR 4008 (Lebanon County) Ridge Road at the Lebanon County line	
SR 2015		PA 743 Hersheypark Drive / Park Avenue, QR 2016 Hersheypark Drive in Hershey	PA 443 Mountain Road in East Hanover Township	
SR 2016		PA 39 Hersheypark Drive / Hershey Road, Park Boulevard in Hershey	PA 743 Hersheypark Drive / Swatara Road in Hershey	
SR 2017		Jonestown Road in East Hanover Township	PA 443 Mountain Road in Manada Gap	
SR 2018		US 322 Paxton Street in Swatara Township	US 422 Chocolate Avenue / Benjamin Franklin Highway in Hershey	
SR 2019		Grayson Road in Swatara Township	Old Jonestown Road in Lower Paxton Township	
SR 2021		SR 2003 Hanover Street / Hoernerstown Road in South Hanover Township	SR 2010 Union Deposit Road, Grandview Road in South Hanover Township	
SR 2022		SR 2015 Sand Beach Road in South Hanover Township	PA 743 Laudermilch Road in East Hanover Township	
SR 2023		PA 230 Harrisburg Pike in Londonderry Township	PA 341 Colebrook Road in Londonderry Township	
SR 2024		SR 2003 Hoernerstown Road, Red Top Road in South Hanover Township	PA 39 Hershey Road in West Hanover Township	
SR 2025		US 22 Allentown Road, PA 743 Laudermilch Road in Grantville	Jonestown Road in Grantville	
SR 2026		SR 2003 Oak Grove Road in West Hanover Township	PA 39 Hershey Road in West Hanover Township	
SR 2027		Piketown Road at the Lower Paxton-West Hanover Township line	PA 39 Linglestown Road, Piketown Road, Pleasant Hill Road in Lower Paxton Township	
SR 2029	—	Lochwillow Avenue overpass over I-81 in Lower Paxton Township		
SR 2030		SR 3019 Mountain Road in Lower Paxton Township	Blue Ridge Avenue at the Lower Paxton-West Hanover Township line	
SR 2031	—	Blue Ribbon Avenue overpass over I-81 in Lower Paxton Township		
SR 2033	—	Fairville Avenue overpass over I-81 in West Hanover Township		
SR 2035	—	Iron Creek Road overpass over I-81 in East Hanover Township		
SR 2037	—	Firehouse Road overpass over I-81 in East Hanover Township		
SR 2039	—	Fiddlers Elbow Road overpass over US 322 in Derry Township		
SR 2040	—	Rosedale Avenue overpass over QR 3032 Airport Connector in Lower Swatara Township		
SR 2041	—	Union Street overpass over PA 283 in Lower Swatara Township		
SR 2042	—	Spring Garden Drive overpass over QR 3032 Airport Connector in Lower Swatara Township		
SR 2043	—	Foxanna Road overpass over PA 283 in Lower Swatara Township		
SR 2044	—	Hagy Lane overpass over US 22 / US 322 in Middle Paxton Township		

=== 3000s ===
Route	Length	From	Via	To	Notes
3001		PA 230 2nd Street in Highspire	Eisenhower Boulevard	I-83 / US 322 Capital Beltway in Swatara Township	Brief concurrency with PA 441
3002		QR 3001 Eisenhower Boulevard in Lower Swatara Township	Fulling Mill Road	QR 2004 Creek Road in Derry Township	Eastern terminus at western terminus of QR 2004
3003		PA 230 Front Street in Steelton	Chambers Street, Center Street, Main Street, Hanshue Street, Pieffers Lane, Chambers Hill Road, 40th Street	QR 3010 Eastbound Paxton Street in Swatara Township	Brief concurrency with QR 3006
3004		PA 230 Front Street in Steelton	Mohn Street, Highland Street	PA 441 Highland Street / Harrisburg Street in Oberlin	
3005		QR 3010 Westbound Paxton Street in Swatara Township	40th Street	QR 3012 Derry Street in Oakleigh	
3006		PA 230 Front Street in Swatara Township	Pine Street, Orchard Drive, Chambers Hill Road	US 322 Paxton Street in Swatara Township	
3007		QR 3012 Derry Street, 19th Street, Berryhill Street in Harrisburg	19th Street, Harrisburg Street	Harrisburg Street, Pine Street in Steelton	
3008		PA 230 Front Street at the Steelton borough line	Gibson Street	QR 3007 19th Street / Harrisburg Street in Swatara Township	
3009		PA 230 Cameron Street, QR 3010 Paxton Street in Harrisburg	Paxton Street, Front Street (southbound only)	US 22 / US 322 in Heckton	Unofficially 2nd street as northbound, southern terminus opposite western terminus of QR 3010
3010		PA 230 Cameron Street, QR 3009 Paxton Street in Harrisburg	Paxton Street,	QR 3001 Eisenhower Boulevard in Swatara Township	Near Eisenhower Interchange
3011	13th Street overpass over I-83 Capital Beltway in Harrisburg				13th Street Interchange (Exit 44A)
3012		QR 3012 (Cumberland County) Market Street Bridge at the Cumberland County line	Market Street Bridge, Market Street, 4th Street, Mulberry Street, Derry Street	QR 3017 61st Street, Derry Street in Swatara Township	Missing segment on Market Street, eastern terminus at southern terminus of QR 3017
3013		QR 3010 Paxton Street in Swatara Township	29th Street, Rudy Road, 25th Street, 28th Street	QR 3014 Walnut Street, 28th Street in Penbrook	
3014		QR 3012 4th Street, Market Street in Swatara Township	Walnut Street, Fisher Plaza, State Street, Walnut Street	US 22 Walnut Street / Herr Street at the Penbrook borough line	
3015		QR 3012 Derry Street, Paxtang Avenue in Paxtang	Paxtang Avenue, Progress Avenue, North Progress Avenue	PA 39 Linglestown Road, North Progress Avenue in Susquehanna Township	
3016		QR 3016 (Cumberland County) M. Harvey Taylor Bridge at the Cumberland County line	M. Harvey Taylor Bridge, Forster Street, Fisher Plaza	QR 3014 Fisher Plaza / Walnut Street in Harrisburg	
3017		QR 3012 Derry Street in Swatara Township	61st Street, Page Road, Newside Road, Rutherford Road	QR 3024 Locust Lane, Rutherford Avenue in Colonial Park	
3018		QR 3016 Fisher Plaza / Forster Street in Harrisburg	7th Street, Herr Street	US 22 Herr Street / Arsenal Boulevard at the Harrisburg city line	
3019		US 22 Allentown Boulevard, Mountain Road in Paxtonia	Mountain Road	PA 39 Linglestown Road, Mountain Road in Linglestown	
3020		US 22 Herr Street, Clover Street in Susquehanna Township	Canby Street, Union Deposit Road	QR 2019 Nyes Road in Lower Paxton Township	
3021	Crooked Hill Road overpass over I-81 / US 322 Capital Beltway in Susquehanna Township				
3022	2 separate bridges on Maclay Street in Harrisburg				
3023		QR 3013 25th Street, Market Street at the Harrisburg city line	Market Street	QR 3020 Union Deposit Road, Canby Street at the Penbrook borough line	
3024		US 22 Walnut Street in Progress	Locust Lane	QR 3019 Nyes Road in Lower Paxton Township	
3025		QR 3010 Paxton Street in Susquehanna Township	32nd Street	I-83, Wayne Street in Susquehanna Township	Exit 45 (Onramp is QR 8023)
3026		US 22 Cameron Street in Harrisburg	Elmerton Avenue	QR 3017 Colonial Road in Susquehanna Township	
3027		PA 441 Oberlin Road in Harrisburg	Keckler Road	QR 3006 Chambers Hill Road in Swatara Township	
3028		PA 230 Cameron Street in Harrisburg	Westbound ramp of State Street, 13th Street	QR 3014 State Street, 13th Street in Swatara Township	
3030		QR 3006 Chambers Hill Road in Swatara Township	Penhar Drive	Grayson Drive in Swatara Township	
3031		QR 3016 Forster Street in Harrisburg	Commonwealth Avenue	Boas Street, 6th Street in Swatara Township	
3032		Harrisburg International Airport	Airport Connector	PA 283 in Swatara Township	
3036		PA 225 Peters Mountain Road in Middle Paxton Township	Old 22/322	Old 22/322, T-301 in Middle Paxton Township	

=== 4000s ===
Route	Length	South or western terminus	North or eastern terminus	Notes
SR 4001		SR 4013 Powells Valley Road in Enterline	PA 225 Fishervile Road	
SR 4002		PA 147 Market Street at the Millersburg borough line	Main Street at the Schuylkill County line	
SR 4003		US 209 in Upper Paxton Township	PA 25 Berrysburg Road, Phillips Road in Upper Paxton Township	
SR 4004		PA 225 in Halifax Township	SR 1003 Mountain House Road in Jackson Township	
SR 4005		PA 25 Berrysburg Road in Killinger	SR 4002 Shippen Dam Road in Upper Paxton Township	
SR 4006		PA 147 in Halifax Township	SR 4001 / SR 4004 Enders Road / Rutter Road in Enders	
SR 4007		Schoolhouse Lane in Lenkerville	PA 147 in Lenkerville	
SR 4008		PA 25 Berrysburg Road in Upper Paxton Township	SR 1017 Matterstown Road / Wilhour Road in Lenkerville	
SR 4009		SR 4007 Market Street in Lenkerville	US 209 State Street in Upper Paxton Township	
SR 4010		PA 25 Berrysburg Road, QR 4003 Klinger Road in Upper Paxton Township	SR 4002 Shippen Dam Road, Deibler Gap Road in Upper Paxton Township	
SR 4013		PA 147 / PA 225 Peters Mountain Road in Halifax Township	US 209 Main Street, Market Street in Lykens	
SR 4014		PA 147 Brubaker Road at the Halifax-Reed Township line	PA 225 Peters Mountain Road in Powells Valley	
