= Halifax Area School District =

School district in Pennsylvania, U.S.

Coordinates: 40.46370°N 76.93232°W

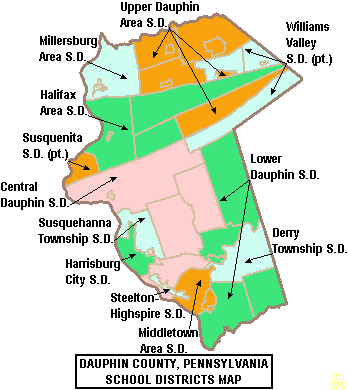
- Location of Halifax Area School District in Dauphin County, Pennsylvania

Location
- 3940 Peters Mountain Halifax, Pennsylvania 17032 Dauphin County; United States

District information
- Type: Public school district
- Grades: Preschool to 12

Students and staff
- District mascot: The Wildcats
- Colors: Black and Vegas gold

Other information
- Website: www.hasd.us

The Halifax Area School District is a small, suburban, public school district located in Halifax, Pennsylvania in Dauphin County. The district served 1,143 students in preschool to grade 12 in 2012. Halifax Area School District encompasses approximately 83 square miles (210 km^{2}). The district serves residents of: Halifax Borough, Halifax Township, Jackson Township and Wayne Township. According to 2000 federal census data, Halifax Area School District served a resident population of 7,366 people. By 2010, the district's population increased to 7,606 people.

According to the Pennsylvania Budget and Policy Center, 30.8% of the district's pupils lived at 185% or below the Federal Poverty Level as shown by their eligibility for the federal free or reduced price school meal programs in 2012. In 2009, the district residents’ per capita income was $19,609, while the median family income was $50,256. In Dauphin County, the median household income was $54,066. In the Commonwealth, the median family income was $49,501 and the United States median family income was $49,445, in 2010. By 2013, the median household income in the United States rose to $52,100. In 2014, the median household income in the USA was $53,700.

== Schools ==
- Enders-Fisherville Elementary School (grades Preschool, kindergarten, first)
- Halifax Area Elementary School (grades 2–5)
- Halifax Area Middle School (grades 6–8)
- Halifax Area High School (grades 9–12)

High school students may choose to attend Dauphin County Technical School for training in the construction and mechanical trades. School aged residents may attend the Capital Area School for the Arts which is an arts charter school located in Harrisburg, Pennsylvania. Students may also choose to attend Capital Area Online Learning Association (CAOLA) online education programs. The service is operated by the Capital Area Intermediate Unit 15. Halifax Area School District is served by the Capital Area Intermediate Unit 15 which offers a variety of services, including a completely developed K-12 curriculum that is mapped and aligned with the Pennsylvania Academic Standards (available online), shared services, a group purchasing program and a wide variety of special education and special needs services.

== Extracurriculars ==
Halifax Area School District offers a wide variety of clubs, activities and a sports program.

=== Sports ===
The district funds:

Boys

- Baseball - AA
- Basketball- AA
- Football - A
- Soccer - A
- Swimming & Diving - AA (Co-Op with Millersburg and Upper Dauphin School Districts)
- Wrestling - AA

Girls

- Basketball - AA
- Cheer - AAAA
- Soccer (Fall) - A
- Softball - A
- Swimming & Diving - AA (Co-Op with Millersburg and Upper Dauphin School Districts)
- Volleyball - A

All of Halifax’s sports are combined with Northern Dauphin Christian School.

Junior High School Sports

Boys

- Basketball
- Wrestling

Girls

- Basketball

According to PIAA directory July 2015
