= Halifax Area High School =

Coordinates: 40.462°N 76.929°W

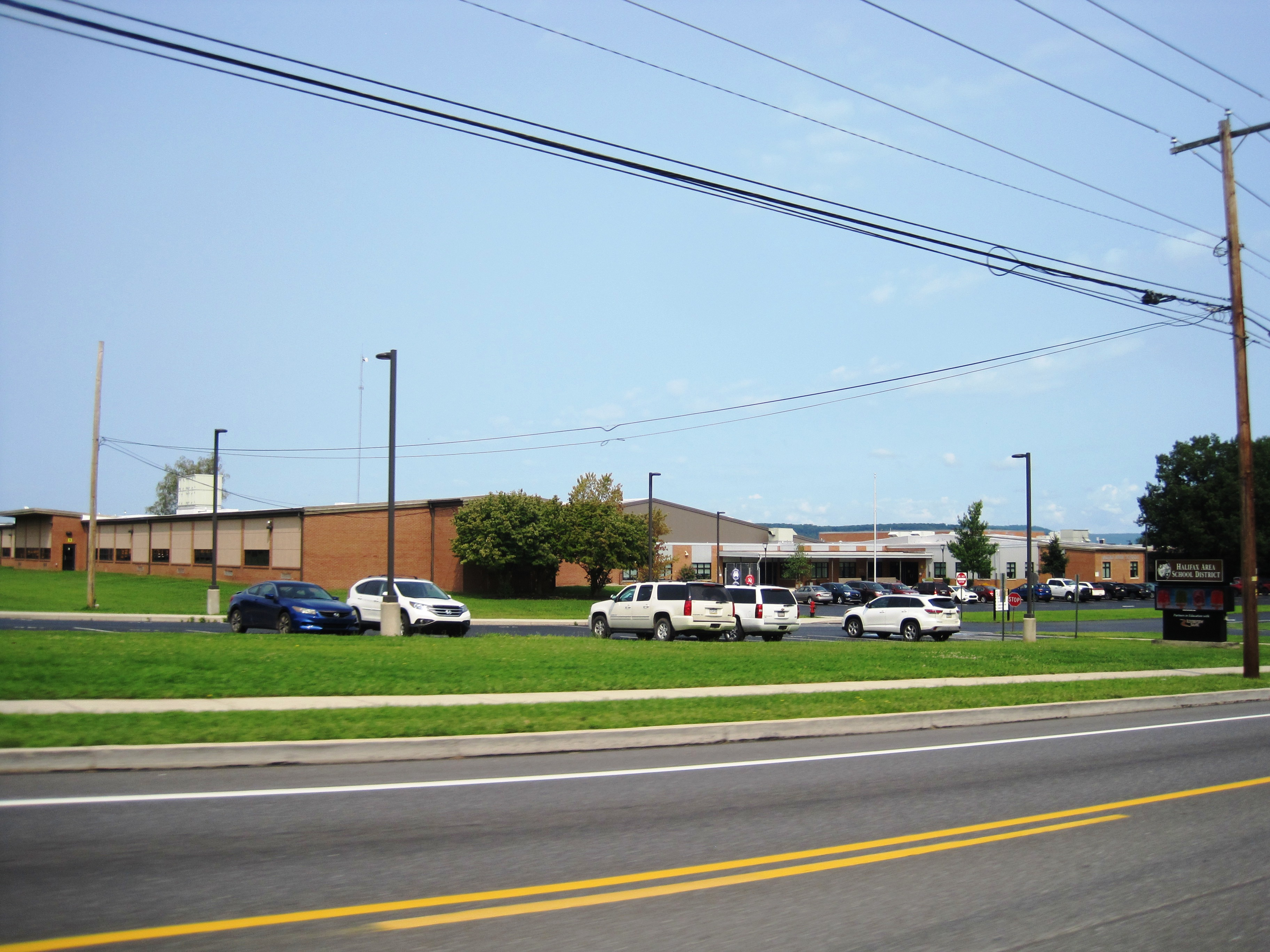
- 3940 Peters Mountain Road; Halifax, Pennsylvania 17032; Dauphin County; United States

Information
- Type: Public
- School district: Halifax Area School District
- Principal: David Hatfield
- Faculty: 24.00 (on FTE basis)
- Grades: 9 to 12
- Enrollment: 247 (2023–2024)
- Student to teacher ratio: 10.29
- Colors: Black and Gold
- Athletics conference: PIAA District 3
- Mascot: Wildcat
- Feeder schools: Halifax Area Middle School
- Website: Halifax Area High School

Halifax Area High School is a suburban, public secondary school located at 3940 Peters Mountain Road, Halifax, Halifax Township, Dauphin County, Pennsylvania. It was built in 1958. It is the sole high school operated by the Halifax Area School District. As of the 2017–2018 school year, enrollment was 295 pupils in 9th through 12th grades.

== Extracurriculars ==
Halifax Area High School offers a wide variety of clubs, activities and an extensive sports program.

=== Sports ===
The District funds:

Boys

- Baseball - A
- Basketball- A
- Football - A
- Soccer - A
- Wrestling - AA

Girls

- Basketball - AA
- Cheer - AAAA
- Soccer (Fall) - A
- Softball - A
- Volleyball - A

According to PIAA directory July 2014
