= Bridge in Reed Township =

- U.S. National Register of Historic Places
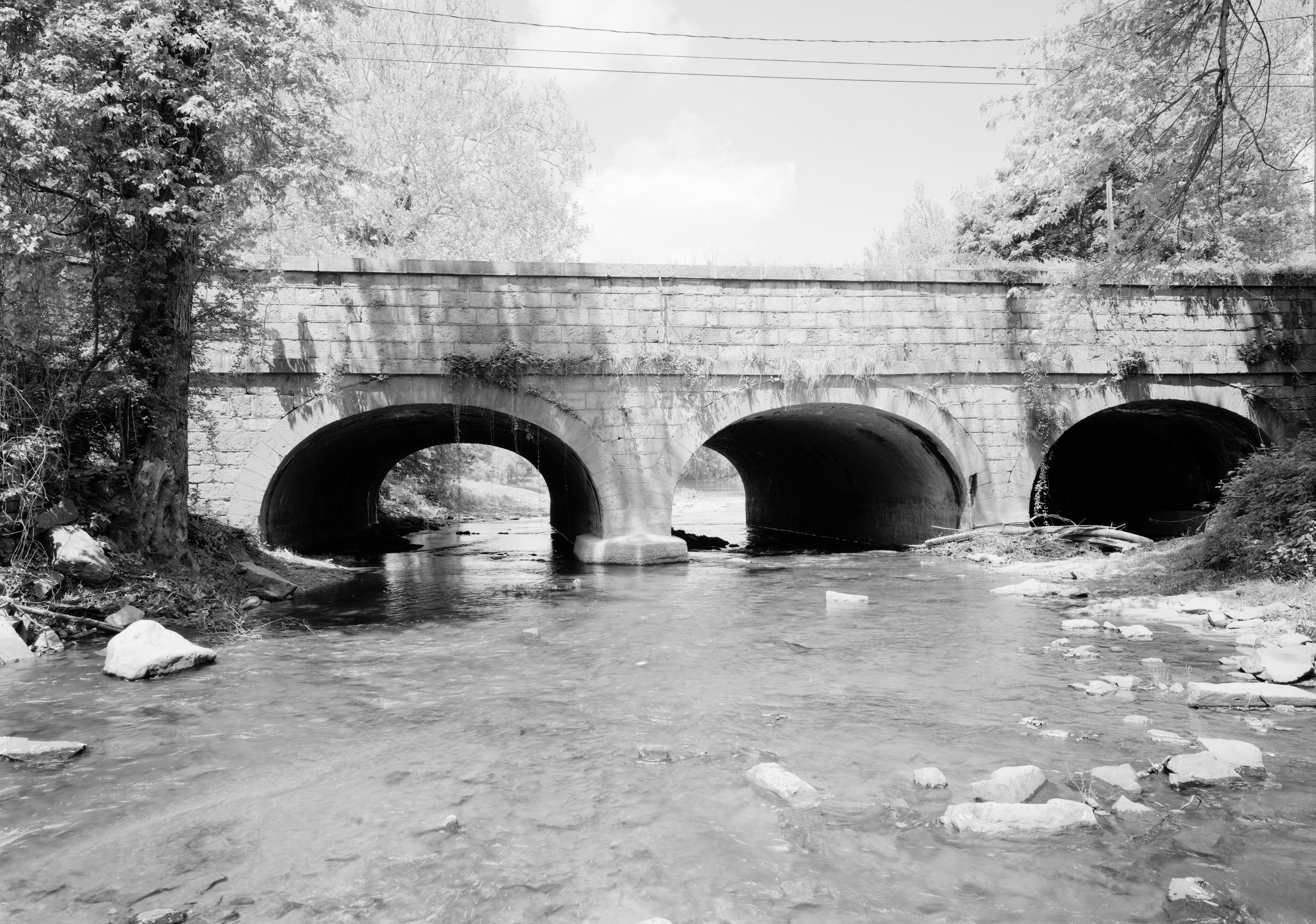
- Bridge in Reed Township, Summer 1999

- Location within Pennsylvania Location within the United States
- Location: Legislative Route 1 (State Route 147) over Powell Creek, Reed Township, Dauphin County, Pennsylvania
- Coordinates: 40°24′35″N 76°59′3″W
- Area: less than one acre
- Built: 1840
- Built by: Pennsylvania Canal Co.
- Architectural style: Multi-span stone arch
- MPS: Highway Bridges Owned by the Commonwealth of Pennsylvania, Department of Transportation TR
- NRHP reference No.: 88000823
- Added to NRHP: June 22, 1988

Bridge in Reed Township, originally known as Wiconisco Canal Aqueduct No. 3, is a historic multi-span stone arch bridge spanning Powell Creek on State Route 147 (River Road) in Reed Township, Dauphin County, Pennsylvania, United States. It was built in 1840, as an aqueduct. The property measures 72 feet (22 m) long by 50 feet (15 m) wide. It is built of red and white coursed ashlar and features a belt course and continuous parapet cap.

It was added to the National Register of Historic Places in 1988.

== See also ==
- List of bridges documented by the Historic American Engineering Record in Pennsylvania
