= Fisherville, Pennsylvania =

Fisherville is the name of several places in the U.S. state of Pennsylvania, including:

- Fisherville, Blair County, Pennsylvania
- Fisherville, Dauphin County, Pennsylvania
