= Reed Township, Pennsylvania =

Township in Pennsylvania, US

Coordinates: 40°25′00″N 77°00′59″W

- Township
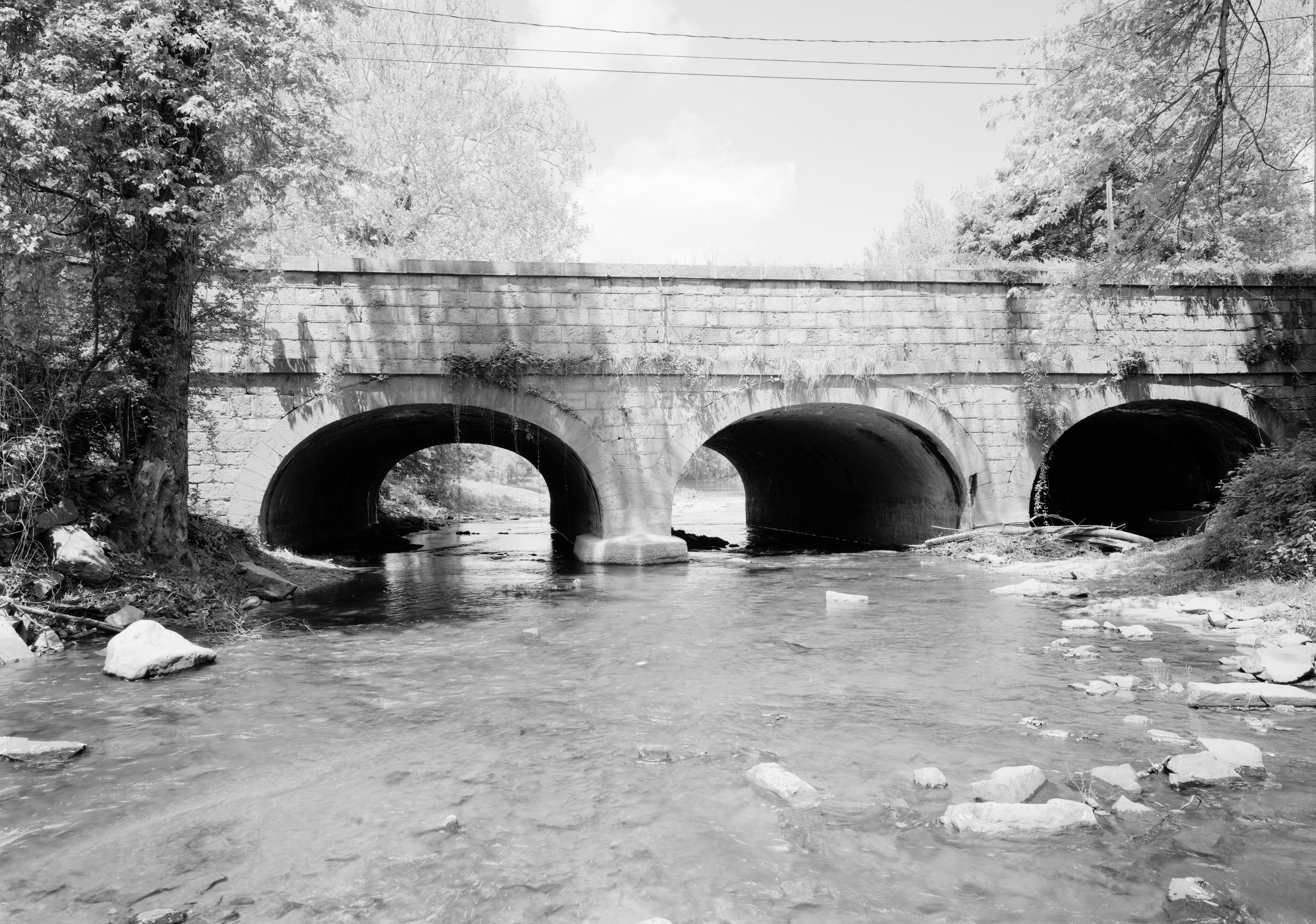
- Former canal aqueduct over Powell Creek

- Location in Dauphin County and state of Pennsylvania
- Country: United States
- State: Pennsylvania
- County: Dauphin
- Incorporated: 1849

Area
  - Total: 8.57 sq mi (22.20 km^{2})
  - Land: 5.93 sq mi (15.37 km^{2})
  - Water: 2.64 sq mi (6.83 km^{2})

Population (2020)
  - Total: 231 ▼
  - Estimate (2023): 229
  - Density: 40.3/sq mi (15.55/km^{2})
- Time zone: UTC-5 (Eastern (EST))
  - Summer (DST): UTC-4 (EDT)
- Area code: 717
- FIPS code: 42-043-63928
- Website: www.reedtownship.com

Reed Township is a township in Dauphin County, Pennsylvania, United States. The population was 231 at the 2020 census, a decline from 239 in 2010.

== History ==
Reed Township was named for William Reed, an early settler.

In May 1745, missionary David Brainerd traveled to Duncan Island to preach to the Native Americans who lived there.

The Legislative Route 1 Sycamore Allee and Bridge in Reed Township are listed on the National Register of Historic Places.

== Geography ==
Reed Township is in western Dauphin County, bordered by Middle Paxton Township to the south, Halifax Township to the east and northeast, and Perry County to the north and west. The township spans the Susquehanna River, and contains the only part of Dauphin County on the west shore of the Susquehanna River. This area is known as The Island (shown on topographic maps as "Duncan Island"), but it has become a peninsula due to changes in the river's course. The area is bounded by U.S. Routes 11/15, the Juniata River, the Susquehanna, and the old canal. The borough of Duncannon is to the west, across the Juniata River.

According to the United States Census Bureau, the township has a total area of 8.6 square miles (22.2 km^{2}), of which 5.9 square miles (15.3 km^{2}) is land and 2.7 square miles (6.9 km^{2}), or 30.90%, is water.

== Demographics ==
Historical population
Census	Pop.	Note	%±
2010	239		—
2020	231		−3.3%
2023 (est.)	229		−0.9%
U.S. Decennial Census

As of the census of 2000, there were 182 people, 74 households, and 52 families residing in the township. The population density was 30.6 inhabitants per square mile (11.8/km^{2}). There were 79 housing units at an average density of 13.3/sq mi (5.1/km^{2}). The racial makeup of the township was 95.60% White, 0.55% African American, 0.55% Asian, 1.65% from other races, and 1.65% from two or more races. Hispanic or Latino of any race were 1.65% of the population.

There were 74 households, out of which 33.8% had children under the age of 18 living with them, 58.1% were married couples living together, 9.5% had a female householder with no husband present, and 28.4% were non-families. 27.0% of all households were made up of individuals, and 9.5% had someone living alone who was 65 years of age or older. The average household size was 2.46 and the average family size was 2.94.

In the township the population was spread out, with 22.0% under the age of 18, 6.6% from 18 to 24, 31.9% from 25 to 44, 27.5% from 45 to 64, and 12.1% who were 65 years of age or older. The median age was 41 years. For every 100 females, there were 116.7 males. For every 100 females age 18 and over, there were 108.8 males.

The median income for a household in the township was $38,750, and the median income for a family was $46,250. Males had a median income of $38,750 versus $26,250 for females. The per capita income for the township was $22,839. About 10.5% of families and 11.4% of the population were below the poverty line, including 9.3% of those under the age of eighteen and 7.1% of those sixty five or over.

== School district ==
Children living in Reed Township are serviced by the Susquenita School District, which is in neighboring Perry County.
