= Wiconisco Canal =

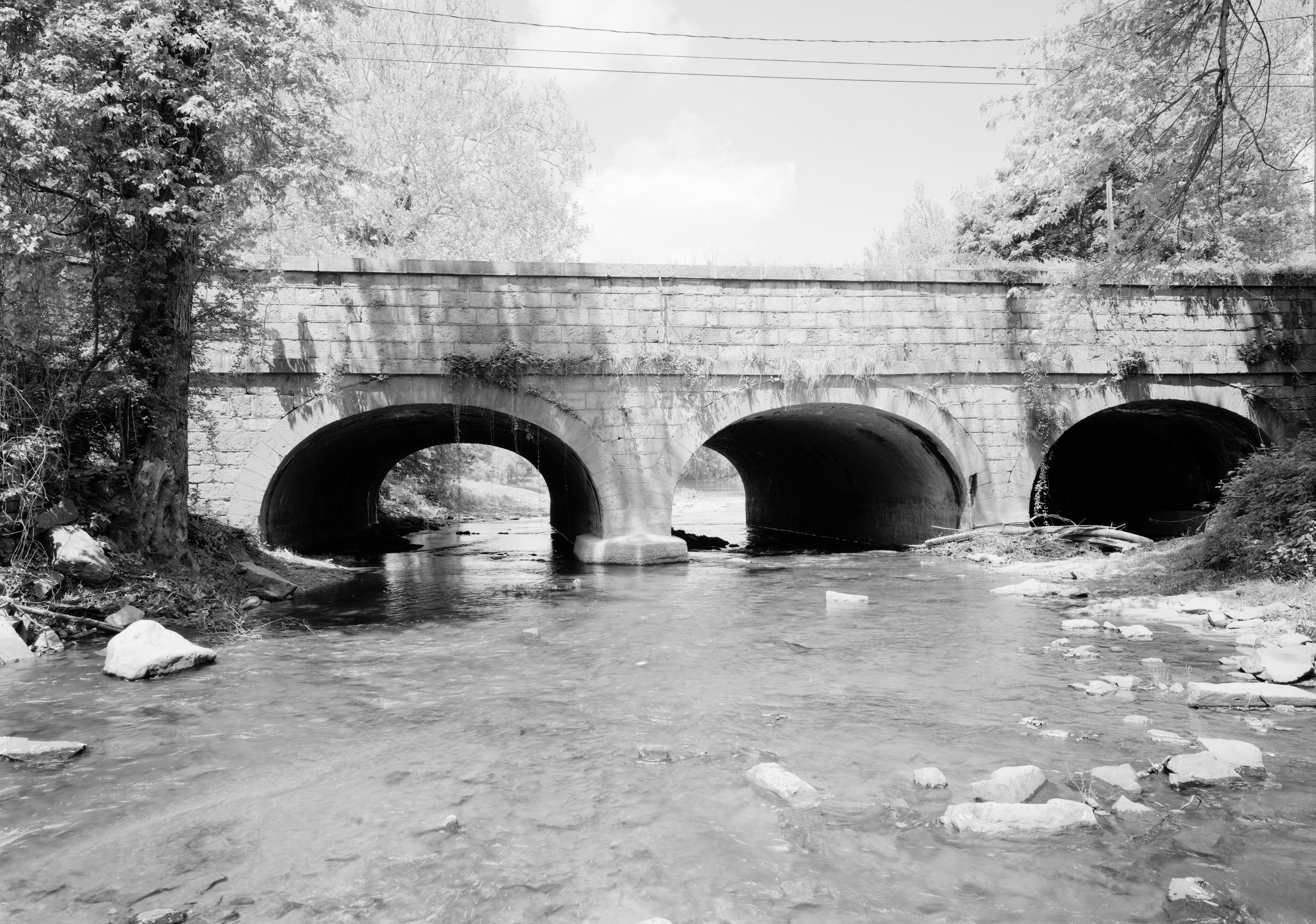
- Aqueduct No. 3 over Powell Creek

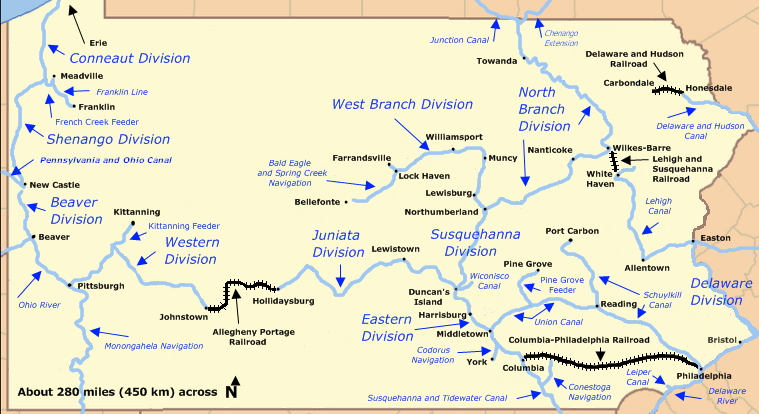
- Map of historic Pennsylvania canals

Location
- Country: United States
- State: Pennsylvania

Physical characteristics
- Source: Wiconisco Creek
  - location: Millersburg, Dauphin County
  - coordinates: 40°32′10″N 76°57′56″W (Note: These are the Geographic Names Information System (GNIS) coordinates for the mouth of Wiconisco Creek, near the north end of the former canal.)
  - elevation: 381 ft (116 m)
- Mouth: Susquehanna River
  - location: Opposite the mouth of the Juniata River, Dauphin County
  - coordinates: 40°24′03″N 77°00′49″W (Note: These are the Geographic Names Information System (GNIS) coordinates for the mouth of the Juniata River at Duncan's Island.)
  - elevation: 335 ft (102 m)
- Length: 12 mi (19 km)

Basin features
- River system: Pennsylvania Canal
- Original owner: Commonwealth of Pennsylvania

The Wiconisco Canal was a 19th century transportation waterway, about 12 miles (19 km) long, in Dauphin County in the U.S. state of Pennsylvania. Running along the east bank of the Susquehanna River between Millersburg and Duncan's Island at the mouth of the Juniata River, the canal overcame about 42 feet (13 m) of vertical lift through the use of 7 locks. (Note: The total is derived by adding the lift distances of the individual locks. These appear in a table on p. 108 of Shank's book.)

Started by the Commonwealth of Pennsylvania, the canal was completed in 1845 by a private firm and used to ship coal and other goods from northern Dauphin County to distant markets. Sold to a subsidiary of the Pennsylvania Railroad, it continued operating until largely destroyed by a flood in 1889. The canal's biggest aqueduct, No. 3 near Halifax, continues to serve as a highway bridge over Powell Creek. It was added to the National Register of Historic Places in 1988, as the Bridge in Reed Township.

== History ==
The state began construction of the canal in 1837 or 1838. Originally built as an extension of the Eastern Division of the Pennsylvania Canal, the canal was designed by Samuel Krauss, engineer of the Eastern Division. Plans called for a dam at Clarks Ferry to provide water deep enough for canal boats to cross the Susquehanna River parallel to Clarks Ferry Bridge and to enter or exit either canal.

After the Eastern Division canal was completed, John P. Rutherford, who had managed the final stages of the Eastern Division work near Harrisburg, was named construction superintendent for the Wiconisco project. In 1839, Simon Sallade, who replaced Rutherford as superintendent, divided the canal into 25 planning sections to keep track of cost estimates, construction bids, and details about the work. Structures such as locks were bid separately from work on the canal itself and included a feeder dam on Wiconisco Creek at Millersburg and three aqueducts. Aqueduct No. 3, which carried the canal over Powell Creek and was the largest of the three aqueducts, was completed in 1840.

After 1841, the state discontinued work on the canal because of lack of funds. Because of currency depreciation related to the panics of 1837 and 1839, Pennsylvania defaulted on its debts, including money owed for canal work. In 1842, the state legislature incorporated a private firm, the Wiconisco Canal Company, to take over the canal. This company completed the canal and began using it in 1845. Under the management of Edward Gratz, the majority stockholder, the canal operated profitably through the 1850s and 1860s by shipping 60 to 170 short tons (54 to 154 t) of anthracite coal annually from mines in the nearby Lykens Valley. Other cargoes included timber, farm products, furniture, and building materials, which could reach markets such as Philadelphia via other branches of the Pennsylvania Canal and connecting canals. In 1871, the Wiconisco Canal's miscellaneous cargo included 677.5 short tons (614.6 t) of railroad iron, "likely sowing the seeds of its own eventual demise".

Costly repairs and years of marginal returns led the canal company to sell its assets to the Pennsylvania Canal Company, a subsidiary of the Pennsylvania Railroad, in 1871. Because shipping coal by boat was cheaper than shipping it by rail, the canal continued to operate until a flood destroyed much of it in 1889. It was closed entirely in 1890 and never re-opened.

It is likely that Aqueduct No. 3, near Halifax, continued to carry land traffic over Powell Creek in the 1890s after the canal was destroyed. Because the passage between Peters Mountain to the east and the Susquehanna to the west is narrow, north- and southbound traffic had no other way to cross the creek. A state road map in 1928 showed Legislative Route No. 1 crossing the creek on the aqueduct. Renamed Pennsylvania Route 147, the road continues to use the aqueduct as a bridge. The structure, referred to as "Bridge in Reed Township", was added to the National Register of Historic Places in 1988.

== Points of interest ==
Feature	Coordinates	Description
Millersburg	40°32′22″N 76°57′39″W	Town at the northern terminus
Aqueduct No. 3	40°24′35″N 76°59′03″W	Largest aqueduct on canal
Duncan's Island	40°25′02″N 77°00′33″W	Island at the southern terminus

== See also ==
- List of canals in the United States

== Notes and references ==
Notes
