= Loyalton (disambiguation) =

Loyalton may refer to:

- Loyalton, California, a city in Sierra County
- Loyalton, Pennsylvania, an unincorporated community in Dauphin County
- Loyalton, South Dakota, an unincorporated community in Edmunds County
