= HASD =

HASD may refer to:

- Halifax Area School District
- Hazleton Area School District
- Hempfield Area School District
- Hortonville Area School District
- Huntingdon Area School District
