= Jefferson Township, Dauphin County, Pennsylvania =

Township in Pennsylvania, US

Coordinates: 40°31′00″N 76°45′59″W

- Township
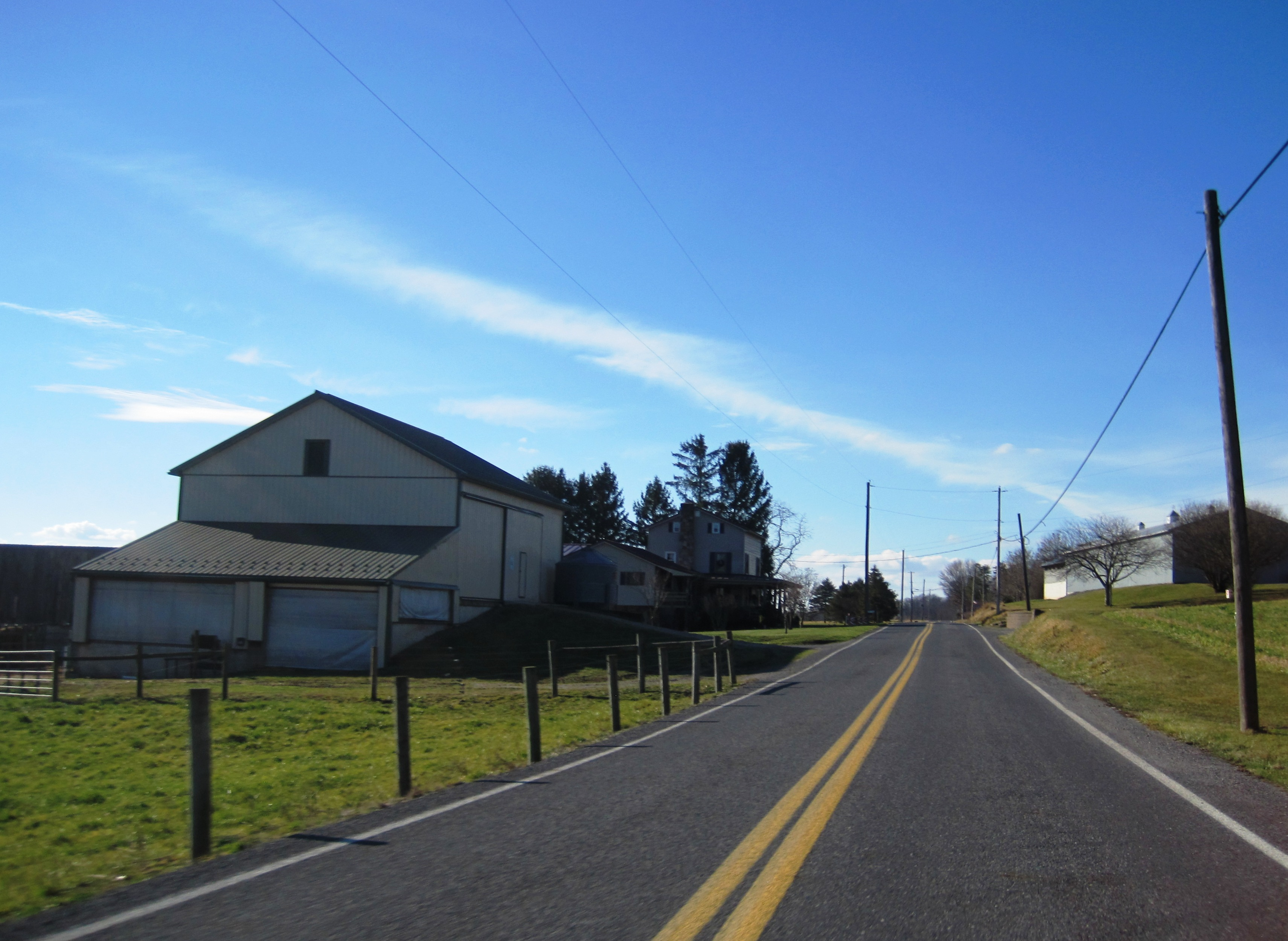
- Powells Valley Road in rural Jefferson Township

- Location in Dauphin County and state of Pennsylvania.
- Country: United States
- State: Pennsylvania
- County: Dauphin

Area
  - Total: 24.36 sq mi (63.08 km^{2})
  - Land: 24.36 sq mi (63.08 km^{2})
  - Water: 0 sq mi (0.00 km^{2})

Population (2020)
  - Total: 359 ▼
  - Estimate (2023): 356
  - Density: 15.4/sq mi (5.96/km^{2})
- Time zone: UTC-5 (Eastern (EST))
  - Summer (DST): UTC-4 (EDT)
- Area code: 717
- FIPS code: 42-043-37864
- Website: www.jeffersontownshippa.org

Jefferson Township is a township in Dauphin County, Pennsylvania, United States. The population was 359 at the time of the 2020 census.

Jefferson Township was formed in 1842 and named for Thomas Jefferson, third President of the United States.

== Geography ==
Jefferson Township is located in northeastern Dauphin County, and is bordered on the south by the ridge crest of Peters Mountain. Most of the township is mountainous and forested; only the western end of the township, which is situated in the valley of the North Fork of Powell Creek, has settlements and agriculture.

The unincorporated community of Carsonville is located in the North Fork valley.

According to the United States Census Bureau, the township has a total area of 24.4 square miles (63.1 km^{2}), all land.

== Demographics ==
Historical population
Census	Pop.	Note	%±
2010	362		—
2020	359		−0.8%
2023 (est.)	356		−0.8%
U.S. Decennial Census

As of the census of 2000, there were 327 people, 133 households, and 90 families residing in the township. The population density was 13.5 people per square mile (5.2/km^{2}). There were 146 housing units at an average density of 6.0/sq mi (2.3/km^{2}). The racial makeup of the township was 99.39% White, and 0.61% from two or more races. Hispanic or Latino of any race were 0.92% of the population.

There were 133 households, out of which 27.1% had children under the age of 18 living with them, 54.9% were married couples living together, 6.8% had a female householder with no husband present, and 31.6% were non-families. 27.1% of all households were made up of individuals, and 8.3% had someone living alone who was 65 years of age or older. The average household size was 2.46 and the average family size was 2.98.

In the township the population was spread out, with 22.6% under the age of 18, 7.0% from 18 to 24, 26.9% from 25 to 44, 29.7% from 45 to 64, and 13.8% who were 65 years of age or older. The median age was 41 years. For every 100 females, there were 113.7 males. For every 100 females age 18 and over, there were 116.2 males.

The median income for a household in the township was $49,750, and the median income for a family was $62,000. Males had a median income of $35,341 versus $30,750 for females. The per capita income for the township was $27,951. About 6.0% of families and 5.5% of the population were below the poverty line, including 9.2% of those under age 18 and 10.2% of those age 65 or over.
