= Powells Valley, Pennsylvania =

Unincorporated community in Pennsylvania, U.S.

Coordinates: 40.433°N 76.933°W

Powells Valley (variants include Powell Valley, Powl Valley and Powls Valley) is an unincorporated community in Halifax Township, Dauphin County, Pennsylvania, United States, situated in the Harrisburg–Carlisle metropolitan statistical area.

Powells Valley is located on Pennsylvania Route 225 just below Matamoras. The area began as a Post Office and is named for a Quaker family from York County who settled near the mouth of Powells Creek around 1760.
