= Dietrich, Pennsylvania =

Unincorporated community in Pennsylvania

Coordinates: 40.5284186°N 76.826082440°W

Dietrich is an unincorporated community in Jackson Township, Dauphin County, Pennsylvania, United States and is part of the Harrisburg-Carlisle Metropolitan Statistical Area.
