= Henniger Farm Covered Bridge =

- Henninger Farm Covered Bridge
- U.S. National Register of Historic Places
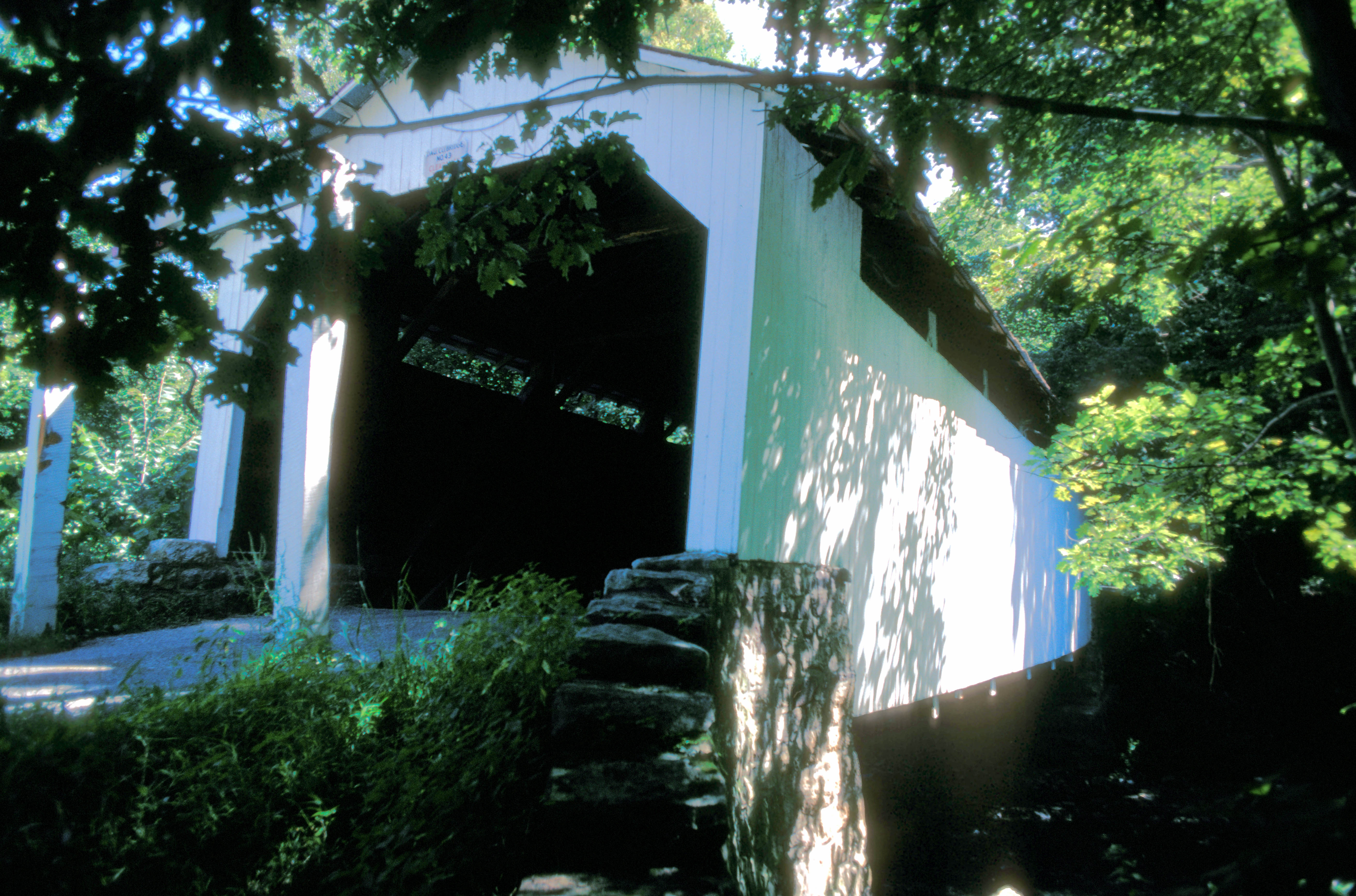
- The bridge in 1970

- Location within Pennsylvania Location within the United States
- Location: Northeast of Elizabethville, Washington Township, Pennsylvania
- Coordinates: 40°34′38″N 76°47′3″W
- Area: 0.1 acres (0.040 ha)
- Built: c. 1850
- Architectural style: Burr & Double-arch truss
- NRHP reference No.: 78002386
- Added to NRHP: December 18, 1978

The Henninger Farm Covered Bridge, also known as Dauphin County Bridge No. 43, is an historic covered bridge spanning Wiconisco Creek in Washington Township, Dauphin County, Pennsylvania, United States.

It is the only remaining covered bridge located wholly in Dauphin County.

It was listed on the National Register of Historic Places in 1978.

== History and architectural features ==
Built circa 1850, this historic structure is the only remaining covered bridge which is located entirely in Dauphin County. A single-span bridge with an overall length of seventy-two feet, its deck has a width of sixteen feet. Its clearance is eleven feet. The trussing system is a combination of Burr and Double-arch truss.
