= Killinger, Pennsylvania =

Unincorporated community in Pennsylvania, U.S.

Coordinates: 40.562°N 76.923°W

Killinger is an unincorporated community in Upper Paxton Township in Dauphin County, Pennsylvania. It is part of the Harrisburg–Carlisle metropolitan statistical area and lies within ZIP Code 17061. but uses the Millersburg post office.

Killinger was named for John W. Killinger.
