= Halifax, Pennsylvania =

Borough in Pennsylvania, US

- Borough
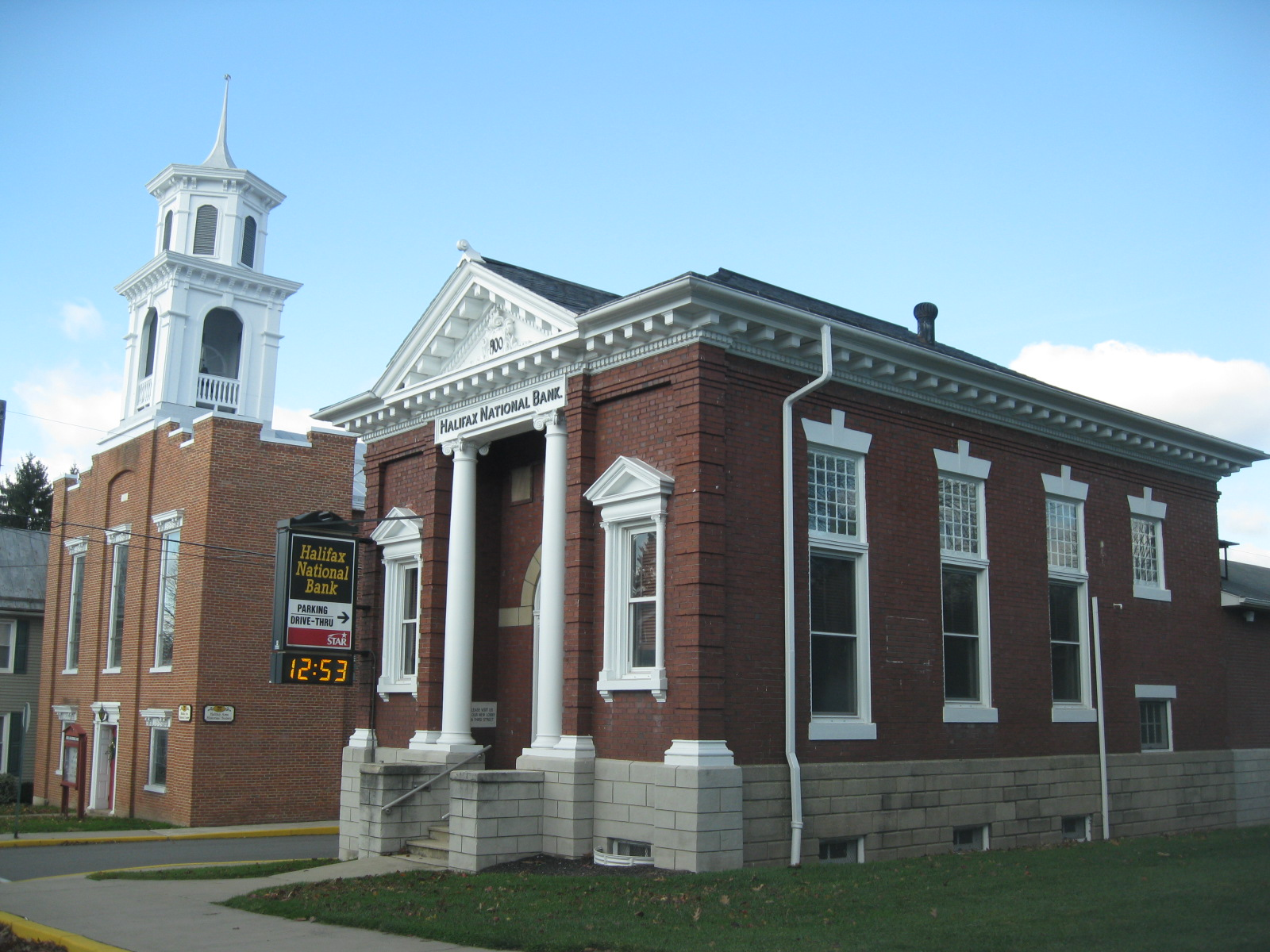
- Halifax National Bank

- Location in Dauphin County and the U.S. state of Pennsylvania.

- Location in Pennsylvania and the United States Halifax (the United States)
- Coordinates: 40°28′03″N 76°55′52″W
- Country: United States
- State: Pennsylvania
- County: Dauphin
- Settled: 1784
- Incorporated: 1785

Government
  - Type: Borough Council
  - Mayor: Jeffrey O. Enders

Area
  - Total: 0.34 sq mi (0.87 km^{2})
  - Land: 0.34 sq mi (0.87 km^{2})
  - Water: 0 sq mi (0.00 km^{2})
- Elevation: 433 ft (132 m)

Population (2020)
  - Total: 796
  - Density: 2,372.1/sq mi (915.87/km^{2})
- Time zone: UTC-5 (Eastern (EST))
  - Summer (DST): UTC-4 (EDT)
- ZIP code: 17032
- Area codes: 717 and 223
- FIPS code: 42-32032
- Website: halifaxborough.com

Halifax is a borough in Dauphin County, Pennsylvania, United States. Halifax was incorporated as a borough on May 29, 1785. It is situated at the confluence of Armstrong Creek and the Susquehanna River. The population was 795 at the 2020 census. It is part of the Harrisburg metropolitan area.

Fort Halifax was located along the Susquehanna River near the present borough. It was a temporary stronghold for the Pennsylvania colonial militia from 1756 to 1757, during the French and Indian War. Prior to settlement by Europeans the area was inhabited by North American Indians, presumably Susquehannocks, evidenced by frequent unearthing of tools and arrowheads by local residents and farmers.

Just outside the borough of Halifax lies the Clemson Island Prehistoric District, on Clemson Island which falls under the jurisdiction of Halifax Township.

== History ==
The Legislative Route 1 Sycamore Allee is located along both sides of the road south of Halifax and on the east side of the road north of Halifax; it was listed on the National Register of Historic Places in 2007.

== Geography ==
Halifax is located in western Dauphin County at 40°28′3″N 76°55′52″W (40.467623, -76.931156), on the east bank of the Susquehanna River. Pennsylvania Route 147 passes through the borough, leading north along the Susquehanna 6 miles (10 km) to Millersburg and southwest 7 miles (11 km) to U.S. Route 22 near Duncannon. Pennsylvania Route 225 leads northeast from Halifax 9 miles (14 km) to Elizabethville. It follows PA 147 south out of Halifax, then splits off to head south over Peters Mountain to Dauphin, 9 miles (14 km) south of Halifax.

According to the United States Census Bureau, Halifax has a total area of 0.34 square miles (0.87 km^{2}), all land.

== Demographics ==
Historical population
Census	Pop.	Note	%±
1850	436		—
1860	473		8.5%
1870	568		20.1%
1880	580		2.1%
1890	515		−11.2%
1900	618		20.0%
1910	745		20.6%
1920	771		3.5%
1930	757		−1.8%
1940	813		7.4%
1950	822		1.1%
1960	824		0.2%
1970	907		10.1%
1980	909		0.2%
1990	911		0.2%
2000	875		−4.0%
2010	841		−3.9%
2020	796		−5.4%
2021 (est.)	794	▼	−0.3%
U.S. Decennial Census

As of the census of 2000, there were 875 people, 386 households, and 240 families residing in the borough. The population density was 2,578.4 inhabitants per square mile (995.5/km^{2}). There were 419 housing units at an average density of 1,234.7 per square mile (476.7/km^{2}). The racial makeup of the borough was 98.40% White, 0.46% Asian, 0.11% from other races, and 1.03% from two or more races. Hispanic or Latino of any race were 1.37% of the population.

There were 386 households, out of which 32.6% had children under the age of 18 living with them, 43.8% were married couples living together, 12.7% had a female householder with no husband present, and 37.6% were non-families. 33.2% of all households were made up of individuals, and 15.8% had someone living alone who was 65 years of age or older. The average household size was 2.27 and the average family size was 2.85.

In the borough the population was spread out, with 26.1% under the age of 18, 7.3% from 18 to 24, 30.2% from 25 to 44, 20.8% from 45 to 64, and 15.7% who were 65 years of age or older. The median age was 36 years. For every 100 females, there were 91.9 males. For every 100 females age 18 and over, there were 85.4 males.

The median income for a household in the borough was $31,597, and the median income for a family was $37,222. Males had a median income of $33,438 versus $24,643 for females. The per capita income for the borough was $16,443. About 7.7% of families and 11.0% of the population were below the poverty line, including 18.8% of those under 18 and 13.6% of those over 64.
