= Airport Connector (Harrisburg) =

Highway in Pennsylvania

Route information
- Maintained by PennDOT
- Length: 1.940 mi (3.122 km)
- Existed: 1977–present
- Component highways: SR 3032 (unsigned) entire length

Major junctions
- South end: PA 230 / Airport Drive in Lower Swatara Township
- North end: PA 283 in Lower Swatara Township

Location
- Country: United States
- State: Pennsylvania
- Counties: Dauphin

Highway system
- Pennsylvania State Route System; Interstate; US; State; Scenic; Legislative

The Airport Connector is a 1.9-mile-long (3.1 km) freeway in the Harrisburg, Pennsylvania, area in the Commonwealth of Pennsylvania. It connects PA 283 to Harrisburg International Airport. There is one intermediate interchange with PA 230.

The highway is one of only three freeways in Pennsylvania with no posted route number. In the Location Referencing System, it is designated State Route 3032 by the Pennsylvania Department of Transportation.

== Route description ==
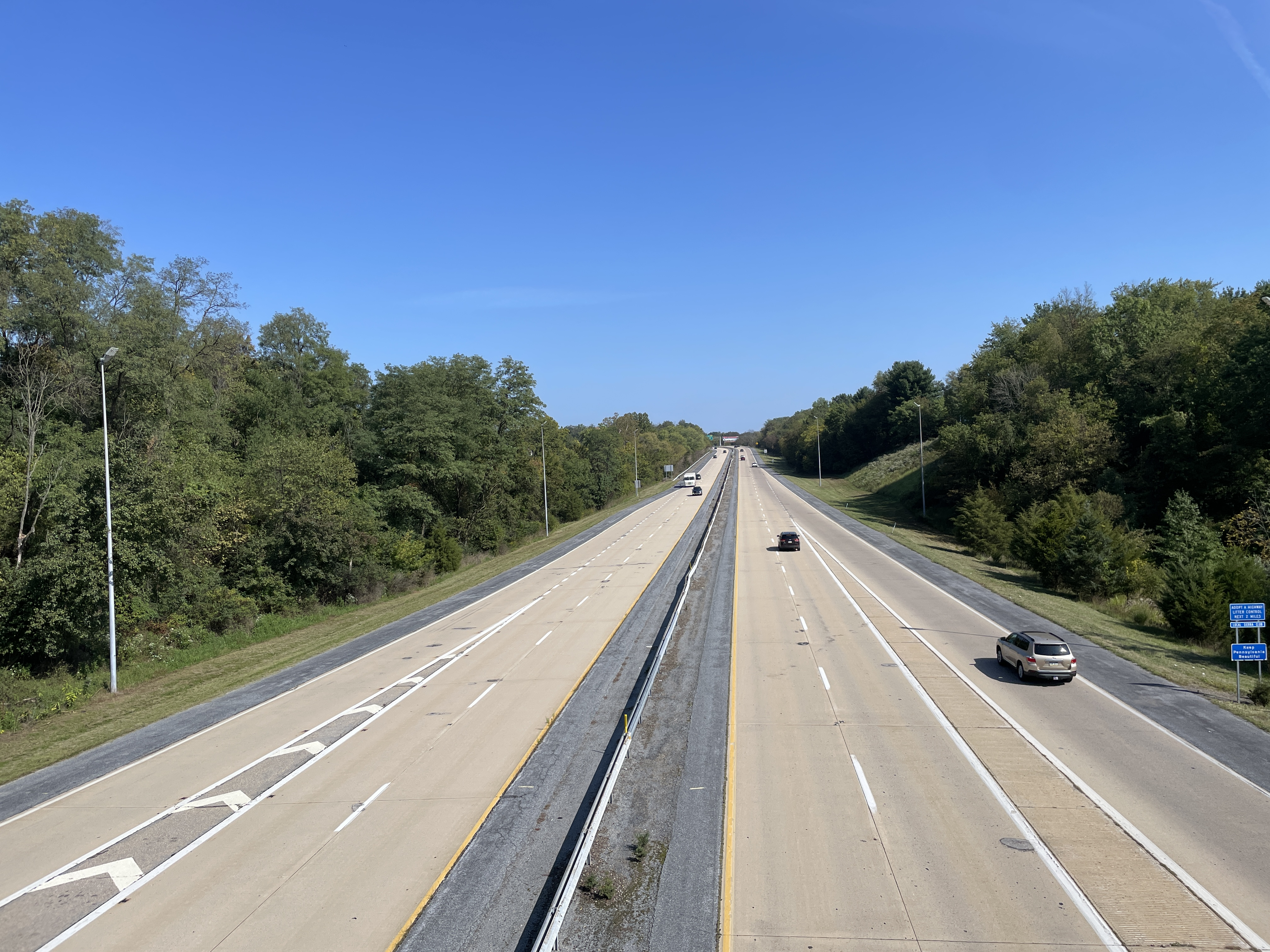
Airport Connector northbound past PA 230 in Lower Swatara Township

The Airport Connector begins at the entrance to Harrisburg International Airport in Lower Swatara Township, Dauphin County, where the roadway continues south to loop around the terminal. Past the airport, the road passes over Norfolk Southern's Royalton Branch and Amtrak's Keystone Corridor railroad lines before immediately reaching a partial cloverleaf interchange with PA 230. From this point, the four-lane freeway heads north-northeast through wooded areas adjacent to homes and farms, crossing over the Pennsylvania Turnpike (I-76) without an interchange as it curves north-northwest. The freeway passes more areas of farms and woods before it reaches its terminus at a trumpet interchange with the PA 283 freeway. The interchange also provides partial access between PA 283 and PA 441, but the Airport Connector has no connection to the latter route.

== History ==
With the opening of PA 283 in 1972 and the completion of new terminals at Harrisburg International Airport the following year, a need was determined to provide a direct connection between the two, as the airport was not served by the area's freeway system. Construction began in 1974 and the connector opened to traffic in 1977.

== Exit list ==
The entire road is in Lower Swatara Township, Dauphin County. All exits are unnumbered.

mi	km	Destinations	Notes
0.000	0.000	Airport Drive – Harrisburg International Airport	Southern terminus
0.261	0.420	PA 230 – Highspire, Middletown	Access to Penn State Harrisburg
1.940	3.122	PA 283 to I-283 – Harrisburg, Lancaster	Northern terminus; access to Penna Turnpike, Philadelphia, and Pittsburgh
1.000 mi = 1.609 km; 1.000 km = 0.621 mi
