= Lenkerville, Pennsylvania =

Unincorporated community in Pennsylvania, US

Coordinates: 40°32′02″N 76°57′33″W

- Census-designated place
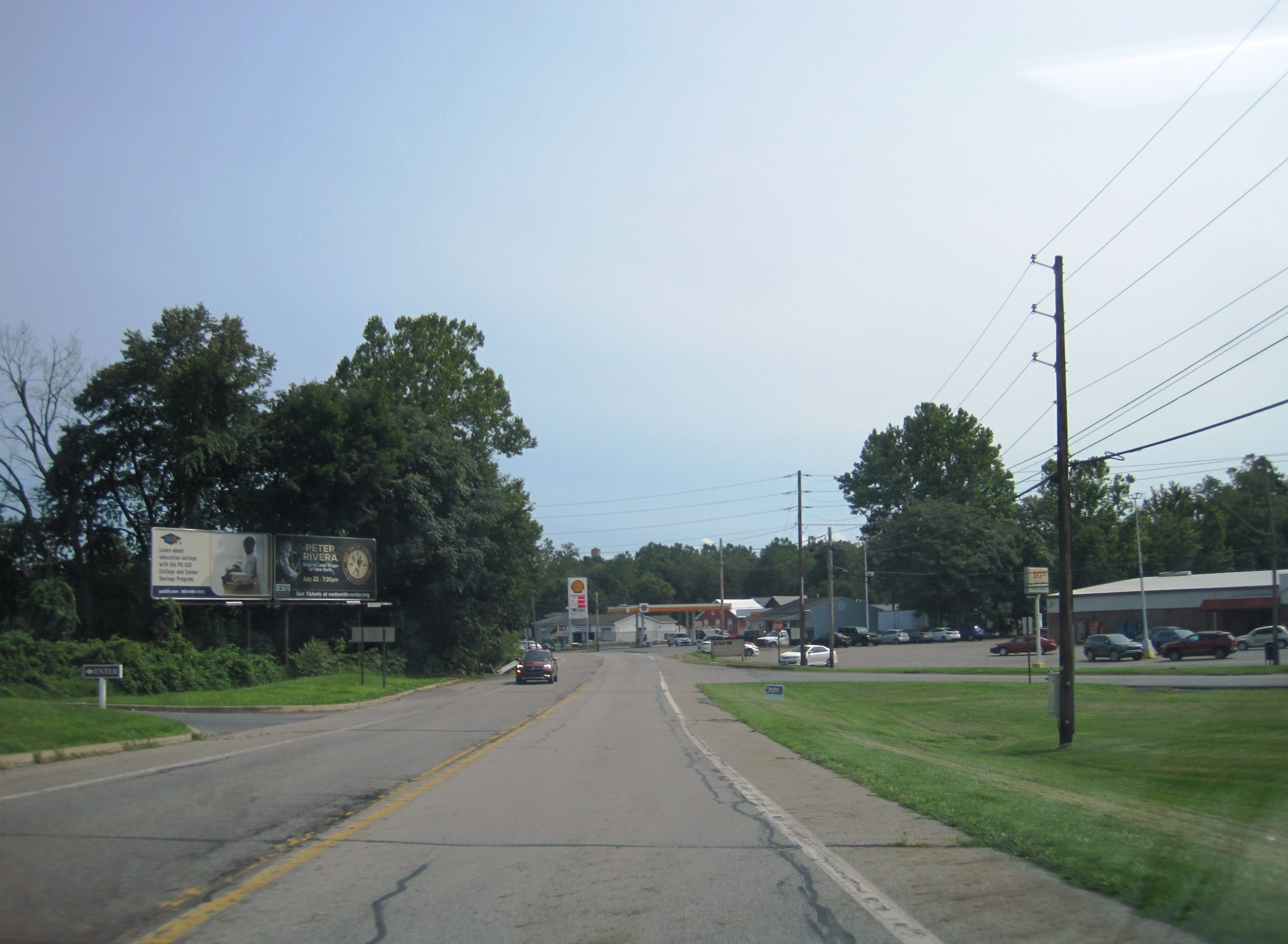
- Photo taken along northbound PA 147

- Location in Dauphin County and state of Pennsylvania.
- Country: United States
- State: Pennsylvania
- County: Dauphin
- Township: Upper Paxton

Area
  - Total: 0.34 sq mi (0.87 km^{2})
  - Land: 0.34 sq mi (0.87 km^{2})
  - Water: 0 sq mi (0.00 km^{2})
- Elevation: 410 ft (120 m)

Population (2020)
  - Total: 504
  - Density: 1,502.7/sq mi (580.18/km^{2})
- Time zone: UTC-5 (Eastern (EST))
  - Summer (DST): UTC-4 (EDT)
- ZIP code: 17061
- FIPS code: 42-42704
- GNIS feature ID: 1179197

Lenkerville is an unincorporated community and census-designated place in Upper Paxton Township, Pennsylvania, United States. It is less than one mile south of the borough of Millersburg along Pennsylvania Route 147, which lies on the east bank of the Susquehanna River. As of the 2010 census the population was 550.

== Demographics ==
Historical population
Census	Pop.	Note	%±
2020	504		—
U.S. Decennial Census
