= Matamoras, Dauphin County, Pennsylvania =

Unincorporated community in Pennsylvania, U.S.

Matamoras, Pennsylvania
- Unincorporated community
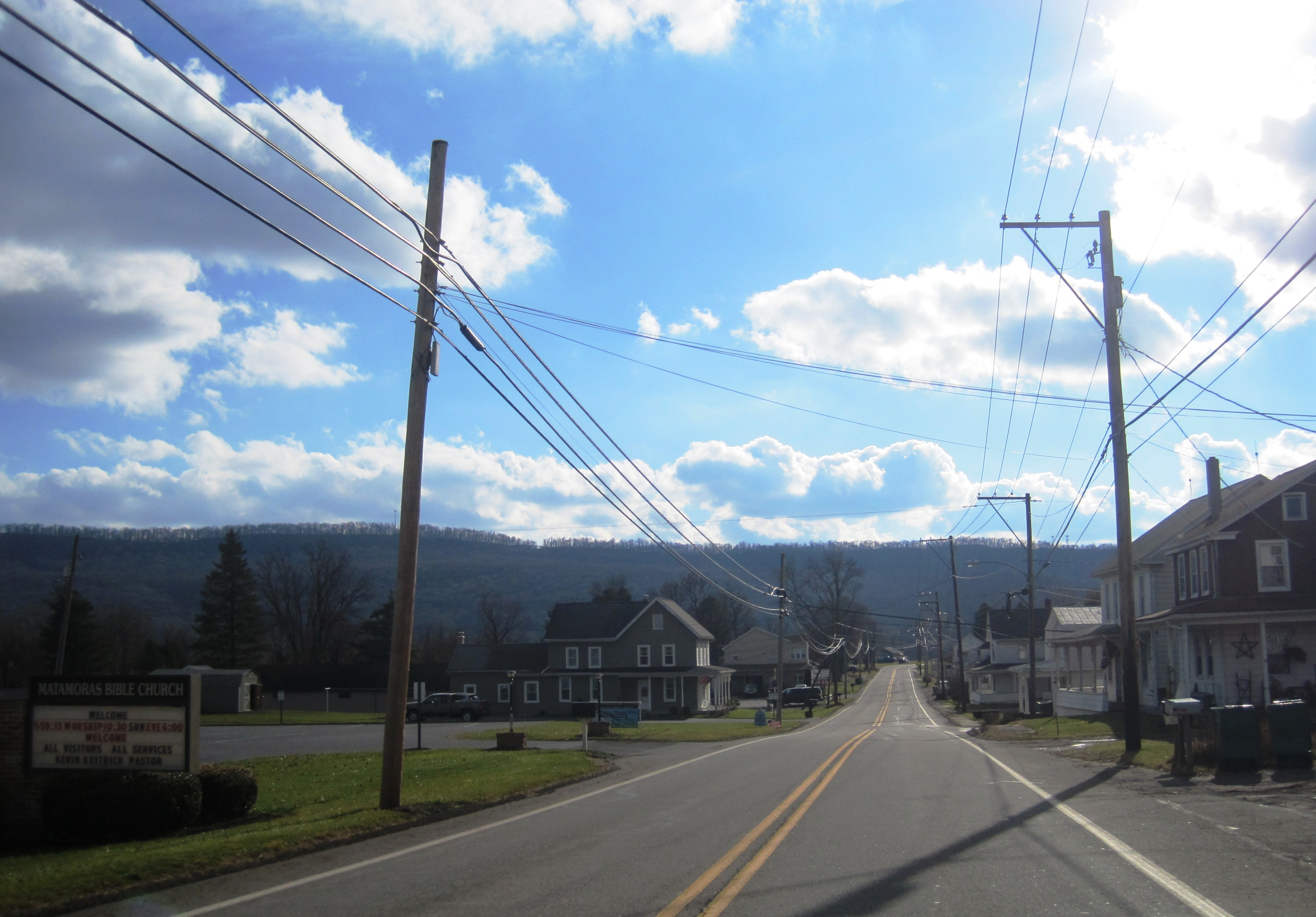
- Southbound PA 225 through Matamoras

- Location within the state of Pennsylvania Matamoras (the United States)
- Country: United States
- State: Pennsylvania
- County: Dauphin
- Township: Halifax
- Elevation: 640 ft (200 m)
- Time zone: UTC-5 (Eastern (EST))
  - Summer (DST): UTC-4 (EDT)

Matamoras is an unincorporated community in Halifax Township, Dauphin County, Pennsylvania, United States, located in the Harrisburg-Carlisle Metropolitan Statistical Area.

Matamoras was named after the Mexican city of Matamoros, the scene of a battle in the Mexican–American War.
