= Fisherville, Dauphin County, Pennsylvania =

Unincorporated community in Pennsylvania, U.S.

Fisherville, Pennsylvania
- Unincorporated community
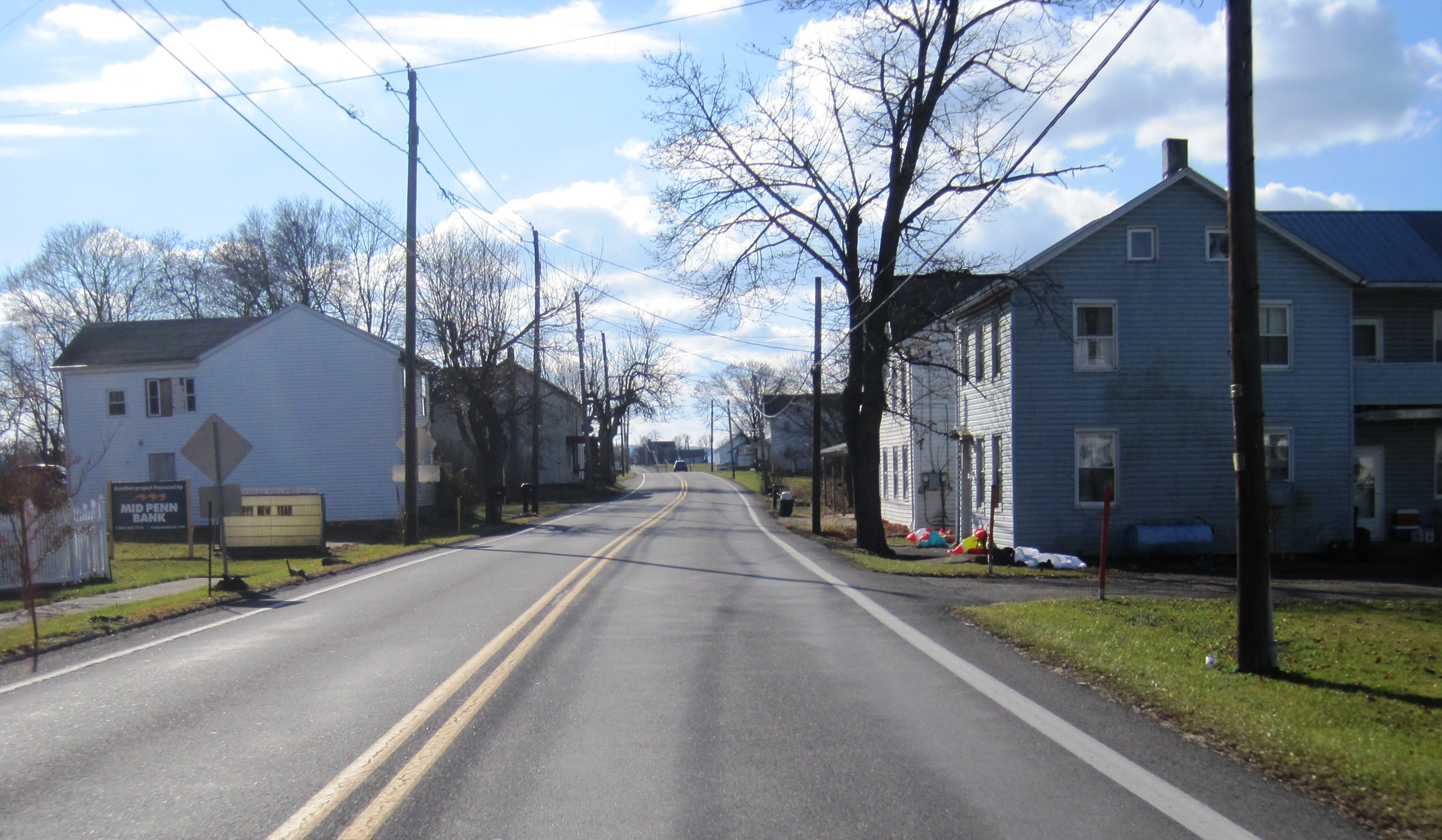
- Southbound PA 225 through Fisherville

- Location within the state of Pennsylvania Fisherville (the United States)
- Country: United States
- State: Pennsylvania
- County: Dauphin
- Township: Jackson
- Elevation: 604 ft (184 m)
- Time zone: UTC-5 (Eastern (EST))
  - Summer (DST): UTC-4 (EDT)

Fisherville is an unincorporated community in Jackson Township, Dauphin County, in the U.S. state of Pennsylvania.

== History ==
Fisherville was laid out in 1858, and named for Maj. George Fisher. A post office was established at Fisherville in 1851, and remained in operation until it was discontinued in 1936.
