= Carsonville, Pennsylvania =

Unincorporated community in Pennsylvania, US

- Unincorporated community
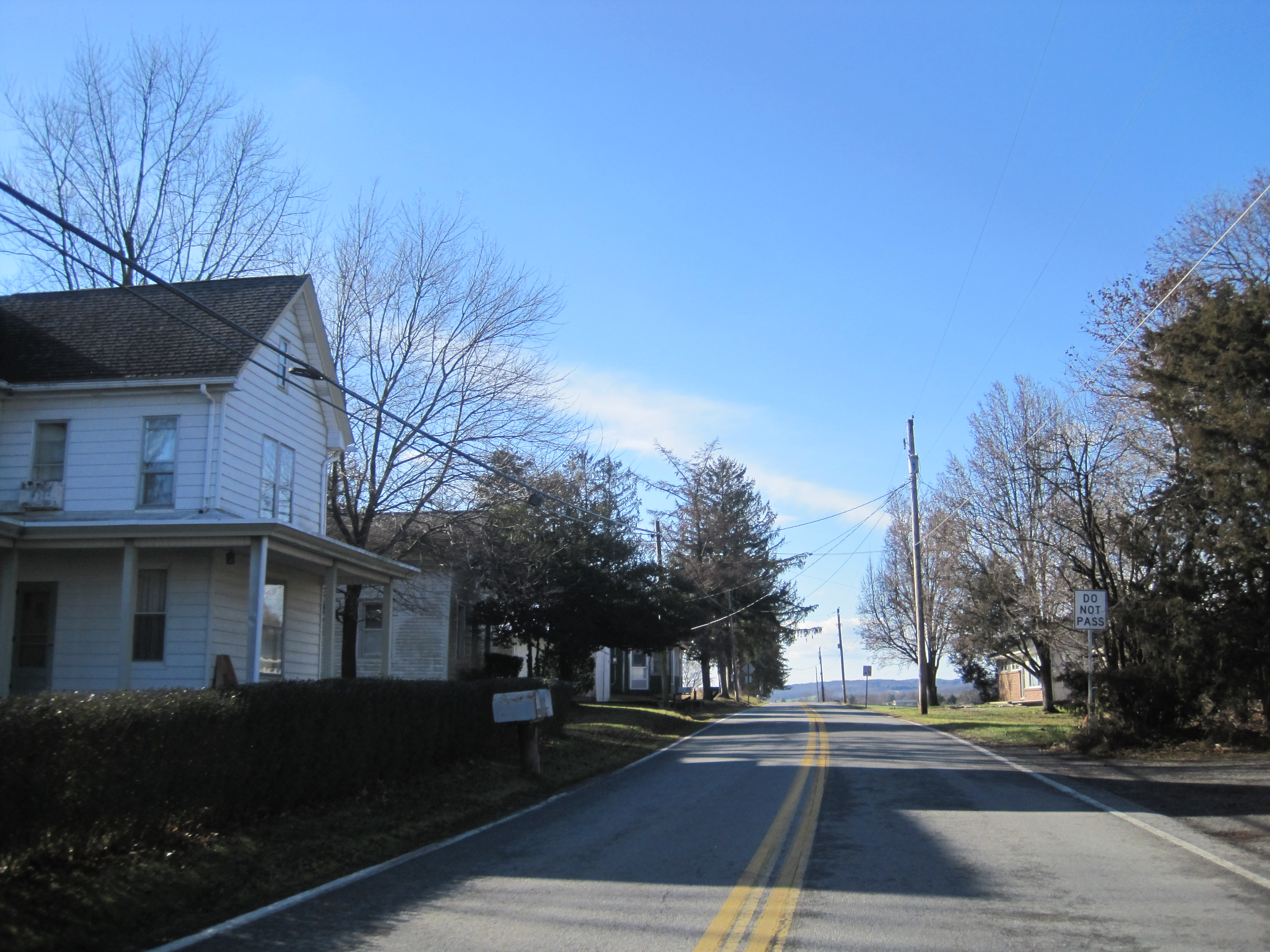
- Carsonville along Powells Valley Road

- Location within Pennsylvania
- Country: United States
- State: Pennsylvania
- County: Dauphin
- Township: Jefferson
- Elevation: 732 ft (223 m)
- Time zone: UTC-5 (Eastern (EST))
  - Summer (DST): UTC-4 (EDT)
- Area code: 717
- GNIS feature ID: 1171279

Carsonville is an unincorporated community in Jefferson Township, Dauphin County, Pennsylvania, United States and is part of the Harrisburg–Carlisle Metropolitan Statistical Area.

Carsonville was formerly the site of a post office.
