= Legislative Route 1 Sycamore Allee =

- U.S. National Register of Historic Places
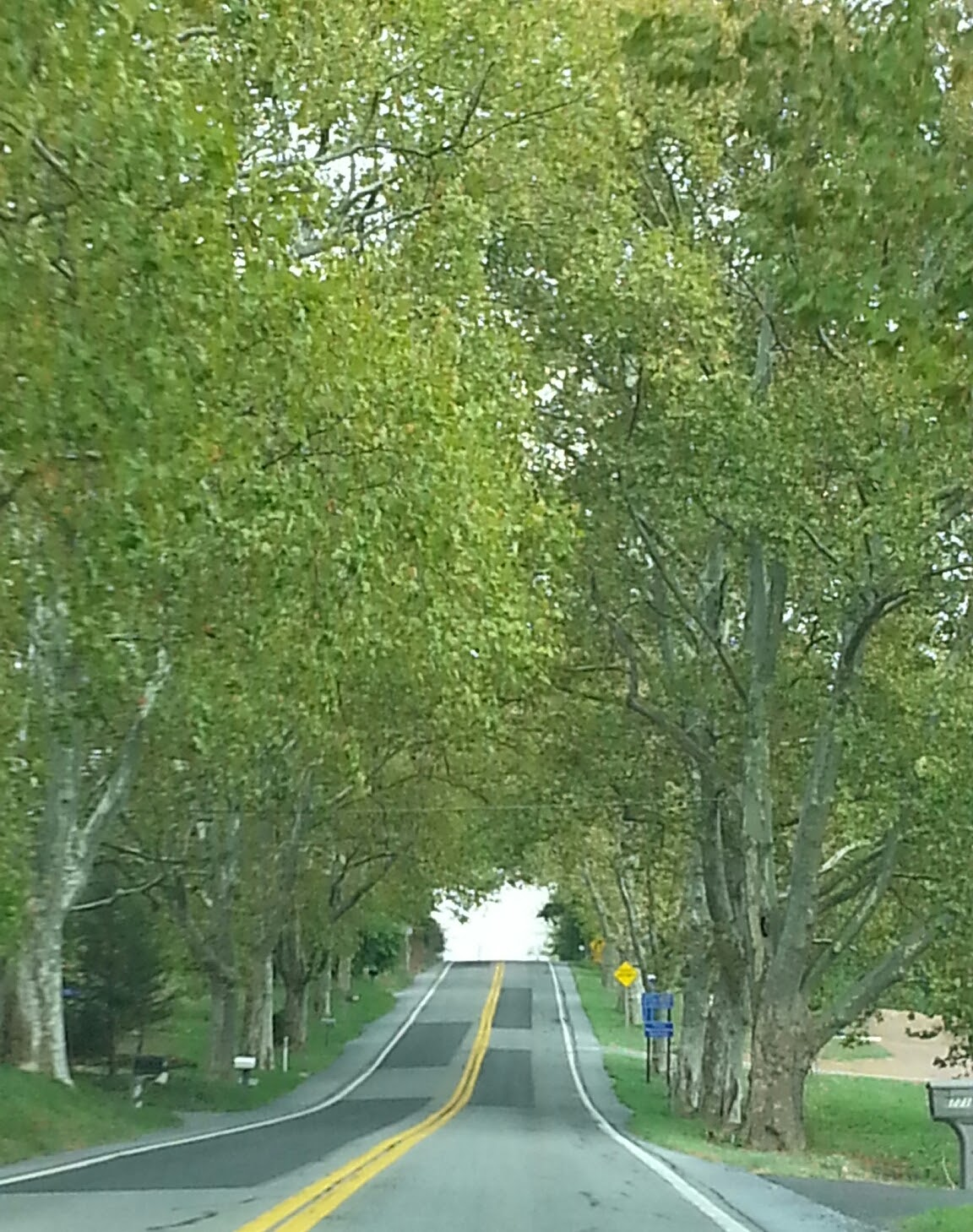
- in 2016

- Location within Pennsylvania Location within the United States
- Location: Legislative Route 1, approx. 1 mil N and S of Halifax, Halifax Township and Reed Township, Pennsylvania
- Coordinates: 40°28′3″N 76°55′52″W
- Area: 33.2 acres (13.4 ha)
- Built: 1922
- Architectural style: Allée
- NRHP reference No.: 07000029
- Added to NRHP: February 7, 2007

Legislative Route 1 Sycamore Allee is a historic roadway landscape in Halifax Township and Reed Township, Dauphin County, Pennsylvania, United States. It consists of 314 sycamore trees planted along Legislative Route 1. They are located along both sides of the road south of Halifax and on the east side of the road north of Halifax. Approximately 536 trees were originally planted in 1922.

It was added to the National Register of Historic Places in 2007.
