= Enders, Pennsylvania =

Unincorporated community in Pennsylvania, US

- Unincorporated community
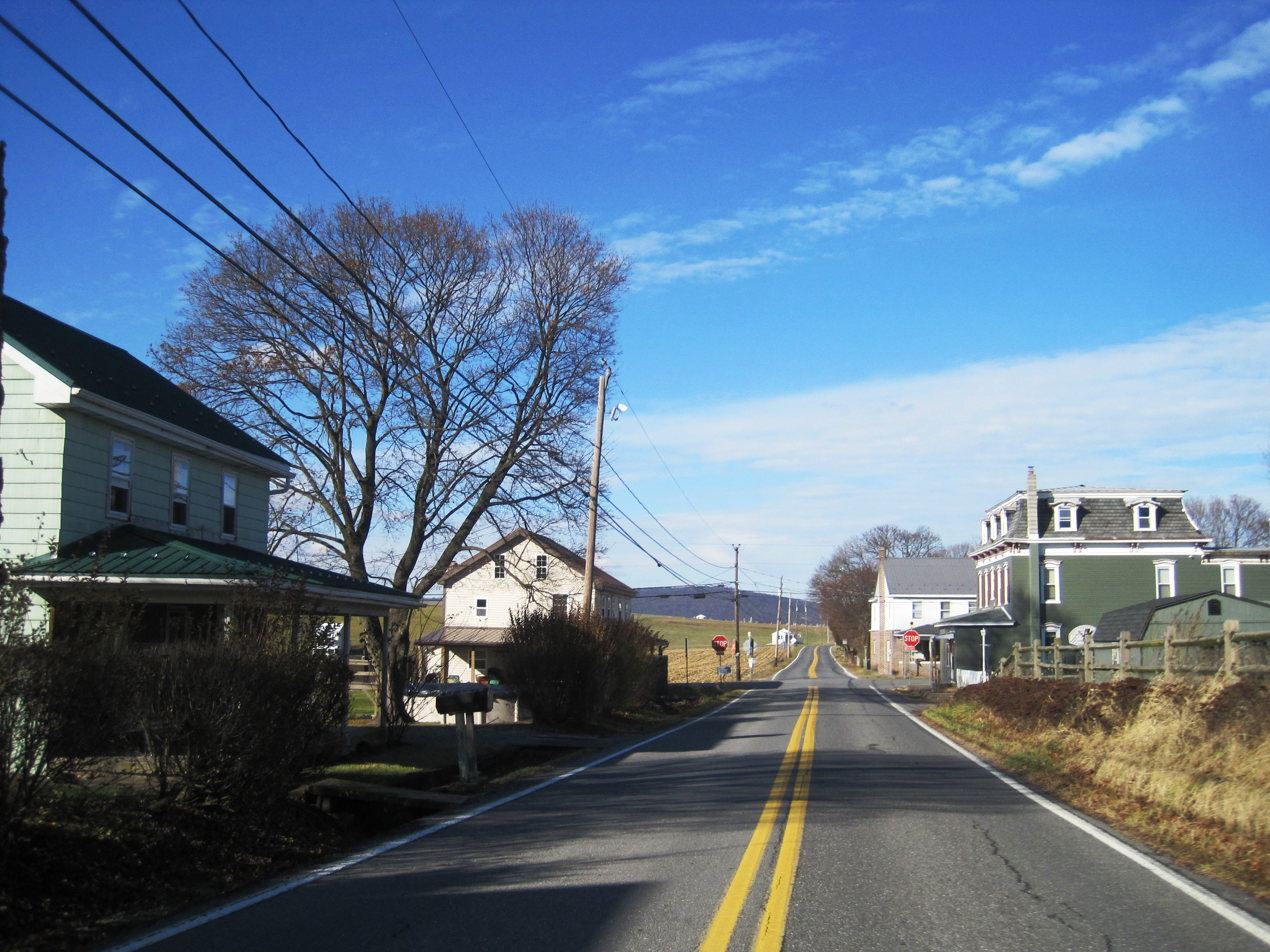
- Northbound Enders Road

- Location within the state of Pennsylvania Enders (the United States)
- Coordinates: 40°29′30″N 76°50′59″W
- Country: United States
- State: Pennsylvania
- County: Dauphin
- Township: Jackson
- Elevation: 669 ft (204 m)
- Time zone: UTC-5 (Eastern (EST))
  - Summer (DST): UTC-4 (EDT)

Enders is an unincorporated community located in Jackson Township, Dauphin County, Pennsylvania, United States, just north of Harrisburg. The town lies in the Eastern Standard time zone and has an elevation of 669 feet. Although it has an official federally recognized name, it is considered to be not incorporated.

Originally called Jacksonville, Enders was laid out circa 1825.
