= Washington Township, Dauphin County, Pennsylvania =

Township in Pennsylvania, US

Coordinates: 40°34′00″N 76°47′59″W

- Township
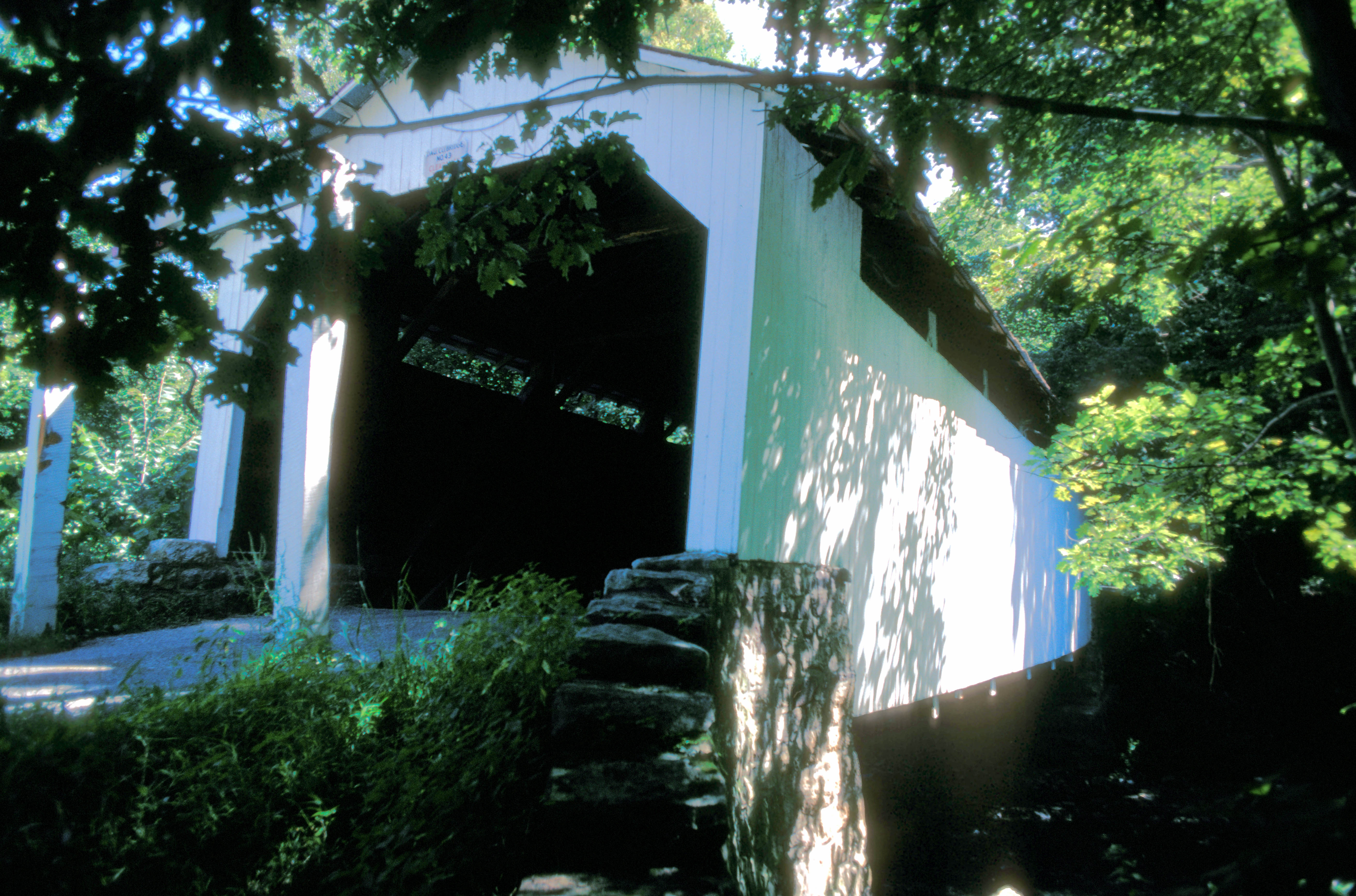
- Henniger Farm Covered Bridge

- Location in Dauphin County and state of Pennsylvania.
- Country: United States
- State: Pennsylvania
- County: Dauphin
- Incorporated: 1846

Area
  - Total: 17.71 sq mi (45.88 km^{2})
  - Land: 17.71 sq mi (45.88 km^{2})
  - Water: 0 sq mi (0.00 km^{2})

Population (2020)
  - Total: 2,130 ▼
  - Estimate (2023): 2,114
  - Density: 127.9/sq mi (49.37/km^{2})
- Time zone: UTC-5 (Eastern (EST))
  - Summer (DST): UTC-4 (EDT)
- Area code: 717
- FIPS code: 42-043-81216
- Website: wtwp.org

Washington Township is a township that is located in Dauphin County, Pennsylvania, United States. As of the 2020 census, the township population was 2,130, a decline from the figure of 2,268 that was tabulated in 2010.

== History ==
Washington Township was named for George Washington, first president of the United States.

The Henniger Farm Covered Bridge was listed on the National Register of Historic Places in 1978.

== Geography ==
According to the United States Census Bureau, the township has a total area of 17.7 square miles (45.9 km^{2}), all land.

Washington Township contains the communities of Big Run, Loyalton and Matterstown.

== Demographics ==
Historical population
Census	Pop.	Note	%±
2010	2,268		—
2020	2,130		−6.1%
2023 (est.)	2,114		−0.8%
U.S. Decennial Census

As of the census of 2000, there were 2,047 people, 756 households, and 597 families residing in the township.

The population density was 110.0 inhabitants per square mile (42.5/km^{2}). There were 787 housing units at an average density of 42.3 per square mile (16.3/km^{2}).

The racial makeup of the township was 98.34% White, 0.68% African American, 0.05% Native American, 0.15% Asian, 0.10% from other races, and 0.68% from two or more races. Hispanic or Latino of any race were 0.88% of the population.

There were 756 households, out of which 35.6% had children who were under the age of eighteen living with them; 67.5% were married couples living together, 7.5% had a female householder with no husband present, and 20.9% were non-families. Of all of the households that were documented, 17.1% were made up of individuals, and 10.1% had someone living alone who was sixty-five years of age or older.

The average household size was 2.69 and the average family size was 3.04.

Within the township, the population was spread out, with 25.9% of residents who were under the age of 18, 7.0% from 18 to 24, 28.9% from 25 to 44, 25.5% from 45 to 64, and 12.7% who were 65 years of age or older. The median age was 37 years.

For every 100 females, there were 102.7 males. For every 100 females age 18 and over, there were 98.7 males.

The median income for a household in the township was $45,000, and the median income for a family was $49,659. Males had a median income of $32,854 compared with that of $23,750 for females.

The per capita income for the township was $20,046.

Approximately 6.3% of families and 8.2% of the population were living below the poverty line, including 14.5% of those who were under the age of eighteen and 6.6% of those who were aged sixty-five or older.
