= Clemson Island Prehistoric District =

Historic district in Pennsylvania, United States

- U.S. National Register of Historic Places
- U.S. Historic district
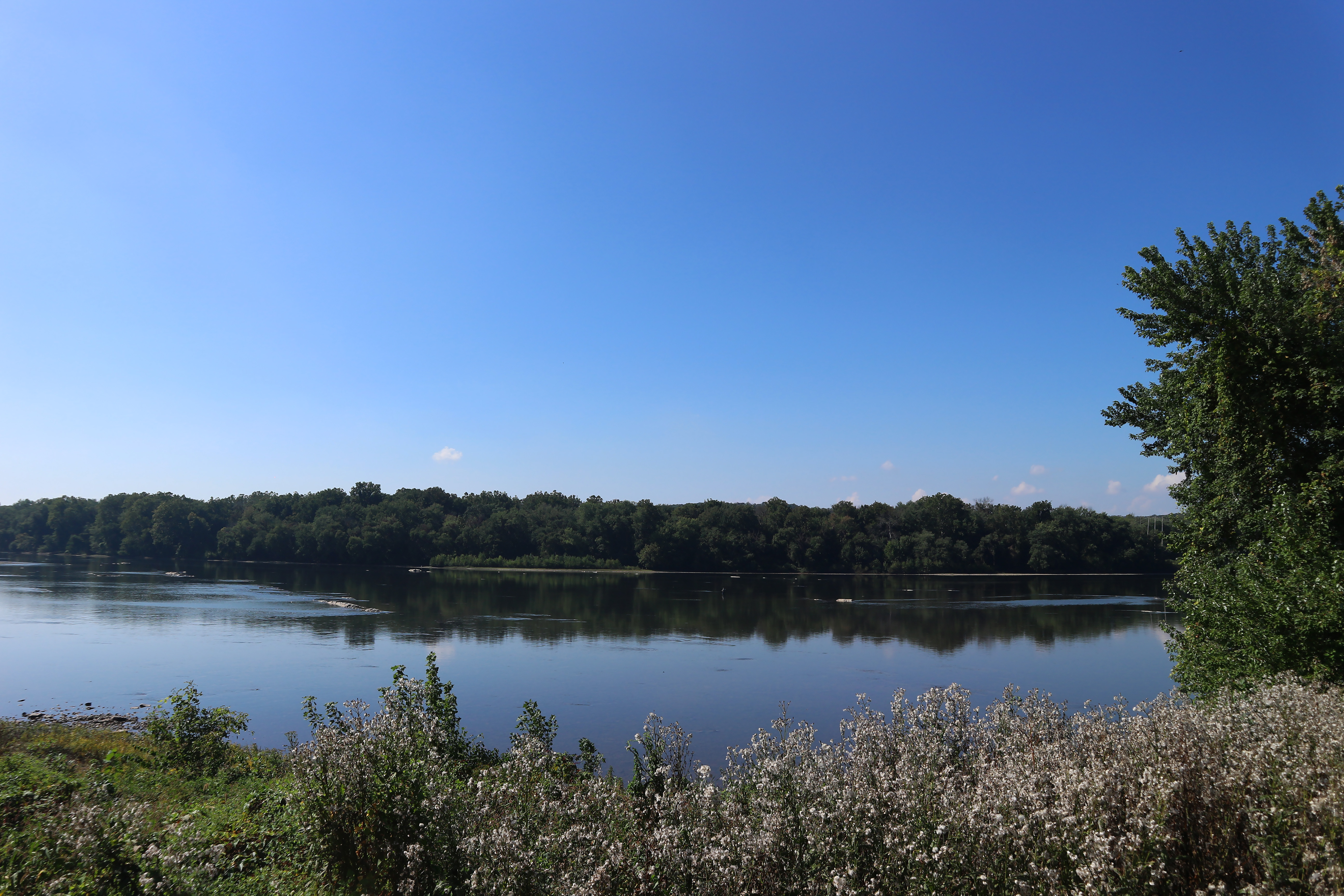
- Clemson Island

- Location within Pennsylvania Location within the United States
- Nearest city: Southern portion of Clemson Island in the Susquehanna River, Halifax Township, Pennsylvania
- Coordinates: 40°27′54.5″N 76°56′44.4″W
- Area: 14.5 acres (5.9 ha)
- NRHP reference No.: 81000540
- Added to NRHP: September 17, 1981

Clemson Island Prehistoric District is a historic archaeological site and national historic district located at Halifax Township, Dauphin County, Pennsylvania, United States. It is a series of three spatially discrete loci. They constitute a transitional Middle Woodland - Late Woodland (c. 900-1100 A.D.) earthwork mound and associated village. There is evidence of occupation from the Early Archaic period (c. 6,900 B.C.) to the 18th century. The mound was excavated in May and June 1929.

It was added to the National Register of Historic Places in 1981. The 123-acre island is accessible only by boat. It has been owned by the state of Pennsylvania since 1965 and managed as a wildlife preserve and improvement area.

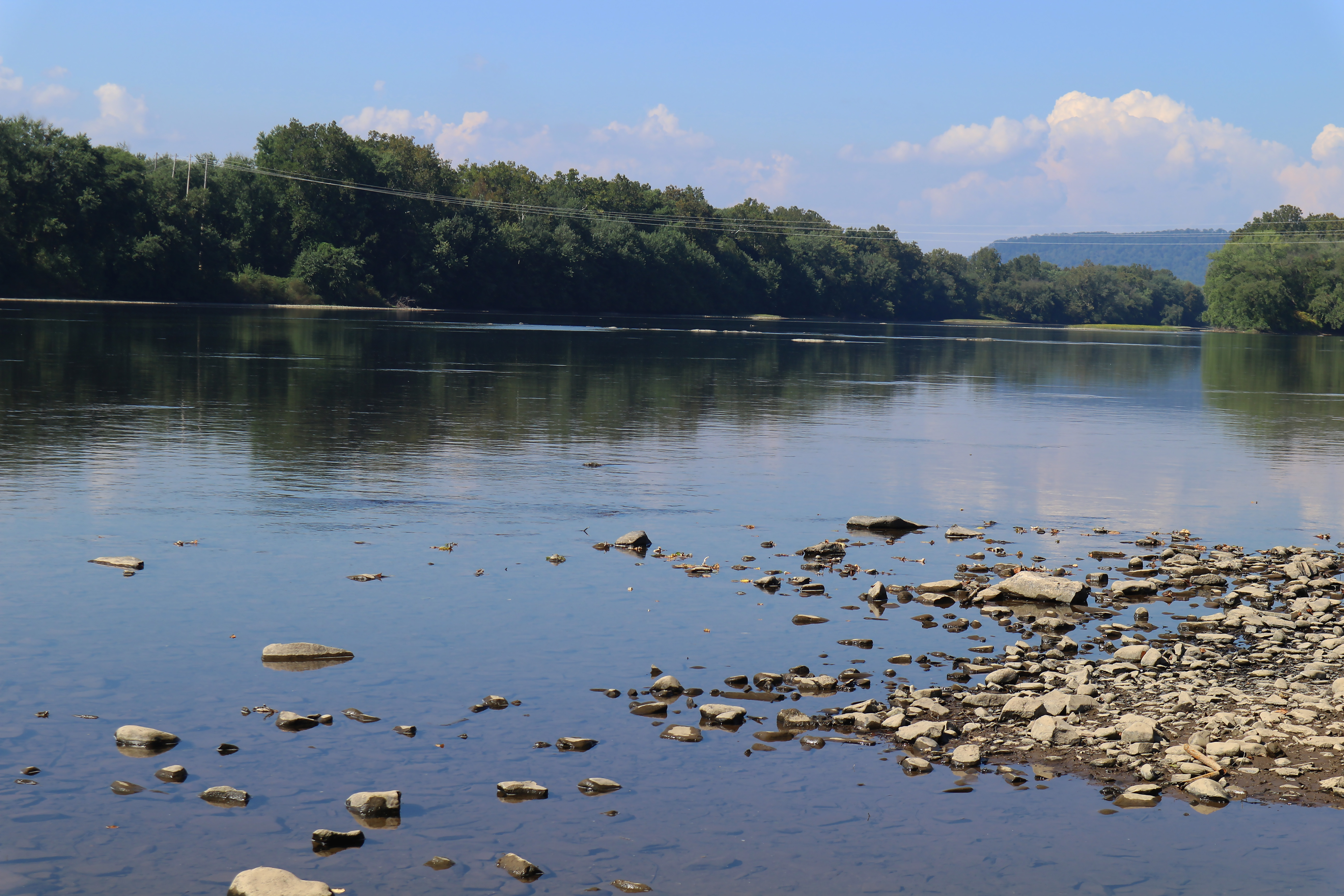
Northern Clemson Island
