= Upper Paxton Township, Pennsylvania =

Township in Pennsylvania, US

Coordinates: 40°37′36″N 76°56′59″W

- Township
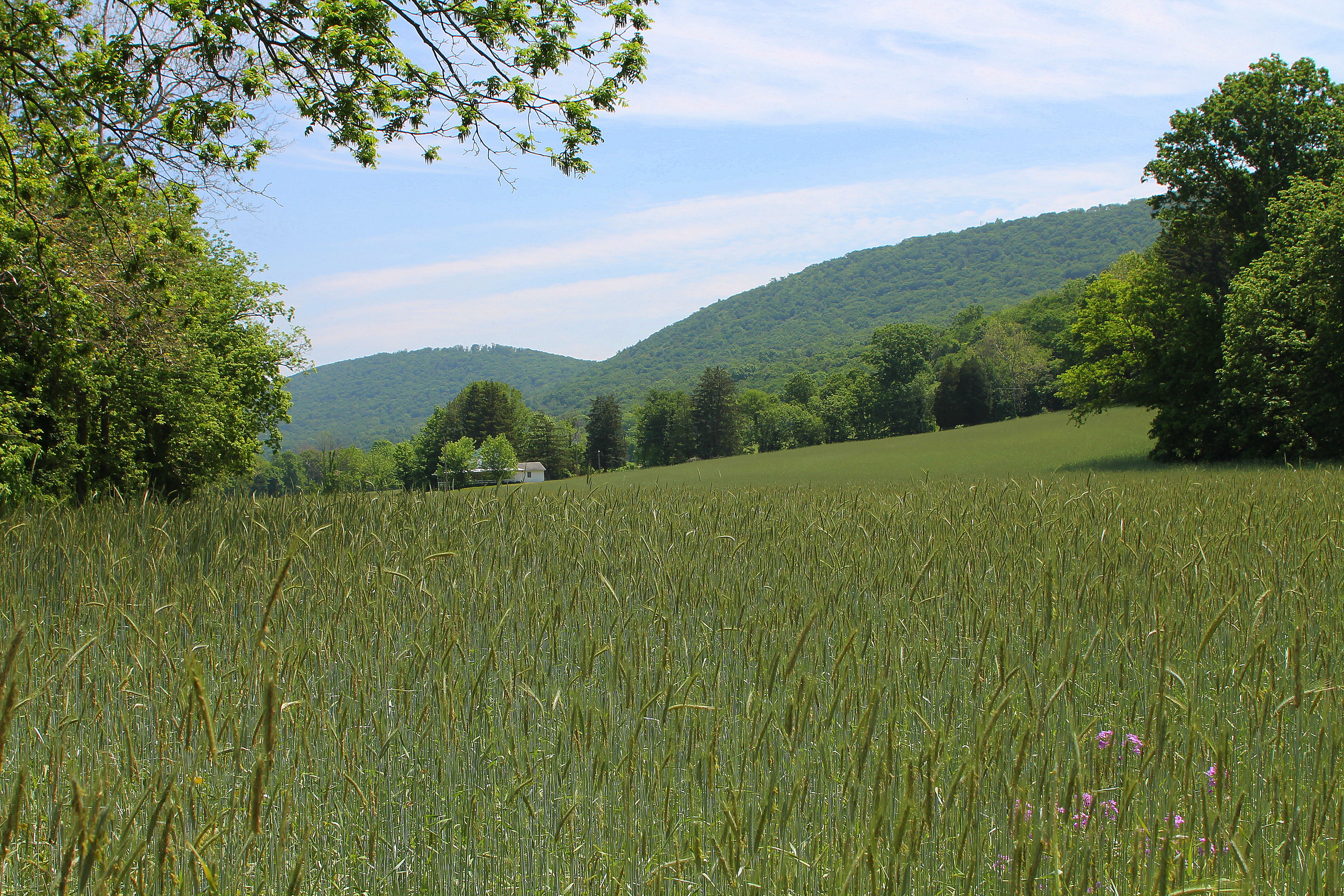
- Field and mountain in Upper Paxton Township

- Location in Dauphin County and state of Pennsylvania.
- Country: United States
- State: Pennsylvania
- County: Dauphin
- Incorporated: 1767

Area
  - Total: 31.24 sq mi (80.91 km^{2})
  - Land: 25.90 sq mi (67.07 km^{2})
  - Water: 5.34 sq mi (13.84 km^{2})

Population (2020)
  - Total: 4,008 ▼
  - Estimate (2023): 3,997
  - Density: 162.5/sq mi (62.74/km^{2})
- Time zone: UTC-5 (Eastern (EST))
  - Summer (DST): UTC-4 (EDT)
- Area code: 717
- FIPS code: 42-043-79216
- Website: www.upperpaxtontwp.org

Upper Paxton Township is a township in Dauphin County, Pennsylvania, United States. The population was 4,008 at the 2020 census.

== History ==
The Paxtang Township of Lancaster County was established in 1729. The spelling "Paxtang" is from the original Indian name Peshtank, which meant "standing water". The word "Paxton" is used today instead of Paxtang.

Paxton Township was divided several times. Hanover Township was separated off Paxton Township in 1736, and in 1767, the remainder of the township was split into Upper Paxton Township and Lower Paxton Township.

On March 4, 1785, Dauphin County was formed from Lancaster County. The word "Dauphin" refers to the Dauphin of France, heir apparent to the French throne, whose country the area government wanted to honor for its assistance in the Revolutionary War. According to the Middle Paxton Township website, two years later, in August 1787, the legislature split off Middle Paxton Township. The Lower Paxton Township website gives the date of formation of Middle Paxton Township as 1878.

== Geography ==
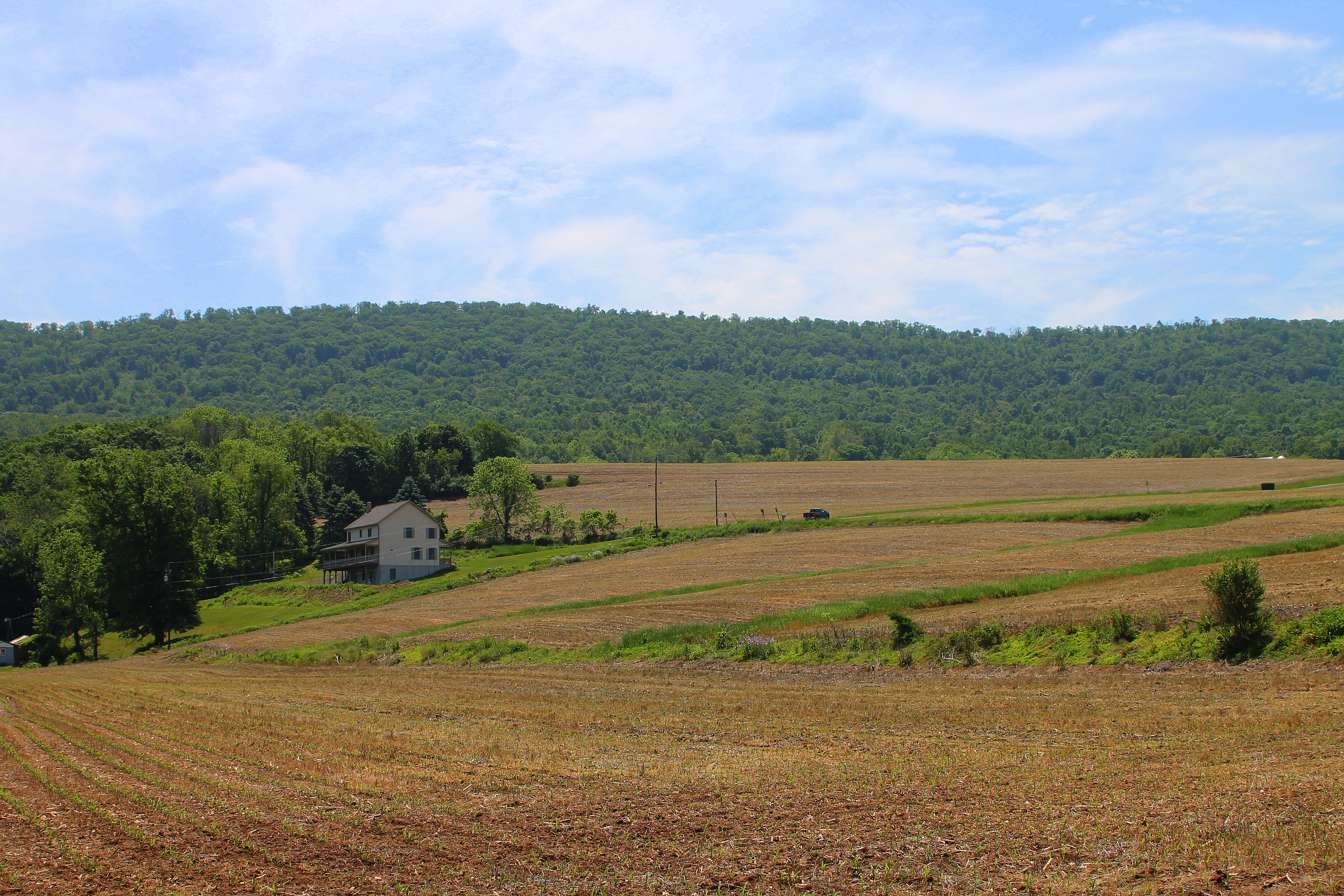
More scenery of Upper Paxton Township

According to the United States Census Bureau, Upper Paxton Township has a total area of 31.2 square miles (80.9 km^{2}), of which 25.9 square miles (67.1 km^{2}) is land and 5.3 square miles (13.8 km^{2}), or 17.1%, is water. It contains the census-designated place of Lenkerville.

== Demographics ==
Historical population
Census	Pop.	Note	%±
2010	4,161		—
2020	4,008		−3.7%
2023 (est.)	3,997		−0.3%
U.S. Decennial Census

As of the census of 2000, there were 3,930 people, 1,458 households, and 1,096 families residing in the township. The population density was 151.3 inhabitants per square mile (58.4/km^{2}). There were 1,528 housing units at an average density of 58.8 per square mile (22.7/km^{2}). The racial makeup of the township was 98.91% White, 0.41% African American, 0.13% Native American, 0.25% Asian, 0.10% from other races, and 0.20% from two or more races. Hispanic or Latino of any race were 0.38% of the population.

There were 1,458 households, out of which 32.2% had children under the age of 18 living with them, 65.8% were married couples living together, 6.8% had a female householder with no husband present, and 24.8% were non-families. 20.9% of all households were made up of individuals, and 10.0% had someone living alone who was 65 years of age or older. The average household size was 2.55 and the average family size was 2.97.

In the township the population was spread out, with 23.2% under the age of 18, 6.8% from 18 to 24, 27.0% from 25 to 44, 24.2% from 45 to 64, and 18.8% who were 65 years of age or older. The median age was 41 years. For every 100 females, there were 94.6 males. For every 100 females age 18 and over, there were 90.7 males.

The median income for a household in the township was $39,864, and the median income for a family was $48,981. Males had a median income of $33,731 versus $26,509 for females. The per capita income for the township was $17,945. About 7.1% of families and 8.7% of the population were below the poverty line, including 13.0% of those under age 18 and 8.1% of those age 65 or over.
