= Loyalton, Pennsylvania =

Unincorporated community in Pennsylvania, US

- Unincorporated community
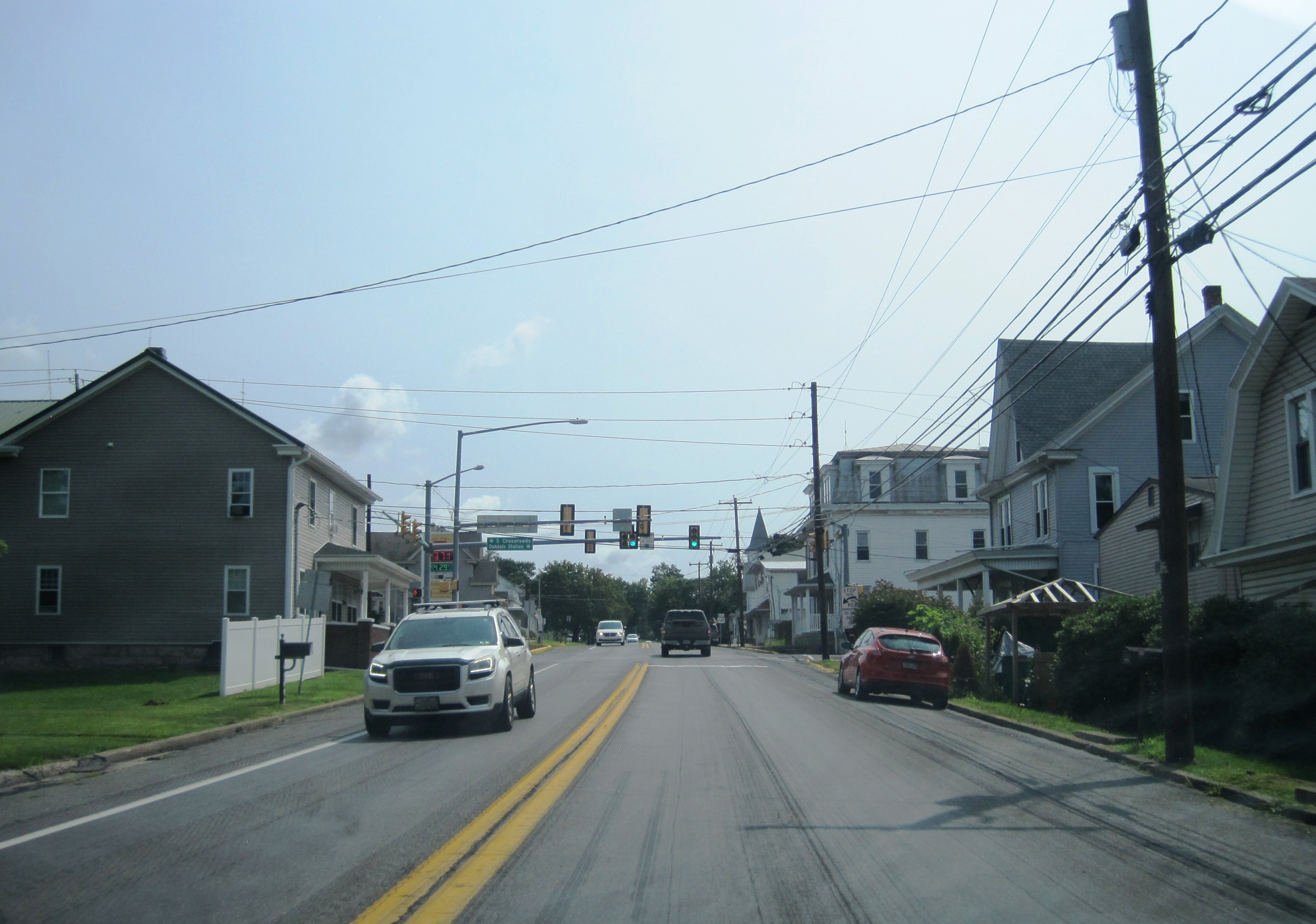
- Photo along US 209

- Location within Pennsylvania
- Coordinates: 40.569°N 76.762°W
- Country: United States
- State: Pennsylvania
- County: Dauphin
- Elevation: 577 ft (176 m)
- Time zone: UTC-5 (Eastern (EST))
  - Summer (DST): UTC-4 (EDT)
- Area code: 717
- GNIS feature ID: 1198290

Loyalton is an unincorporated community in Washington Township, Dauphin County, Pennsylvania, United States, and is a part of the Harrisburg-Carlisle Metropolitan Statistical Area. The latitude is 40.569, and the longitude -76.762; its elevation is 577 feet (176 m).
