= Jackson Township, Dauphin County, Pennsylvania =

Township in Pennsylvania, US

Coordinates: 40°31′00″N 76°52′59″W

- Township
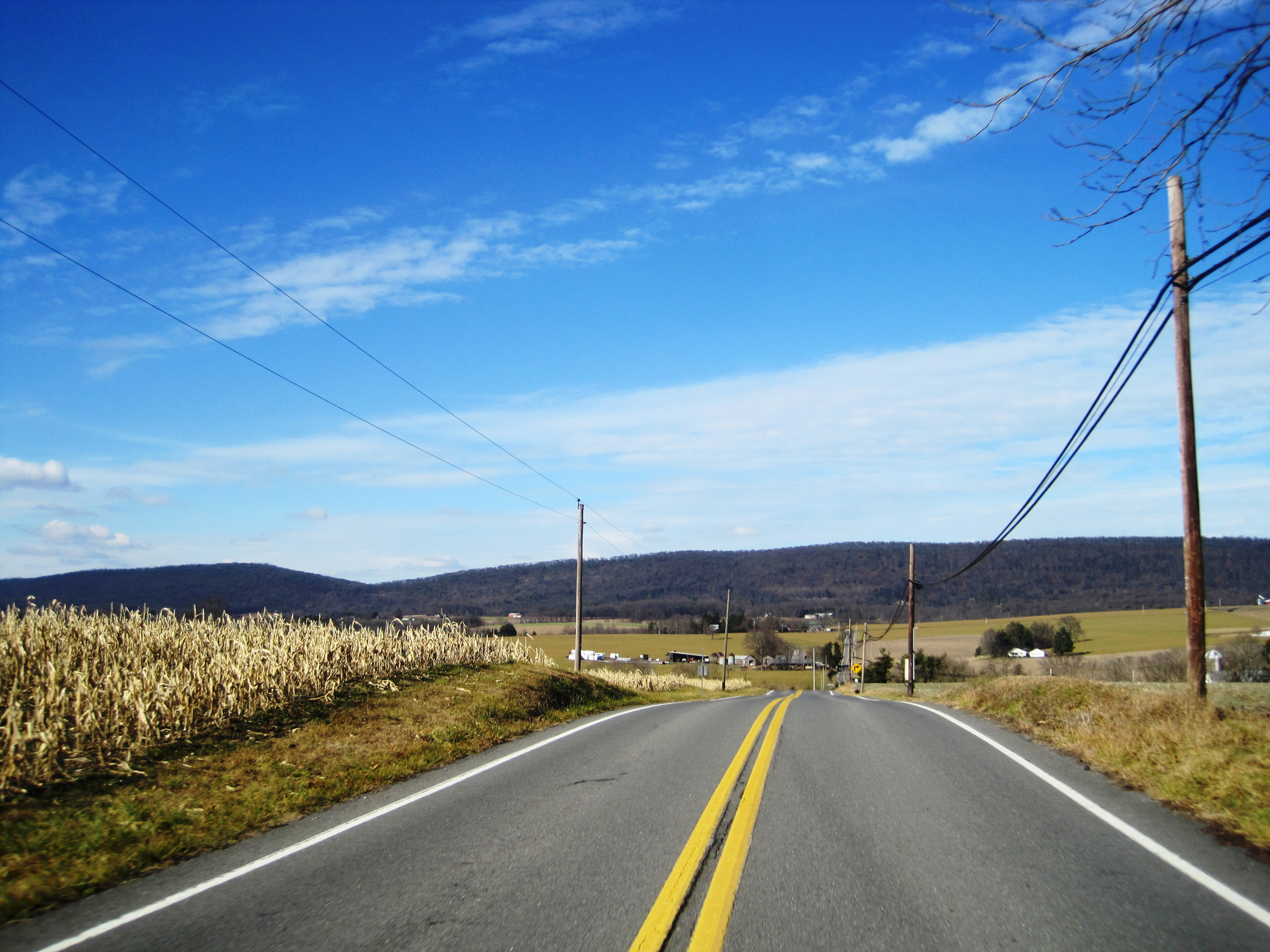
- Scenery of Jackson Township along Rutter Road

- Location in Dauphin County and state of Pennsylvania.
- Country: United States
- State: Pennsylvania
- County: Dauphin
- Incorporated: 1828

Government
  - Type: Board of Commissioners

Area
  - Total: 40.07 sq mi (103.77 km^{2})
  - Land: 40.07 sq mi (103.77 km^{2})
  - Water: 0 sq mi (0.00 km^{2})

Population (2020)
  - Total: 1,827 ▼
  - Estimate (2023): 1,832
  - Density: 49.3/sq mi (19.02/km^{2})
- Time zone: UTC-5 (Eastern (EST))
  - Summer (DST): UTC-4 (EDT)
- Area code: 717
- FIPS code: 42-043-37368
- Website: jacksontownship17032.com

Jackson Township is an American township that is located in Dauphin County, Pennsylvania. The population was 1,827 at the time of the 2020 census, a decline from the figure of 1,941 tabulated in 2010.

== History ==
Jackson Township was named for Andrew Jackson, the seventh president of the United States. The Shoop Site (36DA20) was listed on the National Register of Historic Places in 1986.

== Geography ==
Jackson Township is located in northern Dauphin County, in the Ridge and Valley region of the Appalachian Mountains. It is a long, narrow township, which extends east to west, with its northern border following the crest of Berry Mountain. The western half of the township is an agricultural area surrounding the valley of Armstrong Creek, while the eastern half is occupied by Berry Mountain and Broad Mountain, with some portions being part of Weiser State Forest.

The unincorporated communities of Fisherville, Enders, and Dietrich are located in the western half of the township.

According to the United States Census Bureau, the township has a total area of 40.1 square miles (103.8 km^{2}), all land.

== Demographics ==
Historical population
Census	Pop.	Note	%±
2000	1,728		—
2010	1,941		12.3%
2020	1,827		−5.9%
2023 (est.)	1,832		0.3%
U.S. Decennial Census

As of the census of 2000, there were 1,728 people, 652 households, and 537 families residing in the township. The population density was 44.4 inhabitants per square mile (17.1/km^{2}). There were 679 housing units at an average density of 17.4/sq mi (6.7/km^{2}). The racial makeup of the township was 98.15% White, 0.35% African American, 0.12% Native American, 0.06% Asian, 1.04% from other races, and 0.29% from two or more races. Hispanic or Latino of any race were 1.22% of the population.

There were 652 households, out of which 31.3% had children under the age of 18 living with them, 72.2% were married couples living together, 6.7% had a female householder with no husband present, and 17.6% were non-families. 14.3% of all households were made up of individuals, and 5.7% had someone living alone who was 65 years of age or older. The average household size was 2.64 and the average family size was 2.92.

In the township the population was spread out, with 21.4% under the age of 18, 8.4% from 18 to 24, 29.9% from 25 to 44, 29.3% from 45 to 64, and 11.1% who were 65 years of age or older. The median age was 40 years. For every 100 females, there were 97.9 males. For every 100 females age 18 and over, there were 96.7 males.

The median income for a household in the township was $47,330, and the median income for a family was $53,523. Males had a median income of $32,917 versus $25,032 for females. The per capita income for the township was $21,181. About 4.6% of families and 5.1% of the population were below the poverty line, including 5.1% of those under age 18 and 3.2% of those age 65 or over.
