= Powell Creek (Pennsylvania) =

River in Pennsylvania, United States

Coordinates: 40°24′37″N 76°59′04″W

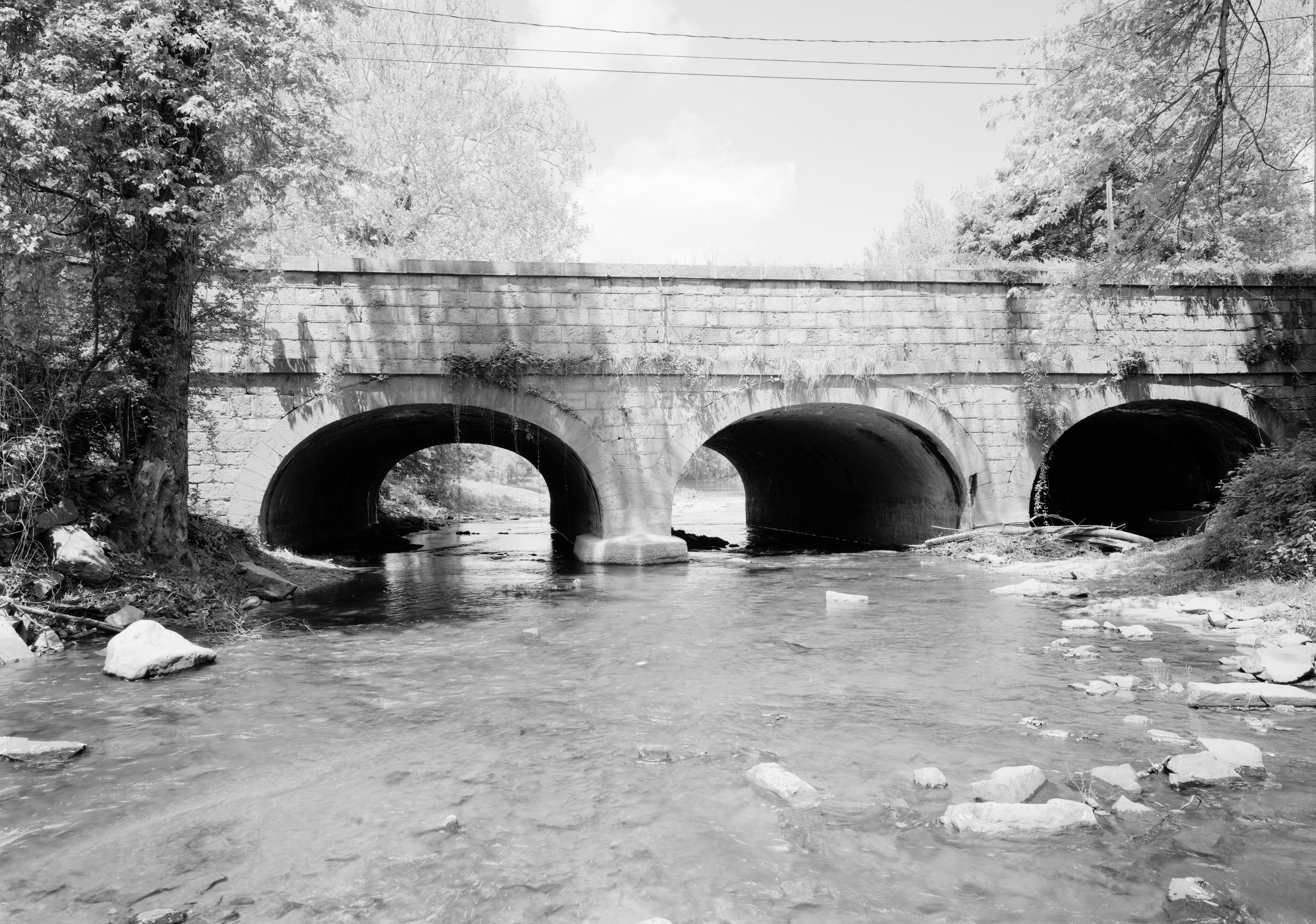
- Wiconisco Canal Aqueduct No. 3 over Powell Creek

Powell Creek (on federal maps since 2004: Powells Creek) is a 16.5-mile-long (26.6 km) tributary of the Susquehanna River in Dauphin County, Pennsylvania in the United States.

It is formed by the junction of its North and South forks southwest of Carsonville. The creek flows southwest along the northern side of Peters Mountain.

Powell Creek joins the Susquehanna River just upstream of the Clarks Ferry Bridge and the borough of Duncannon.

Powell Creek and nearby Powells Valley was named for the Powell family who settled near its banks in about 1760.

== See also ==
- List of rivers of Pennsylvania
