= Halifax Township, Pennsylvania =

Township in Pennsylvania, US

Coordinates: 40°31′00″N 76°54′59″W

- Township
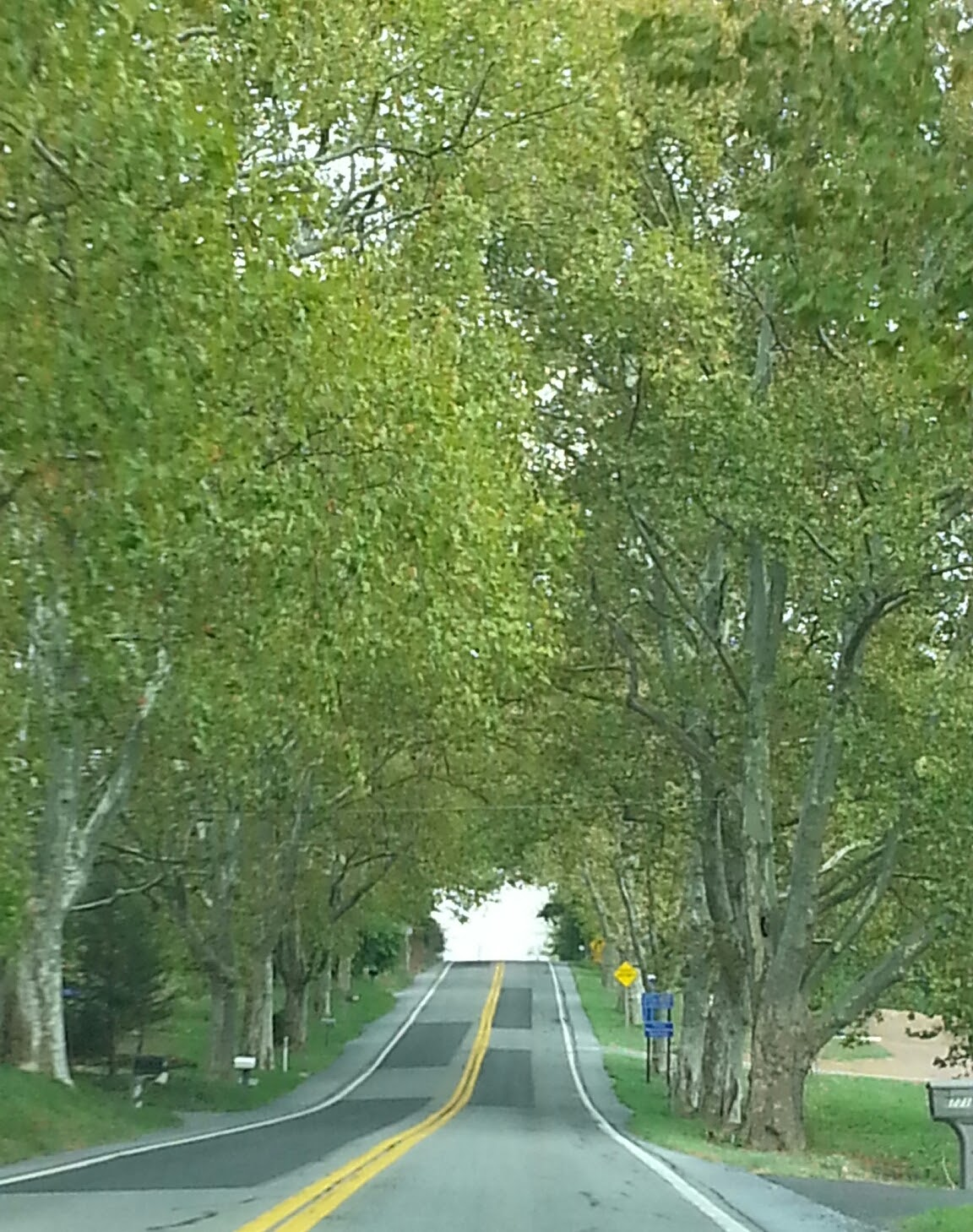
- Legislative Route 1 Sycamore Allee

- Location in Dauphin County and state of Pennsylvania.
- Country: United States
- State: Pennsylvania
- County: Dauphin
- Incorporated: 1804

Area
  - Total: 31.78 sq mi (82.32 km^{2})
  - Land: 27.65 sq mi (71.62 km^{2})
  - Water: 4.13 sq mi (10.70 km^{2})

Population (2020)
  - Total: 3,355 ▼
  - Estimate (2023): 3,326
  - Density: 127.8/sq mi (49.33/km^{2})
- Time zone: UTC-5 (Eastern (EST))
  - Summer (DST): UTC-4 (EDT)
- Area code: 717
- FIPS code: 42-043-32040
- Website: hfxtwppa.gov

Halifax Township is a township in Dauphin County, Pennsylvania, United States. The population was 3,355 at the 2020 census.

== History ==
Halifax Township takes its name from Fort Halifax on the Susquehanna River.

The Clemson Island Prehistoric District was listed on the National Register of Historic Places in 1981. The Legislative Route 1 Sycamore Allee was listed in 2007.

== Geography ==
Halifax Township is in northwestern Dauphin County and is bordered by the Susquehanna River to the northwest, Berry Mountain to the north, and Peters Mountain to the south. The borough of Halifax, a separate municipality, is near the center of the township. Unincorporated communities in the township include Powells Valley and Matamoras in the south.

According to the United States Census Bureau, the township has a total area of 31.8 square miles (82.3 km^{2}), of which 27.6 square miles (71.6 km^{2}) is land and 4.1 square miles (10.7 km^{2}), or 12.99%, is water. Most of the surface water in the township is part of the Susquehanna River, which averages 1 mile (1.6 km) wide in this area. Powell Creek crosses the southern part of the township, and Armstrong Creek crosses the center, flowing into the Susquehanna north of Halifax borough.

== Demographics ==
Historical population
Census	Pop.	Note	%±
2010	3,483		—
2020	3,355		−3.7%
2023 (est.)	3,326		−0.9%
U.S. Decennial Census

As of the census of 2000, there were 3,329 people, 1,261 households, and 978 families residing in the township. The population density was 119.3 inhabitants per square mile (46.1/km^{2}). There were 1,327 housing units at an average density of 47.5 per square mile (18.3/km^{2}). The racial makeup of the township was 98.35% White, 0.33% African American, 0.54% Asian, 0.27% from other races, and 0.51% from two or more races. Hispanic or Latino of any race were 0.51% of the population.

There were 1,261 households, out of which 35.2% had children under the age of 18 living with them, 66.0% were married couples living together, 7.1% had a female householder with no husband present, and 22.4% were non-families. 18.1% of all households were made up of individuals, and 8.8% had someone living alone who was 65 years of age or older. The average household size was 2.64 and the average family size was 2.97.

In the township the population was spread out, with 26.1% under the age of 18, 5.6% from 18 to 24, 29.8% from 25 to 44, 25.8% from 45 to 64, and 12.7% who were 65 years of age or older. The median age was 39 years. For every 100 females, there were 97.4 males. For every 100 females age 18 and over, there were 95.0 males.

The median income for a household in the township was $45,913, and the median income for a family was $50,568. Males had a median income of $35,594 versus $28,716 for females. The per capita income for the township was $19,749. About 6.8% of families and 8.9% of the population were below the poverty line, including 13.3% of those under age 18 and 5.3% of those age 65 or over.
