= Fort Hunter =

Fort Hunter may refer to:

- Fort Hunter Liggett, a United States Army base in Jolon, California, United States
- Fort Hunter, Albany County, New York, a hamlet in Guilderland, Albany County, New York, United States
- Fort Hunter, New York, a hamlet in the town of Florida, Montgomery County, New York, United States
- Fort Hunter, also known as Tiononderoge, an 18th-century British fort built in 1712 at the Schoharie Crossing State Historic Site in Florida, Montgomery County, New York, United States
- Fort Hunter, Pennsylvania, an unincorporated community in Dauphin County, Pennsylvania, United States
- Fort Hunter (Pennsylvania), a French and Indian War fortress in Dauphin County, Pennsylvania, United States
- Fort Hunter Historic District, a national Historic district located in Dauphin County, Pennsylvania, United States
- Fort Hunter Mansion, also known as the Archibald McAllister House, a historic home located in Dauphin County, Pennsylvania
