= Pennsylvania Route 325 =

State highway in Pennsylvania, US

Pennsylvania Route 325

Route information
- Maintained by PennDOT
- Length: 30.311 mi (48.781 km)

Major junctions
- West end: Mountain Road & Earl Drive in Speeceville, Middle Paxton Township
- US 22 / US 322 in Middle Paxton Township; PA 225 near Dauphin
- East end: US 209 in Tower City

Location
- Country: United States
- State: Pennsylvania
- Counties: Dauphin, Schuylkill

Highway system
- Pennsylvania State Route System; Interstate; US; State; Scenic; Legislative
← PA 324	→ PA 326

Pennsylvania Route 325 (PA 325) is a 30-mile-long (48 km) state highway located in Dauphin and Schuylkill counties in Pennsylvania. The western terminus is at the intersection of Mountain Road and Earl Drive, just past an interchange with U.S. Route 22 (US 22)/US 322, in the community of Speeceville in Middle Paxton Township. The eastern terminus is at US 209 in Tower City. PA 325 runs through a narrow valley for its length, passing through forested areas with some farmland. The route forms a concurrency with PA 225 to the north of Dauphin. The road was paved in stages between 1930 and the 1940s. PA 325 was designated in the 1940s to run between US 22/US 322/PA 14 in Speeceville east to US 209 in Tower City. In 1999, an interchange with US 22/US 322 was constructed near the western terminus; the end of PA 325 remained at Riverview Road, the former alignment of US 22/US 322.

== Route description ==
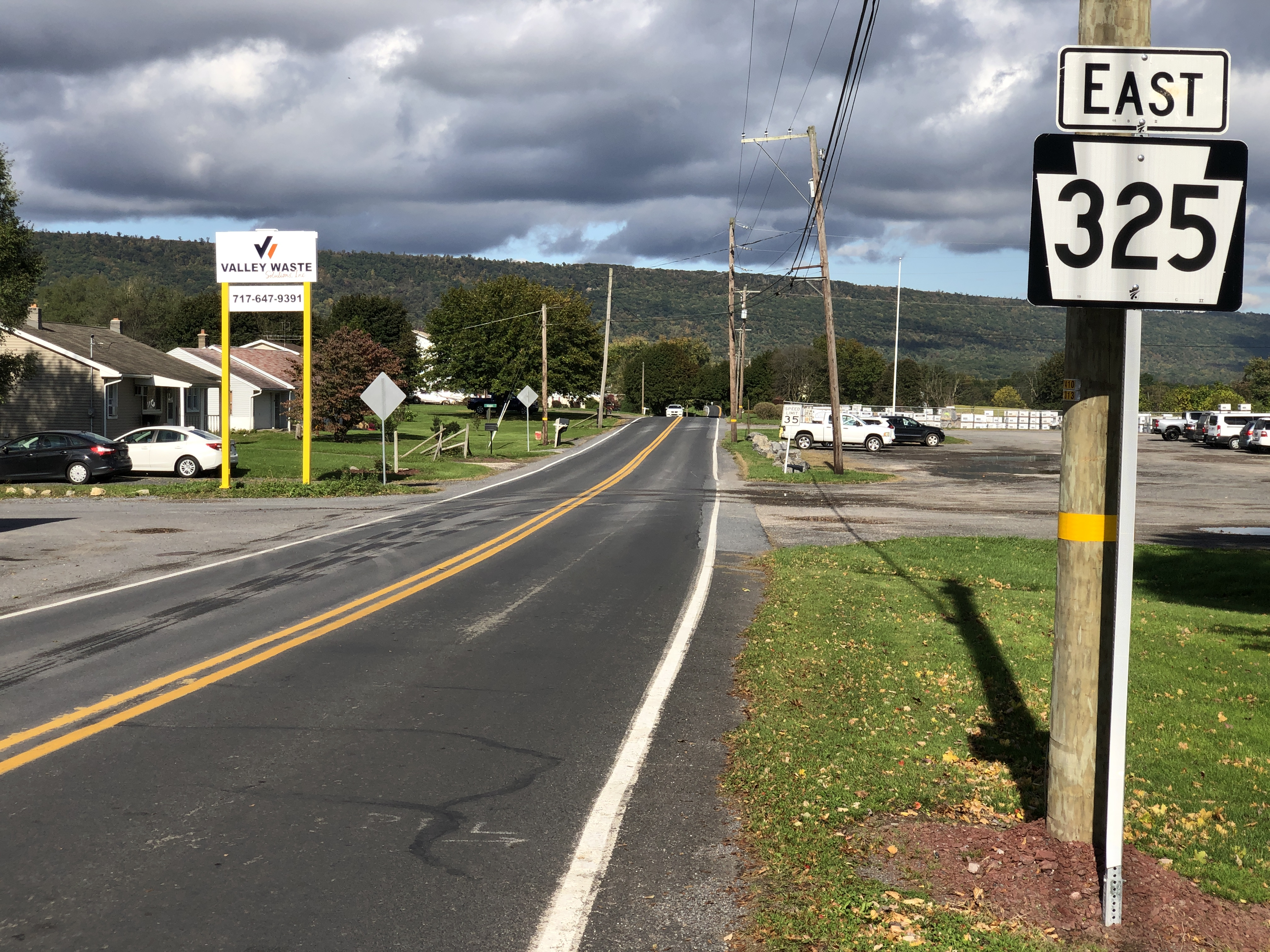
PA 325 eastbound in Porter Township

PA 325 begins at the intersection of Mountain Road and Earl Drive in the community of Speeceville in Middle Paxton Township, Dauphin County, heading east-northeast on two-lane undivided Mountain Road. Immediately after beginning, the route has a diamond interchange with the US 22/US 322 freeway. The road runs through wooded areas with some homes and fields, running along the southern base of Peters Mountain. PA 325 comes to an intersection with PA 225, turning south-southeast to form a concurrency with that route on Peters Mountain Road. The road passes through agricultural areas before heading into woods, with PA 325 splitting from PA 225 by heading east on Clarks Valley Road. The route heads through forested areas, curving northeast before heading north-northeast into a narrow agricultural valley with some homes, paralleling Clark Creek. Farther east, the road heads into more dense forests, running between Peters Mountain to the north and Stony Mountain to the south. PA 325 continues into Rush Township and crosses the Appalachian Trail. The route passes along the northern shore of the DeHart Reservoir prior to continuing northeast through more forests. The road heads into another narrow agricultural valley with some homes and passes to the northwest of Bendigo Airport. The route crosses into Porter Township in Schuylkill County and turns north through more farmland with a few woods and residences. PA 325 heads into the borough of Tower City and becomes 10th Street, passing homes before ending at US 209.

== History ==
When Pennsylvania first legislated routes in 1911, present-day PA 325 was not given a number. By 1930, the current alignment of the route was an unnumbered road between north of Dauphin and Tower City, with the western section of the road paved. In the 1930s, a section of the road west of Tower City was paved while a section leading east to the Clark Valley Dam was upgraded to an improved road. PA 325 was designated in the 1940s to run from an intersection with US 22/US 322/PA 14 in Speeceville east to US 209 in Tower City. At this time, the entire length of the route was paved. US 22/US 322 was upgraded to a freeway at the western terminus of PA 325 in 1999, with an interchange constructed. The western terminus of PA 325 remained at the former alignment of US 22/US 322 at Riverview Road.

== Major intersections ==
County	Location	mi	km	Destinations	Notes
Dauphin	Middle Paxton Township	0.000	0.000	Mountain Road & Earl Drive	Western terminus
Dauphin	Middle Paxton Township	0.036– 0.045	0.058– 0.072	US 22 / US 322 – Harrisburg, Lewistown	Interchange
Dauphin	Middle Paxton Township	3.409	5.486	PA 225 north (Peters Mountain Road) – Halifax	West end of PA 225 concurrency
Dauphin	Middle Paxton Township	4.140	6.663	PA 225 south (Peters Mountain Road) – Dauphin	East end of PA 225 concurrency
Schuylkill	Tower City	30.311	48.781	US 209 (Grand Avenue) – Millersburg, Tremont	Eastern terminus
1.000 mi = 1.609 km; 1.000 km = 0.621 mi: Concurrency terminus
