= Fort Hunter (Pennsylvania) =

18th century fort in colonial Pennsylvania

- Dauphin County, Pennsylvania (near Middle Paxton Township, Pennsylvania)
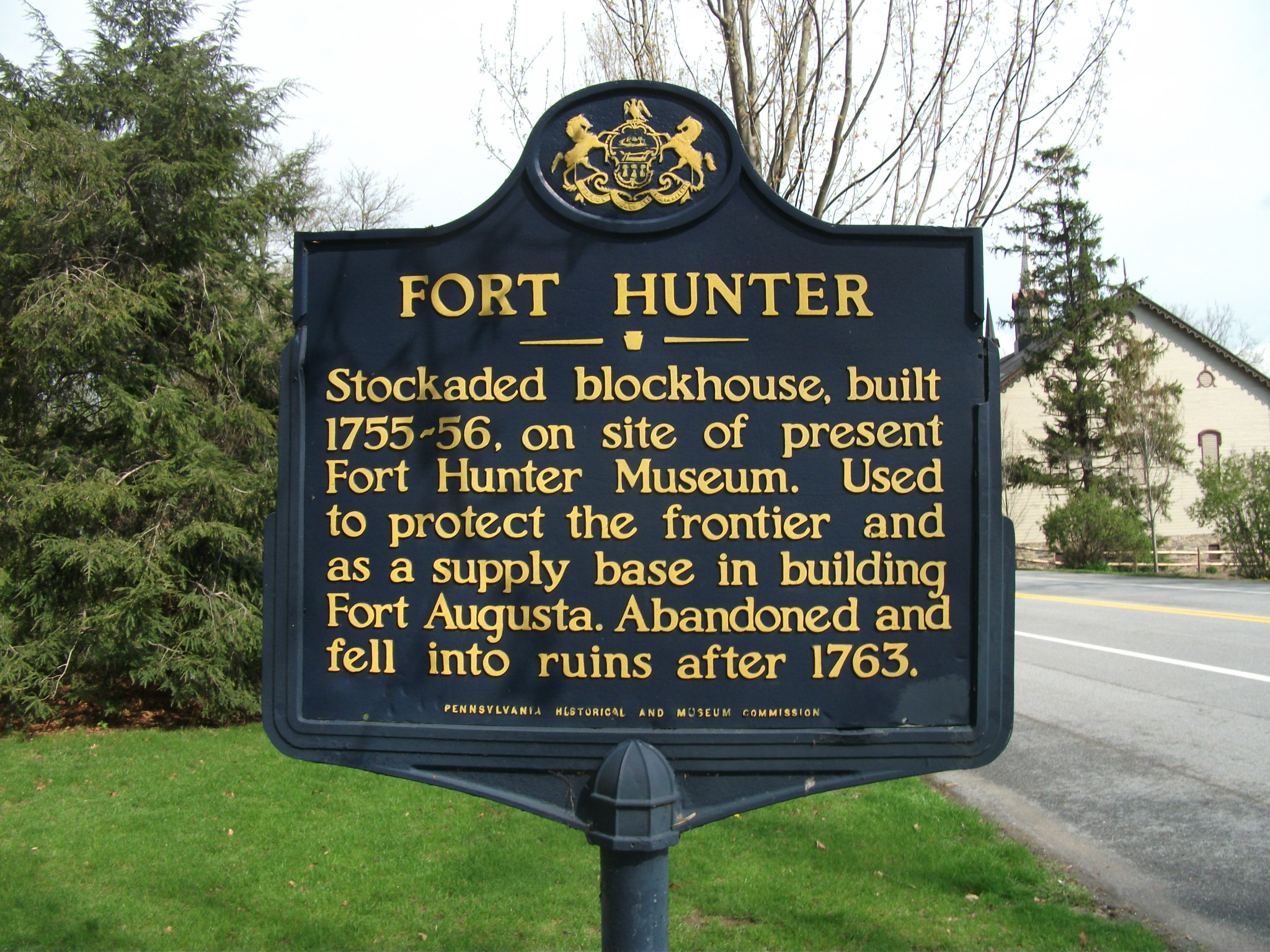
- Historical marker on the site of Fort Hunter.

Site information
- Type: Military fort
- Controlled by: Dauphin County Parks and Recreation Department

Location
- Location of Fort Hunter in Pennsylvania
- Coordinates: 40°20′46″N 76°54′43″W

Site history
- Built: 1755
- In use: 1755-1763
- Battles/wars: French and Indian War; Pontiac's War

Garrison information
- Past commanders: Samuel Hunter; Captain Thomas McKee; Captain Read; Captain Johnson; Ensign John Mears; Ensign Jacob Kern; Ensign George Price; Captain James Patterson
- Garrison: 25-108 men plus officers

Pennsylvania Historical Marker
- Designated: 1947

Fort Hunter was a military fort located in present-day Fort Hunter, Pennsylvania. It was initially a stockaded gristmill fortified by Samuel Hunter in 1755 and later enlarged and maintained by the Province of Pennsylvania during the French and Indian War. Fort Hunter was part of a defensive line of forts built in Pennsylvania during 1755 and 1756, at the start of hostilities with the French and their allied Native Americans. It was briefly used during Pontiac's War, then abandoned in 1763.

== History ==
=== Hunter's Mill ===
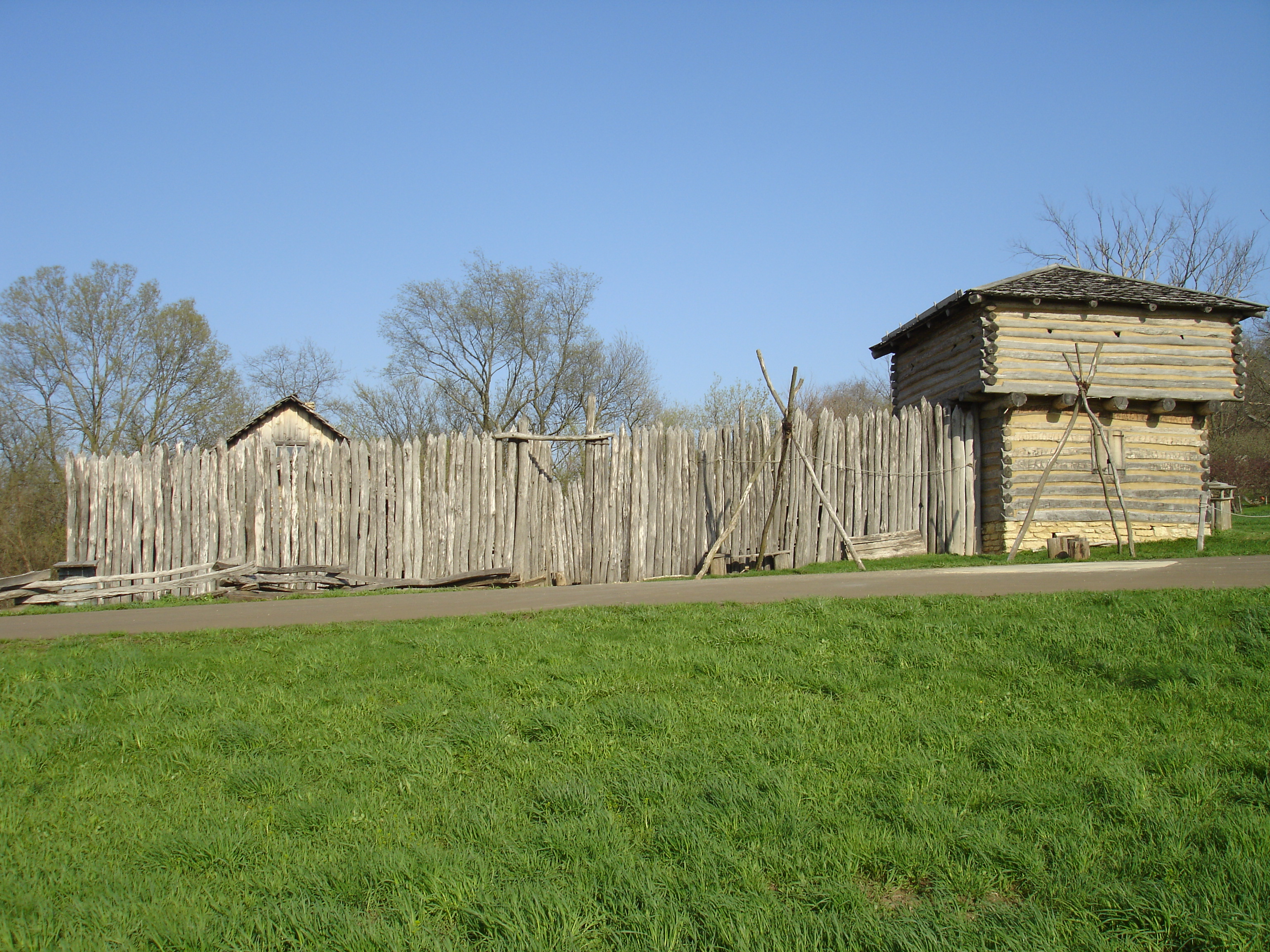
Reconstructed stockade and blockhouse similar to the original Fort Hunter.

Fort Hunter was initially a stockaded gristmill in the Great Valley, owned by Samuel Hunter who lived on Fishing Creek. The mill was located about six miles north of Harris' Ferry, probably five hundred feet west of the mouth of Fishing Creek, near its confluence with the Susquehanna River, in present-day Dauphin County. In response to the Penn's Creek Massacre in October 1755, the government of the Province of Pennsylvania decided to fortify Hunter's Mill, and in January 1756, it was fortified with a simple stockade and garrisoned with volunteer militia recruited by Thomas McKee, an Indian trader who operated a trading post nearby. McKee was appointed captain of "McKee's Volunteers," but provisions, clothing and ammunition were in short supply, and the post was vulnerable to attack. On 10 January, Governor Robert Hunter Morris ordered 25 men to be sent from Carlisle to reinforce McKee's garrison, and "to deliver to Cap't McKee such Provincial arms, accouterments, blankets, tools and stores as he may at any time have received."

=== Construction ===
In March 1756, Benjamin Franklin commissioned Colonel William Clapham to construct forts in a defensive line in central Pennsylvania, to defend against French and Native American attacks on settlements that were becoming more frequent as part of the French and Indian War. On 7 April 1756, Governor Morris ordered Clapham to march his regiment to Hunter's Mill to begin construction. On 11 May 1756, McKee handed over command of the fort to Colonel Clapham.

Colonel Clapham chose to build Fort Hunter about 500 yards east of the mill, near the Susquehanna River, which the army was using to transport troops and supplies. Fort Hunter, like other forts near the river, was intended to monitor river traffic to prevent war parties from approaching the settlements. The fort probably consisted of a block house surrounded by a stockade and a defensive ditch. There are references in historic documents to a stockade, to "a magazine of provisions and other warlike stores," and to the construction (in January, 1757) of "a Room for the Officers & Barracks for the Soldiers...in Hunters Fort." It was described as having "a commanding view of the river." Fort Halifax was 160 feet wide with bastions, so Fort Hunter was likely similar in construction, but no drawings or plans exist. In July 1758 General John Forbes ordered the stockade repaired and the defensive ditch surrounding the fort to be enlarged.

=== Garrison and command ===
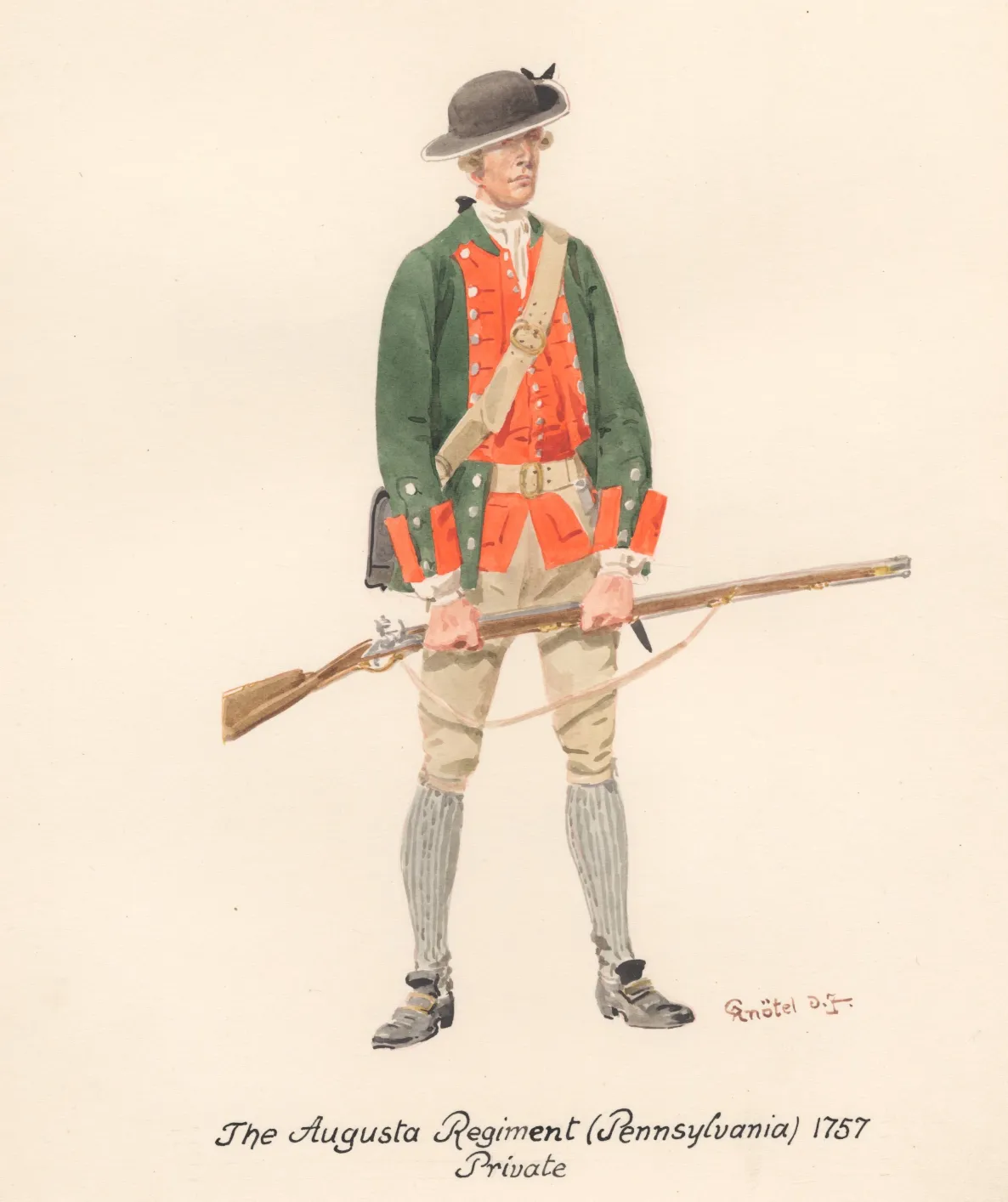
Illustration of an Augusta Regiment private in 1757. The regiment was the first provincial unit raised in Pennsylvania and participated in the construction of Fort Augusta, Fort Hunter, and Fort Halifax.

As of 10 January 1756, the garrison had only 25 men, but by 13 November, it consisted of two sergeants and 34 privates from the Augusta Regiment. In November 1756, Colonel Clapham ordered the interim commander of Fort Hunter, Ensign John Mears, to furnish fifteen men to escort the wagon master Robert Erwin to Fort Halifax. Mears informed Erwin that "Col. Clapham had no Command of him nor of his men: that he shou'd not pay any Regard to these Orders of Colonel Clapham's or the Governour's, for how cou'd the Governor give him the Command of that Fort and yet Command it himself." Clapham had Mears arrested and sent Ensign Jacob Kerns to replace him.

In March 1757, Governor William Denny met with Lord Loudoun, Conrad Weiser, and Colonel Clapham and determined that Fort Hunter should be demolished. Its garrison and supplies were to be divided between Fort Augusta and Fort Halifax. In July and August, settlers in the area protested that removing the fort would put their homes in danger, and after several months of consideration, the governor instead decided to demolish Fort Halifax and transfer its garrison to Fort Hunter. A company of 50 men was assigned to range the country between Fort Hunter and Manada Gap, to prevent Native American war parties from moving into the area. In February 1758, the garrison was strengthened to 80 men, and by July 1758 consisted of two companies with a total of 108 men and officers.

Following the end of hostilities after the 1758 Treaty of Easton, the garrison was transferred and the fort was used only for storage until 1763.

=== Pontiac's War ===
1759 map of the Province of Pennsylvania showing Fort Hunter on the east bank of the Susquehanna River, below and to the left of the map's center.

Fort Hunter was put to temporary use during Pontiac's War in June 1763, when it served as a supply depot and a recruiting station. Joseph Shippen Jr., secretary to Governor James Hamilton, was posted there briefly to supervise the recruitment of 700 troops for the defense of the province, and the gathering and transfer of supplies to be sent upriver to Fort Augusta. The fort was still occupied in October 1763, when the Reverend John Elder informed Governor Hamilton that the defensive ditch surrounding the fort had been filled in, and that he had "alwise kept a small party of the men stationed at Hunter's."

== Abandonment, 1763 ==
The fort was abandoned after the end of Pontiac's War and fell into ruins. The community of Fort Hunter, Pennsylvania was established nearby after 1787. The property was purchased in 1787 by Archibald McAllister, who built his home there. It still stands and is known as the Archibald McAllister House.

In 1796, François Alexandre Frédéric de La Rochefoucauld wrote in his journal that he had seen the ruins of Fort Hunter while travelling by boat up the Susquehanna River. In 1814 McAllister built a storehouse on the site of the fort.

== Archaeology ==
Starting in 2006, archaeological excavations began, initially to try to locate the fort. A stone-lined well was discovered in 2008, and this may have been the fort's source of fresh water. In 2018 the dig uncovered a cannonball, musket balls, chunks of iron, crucible pieces, metals for blacksmithing and gun-smithing, spear points, grinding stones, Indian pottery and dishware, and the nearly complete lock from a Brown Bess musket. A trash midden yielded gunflints, broken glass, glazed ceramics, and white clay pipe fragments. A cluster of artifacts and building materials located in 2019 was identified as part of the fort, and by 2020 some 6,688 artifacts had been recovered, including a large fragment of a Delft bowl base, as well as a tinderbox, trade beads, a thimble with pins, a pile of small caliber lead shot, and a pair of pewter and green glass cuff buttons, still connected by a tiny brass loop after 250 years in the ground. Mapping the locations of these artifacts revealed the likely location of the fort, part of which lies under the Archibald McAllister House.

Excavations have also uncovered numerous Native American artifacts, dating mainly to the Archaic and Middle Woodland periods, between nine thousand and fifteen hundred years ago. These consisted of stone tools, spear points, cord-marked pottery, and large cooking hearths.

== Memorialization ==
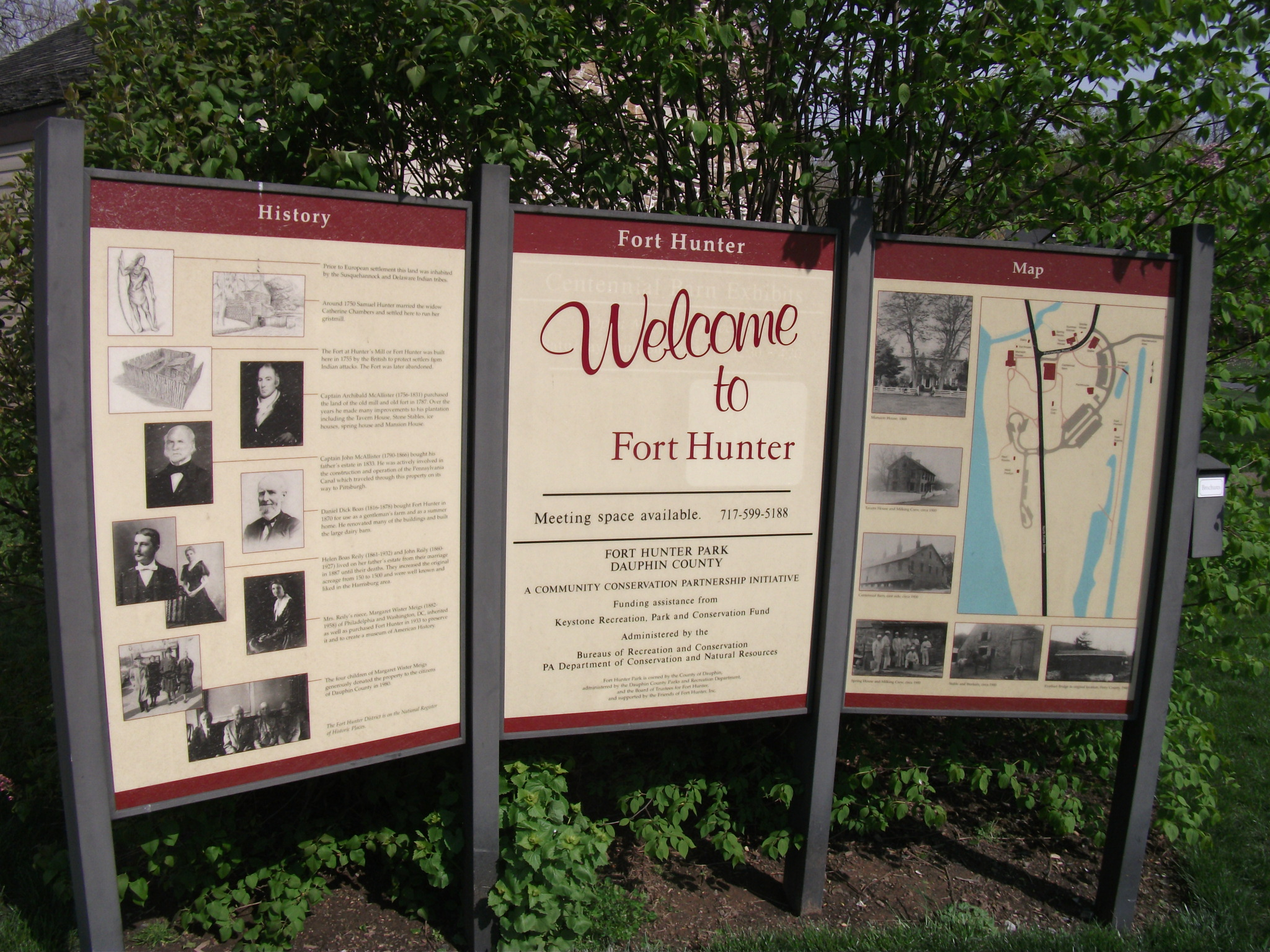
Informational history board at Fort Hunter Park.

A historical marker was erected in 1947 by the Pennsylvania Historical and Museum Commission at the intersection of North Front Street and Fort Hunter Road. An informational history board can be seen at the Fort Hunter Historic District at Fort Hunter Park in Fort Hunter, Pennsylvania.

== See also ==
- French and Indian War
- William Clapham
- Fort Augusta
- Pontiac's War
- Pennsylvania forts in the French and Indian War
