= Rush Township, Pennsylvania =

Rush Township is the name of some places in the U.S. state of Pennsylvania:

- Rush Township, Centre County, Pennsylvania
- Rush Township, Dauphin County, Pennsylvania
- Rush Township, Northumberland County, Pennsylvania
- Rush Township, Schuylkill County, Pennsylvania
- Rush Township, Susquehanna County, Pennsylvania
