= Dauphin, Pennsylvania =

Borough in Pennsylvania, US

- Borough
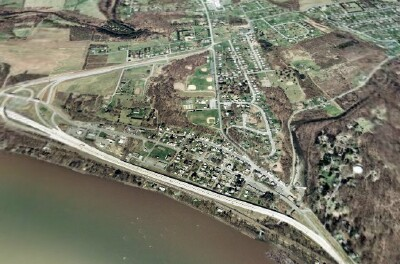
- An aerial view of Dauphin

- Location in Dauphin County and the U.S. state of Pennsylvania.

- Location in Pennsylvania and the United States Dauphin (the United States)
- Coordinates: 40°22′00″N 76°55′52″W
- Country: United States
- State: Pennsylvania
- County: Dauphin
- Settled: 1765
- Incorporated: 1845

Government
  - Type: Borough Council
  - Mayor: Terry Searight (R)
  - Councilors: List: Trudy Koppenhaver (R); John Windish (R); Joseph Wynn (R); Diane Price (R); Derek Stence (R); David Koppenhaver (R); Stephen Bomgardner (R)
  - Secretary: Michelle McBurney
  - Treasurer: Tracy Klinger
  - Tax Collector: Virginia Wynn

Area
  - Total: 0.43 sq mi (1.12 km^{2})
  - Land: 0.43 sq mi (1.11 km^{2})
  - Water: 0.0039 sq mi (0.01 km^{2})
- Elevation: 427 ft (130 m)

Population (2020)
  - Total: 795
  - Density: 1,858/sq mi (717.2/km^{2})
- Time zone: UTC-5 (Eastern (EST))
  - Summer (DST): UTC-4 (EDT)
- ZIP Code: 17018
- Area code: 717
- FIPS code: 42-18272
- Website: https://dauphinborough.org/

Dauphin is a borough in Dauphin County, Pennsylvania, United States. The population was 796 at the 2020 census. Dauphin's ZIP code is 17018. It is part of the Harrisburg metropolitan area.

== Geography ==
Dauphin is located on the western edge of Dauphin County at 40°22′00″N 76°55′52″W, on the east bank of the Susquehanna River. The land at the river's edge is alluvial floodplain, but Dauphin sits at the head of a narrow valley between two mountains, at the mouth of Stony Creek. The valley between the two mountains is called Stony Valley, which contains the villages of Singersville and Ellendale Forge. This section along the Susquehanna River is a gateway from the southeastern plains into the Appalachian Mountains and the north-central part of the state. Berrier Island is also located at Dauphin.

Dauphin is surrounded by Middle Paxton Township, which comprises mountains and valleys south of the confluence of the Susquehanna and Juniata rivers. From south to north, the mountains in the township are Blue Mountain, Second Mountain, Third or Stony Mountain, and Peters Mountain. The eastern ends of these valleys are generally undeveloped state game lands and protected watershed.

U.S. Routes 22 and 322 pass through the borough as a four-lane expressway, close to the Susquehanna River, with full access from Pennsylvania Route 225 at the west end of town and with westbound access from the east end of town. US 22/322 leads south 8 miles (13 km) to the center of Harrisburg and northwest 7 miles (11 km) to Duncannon. PA 225 leads north over Peters Mountain 9 miles (14 km) to Halifax.

According to the U.S. Census Bureau, the borough has a total area of 0.42 square miles (1.1 km^{2}), of which 0.004 square miles (0.01 km^{2}), or 1.16%, is water.

== Demographics ==
Historical population
Census	Pop.	Note	%±
1850	650		—
1860	680		4.6%
1870	739		8.7%
1880	713		−3.5%
1890	740		3.8%
1900	566		−23.5%
1910	545		−3.7%
1920	598		9.7%
1930	600		0.3%
1940	620		3.3%
1950	667		7.6%
1960	638		−4.3%
1970	998		56.4%
1980	901		−9.7%
1990	845		−6.2%
2000	773		−8.5%
2010	791		2.3%
2020	795		0.5%
2021 (est.)	795	Steady	0.0%

As of the census of 2010, there were 791 people, 302 households, and 217 families residing in the borough. The population density was 1,788.6 inhabitants per square mile (690.6/km^{2}). There were 337 housing units at an average density of 762.0 per square mile (294.2/km^{2}). The racial makeup of the borough was 97.35% White, 0.76% African-American, 0.51% Asian, 0.38% from other races, and 1.01% from two or more races. Hispanic or Latino of any race were 1.39% of the population. 10% claimed German ancestry, 8% Irish, 8% English, and 35% considered themselves "American."

As of 2009, there were 302 households (263 occupied, 39 vacant), out of which 29.8% had children under the age of 18 living with them, 55.1% were married couples living together, 13.4% had a female householder with no husband present, and 28.2% were non-families. 23.6% of all households were made up of individuals, and 8.9% had someone living alone who was 65 years of age or older. Of 15 unmarried partner households, 3 households were listed as male householder with male partner, while there were no female householder/female partner listed. The average household size was 2.53 and the average family size was 2.99.

In the borough the population was spread out, with 24.5% under the age of 18, 6.9% from 18 to 24, 28.8% from 25 to 44, 26.1% from 45 to 64, and 13.7% who were 65 years of age or older. The median age was 39 years. For every 100 females, there were 97.2 males. For every 100 females age 18 and over, there were 89.6 males.

The median income for a household in the borough was $44,219, and the median income for a family was $50,125. Males had a median income of $31,250 versus $25,865 for females. The per capita income for the borough was $19,227. About 5.1% of families and 6.5% of the population were below the poverty line, including 4.9% of those under age 18 and 16.3% of those age 65 or over.

== Education ==
Children in the borough attend public school in the Central Dauphin School District (Middle Paxton Elementary, Central Dauphin Middle School, Central Dauphin High School). The nearest parochial elementary school is St. Margaret Mary School in Harrisburg.

Adults in Dauphin Borough have a variety of educational achievement. 46% of adults over 25 years of age have completed high school (including equivalency). 7.6% hold an associate degree; 11% a bachelor's degree; 2.9% a master's degree; 0.4% a professional degree; and 0.4% a doctorate.

== History ==
Dauphin borough began as a settlement at the mouth of Stony Creek, the head of a valley between Second and Third Mountains. It was established by Samuel Sturgeon in 1765. By the end of the eighteenth century, the Sturgeon property was owned by Revolutionary War soldier Timothy Green. The locality became known as Green's Mill, after the grist mill Colonel Green built at the mouth of the creek. According to local history, the area was also known for its colonial-period fort, alternately called Fort Lyon or Fort McKee. Colonel Green continued to hold highly valued real estate until his death in 1812. By 1814, his plantation property with its mills became part of his son Judge Innis Green's holdings. Judge Green continued to add to his real estate holdings throughout the early nineteenth century. The borough also took the name, Greensburg, after a post office.

Early road map showing Dauphin Borough and surrounding mountains

The surrounding township is called Middle Paxton, part of the former Paxton Township of Lancaster County prior to the creation of Dauphin County in 1785. Middle Paxton Township was incorporated in 1787. The main geographic feature of this area are ancient hills or mountains and narrow valleys that generally run east to west with streams emptying into the Susquehanna River. The township remained rural until the twentieth century.

Judge Green laid out Dauphin as Port Lyon in recognition of the former fort in 1826. Green named the Port Lyon streets after Pennsylvania rivers and creeks. Opportunities for economic expansion for the area appeared bright that year, as legislation was passed for creation of the Pennsylvania Canal. This fostered expectations that Dauphin would become a port to the coalfields lying to the northeast. Green acted on behalf of the Dauphin & Susquehanna (D & S) Coal Company, which had purchased eighteen tracts of land on or near Little Mountain, totaling about 7,000 acres (28 km^{2}), from a group of businessmen. Charles Bird had earlier that year purchased four tracts of land in Middle Paxton Township from Judge Green. Bird's interest was purchased by a group of businessmen who then sold to the D & S Coal Company. Green received the last payment on the agreement price of US $10,000.00 in 1835.

Business directory map of Dauphin Borough in 1862

Dauphin was incorporated into a borough by an act of Assembly in 1845. According to the 1850 census, Dauphin had 650 inhabitants at that time. There were 124 families in 118 dwellings. The 1860 census for the borough illustrated the working-class nature of the people living there. The borough had 649 inhabitants in 129 households, nearly the same as recorded in 1850. Fifty-five of the men listed their occupation as "day laborer". The 1870 census showed a marked change in the occupation of Dauphin's residents. Jobs related to the canal had dropped dramatically, while those associated with the railroads had increased substantially. At this time there were 151 households living in 148 dwellings. The borough's population had increased to 742. By 1875, the borough contained four churches, three schools and one select school, and two lodges. The 1880 census showed 155 families living in 146 dwellings in Dauphin.

View of Dauphin Borough, c. 1910

In the early twentieth century, several "summer" houses were constructed on the edge of Second Mountain, south of Stony Creek. Middle-class residents of Harrisburg built these houses as second homes to supplement their primary townhouses. These houses are collectively called "Hillside" and have since become year-round homes.

The borough, situated along the Susquehanna River, has always been associated with transportation. Original Native American trails would have followed waterways such as the river and Stony Creek. Development of the canal system of transporting goods during the early nineteenth century gave way to the rise of the railroads, which lasted for much of the twentieth. U.S. Route 22 became a major highway through Pennsylvania during the mid-twentieth century, parts of which were actually constructed within the footprint of the former Pennsylvania Canal. Dauphin thus developed as an early transportation hub, but in more recent decades has been bypassed by more significant routes of transport, such as the Eisenhower Interstate Highway System.

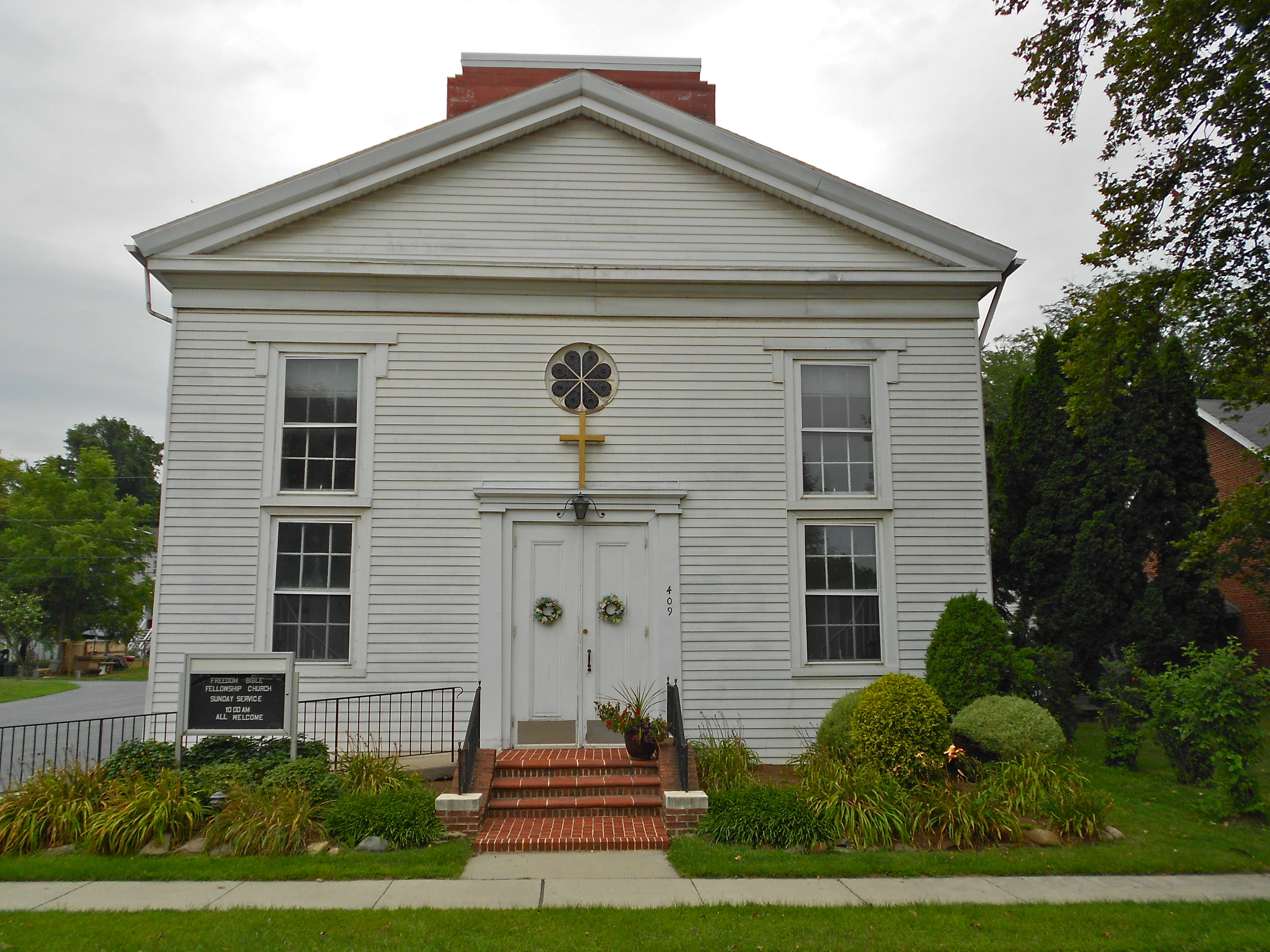
Freedom Bible Church

In the last forty or so years, Dauphin Borough has been a bedroom community of Harrisburg, the Pennsylvania state capital. Many of its civic centers had gone into steep decline, industry migrated elsewhere, taverns and hotels closed, as did schools and churches. The railroad, which declined during the late twentieth century, has been reduced to two tracks paralleling the river, with no stops or stations in Dauphin. One of the reasons for the decline was that as traffic on U.S. Rte. 22 increased, the borough became less desirable as a place in which to reside. By the 1980s, traffic on Rte. 22 was so heavy that the road essentially cut the borough in half. Residents often had such a difficult time traveling across the borough that they waited until after morning and evening rush hours. On weekends when the Pennsylvania State University in State College, some 90 miles (140 km) upstate, held football games, Rte. 22 through the borough was impassable.

In older times, Dauphin was the hub of a collection of small village centers in Middle Paxton Township of Dauphin County. Some of these settlements included Singersville, just east of the borough; Ellendale Forge, 2 miles (3 km) up Stony Creek Valley; Dauphin Furnace, 1 mile (1.6 km) west of town at the mouth of Clark Creek; Speeceville, 4 miles (6 km) west of town at the foot of Peters Mountain; and Heckton Mills, south of Second Mountain about a mile downriver from Dauphin. Much of the eastern part of the township, between Peters Mountain and Second Mountain, is forested and preserved as State Game Lands.

Most of these village centers have ceased to exist as the western part of Middle Paxton Township became suburbanized. The nearest organized towns to Dauphin are Duncannon, a borough on the western shore of the river; Halifax, a borough north of Peters Mountain; and Harrisburg, the state capital to the south.

In the late 1990s, following many years of planning and several postponements, Dauphin Borough was bypassed. A construction project that had caused much controversy resulted in relocating U.S. Rte. 22 closer to the river and out of, or over, Dauphin Borough. Approximately 28% of the borough's taxable real estate was taken in order to construct the bypass. The remaining town, free of the traffic problems, became once again desirable as a location for commuters to Harrisburg. Some of the last remaining open land in the borough was developed as residential space, and older structures in the borough were increasingly bought and renovated by commuters. Despite the losses in tax revenues owing to construction of the bypass, the local government continues to operate through cost-saving, cooperative efforts with Middle Paxton Township. Sewer system connections were extended to borough residents in Hillside and along River Road as part of a collection system and pump station upgrade. In 2011, the Dauphin/Middle Paxton Fire Company relocated its apparatus from the borough to a new government building housing Middle Paxton Township offices and Public Safety. The local ambulance association became dormant, and Susquehanna Township E.M.S. began covering medical emergencies in both borough and township.
