= John Ayres House =

Historic house in Pennsylvania, United States

- U.S. National Register of Historic Places
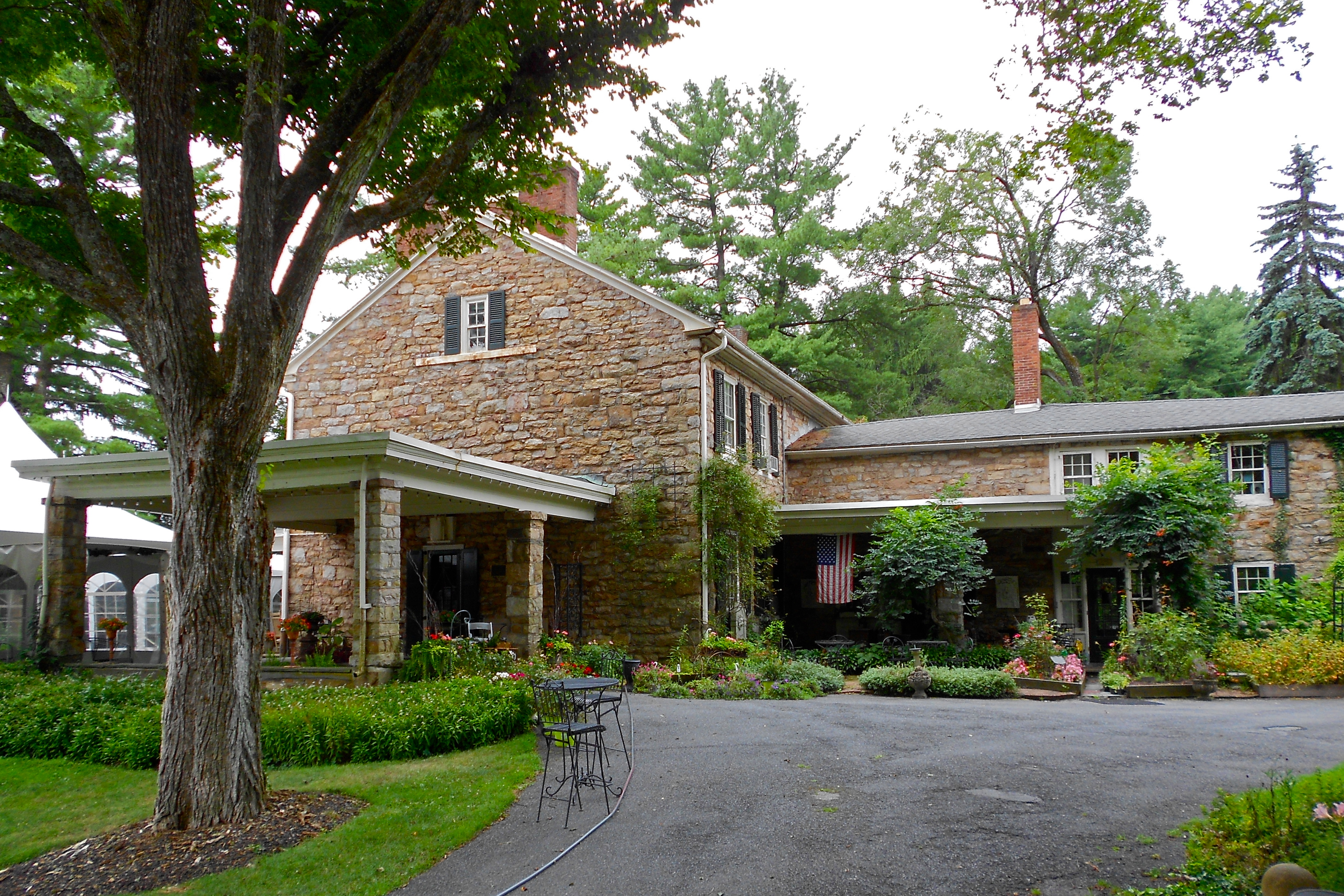
- John Ayres House, circa 2013

- Location within Pennsylvania Location within the United States
- Location: 1801 Peter's Mountain Rd.; Northwest of Dauphin on PA 325, Middle Paxton Township, Pennsylvania
- Coordinates: 40°23′54″N 76°56′52″W
- Area: 7.5 acres (3.0 ha)
- Built: c. 1805
- Architectural style: Federal
- NRHP reference No.: 79002215
- Added to NRHP: September 7, 1979

The John Ayres House is a historic home located in Middle Paxton Township, Dauphin County, Pennsylvania, United States. It was added to the National Register of Historic Places in 1979.

== History ==
The land where the John Ayres House is situated was acquired by John Ayres' parents, who had relocated from Philadelphia to Dauphin County, Pennsylvania, where they settled at the base of Peter's Mountain in October 1773. At that time, the Ayres' new property was bordered by Peter's Mountain (north) and lands owned by William Clark (east), Samuel Cochrane (south), and Jane Givens (west). William Ayres' property was subsequently bought by his son, John, who built a home there between 1800 and 1810.

== Architectural features ==
The original section of the John Ayres House was built between 1800 and 1810, and expanded between 1815 and 1825. It is a large, 2 1/2-story, 5-bay, limestone dwelling in the Federal style. Also situated on the property are a contributing gazebo, carriage house (c. 1895), stable, early stone pig or sheep barn (c. 1895), spring house, and tennis courts (1939).

On December 8, 1819, John Ayres was forced to sell a portion of his property at a Sheriff's sale. The terms of this sale stipulated that Ayers and his family would continue to be able to live in and use their home, which was described at that time as a stone dwelling. John Ayres later went on to become a successful attorney; when he died on August 17, 1825, he was reportedly the last of the Revolutionary War Patriots living in the area.

This property and its related buildings were added to the National Register of Historic Places in 1979.
