= Berrier Island =

Island in Dauphin County, Pennsylvania, United States

- Location within Pennsylvania

Geography
- Location: Susquehanna River
- Coordinates: 40°21′36″N 76°58′01″W
- Highest elevation: 335 ft (102.1 m)

Administration
- United States
- State: Pennsylvania
- County: Dauphin
- Borough: Dauphin

Berrier Island is an island located by the borough of Dauphin, Pennsylvania, on the Susquehanna River.
