= Speeceville, Pennsylvania =

Coordinates: 40°22′28.31″N 76°59′38.92″W

Speeceville is an unincorporated community in Middle Paxton Township in Dauphin County, Pennsylvania.

It is part of the Harrisburg–Carlisle metropolitan statistical area and lies within ZIP Code 17018. but uses the Dauphin post office.

Speeceville is located on US Routes 322 and 22 at the intersection with Pennsylvania Route 325 in Middle Paxton Township.

== History ==
A post office called Speeceville was established in 1894 and remained in operation until 1934.
