= Fort Hunter, Pennsylvania =

Unincorporated community in Pennsylvania, US

- Unincorporated community
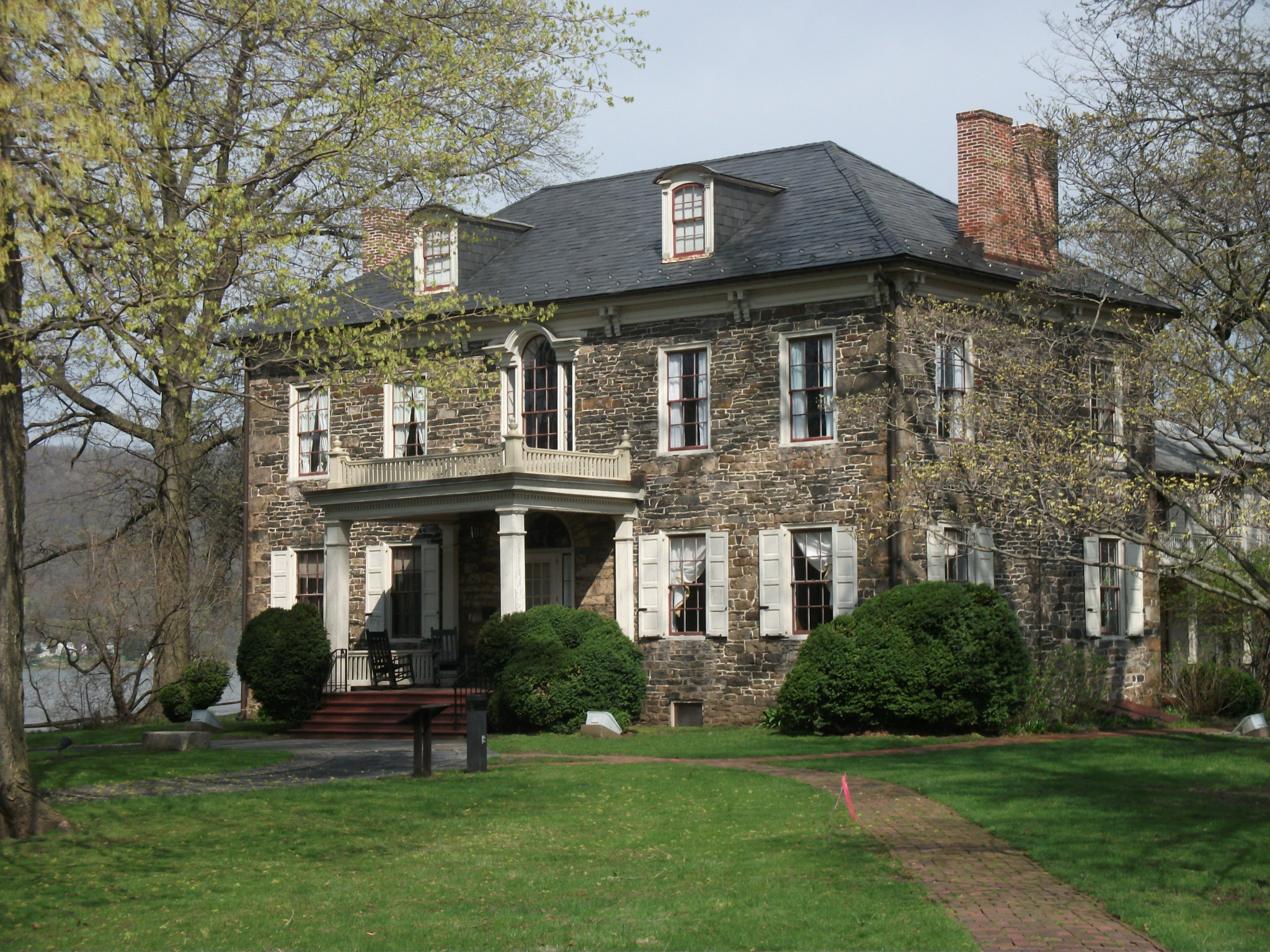

- Location within the state of Pennsylvania Fort Hunter (the United States)
- Coordinates: 40°20′46″N 76°54′43″W
- Country: United States
- State: Pennsylvania
- County: Dauphin
- Townships: Middle Paxton, Susquehanna
- Time zone: UTC-5 (Eastern (EST))
  - Summer (DST): UTC-4 (EDT)

Fort Hunter is an unincorporated community in Middle Paxton Township, Dauphin County, Pennsylvania, United States. It is part of the Harrisburg–Carlisle Metropolitan Statistical Area.

Six miles north of Harrisburg, on the south bank of Fishing Creek at its junction with the Susquehanna River, near Rockville, stood Fort Hunter, named after Robert Hunter, a pioneer who had previously settled there. Its construction was probably commenced by the settlers circa October or November 1755, immediately after the massacre at Penns Creek, and completed by the Government troops when taking charge in January, 1756.

It was a block-house surrounded by a stockade, and had additional barracks on the outside for the recruits on their way to Fort Augusta. It was generally under the command of Captain Thomas McKee and Captain James Patterson, of Lt. Colonel William Clapham's Augusta Regiment, being the only defense in this list not directly under Colonel Conrad Weiser's command. It occupied an important position and was used until the termination of all hostilities in 1764.

== See also ==
- Fort Hunter Park
- Fort Hunter Mansion

== Gallery ==
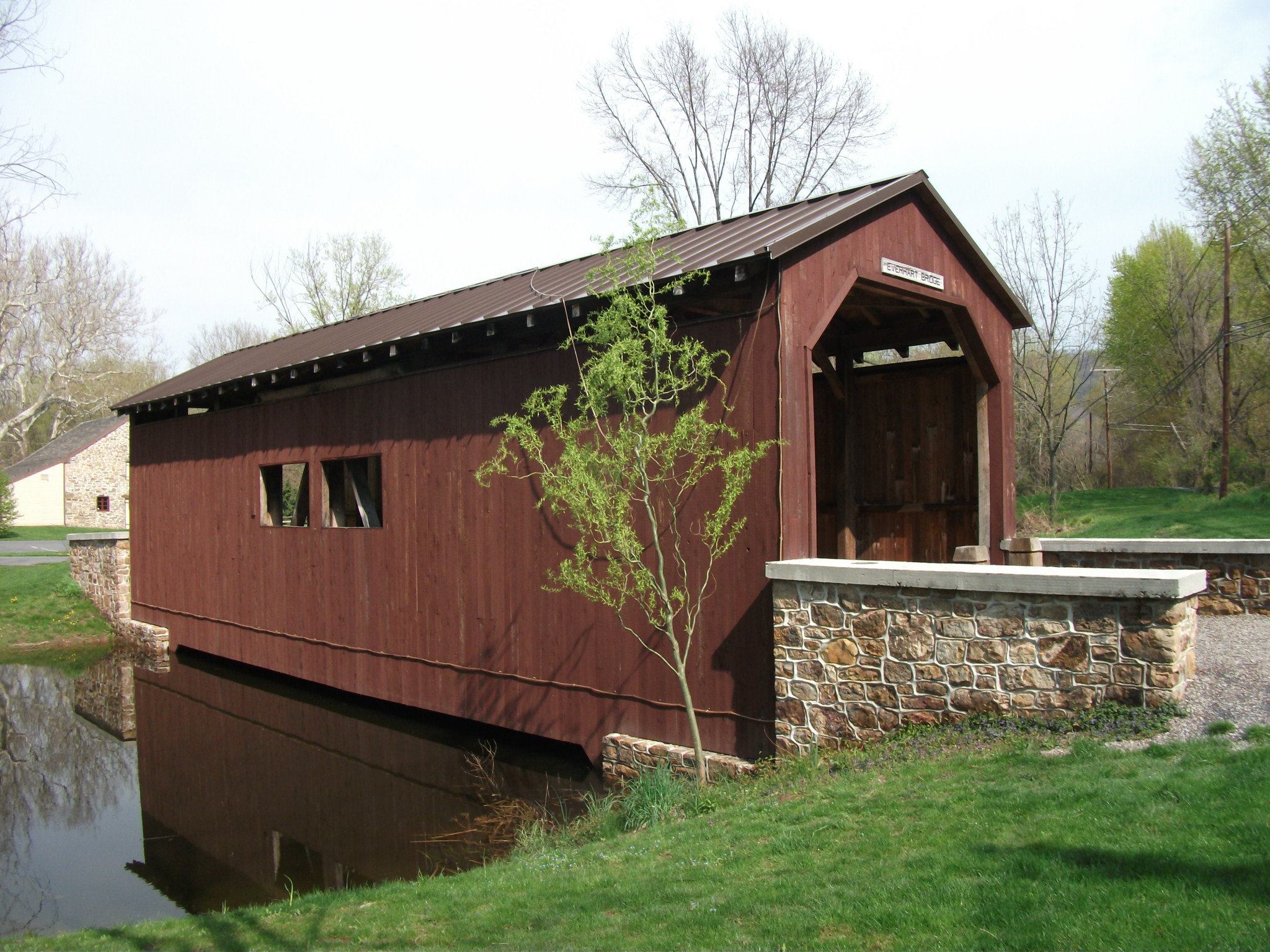

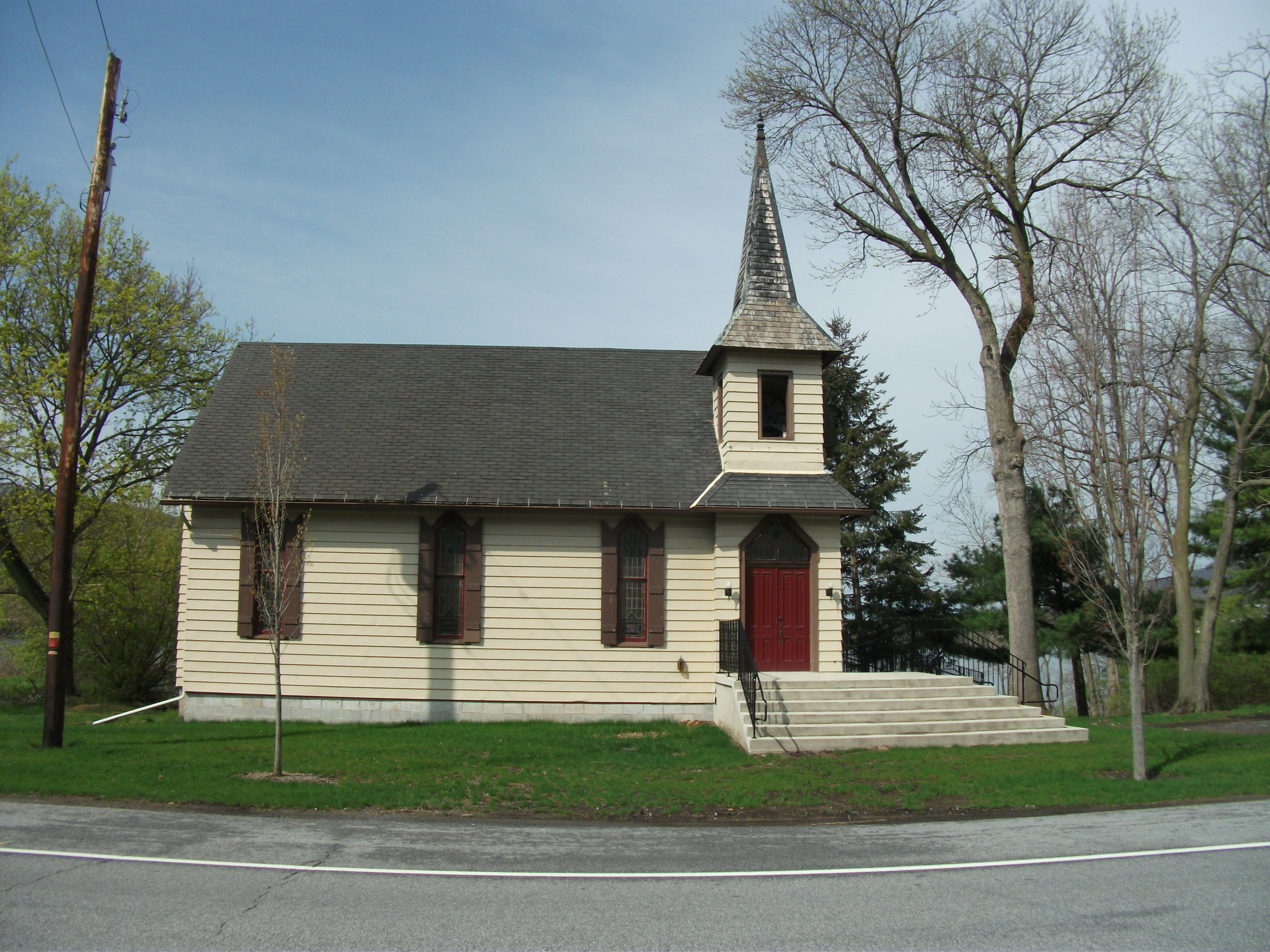

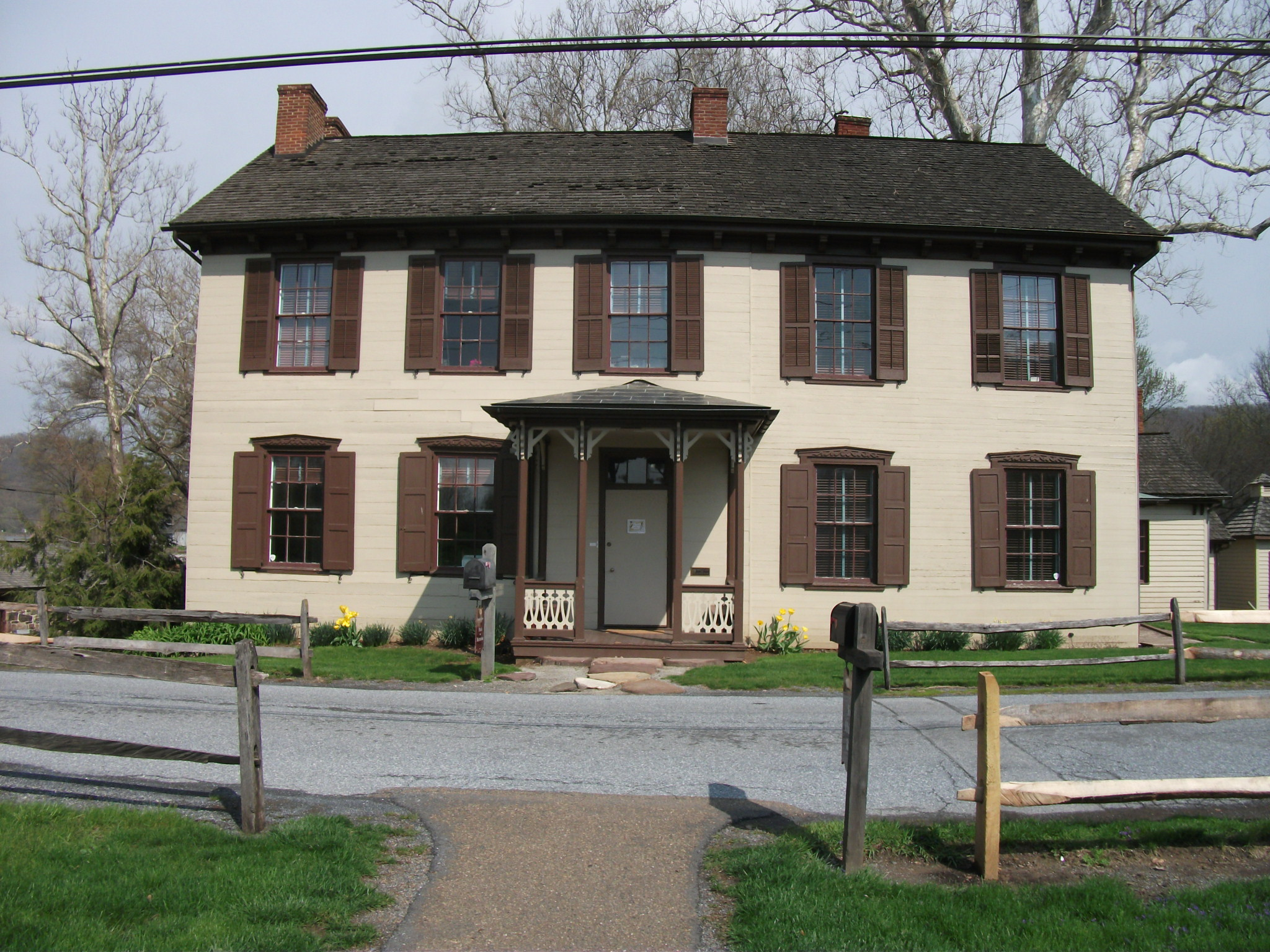

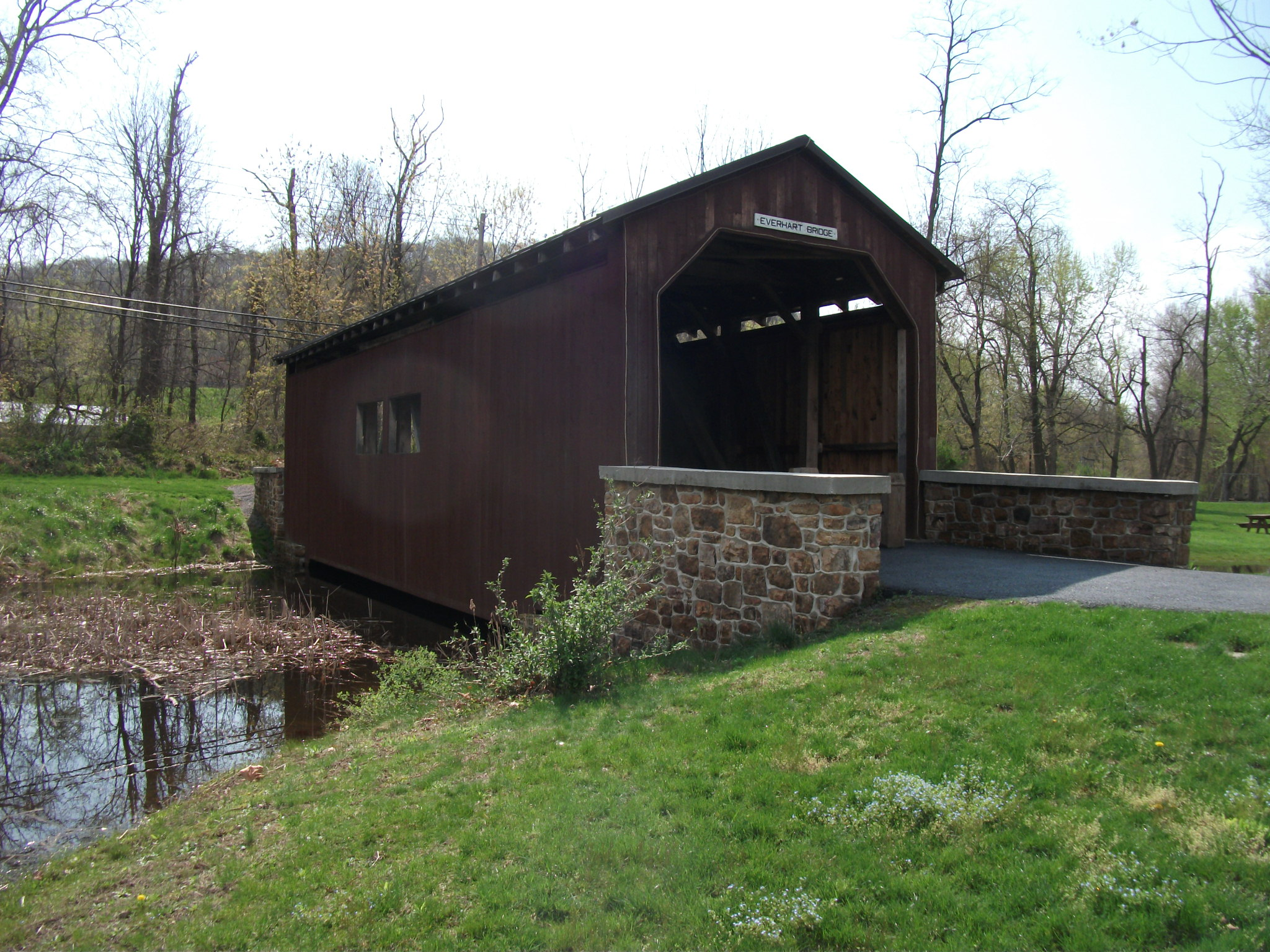

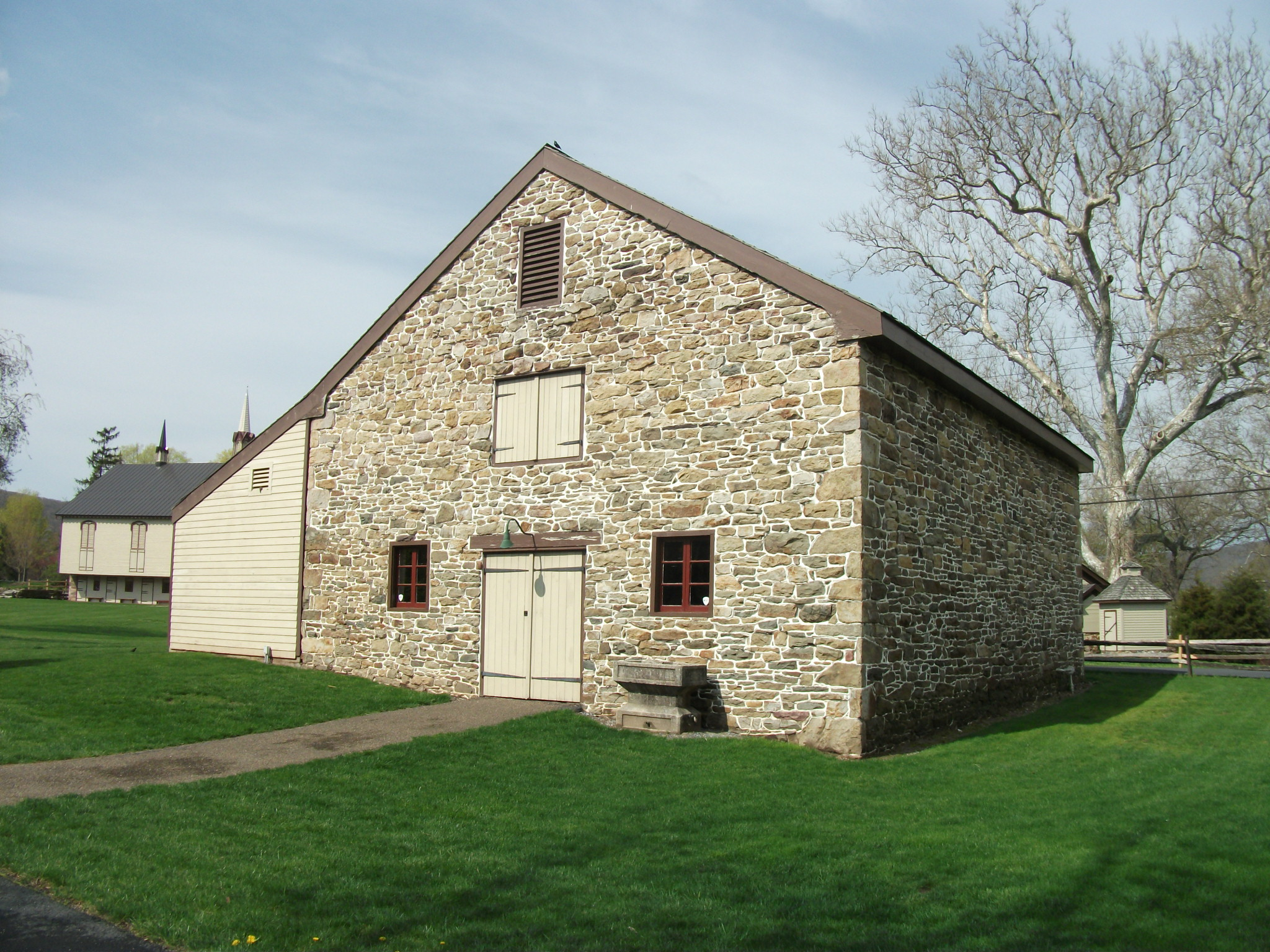

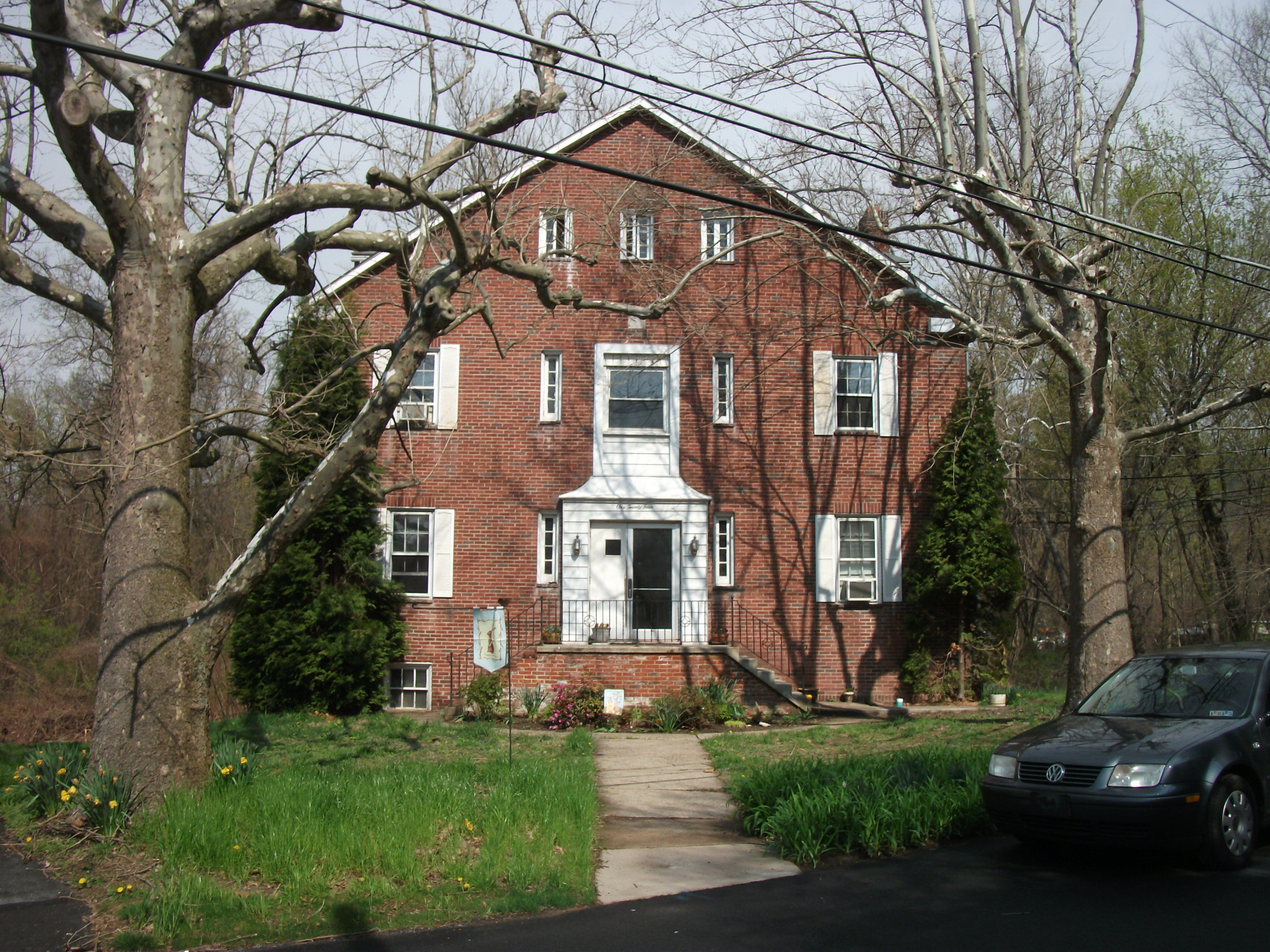

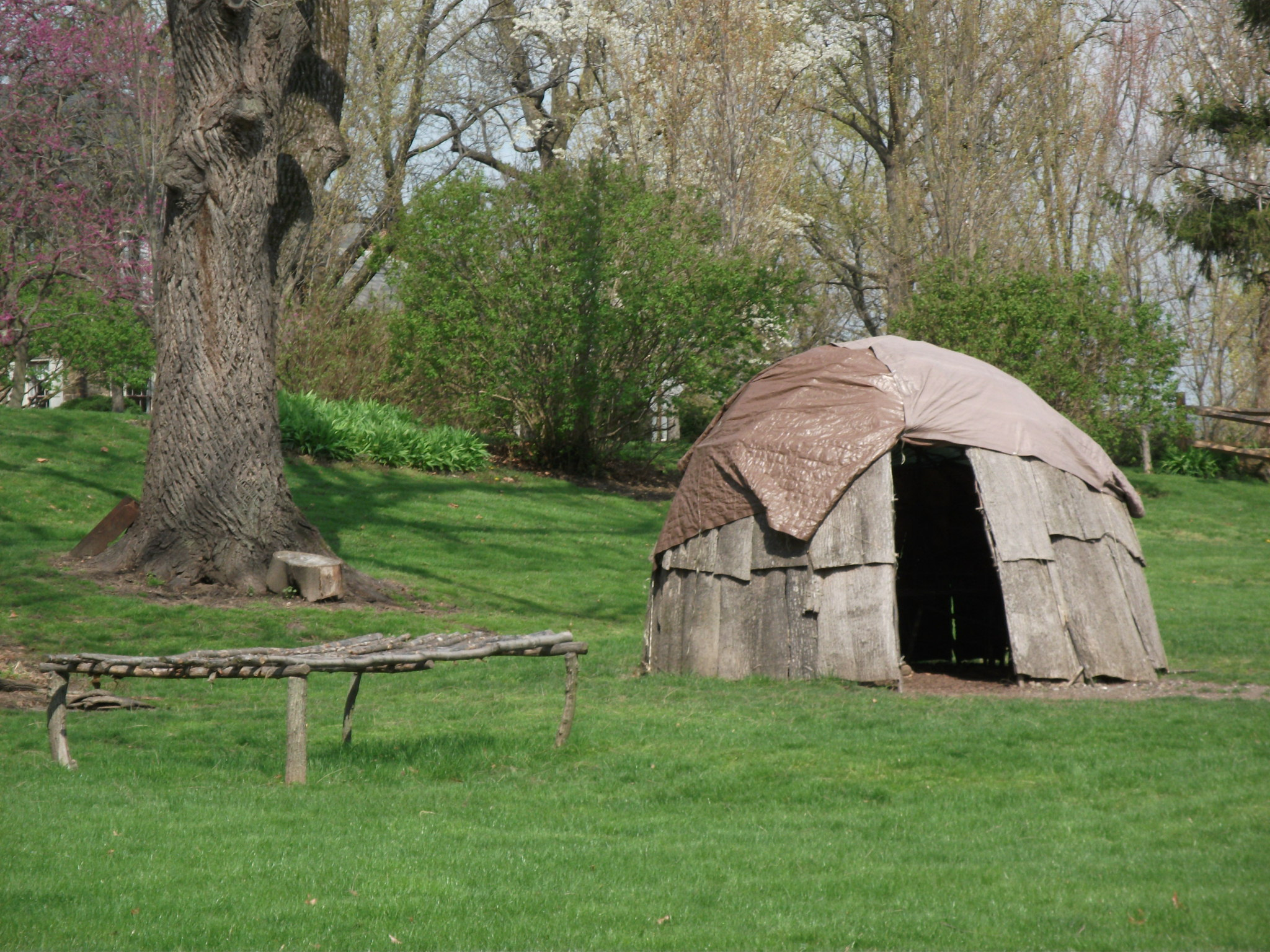

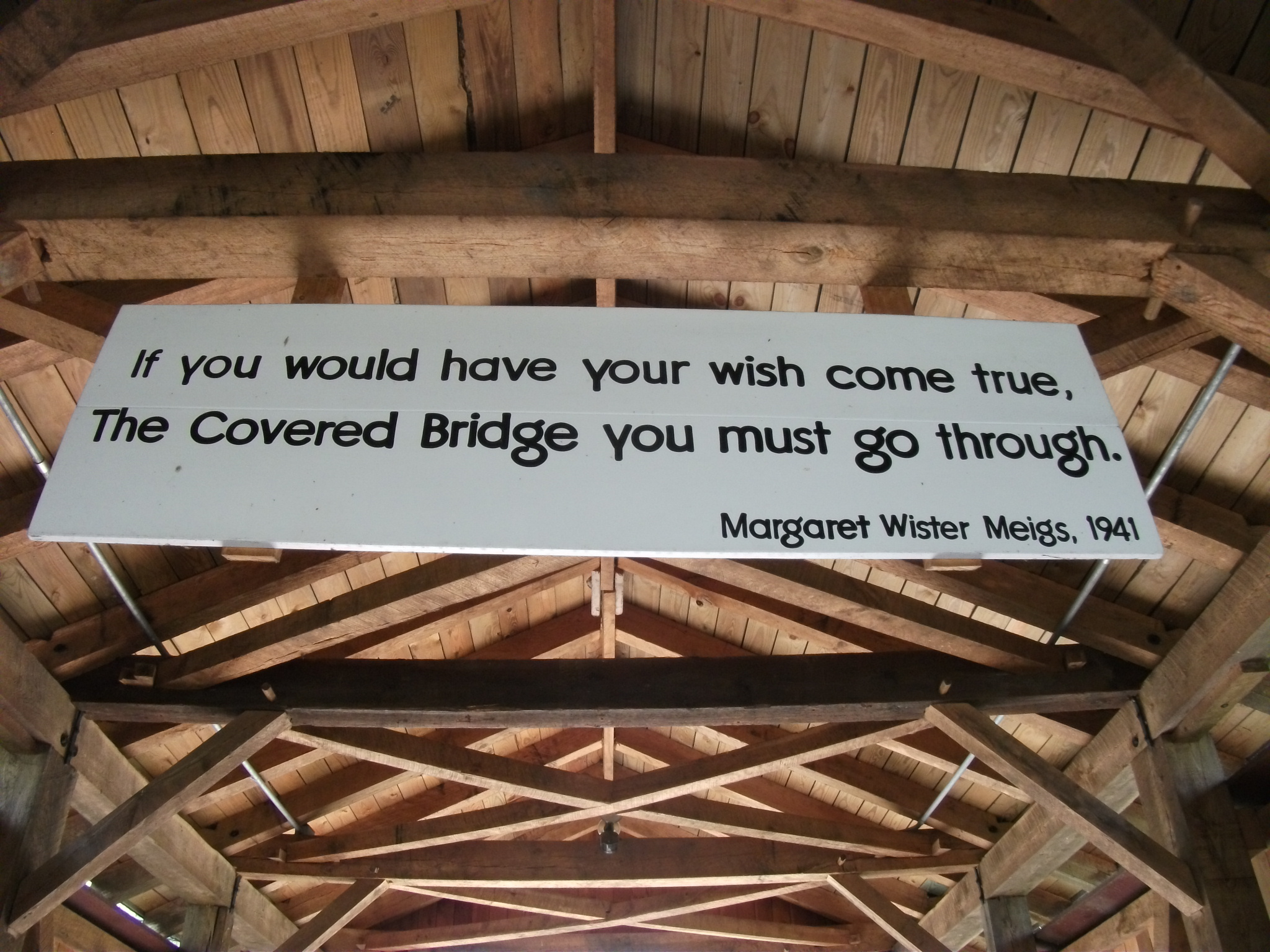

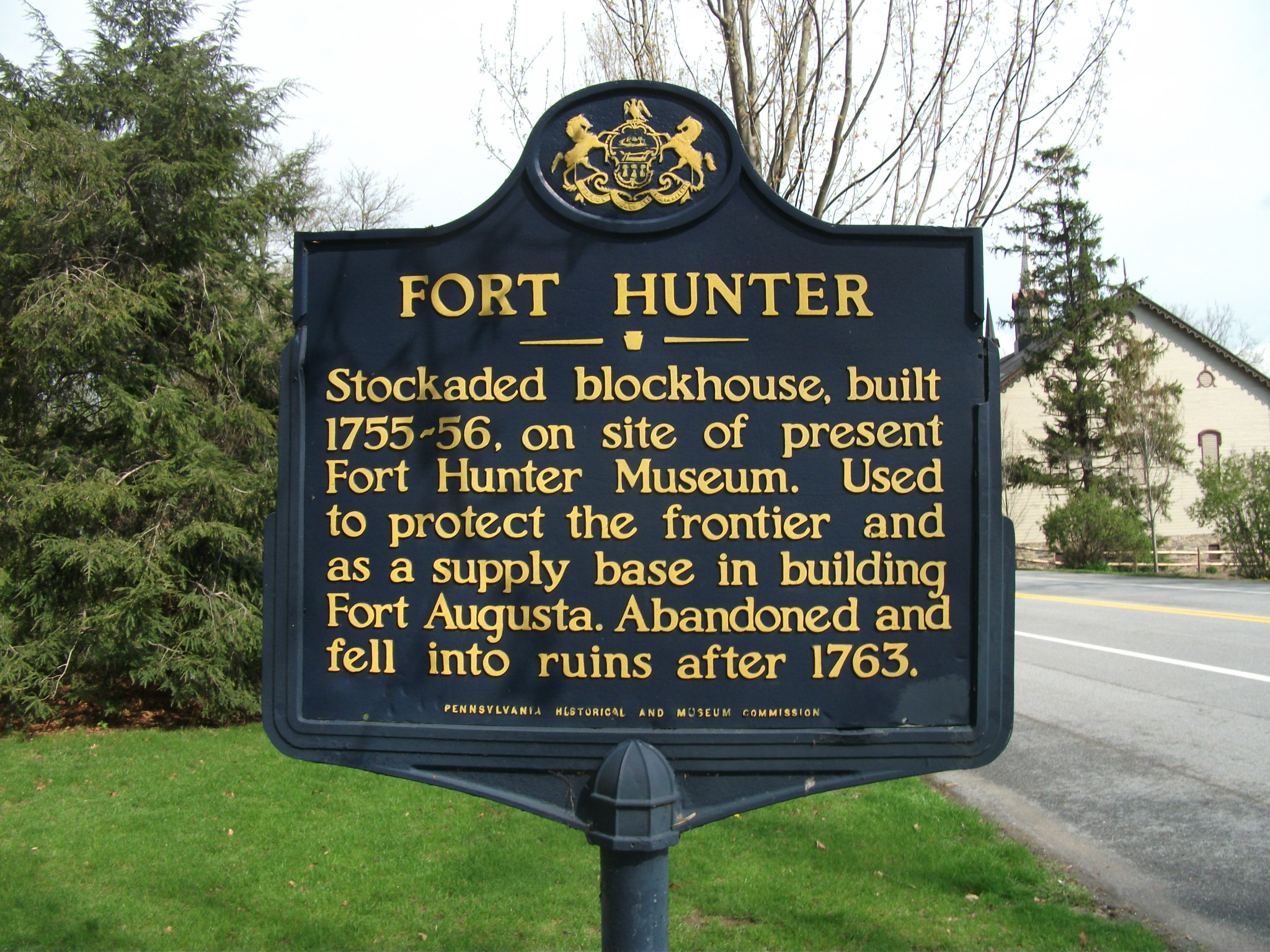
