= Rush Township, Dauphin County, Pennsylvania =

Township in Pennsylvania, US

Coordinates: 40°31′00″N 76°37′59″W

- Township
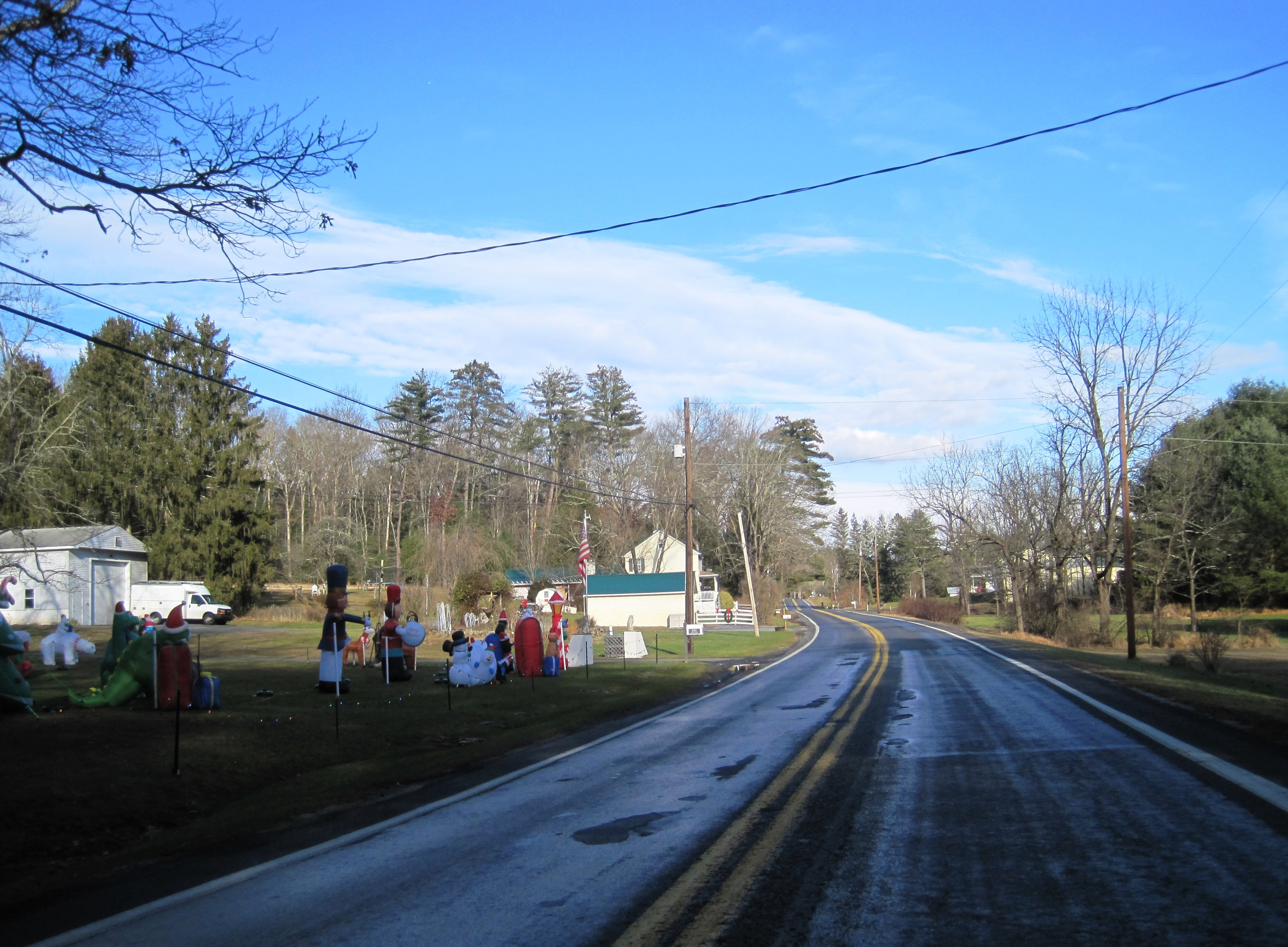
- Settled area of Rush Township along PA 325

- Location of Rush Township in Dauphin County (right) and of Dauphin County in Pennsylvania (left)
- Country: United States
- State: Pennsylvania
- County: Dauphin
- Incorporated: 1820

Area
  - Total: 24.46 sq mi (63.36 km^{2})
  - Land: 23.53 sq mi (60.95 km^{2})
  - Water: 0.93 sq mi (2.41 km^{2})

Population (2020)
  - Total: 226 ▼
  - Estimate (2023): 224
  - Density: 9.8/sq mi (3.79/km^{2})
- Time zone: UTC-5 (Eastern (EST))
  - Summer (DST): UTC-4 (EDT)
- Area code: 717
- FIPS code: 42-043-66744
- Website: www.rushtownshippa.com

Rush Township is a township in Dauphin County, Pennsylvania, United States. As of the 2020 census, the township population was 226, a decline from the figure of 231 tabulated in 2000.

Rush Township was named for Benjamin Rush, a signer of the Declaration of Independence.

== Geography ==
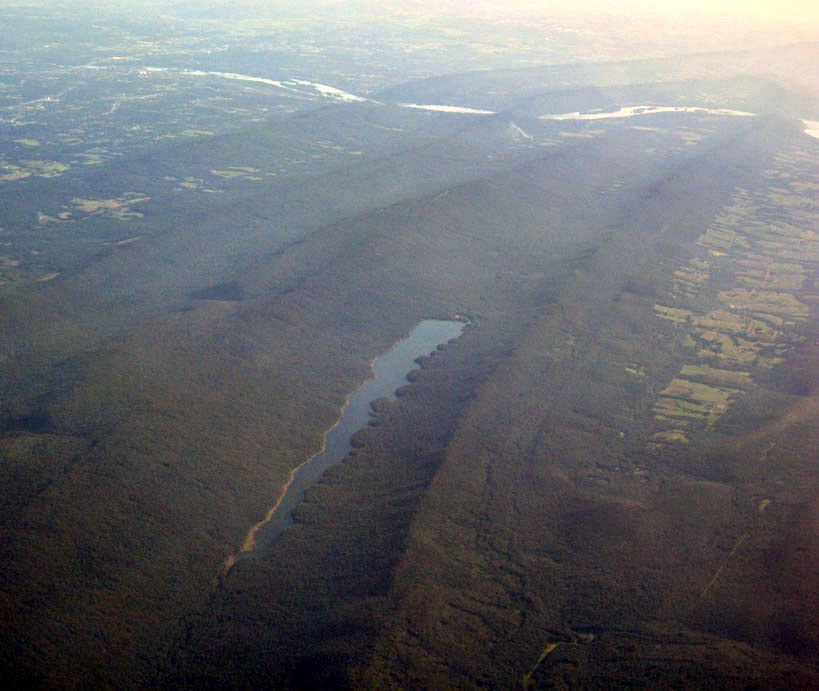
Most of Rush Township is within the Clark Creek valley seen here

Rush Township occupies a 15-mile-long (24 km) by 2-mile-wide (3.2 km) tract of land in northeastern Dauphin County. It is bordered on the northwest by Peters Mountain and on the southeast by Stony Mountain, with the valley of Clark Creek, including De Hart Reservoir, between them. Pennsylvania Route 325 travels the length of the township, following the north side of Clark Creek.

According to the United States Census Bureau, the township has a total area of 24.5 square miles (63.4 km^{2}), of which 23.5 square miles (60.9 km^{2}) is land and 0.93 square miles (2.4 km^{2}), or 3.81%, is water.

== Demographics ==
Historical population
Census	Pop.	Note	%±
2010	231		—
2020	226		−2.2%
2023 (est.)	224		−0.9%
U.S. Decennial Census

As of the census of 2000, there were 180 people, 70 households, and 55 families residing in the township. The population density was 7.7 people per square mile (3.0/km^{2}). There were 75 housing units at an average density of 3.2/sq mi (1.2/km^{2}). The racial makeup of the township was 97.22% White, 2.22% African American, 0.56% from other races. Hispanic or Latino of any race were 0.56% of the population.

There were 70 households, out of which 30.0% had children under the age of 18 living with them, 64.3% were married couples living together, 4.3% had a female householder with no husband present, and 21.4% were non-families. 14.3% of all households were made up of individuals, and 7.1% had someone living alone who was 65 years of age or older. The average household size was 2.57 and the average family size was 2.91.

In the township the population was spread out, with 21.1% under the age of 18, 10.6% from 18 to 24, 30.0% from 25 to 44, 29.4% from 45 to 64, and 8.9% who were 65 years of age or older. The median age was 40 years. For every 100 females, there were 130.8 males. For every 100 females age 18 and over, there were 121.9 males.

The median income for a household in the township was $51,250, and the median income for a family was $46,875. Males had a median income of $43,000 versus $25,313 for females. The per capita income for the township was $22,579. None of the population or families were below the poverty line.
