= Fishing Creek (Susquehanna River tributary) =

Tributary of the Susquehanna River in Pennsylvania

Coordinates: 40°20′35″N 76°54′38″W

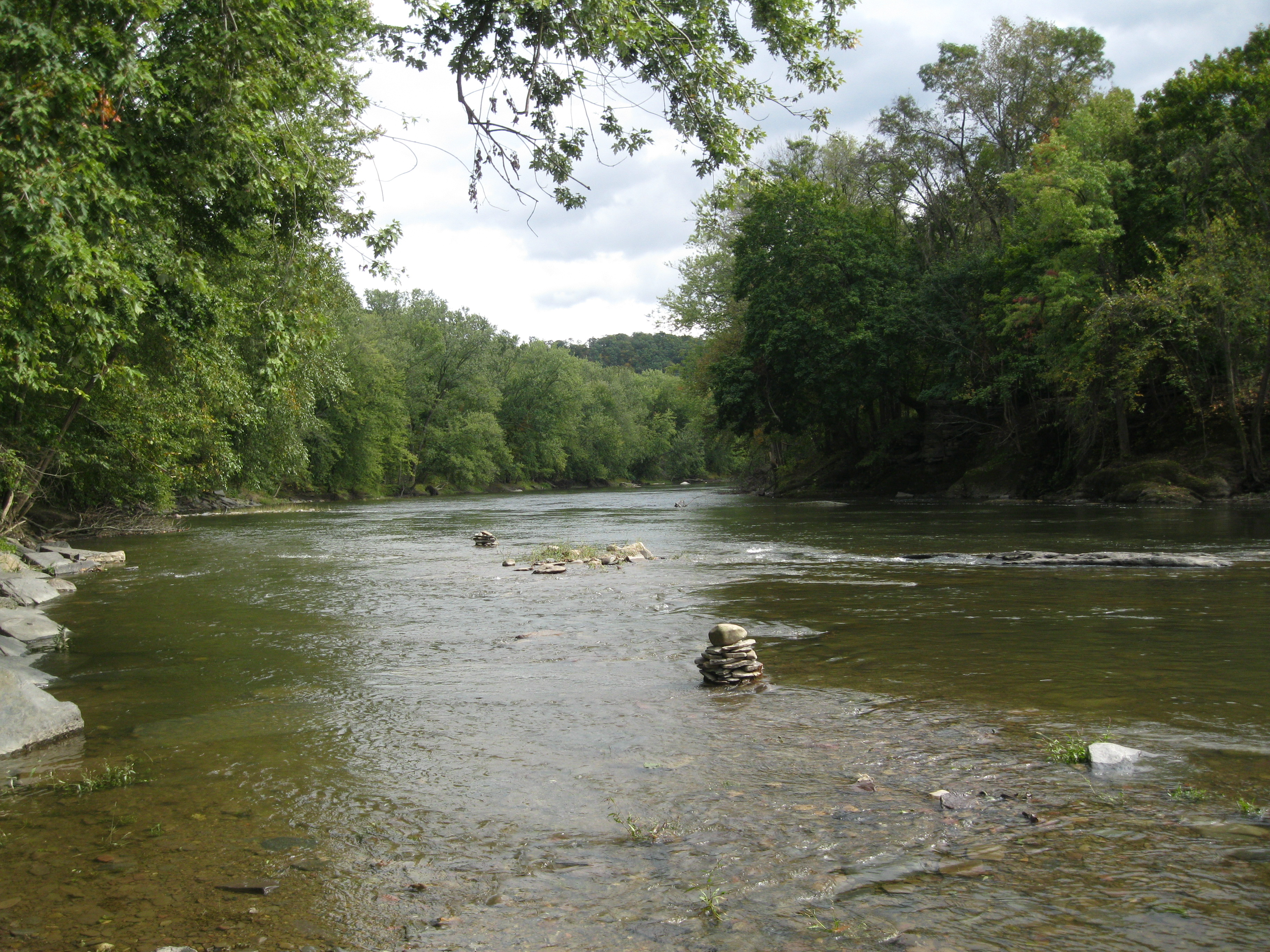

Fishing Creek is an 11.5-mile-long (18.5 km) tributary of the Susquehanna River in Dauphin County, Pennsylvania, in the United States.

Fishing Creek flows west through West Hanover and Middle Paxton townships and joins the Susquehanna River at the unincorporated community of Fort Hunter.

Another Fishing Creek exists directly across the Susquehanna River in the borough of Marysville, Pennsylvania.

== See also ==
- List of rivers of Pennsylvania
