= Fort Hunter Historic District =

Historic district in Pennsylvania, United States

- U.S. National Register of Historic Places
- U.S. Historic district
- Pennsylvania state historical marker
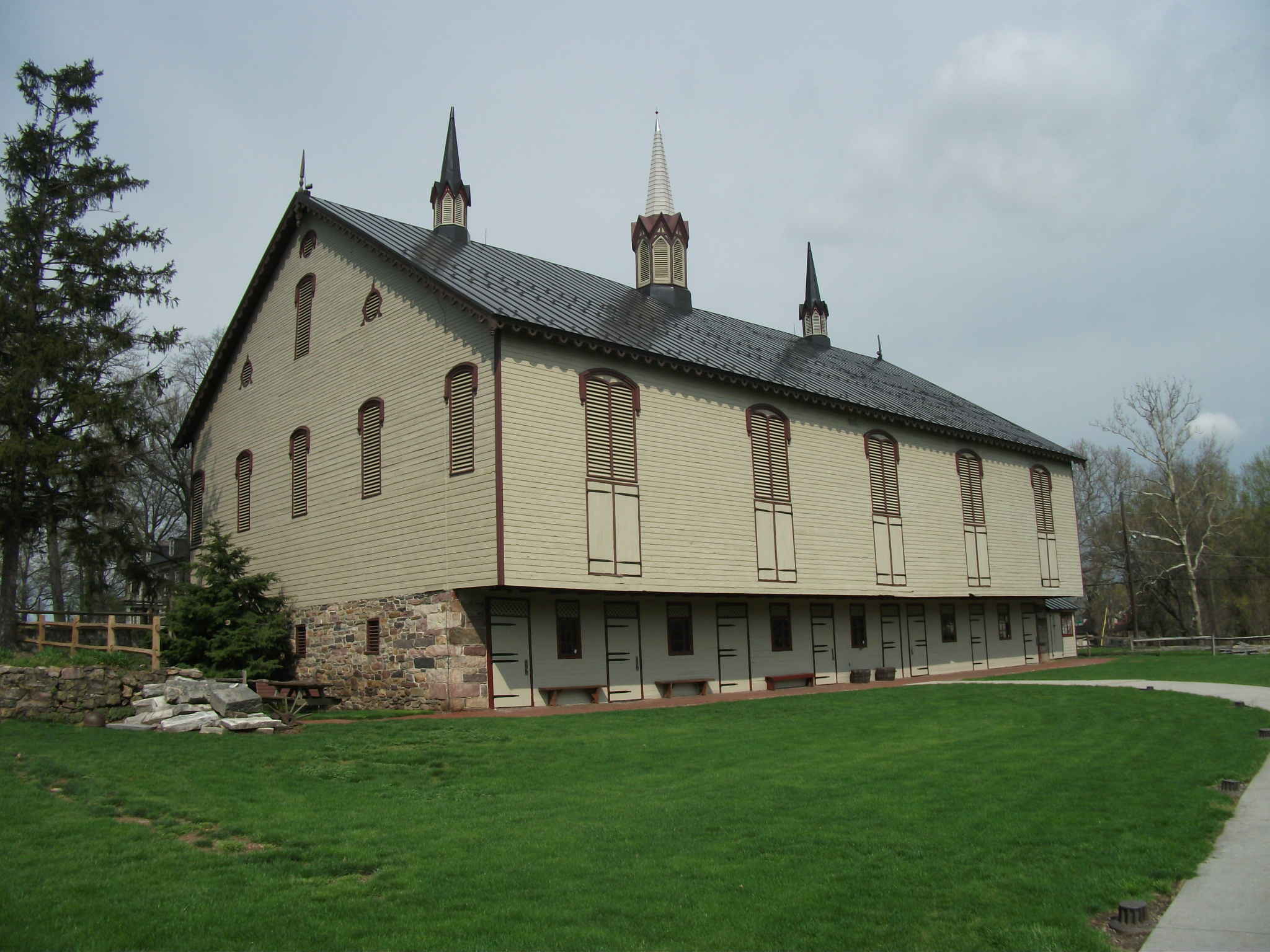
- Frame barn across Old 22 from the McAllister House

- Location within Pennsylvania Location within the United States
- Location: U.S. 22, Fort Hunter, Pennsylvania
- Coordinates: 40°20′29″N 76°54′30″W
- Area: 32 acres (13 ha)
- Built: 1760
- Architectural style: Late Victorian, Georgian, High Victorian
- NRHP reference No.: 79002216

Significant dates
- Added to NRHP: August 17, 1979
- Designated PHMC: July 3, 1947

Fort Hunter Historic District is a national historic district located at Fort Hunter, Dauphin County, Pennsylvania, United States. The district includes six contributing buildings, four contributing sites, and one contributing structure. The area has seen continuous settlement since the early 1700s and once was the site of an early supply fort (Fort Hunter) and garrison. Also in the district are the remains of a section of the Pennsylvania Canal. Notable buildings include the separately listed Archibald McAllister House, a spring house, Everhart Covered Bridge, large frame barn (1876), corn crib, farm house, blacksmith shop, stone stable barn, Hunter's House or Old Hotel, ice house, and archaeological sites for Fort Hunter, the garrison, Hunter's Mill, and the Pennsylvania Canal.

It was added to the National Register of Historic Places in 1979.

== 2023 lawsuit ==
In June 2022 two members of the Keystone Party of Pennsylvania, candidate Dave Kocur and executive board member Kevin Gaughen, were collecting signatures for Kocur to appear on the ballot for the election for PA-104. The pair were approached by Dauphin County Parks and Recreation director Anthea Stebbin and two security guards and ordered to immediately cease collecting signatures and vacate the park's premises. The County stated in its defense that when the land which would become the park was purchased in 1980, one of the clauses of the deed was that no political activities would take place on the property. Kocur and Gaughen argued that since it is public parkland that the county government shouldn't be allowed restrict First Amendment rights based on clauses of deeds. The pair's legal team, the Foundation for Individual Rights and Expression (FIRE), cited a 1966 Supreme Court case, Evans v. Newton, which states that any local government's property-conveyance restrictions must comport with the Constitution. The county was noted as being unusually confrontational on the issue when the American Civil Liberties Union attempted to mediate. In March 2023, the County called FIRE's legal notice a "threat" and refused to negotiate with the defendants, their legal team, or the ACLU, resulting in the case reaching the United States District Court for the Middle District of Pennsylvania. On April 26, 2023, the Court found in favor of Kocur and Gaughen; it ordered Dauphin County and Stebbin to end the unconstitutional ban on political speech in the park and pay the pair $91,000.
