= Clark Creek (Susquehanna River tributary) =

Creek in Pennsylvania, US

Coordinates: 40°22′06″N 76°57′43″W

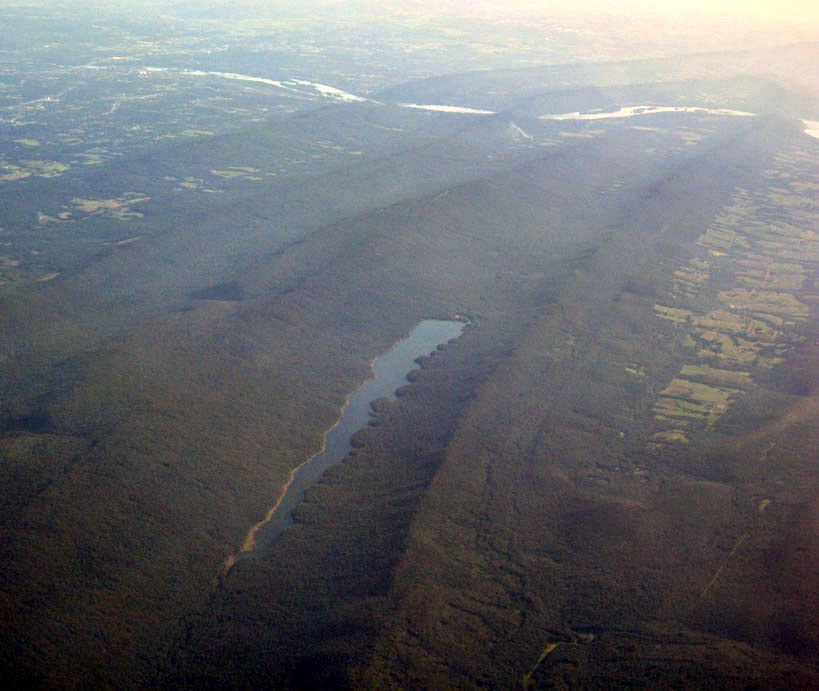
Oblique air photo of De Hart Reservoir, Clark Creek, facing southwest, with Susquehanna River in background

Clark Creek is a 31.4-mile-long (50.5 km) tributary of the Susquehanna River in Dauphin County, Pennsylvania, in the United States. Clark Creek was named for the Clark family who settled near its banks in the 1720s.

The creek is dammed to form DeHart Reservoir, part of the water supply system for the city of Harrisburg. Clark Creek joins the Susquehanna River upstream of the borough of Dauphin.

== See also ==
- List of rivers of Pennsylvania
