= Singersville, Pennsylvania =

Unincorporated community in Pennsylvania, U.S.

Coordinates: 40.377°N 76.912°W

Singersville is an unincorporated community in Middle Paxton Township, Dauphin County, Pennsylvania, United States, situated in the Harrisburg–Carlisle metropolitan statistical area.
