= Middle Paxton Township, Pennsylvania =

Township in Pennsylvania, US

Coordinates: 40°22′00″N 76°49′59″W

- Township
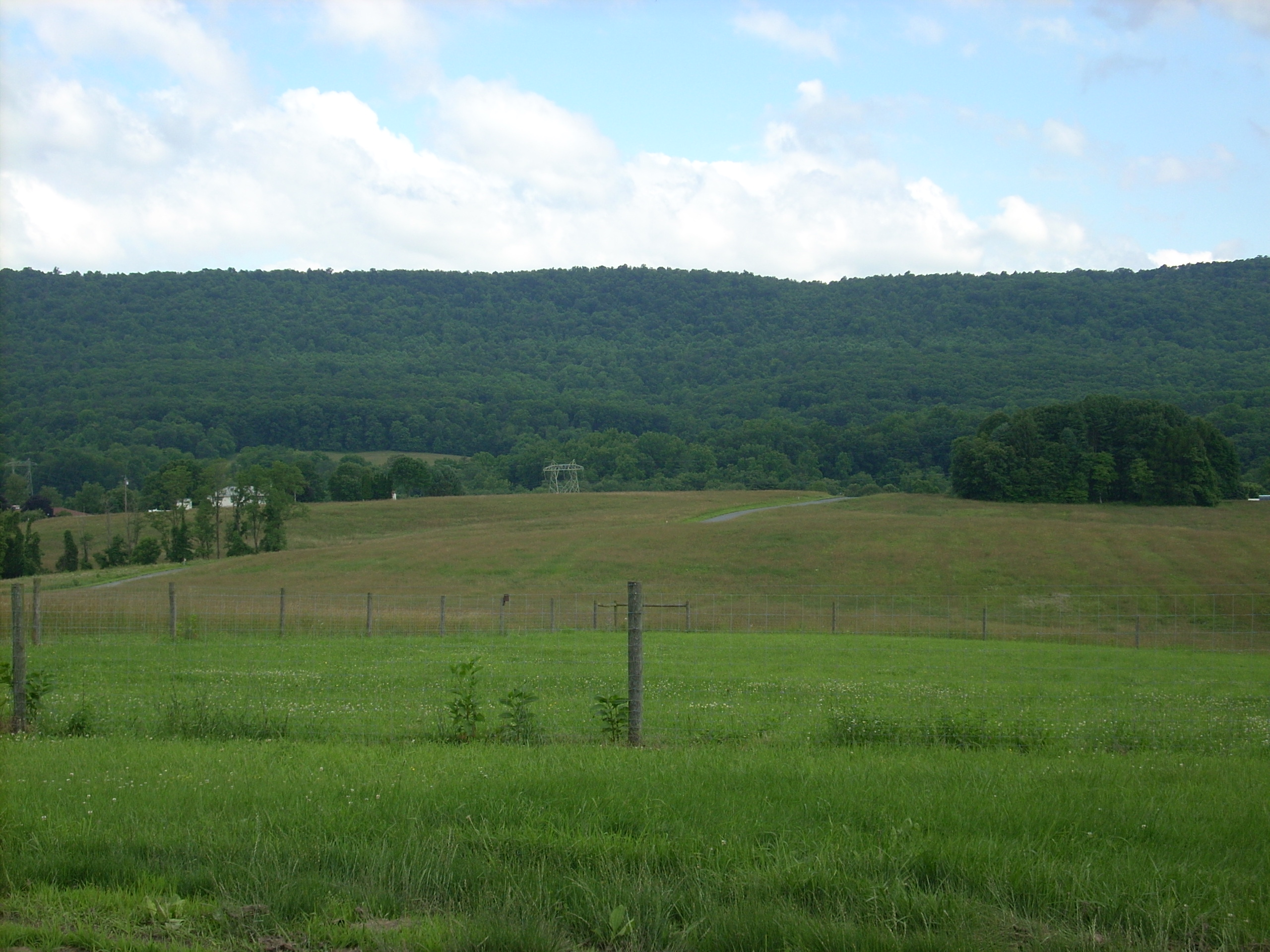
- A Middle Paxton Township vista from Boyd Big Tree Preserve Conservation Area

- Flag Logo

- Location in Dauphin County and state of Pennsylvania
- Country: United States
- State: Pennsylvania
- County: Dauphin
- Settled: 1750
- Incorporated: 1787

Area
  - Total: 59.14 sq mi (153.18 km^{2})
  - Land: 54.41 sq mi (140.92 km^{2})
  - Water: 4.73 sq mi (12.26 km^{2})

Population (2020)
  - Total: 5,054 ▲
  - Estimate (2023): 5,073
  - Density: 92.9/sq mi (35.86/km^{2})
- Time zone: UTC-5 (Eastern (EST))
  - Summer (DST): UTC-4 (EDT)
- Area code: 717
- FIPS code: 42-043-49040
- Website: middlepaxtontwp.org

Middle Paxton Township is a township in Dauphin County, Pennsylvania, United States. The population was 5,054 at the 2020 census.

== History ==
In 1729 Paxtang Township of Lancaster County was established. The spelling "Paxtang" is from the original Indian name Peshtank, which meant "standing water". Today the word "Paxton" is used instead of Paxtang.

On March 4, 1785, Lancaster County was split to form Dauphin County, named for the Dauphin of France, heir apparent to the French throne, whose country the area government wanted to honor for its assistance in the Revolutionary War. About two years later in August 1787 the legislature began to splinter Paxtang Township, first into Upper Paxtang, Middle Paxtang and Lower Paxtang.

The John Ayres House was listed on the National Register of Historic Places in 1979.

== Geography ==
Middle Paxton Township is in central and western Dauphin County, bordered to the southwest and west by the Susquehanna River. The township is in the Ridge and Valley Province of the Appalachian Mountains; four parallel mountain ridges cross the township from southwest to northeast. The northern border of the township follows the crest of Peters Mountain. Next to the south is Third Mountain, followed by Second Mountain, which forms part of the southern border of the township, and finally Blue Mountain, which forms the remainder of the southern border.

The borough of Dauphin is in the western part of the township on the Susquehanna River, but is a separate municipality. The township has unincorporated communities, including Ellendale Forge, Fort Hunter, Heckton, Singersville, Speecville, Stone Glen and Victoria Furnace.

According to the United States Census Bureau, the township has a total area of 59.2 square miles (153.2 km^{2}), of which 54.4 square miles (140.9 km^{2}) is land and 4.7 square miles (12.3 km^{2}), or 8.01%, is water. Nearly all of the water surface area is part of the Susquehanna River.

== Demographics ==
Historical population
Census	Pop.	Note	%±
2010	4,976		—
2020	5,054		1.6%
2023 (est.)	5,073		0.4%
U.S. Decennial Census

As of the census of 2000, there were 4,823 people, 1,906 households, and 1,456 families residing in the township. The population density was 88.4 inhabitants per square mile (34.1/km^{2}). There were 1,988 housing units at an average density of 36.4 per square mile (14.1/km^{2}). The racial makeup of the township was 98.01% White, 0.27% African American, 0.17% Native American, 0.41% Asian, 0.02% Pacific Islander, 0.48% from other races, and 0.64% from two or more races. Hispanic or Latino of any race were 0.70% of the population.

There were 1,906 households, out of which 30.0% had children under the age of 18 living with them, 65.2% were married couples living together, 7.5% had a female householder with no husband present, and 23.6% were non-families. 19.2% of all households were made up of individuals, and 7.1% had someone living alone who was 65 years of age or older. The average household size was 2.53 and the average family size was 2.88.

In the township the population was spread out, with 22.0% under the age of 18, 6.1% from 18 to 24, 27.6% from 25 to 44, 32.0% from 45 to 64, and 12.3% who were 65 years of age or older. The median age was 42 years. For every 100 females, there were 100.8 males. For every 100 females age 18 and over, there were 98.2 males.

The median income for a household in the township was $54,619, and the median income for a family was $59,007. Males had a median income of $41,037 versus $30,233 for females. The per capita income for the township was $28,146. About 4.2% of families and 5.2% of the population were below the poverty line, including 7.0% of those under age 18 and 2.4% of those age 65 or over.

== Education ==
Children in the township attend public school at the Central Dauphin School District.
