= Archibald McAllister House =

Historic house in Pennsylvania, United States

- U.S. National Register of Historic Places
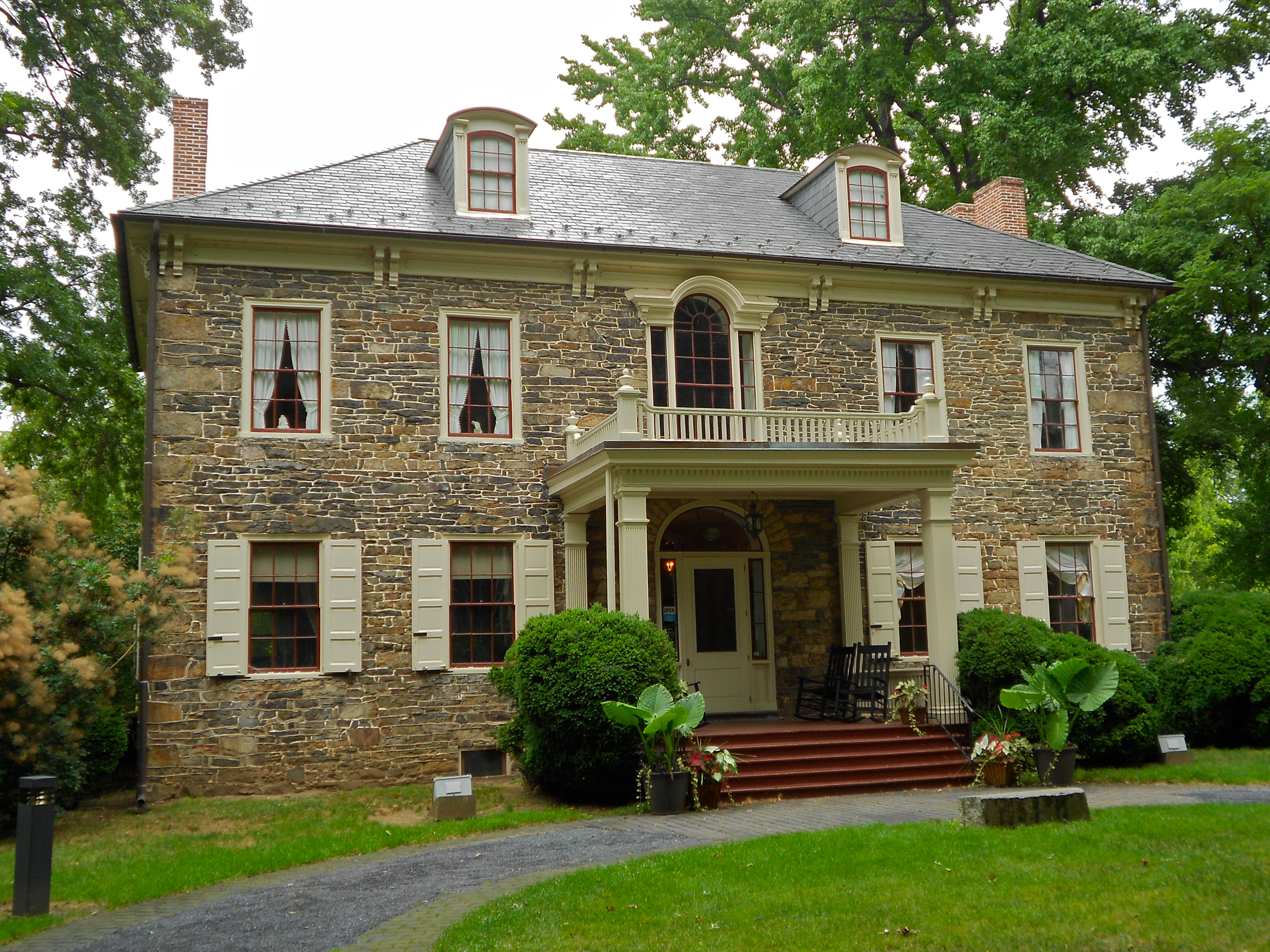
- Archibald McAllister House, August 2013

- Location within Pennsylvania Location within the United States
- Location: 5300 N. Front St., Harrisburg, Pennsylvania
- Coordinates: 40°20′34″N 76°54′37″W
- Area: 0.1 acres (0.040 ha)
- Built: 1814
- Architectural style: Federal
- NRHP reference No.: 76001633
- Added to NRHP: June 7, 1976

Archibald McAllister House, now officially known as Fort Hunter Mansion, is a historic home located on the Susquehanna River approximately 6 miles north of downtown Harrisburg, Dauphin County, Pennsylvania. It consists of a 2-story, 2-room stone "cabin' built in 1787, to which was added in 1814 a 2 1/2-story, five-bay wide stone dwelling in the Federal style. The mansion has an overall "T"-floorplan, with the 2 1/2-story 1814 addition in front and the original 1787 cabin and an attached, woodframe summer kitchen built in the mid- to late-19th century to the rear. The mansion features a front portico with Tuscan order columns above which is a Palladian window on the second floor. The entry door has a semi-circular fanlight and sidelights with thin wooden ribbing.

The house is open as a 19th-century historic house museum and 40 acre park.

It was added to the National Register of Historic Places in 1976. It is located in the Fort Hunter Historic District.
