= Peters Mountain (Pennsylvania) =

Mountain ridge in Pennsylvania, United States

Coordinates: 40.4340°N 76.8486°W

Peters Mountain [el. 1,273 ft (388 m)] is a ridge in Dauphin County, Pennsylvania. The ridge contains a scenic overlook.

Peters Mountain was named for Peter Allen, a pioneer settler.
