= Wiconisco =

Wiconisco may refer to the following in the U.S. state of Pennsylvania:

- Wiconisco Canal, in Dauphin County
- Wiconisco Creek, a tributary of the Susquehanna River
- Wiconisco Township, Pennsylvania
