= Orwin, Pennsylvania =

Unincorporated community in Pennsylvania, US

- Census-designated place
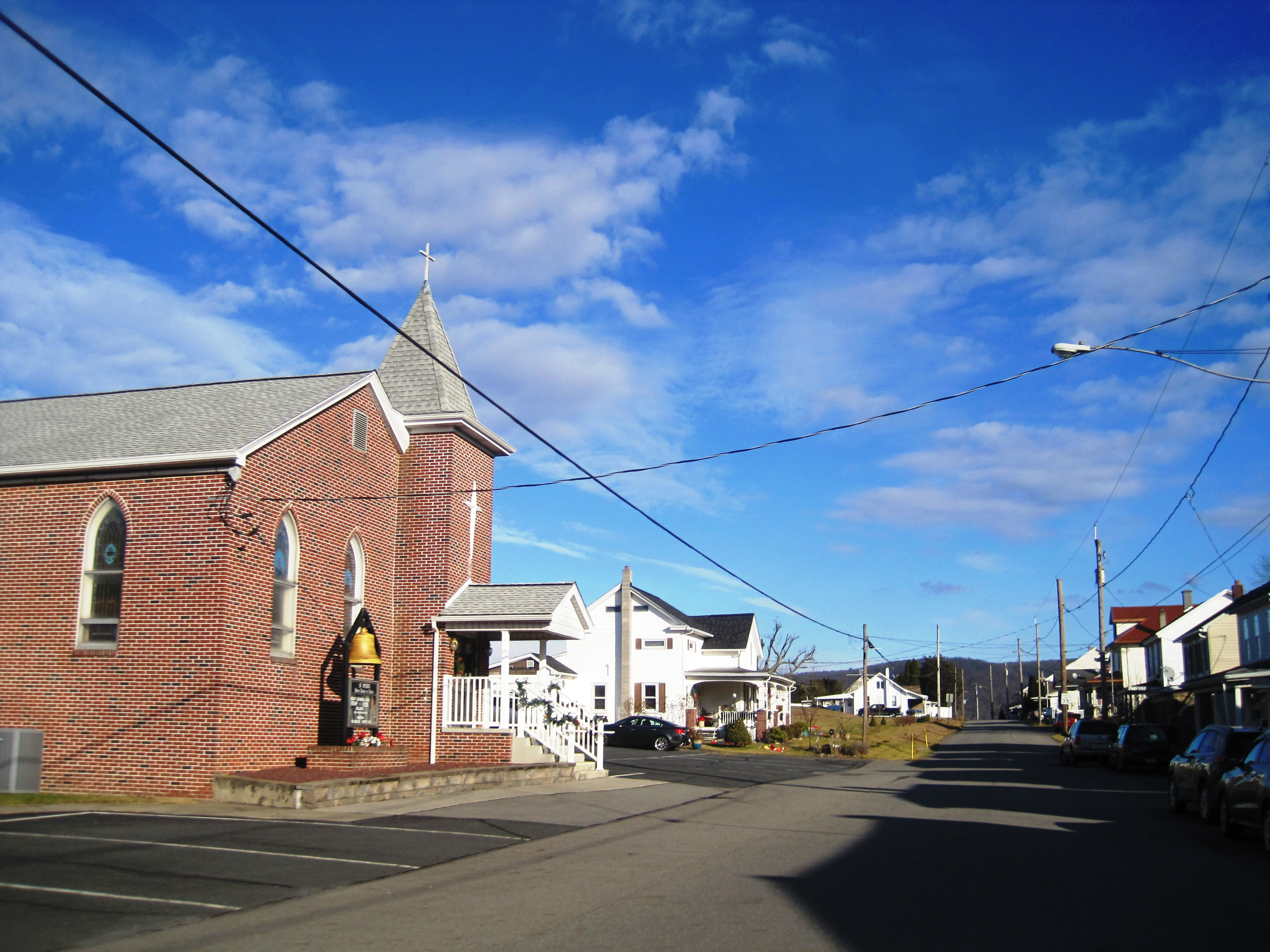
- Dietrich Avenue in Orwin
- Interactive map of Orwin, Pennsylvania
- Coordinates: 40°35′02″N 76°31′53″W
- Country: United States
- State: Pennsylvania
- County: Schuylkill

Area
  - Total: 0.61 sq mi (1.59 km^{2})
  - Land: 0.61 sq mi (1.59 km^{2})
  - Water: 0 sq mi (0.00 km^{2})

Population (2020)
  - Total: 304
  - Density: 494.7/sq mi (190.99/km^{2})
- Time zone: UTC-5 (Eastern (EST))
  - Summer (DST): UTC-4 (EDT)
- FIPS code: 42-57192
- GNIS feature ID: 2634251

Orwin is a census-designated place located in Porter Township, Schuylkill County in the state of Pennsylvania, United States. Orwin was part of the Reinerton-Orwin-Muir CDP at the 2000 census before splitting into three individual CDPs for the 2010 census. The other communities, along with Orwin are Reinerton and Muir. The community is located near the community of Muir along U.S. Route 209. As of the 2010 census, the population was 314 residents.

== Demographics ==
Historical population
Census	Pop.	Note	%±
2020	304		—
U.S. Decennial Census

== Education ==
The school district is Williams Valley School District.
