= Les Brown (bandleader) =

American bandleader (1912–2001)

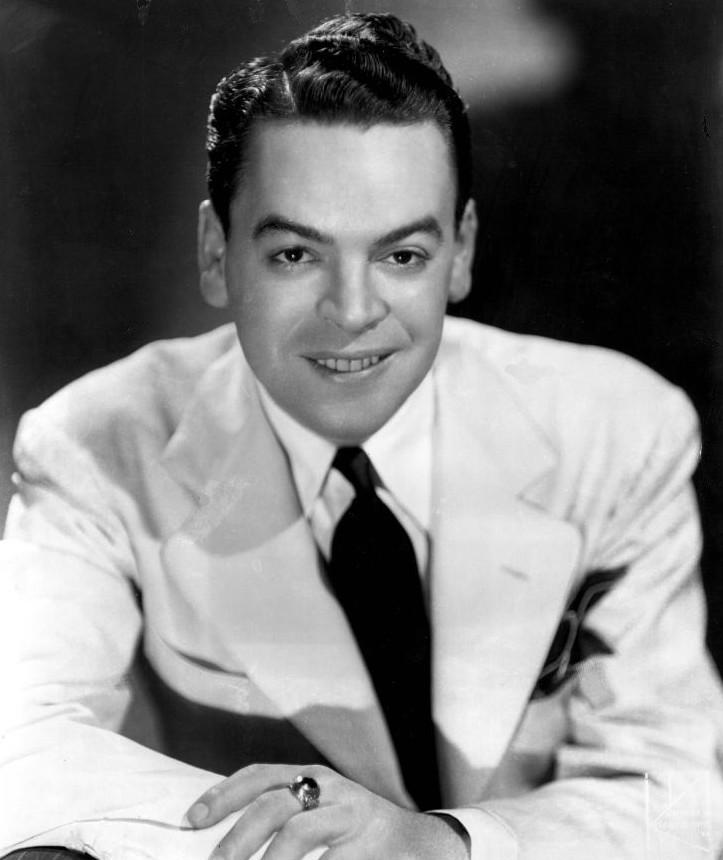
- Brown in 1947

Background information
- Born: Lester Raymond Brown; March 14, 1912; Reinerton, Pennsylvania, U.S.
- Died: January 4, 2001 (aged 88) Pacific Palisades, California, U.S.
- Genres: Jazz, big band, swing, traditional pop
- Occupations: Musician, bandleader
- Instruments: Saxophone, clarinet
- Years active: 1936–2000
- Labels: Decca, Bluebird, Columbia, Capitol

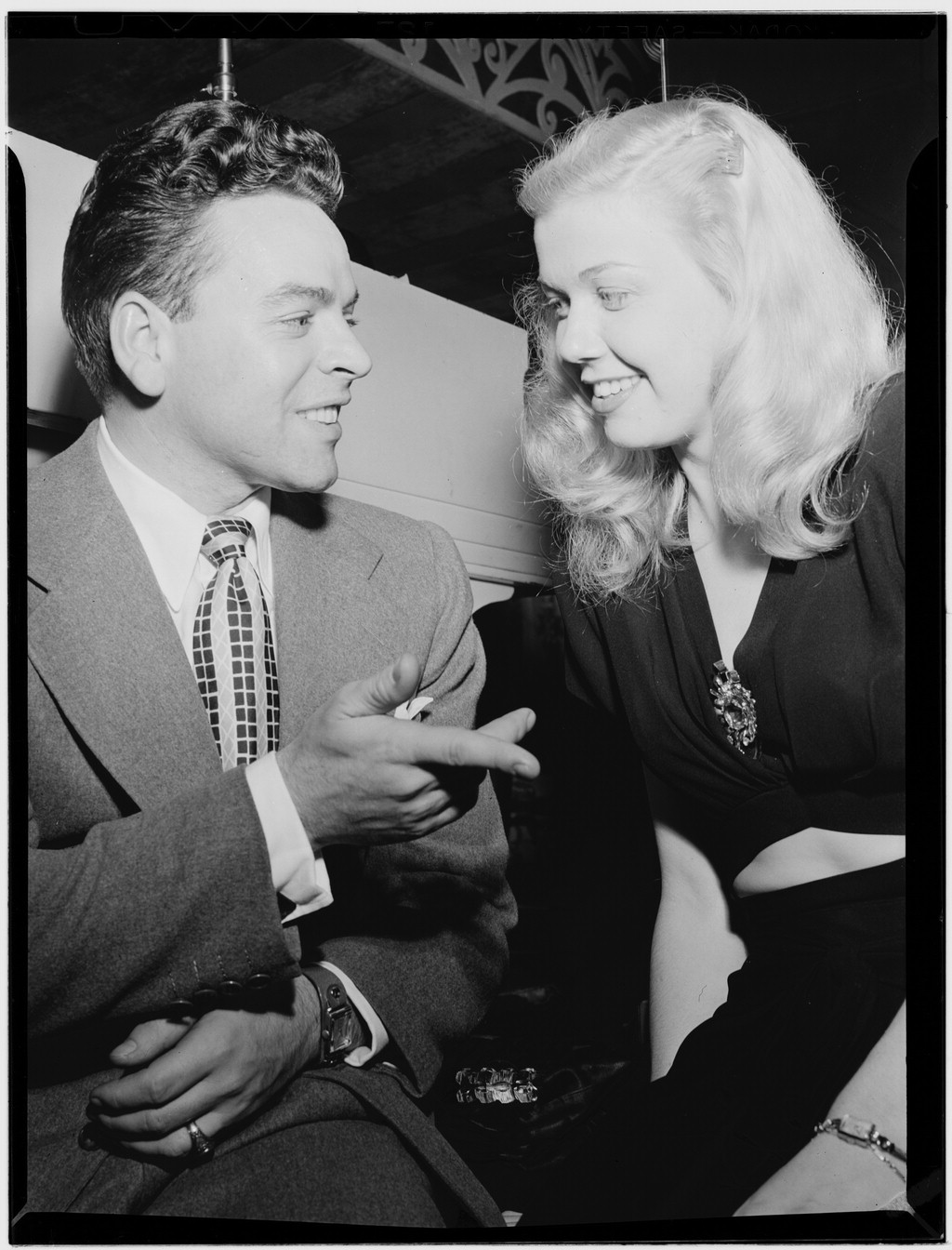
Les Brown with Doris Day (July, 1946)

Lester Raymond Brown (March 14, 1912 – January 4, 2001) was an American jazz musician who for more than six decades (1938–2000) led his big band, later called Les Brown and His Band of Renown.

== Biography ==
Brown was born in Reinerton, Pennsylvania. His family moved to Lykens, Pennsylvania, where he attended school through ninth grade. He enrolled in the Conway Military Band School (later part of Ithaca College) in 1926, studying with famous bandleader Patrick Conway for three years, before receiving a music scholarship to the New York Military Academy, where he graduated in 1932. Brown attended college at Duke University from 1932 to 1936. There he led the group Les Brown and His Blue Devils, who performed regularly on Duke's campus and up and down the east coast. Brown took the band on an extensive summer tour in 1936. At the end of the tour, while some of the band members returned to Duke to continue their education, others stayed on with Brown and continued to tour, becoming in 1938 the Les Brown Orchestra. The band's original drummer, Don Kramer, became the acting manager and helped define their future.

The band appeared regularly on the Spotlight Band radio programme, which broadcast to a military audience and made them permanent favorites of millions of men in uniform. Also on this show, the band was first referred to as "Les Brown & His Band of Renown" in 1942. The moniker stuck and became the official bandname from the 1950s onwards.

In 1941, Brown's band had a number-one hit, "Joltin' Joe DiMagio", with his lead vocalist Betty Bonney. In 1942, Brown and his band concluded work on an RKO picture, Sweet and Hot; played at the Palladium Ballroom, Hollywood. A few years later, in 1945, the band brought Doris Day into prominence with its recording of "Sentimental Journey". The song's release coincided with the end of World War II in Europe and became an unofficial homecoming theme for many veterans. The band had nine other number-one hit songs, including "I've Got My Love to Keep Me Warm" (1949).

In 1952–53, Brown was the orchestra leader on Day's radio program, The Doris Day Show, on CBS.

Les Brown and the Band of Renown performed with Bob Hope on radio, stage and television for almost fifty years. They did 18 USO Tours for American troops around the world, and entertained more than three million people. Before the Super Bowls were televised, the Bob Hope Christmas Specials were the highest-rated programs in television history. Tony Bennett was "discovered" by Bob Hope and did his first public performance with Brown and the Band.

The first film that Brown and the band appeared in was Seven Days' Leave (1942) starring Victor Mature and Lucille Ball. Rock-A-Billy Baby, a low-budget 1957 film, was the Band of Renown's second, and in 1963 they appeared in the Jerry Lewis' comedy The Nutty Professor playing their theme song "Leap Frog".

Brown and the Band were also the house band for The Steve Allen Show (1959–1961) and the Dean Martin Show (1965–1972). Brown and the band performed with virtually every major performer of their time, including Frank Sinatra, Ella Fitzgerald and Nat King Cole. The annual Les Brown Big Band Festival, started March 2006 in Les' hometown, features area big bands preserving the songs of the big band era. At the 2012 festival celebrating the 100th birthday anniversary, the town of Reinerton renamed the street near Les' birthplace to Les Brown Lane. In 2013 his hometown of Reinerton, PA adopted as the town's official slogan: Reinerton: The Town of Renown in honor of Les and his band.

Les Brown Sr. died of lung cancer in 2001, and was interred in the Westwood Village Memorial Park Cemetery in Los Angeles, California. He was survived by his wife Evelyn, son Les Jr., and daughter Denise. He was 88 years old at the time of his death.

His grandson, Jeff "Swampy" Marsh, co-created the Disney Channel animated series Phineas and Ferb and Milo Murphy's Law.

Brown was inducted into the North Carolina Music Hall of Fame in 2010.

=== Les Brown Jr. ===
In 2001, Les Brown Jr. (1940–2023), became the full-time leader of the Band of Renown. It performed throughout the world and had a regular big band show in Branson, Missouri. Brown Jr. also hosted a national radio show on the Music of Your Life network. Brown Jr. was a television actor in the 1960s (Gunsmoke, General Hospital, The Baileys of Balboa, Gilligan's Island), a rock musician and producer who worked with Carlos Santana, and a concert promoter for many country music artists including Merle Haggard and Loretta Lynn. In 2004, Brown Jr. received the "Ambassador of Patriotism" award from the POW Network. Brown Jr. died from cancer at his home in Branson, Missouri, on January 9, 2023, at the age of 82.

== Discography ==
Year	Album	Peak positions
Year	Album	US 200
1947	Sentimental Journey	5
1949	Les Brown & His Orchestra, Vol. 2	—
1950	Dance Date With Les Brown	4
1950	I Don't Know with Connee Boswell	—
1950	Martha with Connee Boswell	—
1951	Over the Rainbow	10
1953	Les Dance with Lucy Ann Polk, and The Rhythmaires	—
1953	Concert at the Palladium Vol. 1 & 2	15
1954	Live at the Hollywood Palladium	—
1954	Le's Dream	—
1955	The Cool Classics	—
1956	Dancer's Choice	—
1957	Les Brown & His Band of Renown	—
1957	Swing Song Book	—
1958	Concert Modern	—
1959	Live at Elitch Gardens 1959	—
1959	The Les Brown Story: His Greatest Hits in Today's Sound	—
1959	Stereophonic Suite for Two Bands (with Vic Schoen and His Orchestra)	—
1961	The Lerner and Loewe Bandbook	—
1963	Play Hits From The Sound of Music, My Fair Lady, Camelot, and Others	—
1966	A Sign of the Times	—
1976	Today	—
1977	Goes Direct to Disc	—
1986	Digital Swing	—
1994	Anything Goes	—
1995	America Swings	—
1995	Bandland / Revolution in Sound	—
2001	Radio Days Live	—
2003	Sentimental Thing with Bing Crosby & Billy Eckstine	—
2005	Palladium Concert 1953 (reissue)	—
2006	The Les Brown All-Stars	—
2016	The One and Only	—

== Musical short films ==
- Spreadin' the Jam (1945), dir: Charles Walters
- Les Brown (1948) (10 min), dir: Jack Scholl
- Les Brown and His Band of Renown (1949) (15 min), dir: Will Cowan
- Art Lund-Tex Beneke-Les Brown (1948) (10 min), dir: Jack Scholl
- Connee Boswell and Les Brown's Orchestra (1950) (15 min), dir: Will Cowan
- Crazy Frolic (1953) (19 min), dir: Will Cowan
- Dance Demons (1957) (14 min), dir: Will Cowan
- Rockabilly Baby (1957) (81 min), dir: William F.Claxton

== Television ==
- Bob Hope Show (1945), NBC Radio
- Bob Hope Show (1959–1966), NBC
- The Steve Allen Show (1958–1960), NBC
- The New Steve Allen Show (1961), NBC
- Hennesey (1962), CBS
- Hollywood Palace (1964), NBC
- Bob Hope Thanksgiving Show (1964), NBC
- Dean Martin Show (1965), NBC
- Dean Martin Summer Show (1966), NBC
- Rowan and Martin at the Movies (1968), NBC
- Rowan & Martin's Laugh-In (1968), NBC
- Dean Martin and the Golddigger's (1968), NBC
- The Christmas Songs (Mel Torme, host)(1972), PBS
- Bob Hope Special: Joys (1976), NBC
- The Good Old Days of Radio (1976), NBC
- Doris Day's Best Friends (1985), NBC
- Ooh-La-La, It's Bob Hope's Fun Birthday Special from Paris (1981), NBC
- Biography: Doris Day "It's Magic" (1985)
- Rocko’s Modern Life
