= Wiconisco Creek =

River in Pennsylvania

Coordinates: 40.60033°N 76.48866°W

Wiconisco Creek is a tributary of the Susquehanna River in Schuylkill and Dauphin counties, Pennsylvania, in the United States. It is approximately 45.5 miles (73.2 km) long.

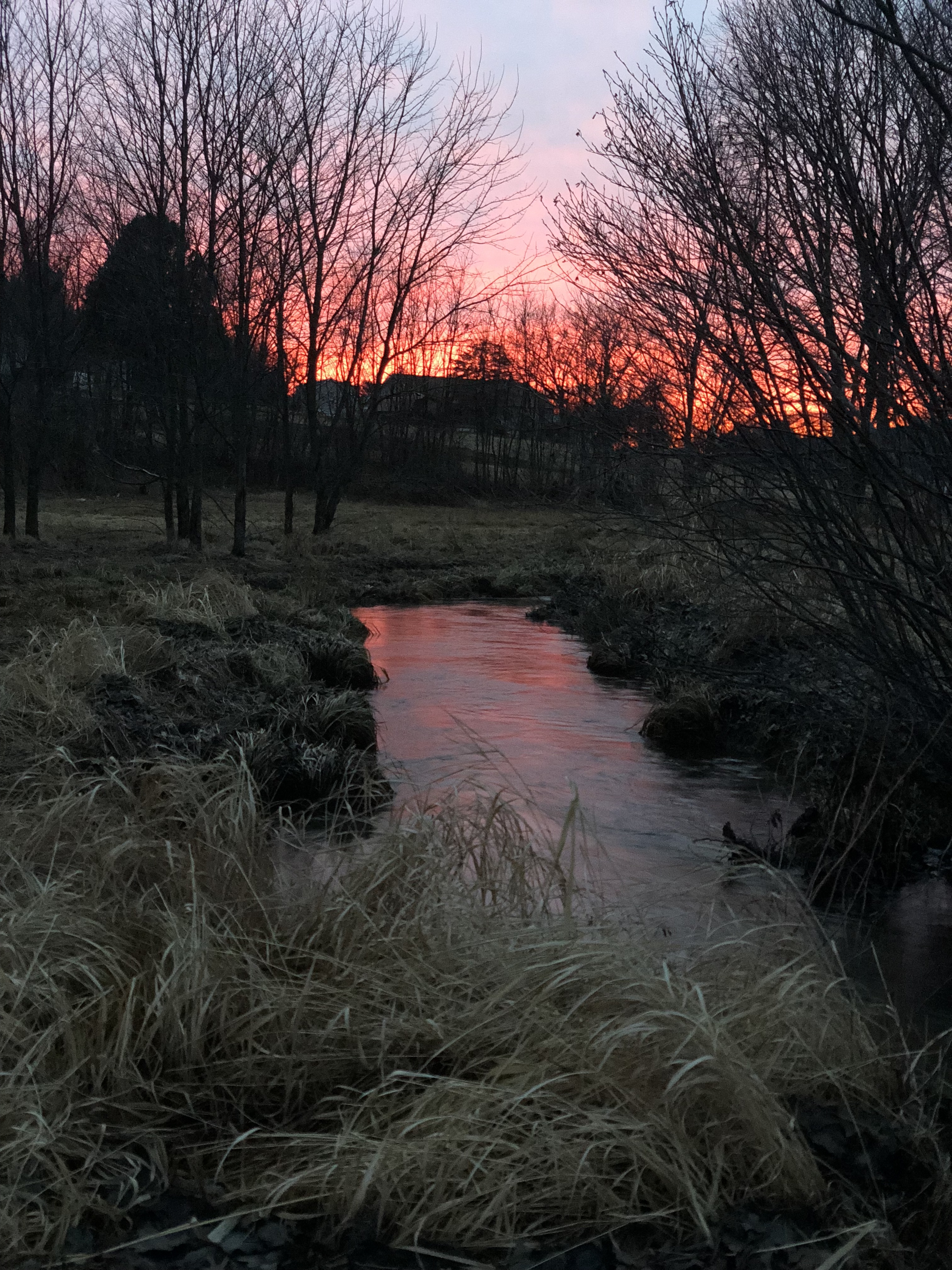
Wiconisco Creek in Porter Township, just south of Tower City, in winter.

== Course ==
Wiconisco Creek begins on a bend on a mountain in Porter Township, Schuylkill County. It flows in the general direction of west-southwest for several miles between two mountains, Big Lick Mountain, which is north of the creek and Stony Mountain, which is south of the creek. The creek passes near Tower City, where the southern border of its valley is defined by Berry Mountain, and shortly afterwards leaves Schuylkill County.

Upon leaving Schuylkill County, Wiconisco Creek enters Williams Township, Dauphin County. In this township, the creek continues in a westward direction, crossing U.S. Route 209 and passing Williamstown. Further on, the creek enters Wiconisco Township, where it passes by the community of Lykens. Here, it receives the tributary Bear Creek and then the tributary Rattling Creek. Wiconisco Creek then leaves Wiconisco Township and enters Washington Township, where it picks up the tributaries Big Run and Canoe Gap Run. The creek then reaches the end of its valley and turns abruptly north, crossing U.S. Route 209 again. It briefly enters Lykens Township before starting to meander southwest back into Washington Township. Here, the creek crosses Pennsylvania Route 225 and continues meandering in the same direction. It crosses U.S. Route 209 again and enters Upper Paxton Township, where it begins to meander parallel to Berry Mountain. After a while, the creek stops meandering, but continues west, receiving the tributary Little Wiconisco Creek. The creek then reaches its confluence with the Susquehanna River between Lenkerville and Millersburg.

Wiconisco Creek reaches its confluence with the Susquehanna River 97.99 miles (157.70 km) upstream of its mouth.

=== Tributaries ===
Tributaries of Wiconisco Creek include Little Wiconisco Creek, Keefers Run, Big Run, Rattling Creek, and Bear Creek. Rattling Creek is the largest of these tributaries, with a watershed area of 19.6 square miles (51 km^{2}). Little Wiconisco Creek is the second-largest tributary. Its watershed has an area of 17.1 square miles (44 km^{2}). The smallest tributary of Wiconisco Creek is Big Run, whose watershed has an area of 1.0 square mile (2.6 km^{2}). Additionally, the tributary Rattling Creek has a number of sub-tributaries.

== Hydrology ==
Wiconisco Creek is considered by the Pennsylvania Department of Environmental Protection to be impaired by abandoned mine drainage, wastewater, and agriculture. Approximately half of the main stem and large parts of Little Wiconisco Creek are considered to be impaired. The creek's water quality is degraded by Bear Creek and three tunnels: the Big Lick Tunnel, Keffer's Tunnel, and the Porter Tunnel.

The concentration of iron in the waters of Wiconisco Creek ranges from 0.41 to 1.7 milligrams per liter (where detected), depending on the site. The daily load ranges from 66.14 to 753.73 pounds (30.00 to 341.89 kg). The concentration of manganese in the waters of the creek ranges from 0.23 to 0.94 milligrams per liter (where detected), depending on the site. The daily load ranges from 40.63 to 203.95 pounds (18.43 to 92.51 kg). The concentration of aluminum in the creek ranges from 0.6 to 1.27 milligrams per liter (where detected), depending on the site. The daily load ranges from 54.9 to 86.22 pounds (24.90 to 39.11 kg). The concentration of acidity ranges from 27.47 to 48.3 milligrams per liter, depending on the site. The daily load ranges from 1,852.28 to 21,167.71 pounds (840.18 to 9,601.51 kg). The concentration of alkalinity ranges from 3.2 to 70.17 milligrams per liter, depending on the site. The daily load ranges from 138.33 to 13,796.13 pounds (62.75 to 6,257.82 kg).

== Geography, geology, and climate ==
The elevation near the mouth of Wiconisco Creek is 380 feet (120 m) above sea level. The highest elevation in the watershed is 1,785 feet (544 m) above sea level. This occurs on Big Lick Mountain. From river mile 37.5 to the mouth, the elevation of the creek decreases at a rate of 11.4 feet (3.5 m) per mile.

Some strainers are situated on Wiconisco Creek between Lykens and Loyalton. The creek flows through a gorge for several miles in its lower reaches. It is a relatively small creek upstream of Lykens.

The channel of Wiconisco Creek is tortuous. The creek flows through rock formations made of sandstone and shale. Deposits of anthracite occur in the watershed. The main rock formation in the watershed is the Mauch Chunk Formation. Other rock formations include the Duncannon Member of the Catskill Formation, the Llewellyn Formation, the Pocono Formation, the Pottsville Formation, and the Spechty Kopf Formation.

The Pocono Formation occurs in the southern part of the Wiconisco Creek watershed and also on the northwestern edge. The Llewellyn Formation and the Pottsville Group occur in the northeastern part of the watershed. The Pottsville Group is also found in the watershed's southeastern portion. The Spechty Kopf Formation and the Duncannon Member of the Catskill Formation occur in small areas in its southernmost portion. The rest of the watershed is on the Mauch Chunk Formation.

The Hazleton-Dekalb-Lehew soil association occurs in the southern, northeastern, and northwestern parts of the Wiconisco Creek watershed. A minute area near the mouth of the creek is occupied by soil of the Duncannon-Urban-Land-Chavies association. The rest of the watershed is occupied by the Leck Kill-Minersville-Calvin soil association.

The annual rate of precipitation in the watershed of Wiconisco Creek ranges between 40 inches (100 cm) and 50 inches (130 cm).

== Watershed ==
The watershed of Wiconisco Creek has an area of 116 square miles (300 km^{2}). The watershed of the creek is situated in southwestern Schuylkill County and northern Dauphin County. The watershed is on several United States Geological Survey 7.5 minute quadrangles: the Elizabethville quadrangle, the Lykens quadrangle, the Millersburg quadrangle, the Pine Grove quadrangle, and the Tower City quadrangle.

Numerous boroughs and villages are situated in the watershed of Wiconisco Creek. Boroughs in the western part of the watershed include Berrysburg, Elizabethville, and Millersburg. Boroughs in the central part of the watershed include Lykens, Gratz, and Wiconisco and boroughs in the watershed's eastern portion include Tower City and Williamstown. Villages in the eastern part of the watershed include Muir, Orwin, Reinerton, and Sheridan. Villages in the central part of the watershed include Big Run, Dayton, and Loyalton and villages in the watershed's western section include Cloverly Acres, Pleasant Hills, and Reservoir Heights.

Major roads in the watershed of Wiconisco Creek include U.S. Route 209 and also Pennsylvania Route 225 and Pennsylvania Route 325. A large number of township roads are also found in the watershed.

Almost all of the southern part and northern and northwestern edges of the watershed of Wiconisco Creek is forested land, including Pennsylvania State Game Lands. Nearly all of the western part of the watershed is agricultural land. Abandoned mining land is found in patches in the watershed's eastern half. Most of the watershed's population centers are found in a band running through the central part of the watershed from east to west.

== History, etymology, and industries ==
The name of Wiconisco Creek comes from a Native American word meaning "wet and dirty camp".

Coal mining (both strip mining and deep mining) is done in the upper reaches of the watershed of Wiconisco Creek, and has been since the late 1800s. There are six active mining permits in the watershed. The remains of a dam are located in the lower reaches.

In the early 1900s, the Pennsylvania Railroad followed Wiconisco Creek between its mouth and Williamstown. The Philadelphia and Reading Railroad followed the creek from its headwaters as far as Lykens.

== Biology ==
Groves of hemlock can be found on Wiconisco Creek, as can alder trees.

Wiconisco Creek is designated as a warmwater fishery in Dauphin County.

== Recreation ==
It is possible, but not recommended, to canoe on 34 miles (55 km) of Wiconisco Creek. There are Class 1 and Class 2 rapids on the creek near the communities of Lykens and Loyalton, it is recommended to avoid this area on canoe or kayak. Edward Gertler describes the scenery as "poor to good" in his book Keystone Canoeing.

== See also ==
- List of rivers of Pennsylvania
