= Muir, Pennsylvania =

Unincorporated community in Pennsylvania, US

Coordinates: 40°35′33″N 76°31′07″W

- Census-designated place
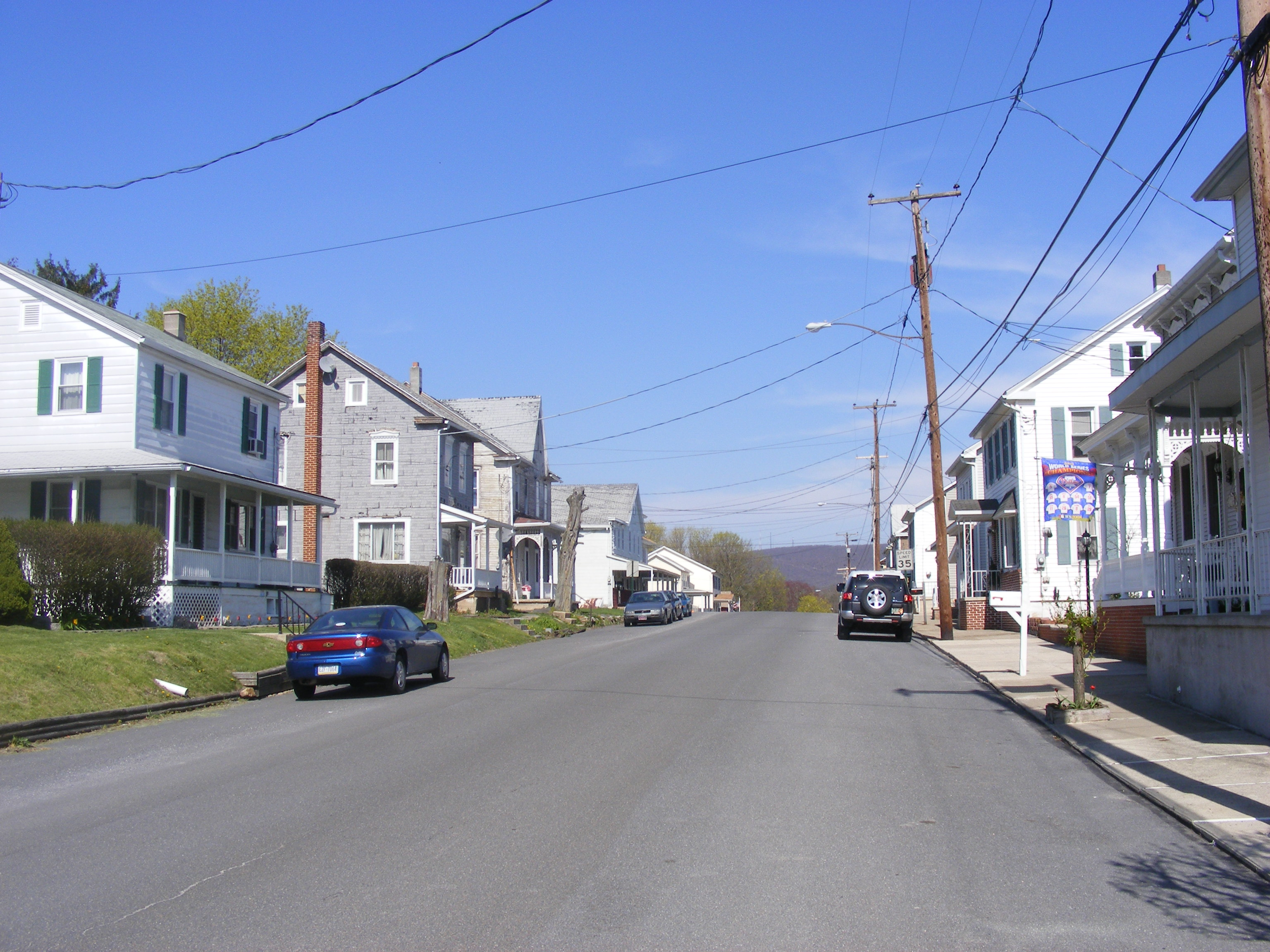
- Photo along Wiconisco Avenue
- Interactive map of Muir, Pennsylvania
- Country: United States
- State: Pennsylvania
- County: Schuylkill

Area
  - Total: 0.50 sq mi (1.29 km^{2})
  - Land: 0.50 sq mi (1.29 km^{2})
  - Water: 0 sq mi (0.00 km^{2})

Population (2020)
  - Total: 429
  - Density: 863.9/sq mi (333.55/km^{2})
- Time zone: UTC-5 (Eastern (EST))
  - Summer (DST): UTC-4 (EDT)
- FIPS code: 42-52224

Muir is a census-designated place located in Porter Township, Schuylkill County in the state of Pennsylvania, United States. Muir was part of the Reinerton-Orwin-Muir CDP at the 2000 census before splitting into three individual CDPs for the 2010 census. The other communities, along with Muir are Reinerton and Orwin. The community is located near the borough of Tower City along U.S. Route 209. As of the 2020 census, the population was 429.

== Demographics ==
Historical population
Census	Pop.	Note	%±
2020	429		—
U.S. Decennial Census

== Education ==
The school district is Williams Valley School District.
