= 213th Regional Support Group (United States) =

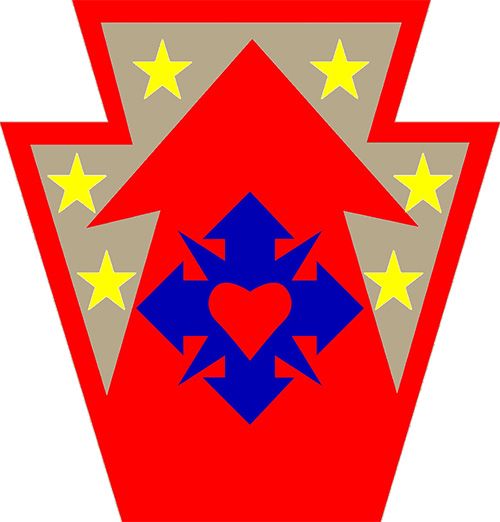
- 213th Regional Support Group shoulder sleeve insignia
- Active: 6 August 1849 – present
- Country: United States
- Branch: United States Army National Guard
- Type: Support group
- Role: Provide command and control of assigned units
- Size: 1687
- Part of: Pennsylvania Army National Guard
- Garrison/HQ: Allentown, Pennsylvania;
- Motto: "Honor First!"
- Colors: Buff and scarlet
- Engagements: Civil War; Spanish–American War; World War I World War II; Gulf War; War on terror
- Battle honours: Meritorious Unit Commendation (Army)

Insignia
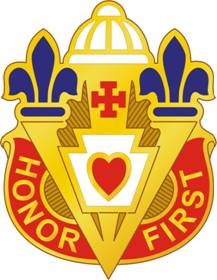
- 213th RSG's Distinctive Unit Insignia

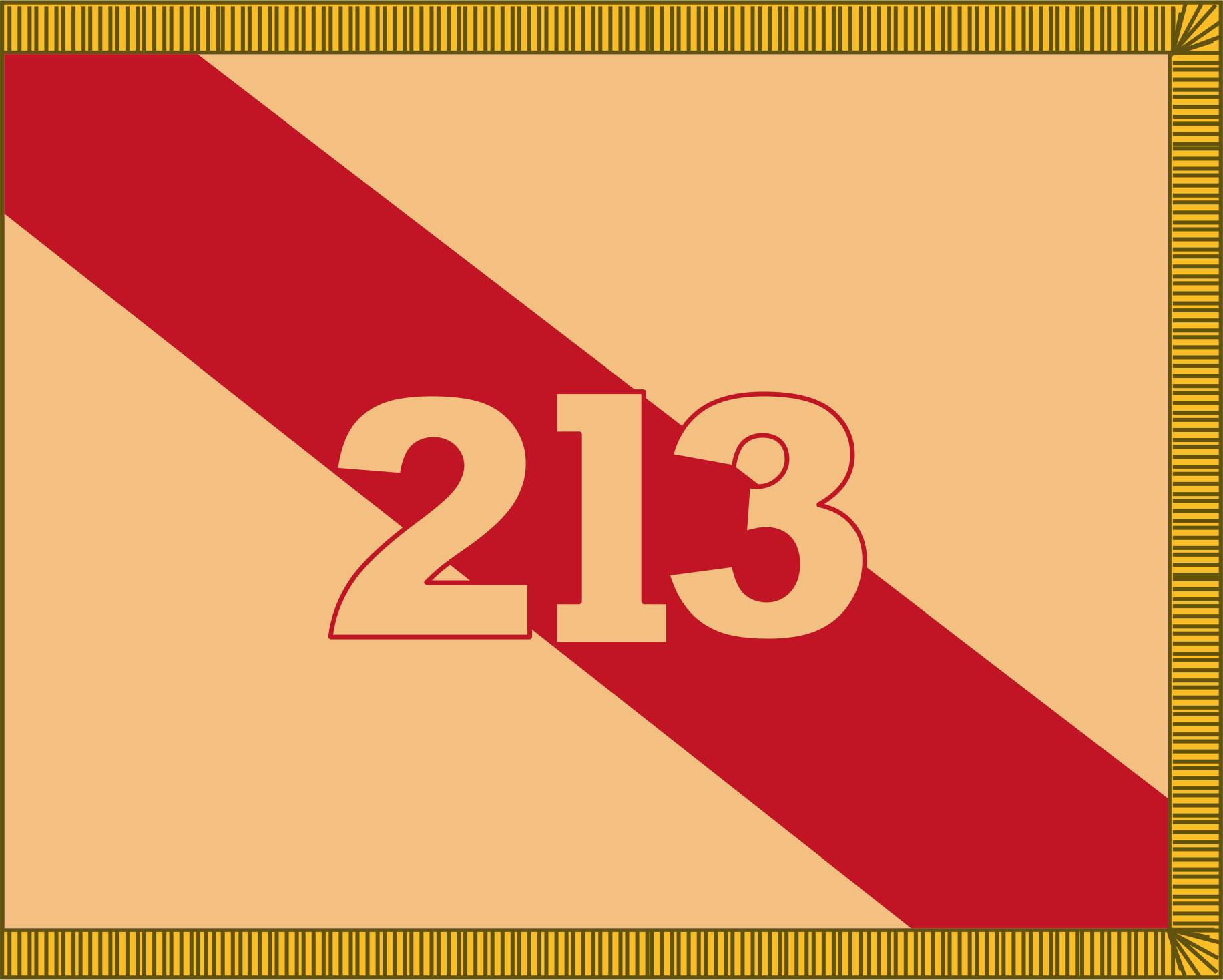
- 213th Regional Support Group Flag

The 213th Regional Support Group (213th RSG) is a unit of the Pennsylvania Army National Guard (PA ARNG). The 213th RSG mission is to provide command and control of the twenty-two separate Pennsylvania Army National Guard units assigned to the headquarters for operational and administrative control. This force consist of more than 1,000 soldiers from the eastern and central parts of the state. The 213th RSG is one of the two major commands in the Pennsylvania Army National Guard, the other being the 28th Infantry Division (Keystone).

== History ==
The Group traces antecedents to 1849, but the designation '213th Support Group' did not appear until 1975, and the '213th Regional Support Group' until 2011. The 1st and 2nd Battalions, 176th Air Defense Artillery, were part of the 218th Artillery Group (AD) from 1 June 1959 to 1 April 1963, after which the 2-176 joined the 213th Artillery Group (Air Defense) until 17 February 1968, and thereafter until 1974 just with the PA ARNG.

Headquarters and Headquarters Battery, 213th Artillery Group was converted and re-designated 1 December 1971 as Headquarters and Headquarters Detachment, 213th Military Police Group, and then, four years later, again converted and re-designated 1 April 1975 as Headquarters and Headquarters Company, 213th Support Group.

The units of the 213th Group continually provide support to units and organizations throughout the United States and the world. In 2009, the Group provided abbreviated Reception, Staging, and Onward Integration services for the G-20 Summit in Pittsburgh, Pennsylvania, processing over 2,500 troops into the Area of Responsibility. In 2007–2008 the Group deployed to Balad, Iraq in support of Operation Iraqi Freedom. During this mission, it served as one of five sustainment brigades assigned to the 316th Expeditionary Sustainment Command headquartered in Coraopolis, Pennsylvania. In 2005, immediately after Hurricane Katrina made landfall, the Group quickly deployed to Metairie, New Orleans in support of Katrina Relief, acting as a command and control for the Intermediate Staging Base at Zephyr Stadium. A tour in Afghanistan from 2003–2004 found the area support group providing command and control for bases in Bargram, Kandahar, and Kabal, Afghanistan along with an additional command and control cell in Uzbekistan.

In 1996 the group provided combat service support to an active-duty brigade during a field training exercise at the Joint Readiness Training Center, Fort Polk, Louisiana. In 1997, the group Headquarters Company sent 50 members to Hungary to support the Stabilisation Force in Bosnia and Herzegovina (S-FOR). Throughout the past decade, Group subordinate units have performed yeoman's work in fighting the war on terror. During blizzards, floods and civil emergencies, all the units of the Group stand ready to assist the communities and people of the Commonwealth. In 2026, elements of the 213 RSG deployed in support of Operation Atlantic Resolve, to deliver equipment and supplies to forward areas.

== Missions ==
=== Federal ===
The mission of the 213th Regional Support Group is to provide command and control, structure for non-major combat operations, and assist assigned Active Component or Reserve Component units in meeting training, readiness and deployment requirements.

=== State ===
Provide command and control, assist assigned units in meeting training, readiness and deployment requirements. Support State Emergency Operations as required, and operate Logistics Base Operations at multiple locations.

== Organization ==
- 213th Regional Support Group, in Allentown
  - Headquarters and Headquarters Company, 213th Regional Support Group, in Allentown
  - 108th Medical Company (Area Support), in Allentown
  - 109th Mobile Public Affairs Detachment, at Fort Indiantown Gap
  - 213th Human Resources Company, at Fort Indiantown Gap
  - 28th Finance Battalion, in Lebanon
    - Headquarters and Headquarters Detachment, 28th Finance Battalion, in Lebanon
    - 528th Finance Company, in Lebanon
    - 828th Finance Company, in Lebanon
    - 928th Finance Company, in Lebanon
  - 228th Transportation Battalion (Motor), at Fort Indiantown Gap
    - 121st Transportation Company (Medium Truck) (Cargo), at Johnstown–Cambria County Airport
      - Detachment 1, 121st Transportation Company (Medium Truck) (Cargo), at Fort Indiantown Gap
    - 131st Transportation Company (Medium Truck) (Cargo), in Williamstown
      - Detachment 1, 131st Transportation Company (Medium Truck) (Cargo), in Lehighton
  - 728th Division Support Sustainment Battalion, in Spring City
    - Headquarters and Headquarters Company, 728th Division Sustainment Support Battalion, in Spring City
    - Company A (Composite Supply Company), 728th Division Sustainment Support Battalion, in Philadelphia
    - Company B (Support Maintenance Company), 728th Division Sustainment Support Battalion, at Fort Indiantown Gap
    - Company C (Composite Truck Company), 728th Division Sustainment Support Battalion, in Phoenixville
      - Detachment 1, Company C (Composite Truck Company), 728th Division Sustainment Support Battalion, in Philadelphia
      - Detachment 2, Company C (Composite Truck Company), 728th Division Sustainment Support Battalion, at Fort Indiantown Gap

== Lineage ==
- HHD/ 213th Regional Support Group
- Organized 6 August 1849 in the Pennsylvania militia at Allentown as the Lehigh Fencibles. Re-designated 10 July 1850 as the Allen rifles. Consolidated 18 April 1861 with the Jordan Artillerists and consolidated unit reorganized and re-designated as the Union Rifles.
- Mustered into Federal service 20 April 1861 at Harrisburg, Pennsylvania as Company I, 1st Pennsylvania Volunteer Infantry Regiment; mustered out of Federal service 27 July 1861 at Harrisburg.
- Former Allen Rifles reorganized and mustered into Federal service 30 August 1861 at Harrisburg as Company B, 47th Pennsylvania Volunteer Infantry Regiment; mustered out of Federal service 25 December 1865
- Reorganized 3 June 1870 in the Pennsylvania National Guard at Allentown as the Allen Rifles. Re-designated 30 June 1874 as Company D, 4th Infantry Regiment.
- Mustered into Federal service 8 July 1899 at Allentown as Company D, 4th Infantry Regiment *Mustered into Federal service 27 July 1916 at Mount Gretna; mustered out of Federal service 5 August 1917. Reorganized and re-designated 11 October 1917 as Company, 109th Machine Gun Battalion, an element of the 28th Division. Demobilized 4 May 1919 at Camp Dix, New Jersey.
- Reorganized 24 March 1921 in the Pennsylvania National Guard at Allentown as Company D, 3rd Separate Battalion of Infantry; federally recognized 8 April 1921. Converted and re-designated 1 May 1922 as Headquarters Detachment and Combat Train, 1st Battalion, 213th Artillery (Antiaircraft). Re-designated 1 August 1924 as headquarters Detachment and Combat Train, 1st Battalion, 213th Coast Artillery. Reorganized and re-designated 1 April 1939 as Headquarters Battery, 213th Coast Artillery.
- Inducted into Federal service 16 September 1940 at Allentown. Reorganized and Federally recognized 9 October 1946 at Allentown.
- Consolidated 1 June 1959 with the 151st Antiaircraft Artillery Detachment and consolidated unit re-designated as Headquarters and Headquarters Battery, 213th Artillery Group. Converted and re-designated 1 December 1971 as Headquarters and Headquarters Detachment, 213th Military Police Group Converted and re-designated 1 April 1975 as Headquarters and Headquarters Company, 213th Support Group.
- HHC (-Det 1), 213th Area Support Group ordered into active Federal service on 7 January 1997 in support of Operation Joint Endeavor/Guard HHC (-Det 1), 213th Area Support Group released from active Federal service on 2 October 1997.
- Headquarters and Headquarters Company, 213th Area Support Group mobilized and ordered into active Federal service on 15 March 2003 at Allentown in support of Operation Enduring Freedom. Trained at Fort Dix, New Jersey and then deployed, serving in Afghanistan and Uzbekistan. Released from active Federal Service and returned to Fort Dix on 18 April 2004.
- Headquarters and Headquarters Company, 213th Area Support Group mobilized and ordered into active Federal service on 23 April 2007 at Allentown in support of Operation Iraqi Freedom. Trained at Fort Bragg, North Carolina and then deployed to Kuwait and Iraq. Released from active Federal service and returned to Fort Bragg on 13 April 2008.
- Headquarters and Headquarters Company, 213th Area Support Group reorganized 1 September 2011 as Headquarters and Headquarters Detachment, 213th Regional Support Group.

== Honors ==
=== Campaign participation credit ===
The 213th Regional Support Group has the following campaign participation credit.

- Civil War
1. Shenandoah
2. Florida 1862
3. South Carolina 1862
4. Louisiana 1864
- War with Spain
1. Puerto Rico
- World War I
1. Champagne-Marne
2. Aisne-Marne
3. Oise-Aisne
4. Meuse-Argonne
5. Champagne 1918
6. Lorraine 1918
- World War II
1. Tunisia
2. Naples-Foggia
3. Rome-Arno
4. Normandy
5. Northern France
6. Southern France
7. Rhineland
8. Central Europe
- Southwest Asia
1. Defense of Saudi Arabia
2. Liberation and Defense of Kuwait
3. Cease-Fire
- War on Terrorism
1. Iraq: Iraqi Surge
2. Afghanistan: Consolidation I

== Decorations ==
The 213th Regional Support Group has been awarded the following decorations.

1. Meritorious Unit Commendation (Army), Streamer embroidered SOUTHWEST ASIA 1990–1991
2. Meritorious Unit Commendation (Army), Streamer embroidered IRAQ 2007-2008

== See also ==
- 213th Air Defense Artillery Regiment (United States)
