= Williams Township, Pennsylvania =

Williams Township is the name of some places in the U.S. state of Pennsylvania:

- Williams Township, Dauphin County, Pennsylvania
- Williams Township, Northampton County, Pennsylvania
