= Williams Valley School District =

School district in Pennsylvania

Coordinates: 40.58788°N 76.60560°W

Address
- 10330 State Route 209 Tower City, Dauphin County and Schuylkill County, Pennsylvania, 17980-9801; United States

District information
- Type: Public

Students and staff
- District mascot: Vikings
- Colors: Blue, red, white

Other information
- Website: www.wvschools.net

The Williams Valley School District is a small, rural public school district located in Dauphin County, Pennsylvania and Schuylkill County, Pennsylvania. The district is highly fragmented, encompassing the boroughs of Williamstown and Tower City as well as the townships of Porter, Rush, Williams, and Wiconisco. The district encompasses approximately 62 square miles (160 km^{2}).

According to 2000 federal census data, it served a resident population of 7,355. By 2010, the district's population increased to 7,463 people. The educational attainment levels for the School District population (25 years old and over) were 86.2% high school graduates and 11.5% college graduates.

According to the Pennsylvania Budget and Policy Center, 67.1% of the district's pupils lived at 185% or below the Federal Poverty level as shown by their eligibility for the federal free or reduced price school meal programs in 2012. In 2009, the district residents’ per capita income was $16,846, while the median family income was $41,005. In the Commonwealth, the median family income was $49,501 and the United States median family income was $49,445, in 2010. In Schuylkill County, the median household income was $42,315. By 2013, the median household income in the United States rose to $52,100.

Williams Valley School District operates one elementary school and one combined junior/senior high school, which are located in Tower City and Williamstown, respectively. High school students may choose to attend Schuylkill Technology Centers for training in the construction and mechanical trades. The Schuylkill Intermediate Unit IU29 provides the district with a wide variety of services like specialized education for disabled students and hearing, speech and visual disability services and professional development for staff and faculty.

== Extracurriculars ==
The Williams Valley School District presents a diverse selection of clubs, a range of activities, and a robust sports program.

=== Athletics ===
The district has athletic teams in the following sports:

Boys

- Baseball - A
- Basketball - AA
- Football - AA
- Soccer - A
- Wrestling - AA

Girls

- Basketball - A
- Soccer (Fall) - AA
- Softball - A
- Volleyball - A

Junior High School Sports

Boys

- Basketball
- Wrestling

Girls

- Basketball
- Softball

According to PIAA directory July 2021
