= Charles Clarence Curtis =

U.S. Army major general

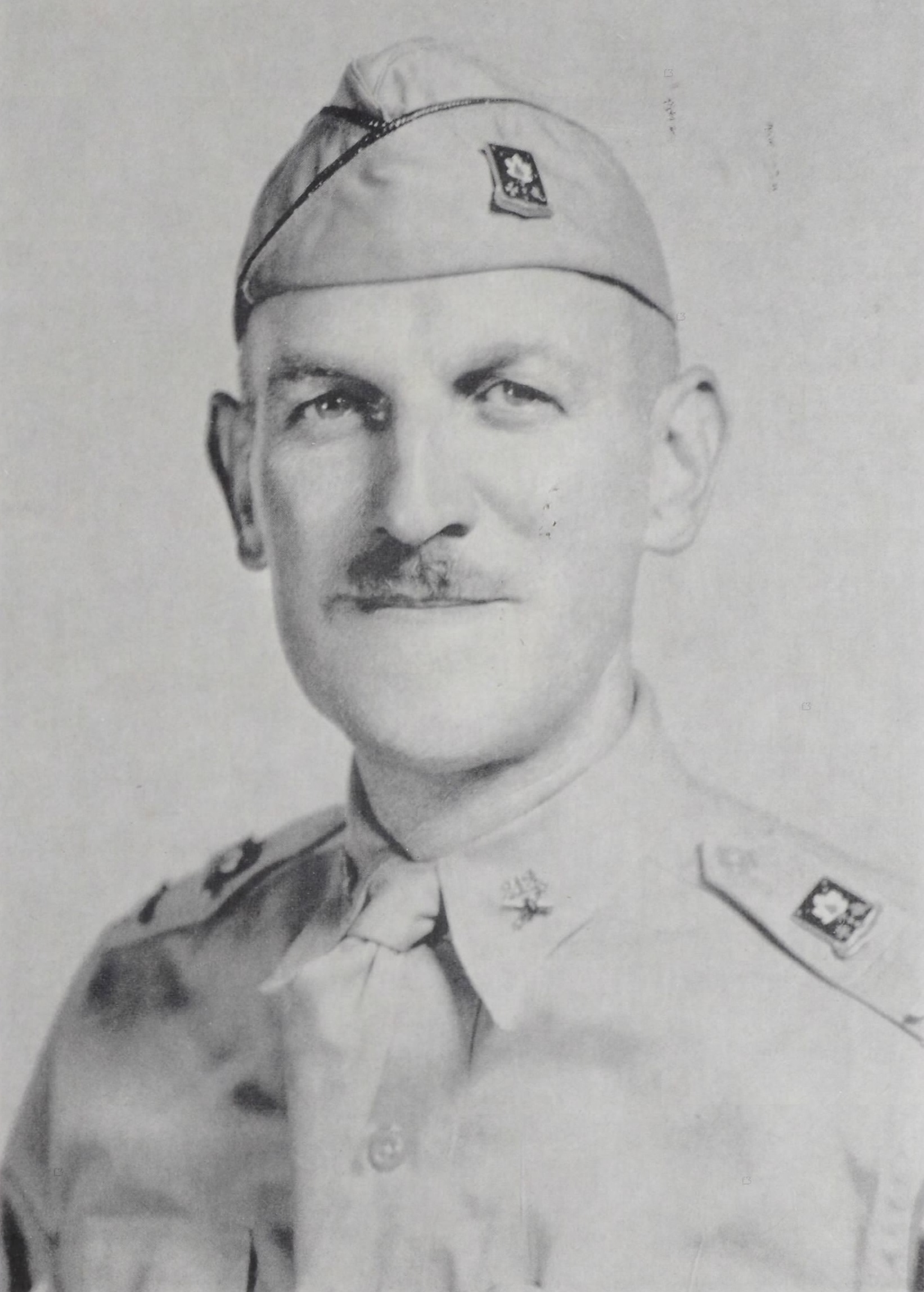
- From 1941's 213th Coast Artillery (AA) Yearbook
- Born: October 29, 1893; Wiconisco, Pennsylvania, U.S.
- Died: June 24, 1960 (aged 66); Allentown, Pennsylvania, U.S.
- Burial place: Greenwood Cemetery, Allentown, Pennsylvania, U.S.
- Spouse(s): Vivian Jane (m. 1917–1920) Clare E. Horn (m. 1921–1959)
- Children: 1
- Military career
- Service: United States Army; Pennsylvania Army National Guard
- Service years: 1917–1953
- Rank: Major General
- Service number: 0150283
- Units: U.S. Army Coast Artillery Corps; U.S. Army Infantry Branch
- Commands: 213th Coast Artillery Regiment; 33rd Coast Artillery Brigade; Fort Bliss; 51st Anti-aircraft Artillery Brigade; Pennsylvania Army National Guard; 28th Infantry Division
- Conflicts: Mexican Border War; World War I World War II
- Awards: Legion of Merit; Bronze Star Medal; Croix de guerre with palm (France); Pennsylvania Distinguished Service Medal
- Other work: Advertising Manager, The Morning Call

Charles C. Curtis (October 29, 1893 – June 24, 1960) was an American newspaper executive and military officer from Pennsylvania. The longtime advertising manager of Allentown's The Morning Call, Curtis was also a career officer in the United States Army and Pennsylvania Army National Guard, Curtis served from 1917 to 1953 and attained the rank of major general. A veteran of the Mexican Border War, World War I, and World War II, his awards included the Legion of Merit, Bronze Star Medal, and French Croix de guerre.

A native of Wiconisco, Pennsylvania, Curtis was raised and educated in Williamstown. After graduating from high school in 1909, he was employed in a drug store and as a teacher. In 1916, he joined the Pennsylvania National Guard's 4th Infantry Regiment; he was soon promoted to the noncommissioned officer ranks and assigned as regimental supply sergeant during Mexican Border War duty in Texas. During World War I, he received his second lieutenant's commission and served in France as a member of the 109th Machine Gun Battalion.

After the First World War, Curtis pursued a newspaper career as manager of the advertising department at The Morning Call in Allentown. He also continued his military career as a member of the 213th Coast Artillery Regiment. Curtis advanced through the ranks during the 1920s and 1930s, and was assigned as the regiment's commander in 1938. During World War II, he initially commanded the 213th Coast Artillery, followed by postings as commander of the 33rd Coast Artillery Brigade in San Diego, the post at Fort Bliss, Texas, and the 51st Anti-aircraft Artillery Brigade in Europe.

Following the Second World War, Curtis commanded the 51st Anti-aircraft Artillery Brigade when it was organized as a National Guard unit. In 1947, he was assigned to command the Pennsylvania Army National Guard, an assignment he carried out while continuing to command the 51st AAA Brigade. In 1953 he was appointed to command the 28th Infantry Division when it was reconstituted in the National Guard following federal service in West Germany during the Korean War. Curtis retired from the military in late 1953. He died in Allentown on June 24, 1960, and was buried at Greenwood Cemetery in Allentown.

== Early life and civilian career ==
Charles Clarence Curtis was born in Wiconisco, Pennsylvania on October 29, 1893, the son of Harrison "Harry" D. Curtis and Ellen "Ella" (Kniley) Curtis. He was raised and educated in Williamstown, and was a 1909 graduate of Williamstown High School. After graduating, Curtis was employed at a Williamstown drug store and as a school teacher.

In January 1922, Curtis began working in the advertising department of The Morning Call, Allentown's morning daily newspaper. By 1926, Curtis was the manager of the advertising department, and he continued in this position until his death. He was also active in Allentown's civic and chartable causes, including serving on the city's traffic commission, leading the public campaign to finance completion of the city's hospital, and chairing the Lehigh Valley Thruway Committee. Curtis also took part in or led activities for the Lehigh Valley Community Chest, The Salvation Army, Boy Scouts, and Rotary Club. He was long active in military and veterans activities, including committees and campaigns for the American Legion and chairman of Allentown's armory board.

== Family ==
In 1917, Curtis married Vivien Jane Moffett. They divorced in 1920, and in 1921, he married Clara Horn. With his second wife, Curtis was the father of a son, Charles Harry Curtis. Charles H. Curtis was a 1945 graduate of the United States Military Academy and a veteran of World War II, the Korean War, and the Vietnam War. He retired as a colonel and was a recipient of the Silver Star and numerous other awards and decorations.

== Start of military career ==
On June 26, 1916, Curtis joined the Pennsylvania National Guard's Company G, 4th Infantry Regiment as a private. The 4th Pennsylvania was soon called to federal service during the Mexican Border War, and performed patrol duties while based at Camp Stewart near El Paso, Texas. Curtis was soon promoted to sergeant, followed by assignment as the regimental supply sergeant. The 4th Pennsylvania completed its federal service in early 1917, and was mustered out in January 1917.

On July 15, 1917, the 4th Pennsylvania Infantry regiment was federalized for World War I. On August 4, he was commissioned as a second lieutenant, and he continued to serve with the 4th Pennsylvania until October, when it was reorganized as the 109th Machine Gun Battalion, a unit of the 28th Division. As a member of the battalion's Company A, Curtis took part in campaigns throughout the war, including Champagne-Marne, Aisne-Marne, Battle of Fismes and Fismette, Oise-Aisne, Meuse–Argonne offensive, and Thiaucourt. He was promoted to first lieutenant on March 6, 1919.

The 28th Division returned to the United States in June 1919 and was mustered out at Camp Dix, New Jersey. Curtis then served with the 50th Infantry Regiment, followed by a posting to the 45th Infantry Regiment. He was discharged on October 31, 1919, and returned to Allentown. On March 16, 1920, he was commissioned as a first lieutenant in the Organized Reserve Corps. On August 14, he transferred his military membership to the Pennsylvania National Guard and was appointed adjutant of the 3rd Separate Battalion. A post-war reorganization of the National Guard resulted in the 1922 creation of the 213th Coast Artillery Regiment (Anti-aircraft), and Curtis was assigned to the regiment's Battery B.

== Continued military career ==
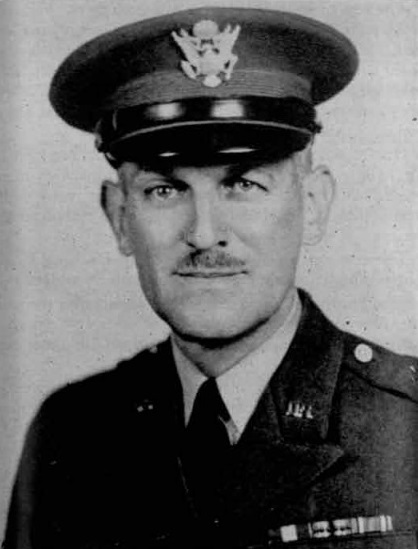
Curtis after being called to federal active duty in 1950

On August 13, 1924, Curtis was promoted to captain and assigned as the 213th Coast Artillery's plans and training officer (S-3). On June 22, 1936, Curtis was promoted to major and assigned as the regimental executive officer. On February 22, 1937, he was promoted to lieutenant colonel and he continued to serve as executive officer. On July 30, 1938, Curtis was promoted to colonel and assigned as regimental commander.

Curits was still in command of the 213th Coast Artillery in 1940 when the regiment was activated in anticipation of U.S. entry into World War II. After the U.S. entered the war, Curtis was promoted to temporary brigadier general and assigned to command the 33rd Coast Artillery Brigade (Anti-aircraft Artillery), which was responsible for the aircraft defenses of the California coast near San Diego. In November 1943, Curtis was posted to Fort Bliss, Texas, where he was assigned as commander of the post. In January 1944, he became commander of the 51st Anti-aircraft Artillery Brigade, which took part in defending Allied positions in England, France, Belgium, Luxembourg, and Germany. He remained in command until the end of the war, and returned to the United States in September 1945.

After the Second World War, Curtis continued in command of the 51st Anti-aircraft Artillery Brigade, now reorganized as a unit of the Pennsylvania National Guard. He reverted to his pre-war rank of colonel in early 1946, but was then promoted to permanent brigadier general in September 1946. Then in December 1947, Curtis was promoted to major general and assigned to command the Pennsylvania Army National Guard, a post in which he served while continuing to command the 51st AAA Brigade. When the Korean War began in 1950, the 51st Anti-aircraft Artillery Brigade was called to active service and Curtis remained in command as the brigade performed stateside duties at locations including Chicago. After becoming ill, he was released from active duty in July 1951 and returned to Allentown. The 28th Infantry Division served on active duty in West Germany during the war; when it was reconstituted as a National Guard organization in May 1953, Curtis was appointed to command it. In October 1953, Curtis retired from the military.

== Death and burial ==
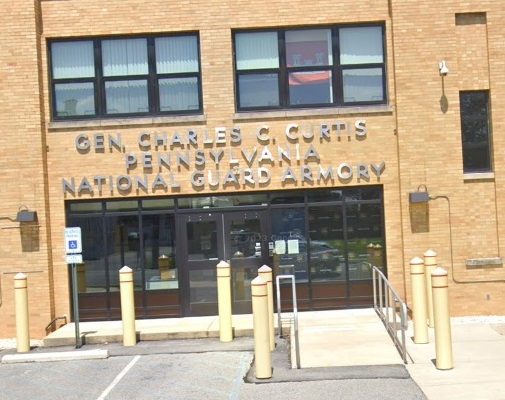
Front entrance to Charles C. Curtis Armory in Allentown

In March 1959, Curtis experienced a heart attack but recovered and continued working at The Morning Leader. In mid-June 1960, he became ill and entered Allentown's Sacred Heart Hospital for abdominal surgery. He did not recover, and died at the hospital on June 24, 1960. He was buried at Greenwood Cemetery in Allentown. In 1962, the National Guard armory in Allentown (constructed in 1938) was rededicated as the Charles C. Curtis Armory. The armory is the headquarters of the 213th Regional Support Group and the site of the 213th Regiment Museum.

== Awards ==
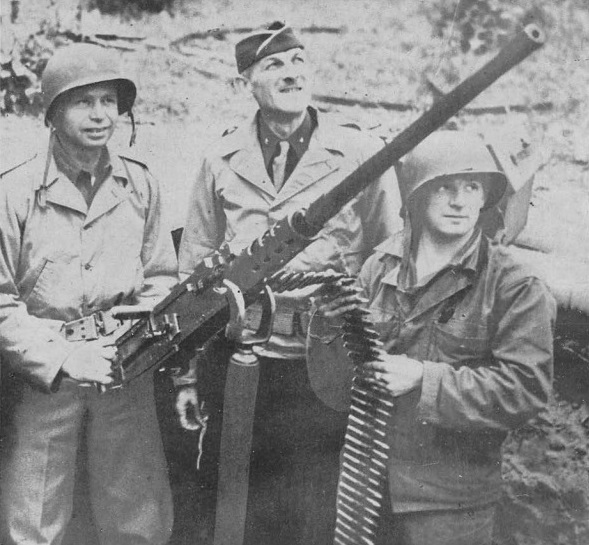
Curtis inspecting heavy barreled cal. 50 machine gun on improvised Anti-aircraft Artillery mount during World War II.

Curtis's awards and decorations included the Legion of Merit, Bronze Star Medal, and French Croix de guerre with palm. His state awards included the Pennsylvania Distinguished Service Medal.

=== Legion of Merit ===
From March 1944 through April 1945, Curtis served as commanding general of an anti-aircraft artillery brigade responsible for the protection of airfields, supply installations, and lines of communication in England, France, and Germany. During this period, the brigade defended Allied facilities and transportation networks against attacks by the Luftwaffe, including conventional aircraft, V-1 flying bombs, and jet-powered fighters. The citation for Curtis's Legion of Merit credited him with maintaining the effectiveness of the brigade's air defenses despite difficult operating conditions and with contributing to improvements in anti-aircraft artillery operations, particularly in the field of early-warning services. It also cited his leadership, professional skill, and administration of the brigade during operations in the European theater.

Curtis's award was presented by Brigadier General William L. Richardson, commander of the IX Air Defense Command, in a ceremony at Kitzingen Army Airfield, Germany.

== Effective dates of rank ==
Curtis's effective dates of rank were:

- Private to Sergeant, July 8, 1916 to August 4, 1917
- Second Lieutenant, August 5, 1917
- First Lieutenant, March 16, 1920
- Captain, August 13, 1924
- Major, June 22, 1936
- Lieutenant Colonel, February 22, 1937
- Colonel: July 30, 1938
- Brigadier General (temporary): December 17, 1941
- Colonel: January 14, 1946 (reverted back to peacetime rank)
- Brigadier General: September 30, 1946
- Major General: December 24, 1947
- Major General (retired): October 17, 1953
