= Wiconisco, Pennsylvania =

Unincorporated community in Pennsylvania, US

- Census-designated place
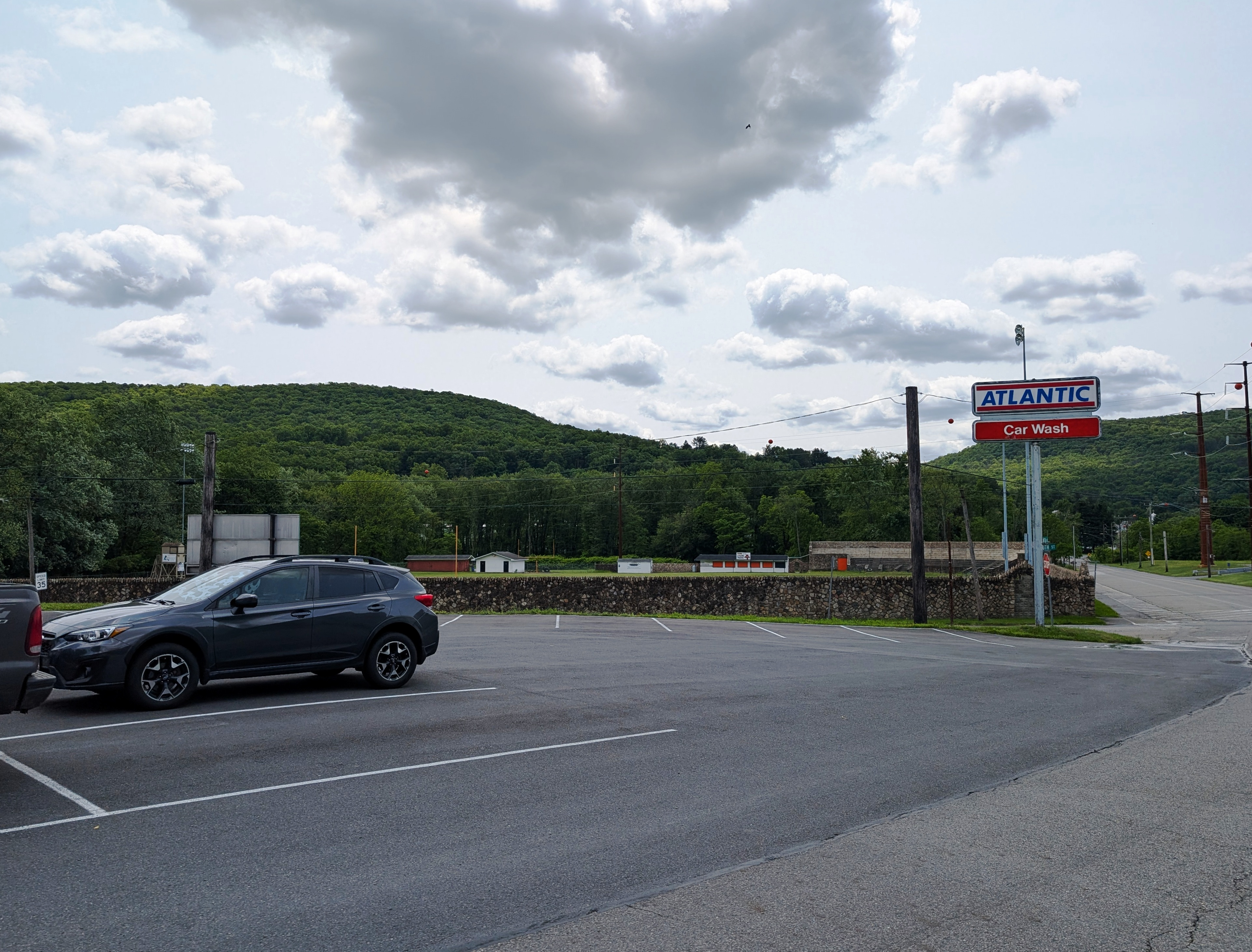
- Memorial Park, completed in 1940 under the WPA

- Location in Dauphin County and state of Pennsylvania
- Coordinates: 40°34′24″N 76°41′29″W
- Country: United States
- State: Pennsylvania
- County: Dauphin
- Township: Wiconisco

Area
  - Total: 1.09 sq mi (2.82 km^{2})
  - Land: 1.09 sq mi (2.82 km^{2})
  - Water: 0 sq mi (0.0 km^{2})
- Elevation: 738 ft (225 m)

Population (2010)
  - Total: 921
  - Density: 845/sq mi (326.1/km^{2})
- Time zone: UTC-5 (Eastern (EST))
  - Summer (DST): UTC-4 (EDT)
- ZIP code: 17097
- FIPS code: 42-84968
- GNIS feature ID: 1199792

Wiconisco is a census-designated place in Wiconisco Township, Pennsylvania, United States. Its location is just north of U.S. Route 209 and the borough of Lykens. As of the 2010 census the population was 921.

== History ==
A post office has been in operation at Wiconisco since 1835. The community took its name from Wiconisco Creek.

== Notable people ==
- Charles Clarence Curtis, U.S. Army major general
