= 213th Air Defense Artillery Regiment =

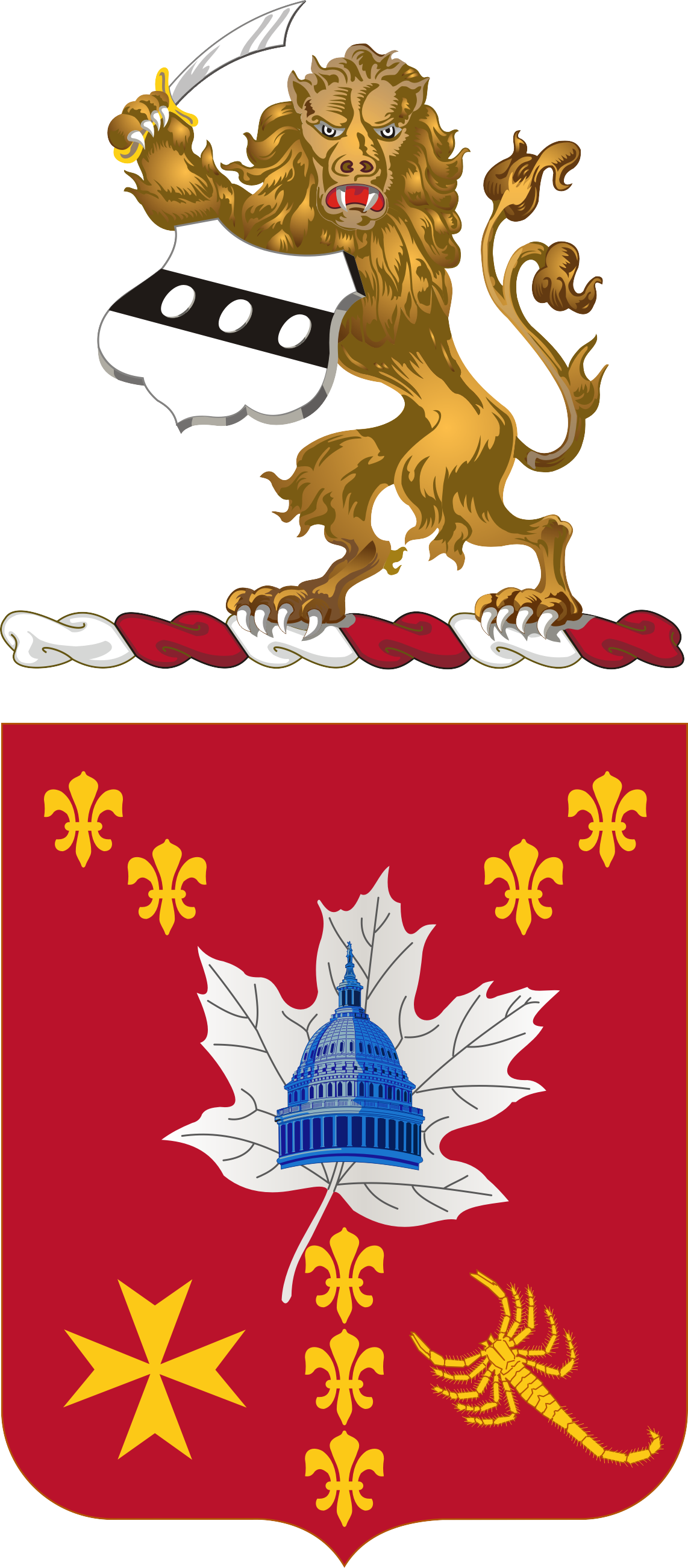
- Coat of arms
- Active: 1989 – current
- Country: United States
- Branch: Pennsylvania Army National Guard
- Type: Air Defense Artillery
- Motto(s): THE FIRST DEFENDERS
- Mascot(s): Oozlefinch

The 213th Air Defense Artillery is a regiment in the Pennsylvania Army National Guard.

The regiment appears to have been established as an Air Defense Artillery Branch unit in 1989–90, according to The Institute of Heraldry insignia data. The Reading Eagle of August 31, 1989, advertised for personnel to join Battery B of the 1st Battalion, a 'new Army National Guard unit'.

The first appearance of the number "213" was with a Coast Artillery Corps anti-aircraft regiment first established on 1 May 1922. This regiment was commanded by Charles Clarence Curtis during World War II; he later commanded the Pennsylvania Army National Guard as a major general. Major General John E. Stevens led the creation of the 1st Battalion, 213th ADA from the previous 165th Military Police Battalion, with the new unit seemingly established in August 1989.

By October 1, 1997, it was part of the 28th Infantry Division.

== Lineage ==
Constituted on 14 May 1874 as the 4th Infantry Regiment, Pennsylvania. Organized on 30 June 1874 from existing independent companies of the 5th and 7th Divisions, Pennsylvania National Guard. consisting of companies in Allentown, Hamburg, Columbia, Reading, Pinegrove and Pottsville.

- mustered into federal service from 9 May-6 July 1898 as the 4th Regiment, Pennsylvania Volunteer Infantry and mustered out of federal service 16 November 1898 and reorganized as the 4th Infantry Regiment, Pennsylvania National Guard.
- mustered into federal service on 8 July 1916 for Mexican border duty, and mustered out of federal service 15–26 January 1917.
- mustered into federal service on 16–27 July 1917.
- reorganized and redesignated between 15 August 1917 – 21 March 1918 as the 107th, 108th and 109th Machine Gun Battalions, 28th Division, and as the 149th Machine Gun Battalion and elements of the 150th and 151st Machine Gun Battalions, 42nd Division. demobilized during May 1919.
- reorganized between 9 July 1920 – 8 April 1921 as 1st, 2nd and 3rd Separate Battalions of Infantry, Pennsylvania National Guard.
- consolidated and redesignated 1 May 1922 as the 213th Artillery (Antiaircraft) (AA) (Coast Artillery Corps).
- redesignated on 1 August 1921 as the 213th Coast Artillery (AA)
- inducted into federal service on 15 September 1940.
- 3rd battalion constituted 27 May 1942 and organized at Bayonne, New Jersey

Regiment broken up at Castel Volturno, Italy 9 September 1943 as follows-

- HHB as HHB 213th Antiaircraft Artillery Group (See 213th Area Support Group)
- 1st Battalion as 73rd Antiaircraft Artillery Gun Battalion
- 2nd battalion as 899th Antiaircraft Artillery Automatic Weapons Battalion
- 3rd Battalion as 337th Antiaircraft Artillery Searchlight Battalion

The 213th, 337th and 899th Antiaircraft Artillery Battalions were reorganized and redesignated on 1 June 1959 as the 213th Artillery, a parent regiment under the Combat Arms Regimental System to consist of the 3rd Automatic Weapons Battalion and 4th Howitzer Battalion.

- reorganized on 24 March 1964 to consist of the 3rd Automatic Weapons Battalion and 4th Battalion.
- The unit was broken up on 17 February 1968 and withdrawn from the Combat Arms Regimental system and reorganized on 1 October 1990 under the United States Army Regimental System to consist of 1st Battalion, an element of the 28th Infantry Division (United States).

In July 2002, the 1st Battalion, 213th Air Defense Artillery, deployed to Germany, and the Netherlands and Belgium to augment active-duty forces providing enhanced security to U.S. military installations there in the wake of the September 11 terrorist attacks. This was part of a larger PA ARNG deployment known as "Task Force Keystone."

== Distinctive unit insignia ==
- Description

A Gold color metal and enamel device 1 3/16 inches (3.0 cm) in height overall consisting of a shield blazoned: Gules, on a maple leaf Argent between in pairle seven fleurs-de-lis Or, the dome of the United States Capitol Azure, in base, dexter a Maltese cross, sinister a scorpion bendwise of the third. Attached below the shield a Gold scroll inscribed “THE FIRST DEFENDERS” in Blue letters.

- Symbolism

The shield is red for Artillery. Service during the War of 1812 is indicated by the maple leaf; the Mexican War by the scorpion; the Civil War by the dome of the United States Capitol; Spanish–American War by the Maltese cross; and World War I by the seven fleurs-de-lis.

- Background

The distinctive unit insignia was originally approved for the 213th Coast Artillery Regiment on 4 June 1932. It was redesignated for the 213th Antiaircraft Artillery Gun Battalion on 26 March 1952. It was redesignated for the 213th Antiaircraft Artillery Battalion on 15 December 1954. The insignia was redesignated for the 213th Artillery Regiment on 26 July 1961. It was redesignated for the 213th Air Defense Artillery Regiment with the description revised on 8 May 1989.

== Coat of arms ==
=== Blazon ===
- Shield

Gules, on a maple leaf Argent between in pairle seven fleurs-de-lis Or, the dome of the United States Capitol Azure, in base, dexter a Maltese cross, sinister a scorpion bendwise of the third.

- Crest

That for the regiments and separate battalions of the Pennsylvania Army National Guard: On a wreath of the colors Argent and Gules, a lion rampant guardant Proper, holding in dexter paw a naked scimitar Argent hilted Or and in sinister an escutcheon Argent on a fess Sable three plates. Motto:

The shield is red for Artillery. Service during the War of 1812 is indicated by the maple leaf; the Mexican War by the scorpion; the Civil War by the dome of the United States Capitol; Spanish–American War by the Maltese cross; and World War I by the seven fleurs-de-lis. The crest is that of the Pennsylvania Army National Guard.

=== Background ===
The coat of arms was originally approved for the 213th Coast Artillery Regiment on 1 April 1932. It was redesignated for the 213th Antiaircraft Artillery Gun Battalion on 26 March 1952. It was redesignated for the 213th Antiaircraft Artillery Battalion on 15 December 1954. The insignia was redesignated for the 213th Artillery Regiment on 26 July 1961. It was redesignated for the 213th Air Defense Artillery Regiment on 8 May 1989.
