= Reinerton-Orwin-Muir, Pennsylvania =

- Former CDP
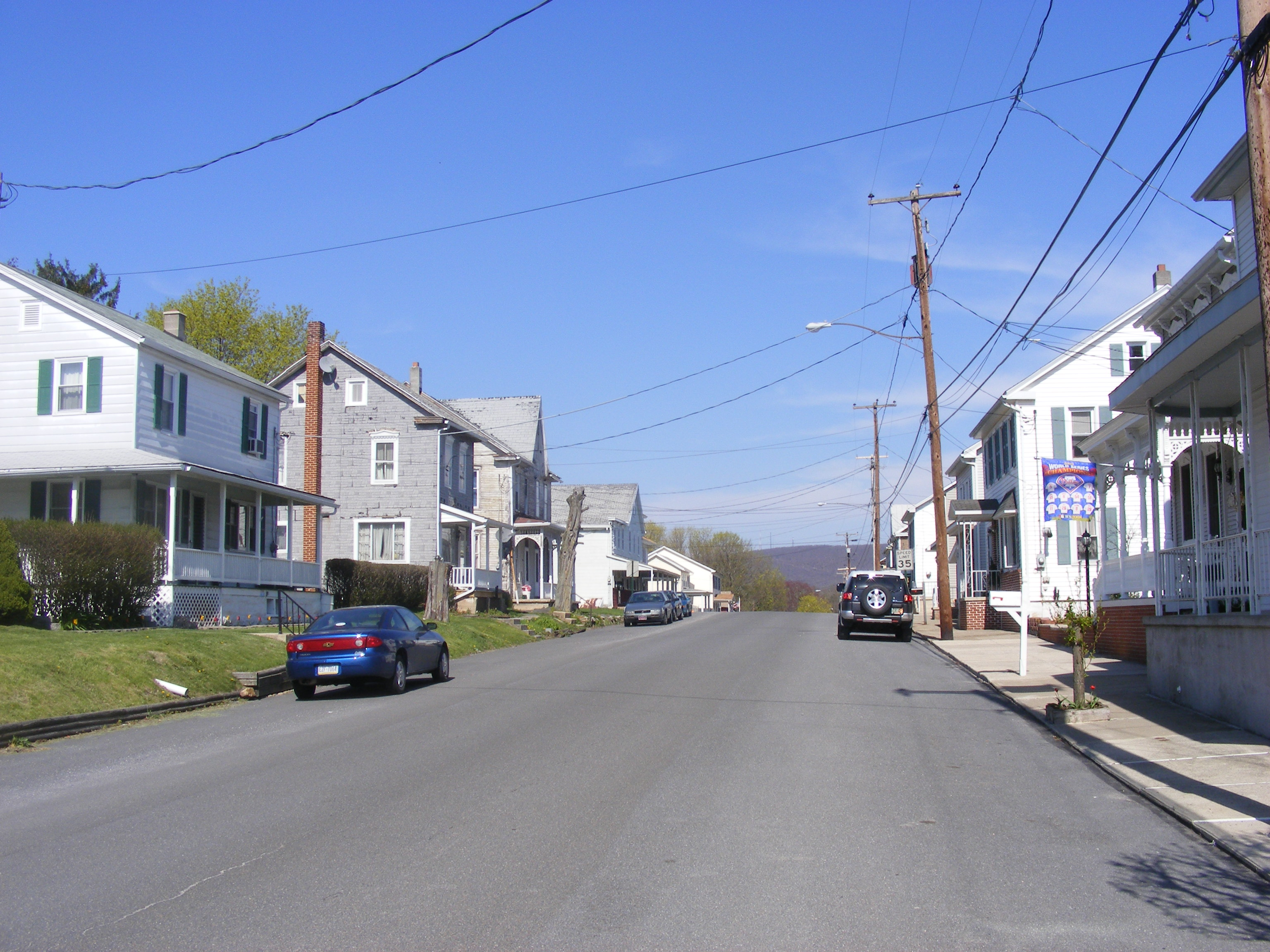
- Streetside in Muir

- Location within the U.S. state of Pennsylvania Reinerton-Orwin-Muir, Pennsylvania (the United States)
- Coordinates: 40°35′28″N 76°32′0″W
- Country: United States
- State: Pennsylvania
- County: Schuylkill

Area
  - Total: 1.4 sq mi (3.6 km^{2})
  - Land: 1.4 sq mi (3.6 km^{2})

Population (2000)
  - Total: 1,037
  - Density: 750/sq mi (290/km^{2})
- Time zone: UTC-5 (Eastern (EST))
  - Summer (DST): UTC-4 (EDT)

Reinerton-Orwin-Muir was a census-designated place (CDP) that was located in Schuylkill County, Pennsylvania, United States. The population was 1,037 at the time of the 2000 census. For the 2010 census, the area was split into three CDPs, Reinerton, Orwin, and Muir.

== Geography ==
Reinerton-Orwin-Muir was located at 40°35′28″N 76°32′0″W (40.591023, -76.533335).

According to the United States Census Bureau, the CDP had a total area of 1.4 square miles (3.6 km^{2}), all of it land.

== Notable residents ==
- Les Brown - band leader

== Demographics ==
As of the census of 2000, there were 1,037 people, 430 households, and 322 families residing in the CDP. The population density was 740.2 inhabitants per square mile (285.8/km^{2}). There were 464 housing units at an average density of 331.2 per square mile (127.9/km^{2}). The racial makeup of the CDP was 99.32% White, 0.29% Asian, and 0.39% from two or more races. Hispanic or Latino of any race were 0.10% of the population.

There were 430 households, out of which 26.7% had children under the age of 18 living with them, 61.6% were married couples living together, 8.6% had a female householder with no husband present, and 24.9% were non-families. 22.1% of all households were made up of individuals, and 14.7% had someone living alone who was 65 years of age or older. The average household size was 2.41 and the average family size was 2.79.

In the CDP, the population was spread out, with 20.6% under the age of 18, 7.7% from 18 to 24, 27.2% from 25 to 44, 26.0% from 45 to 64, and 18.4% who were 65 years of age or older. The median age was 41 years. For every 100 females, there were 100.6 males. For every 100 females age 18 and over, there were 98.3 males.

The median income for a household in the CDP was $39,821, and the median income for a family was $46,364. Males had a median income of $31,765 versus $23,068 for females. The per capita income for the CDP was $18,663. About 4.7% of families and 5.4% of the population were below the poverty line, including 5.3% of those under age 18 and 8.6% of those age 65 or over.

== Gallery ==
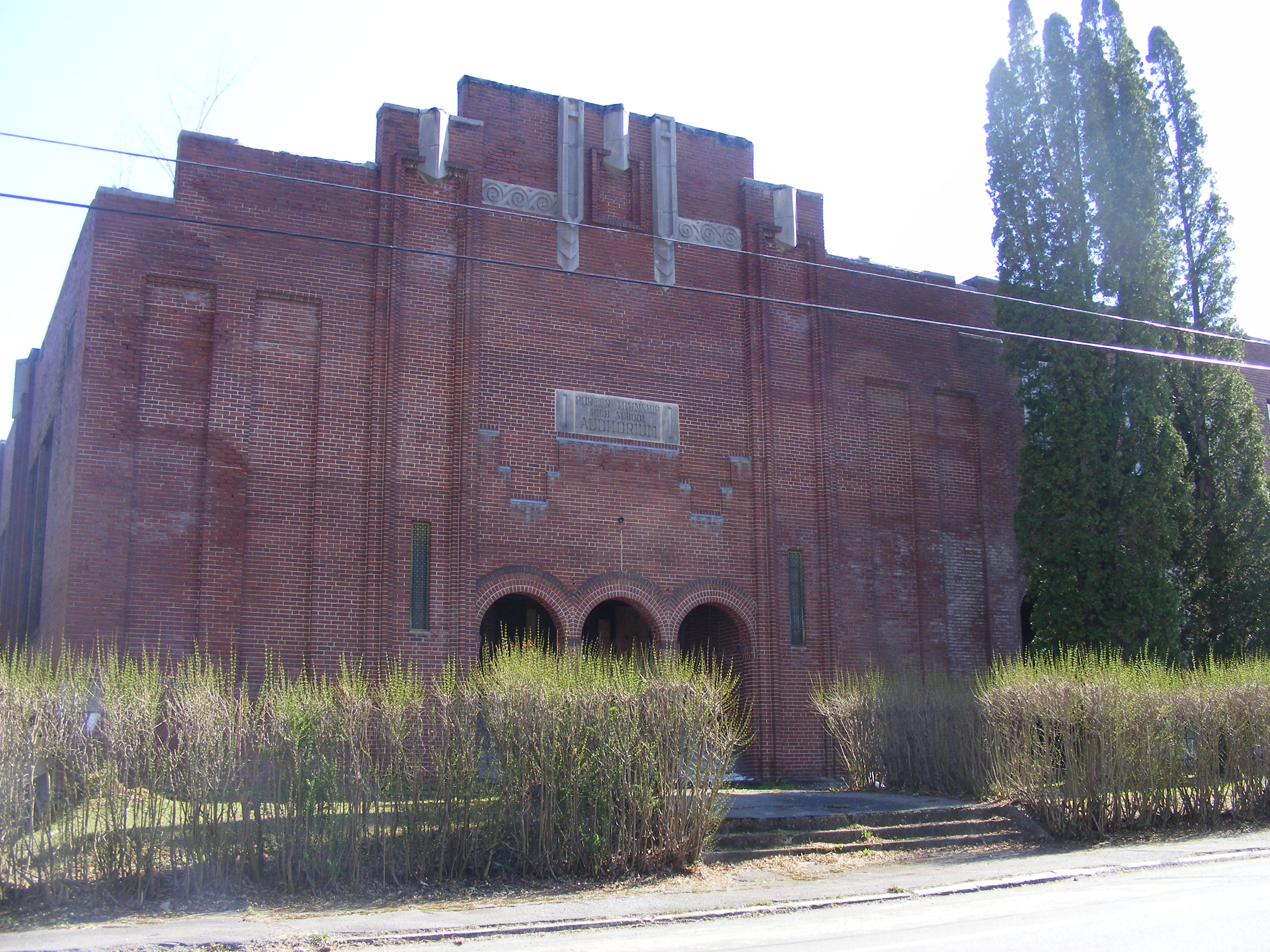
The remains of the Porter Township High School, Reinerton

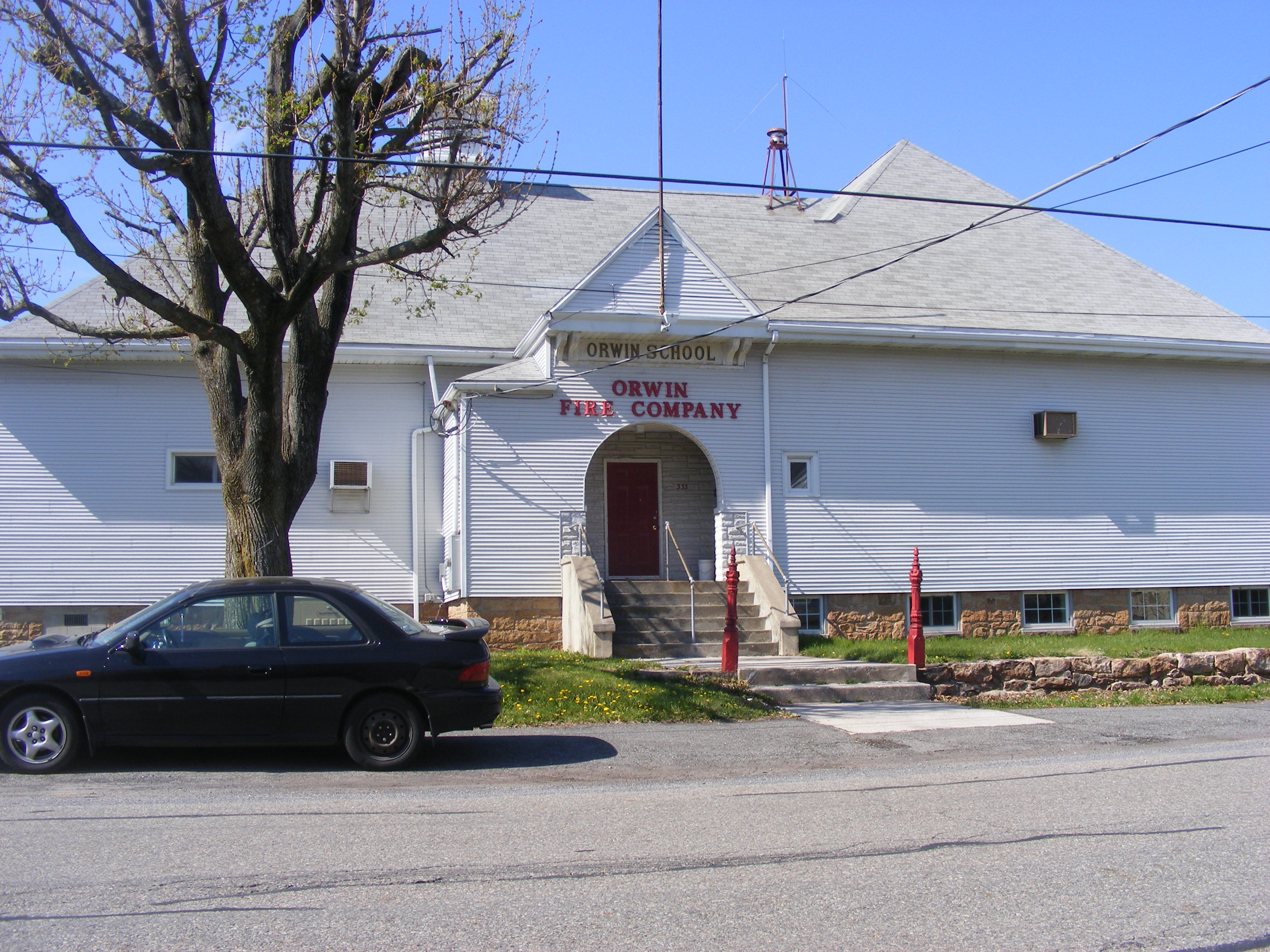
The Orwin Fire House, on the site of the old Orwin School
