= John Sylvanus Thompson =

American pianist, composer and educator

John Sylvanus Thompson (8 March 1889 – 1963) was an American pianist, composer, and educator. He was born in Williamstown, Pennsylvania, to James C. Thompson, a merchant in a general store, and his Welsh wife, Emma J. Thompson (née Hall). John had three younger siblings: Alma, born 1895, James Jr., born in 1900, and Frank, born in 1905. Thompson had a promising career as a pianist, performing in many cities in America. In July, 1909, Thompson applied for a passport in preparation for touring Europe as a concert pianist. Once there, however, due to health issues and unrest leading up to World War I, he returned to the United States in April 1914. Thompson moved to Philadelphia to teach piano and met a writer, Loretta Katherine Foy, three years his junior, who was residing with her widowed mother. Thompson and Foy married on 14 August 1916 near his home town. They relocated to Kansas City, Missouri, where Thompson worked as a piano teacher in a music school. There, their son, John Jr., was born in 1918, followed by a second son, Charles Leslie, in 1924. He maintained a long and distinguished career in piano pedagogy. Thompson headed music conservatories in Philadelphia, Indianapolis, and Kansas City.

His piano methods, Modern Course for the Piano, Teaching Little Fingers to Play (the first part of the Modern Course), Adult Piano Course and Easiest Piano Course are published by the Willis Music Company.

Thompson died in Tucson, Arizona, after a long illness in 1963.
