= The Morning Call =

American daily newspaper in Allentown, Pennsylvania

- The front page of The Morning Call's July 27, 2005 edition
- Type: Daily newspaper
- Format: Broadsheet
- Owner: Alden Global Capital
- Founded: 1883; 143 years ago (as The Critic)
- Headquarters: Allentown, Pennsylvania, U.S.
- ISSN: 2641-3825
- OCLC number: 137343977
- Website: mcall.com

The Morning Call is a daily newspaper in Allentown, Pennsylvania. Founded in 1883, it is the second-longest continuously published newspaper in the Lehigh Valley, after The Express-Times. The newspaper is owned by Alden Global Capital, a New York City–based hedge fund.

In 2020, the newspaper permanently closed its Allentown headquarters after allegedly failing to pay four months of rent and citing diminishing advertising revenues.

== History ==
=== 19th century ===
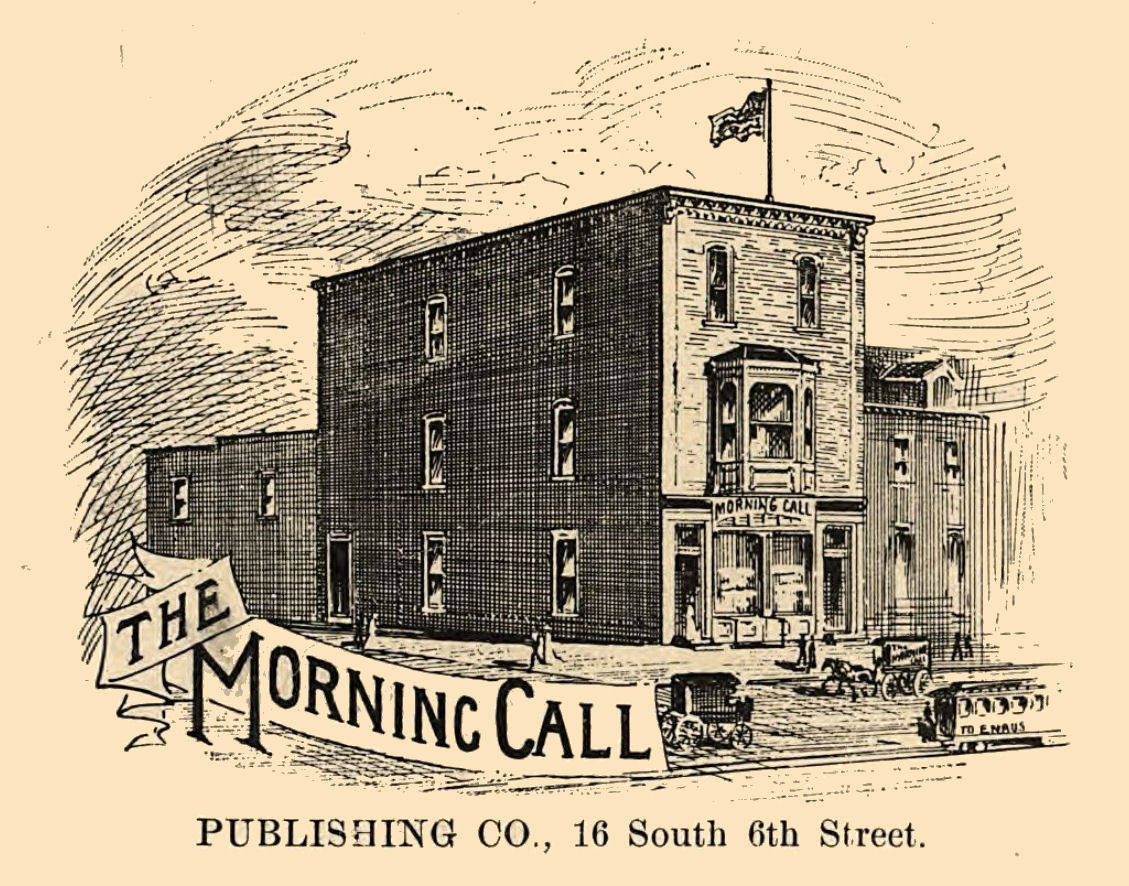
A 1900 advertisement for The Morning Call after its rebranding, showcasing the newspaper's former headquarters at 16 South 6th Street

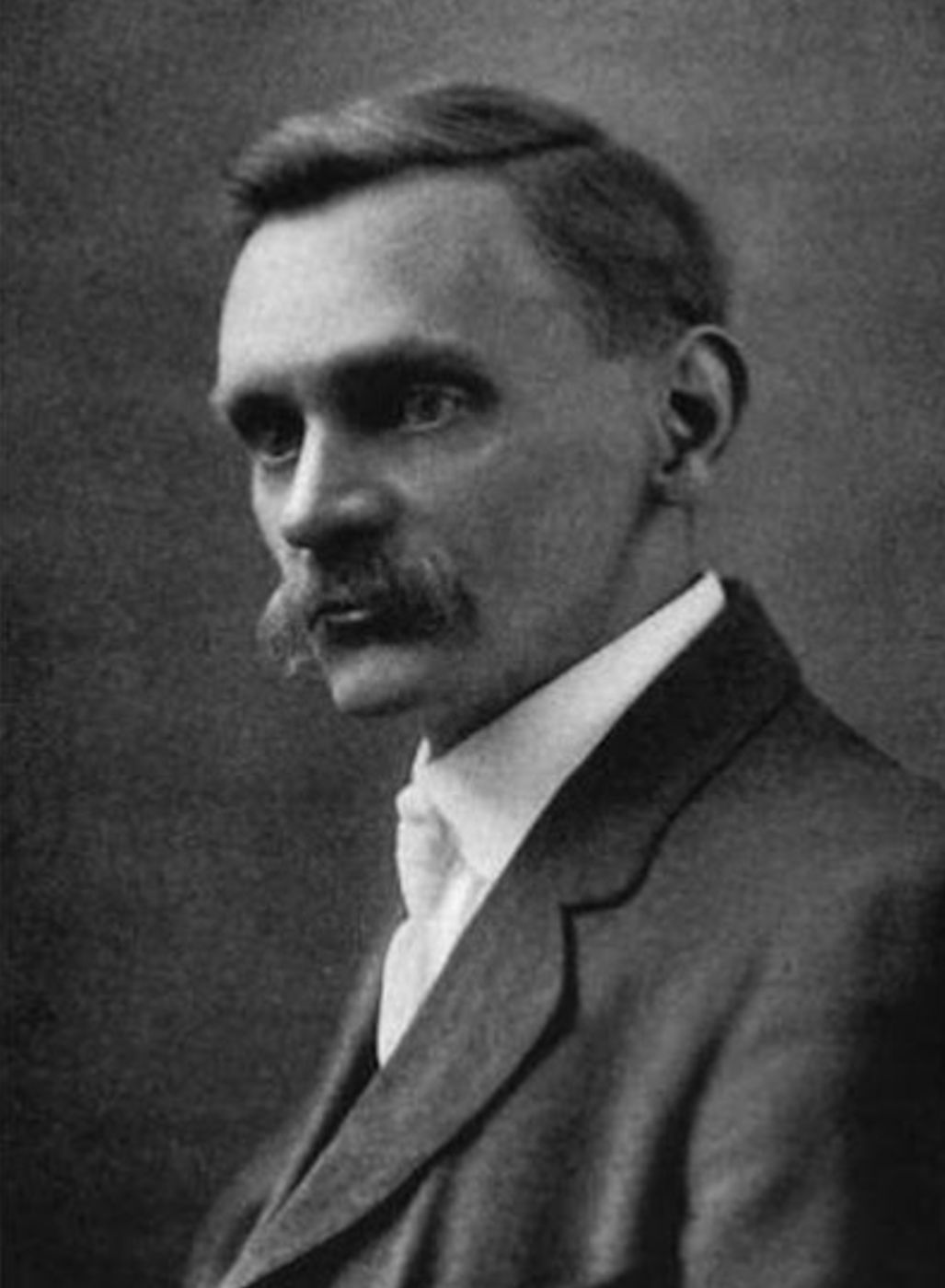
David A. Miller, a Muhlenberg College senior, was the newspaper's first reporter; in 1904, he and his brother Samuel acquired the newspaper, owning it until 1920, and later serving as its president from 1934 until his death in 1958.

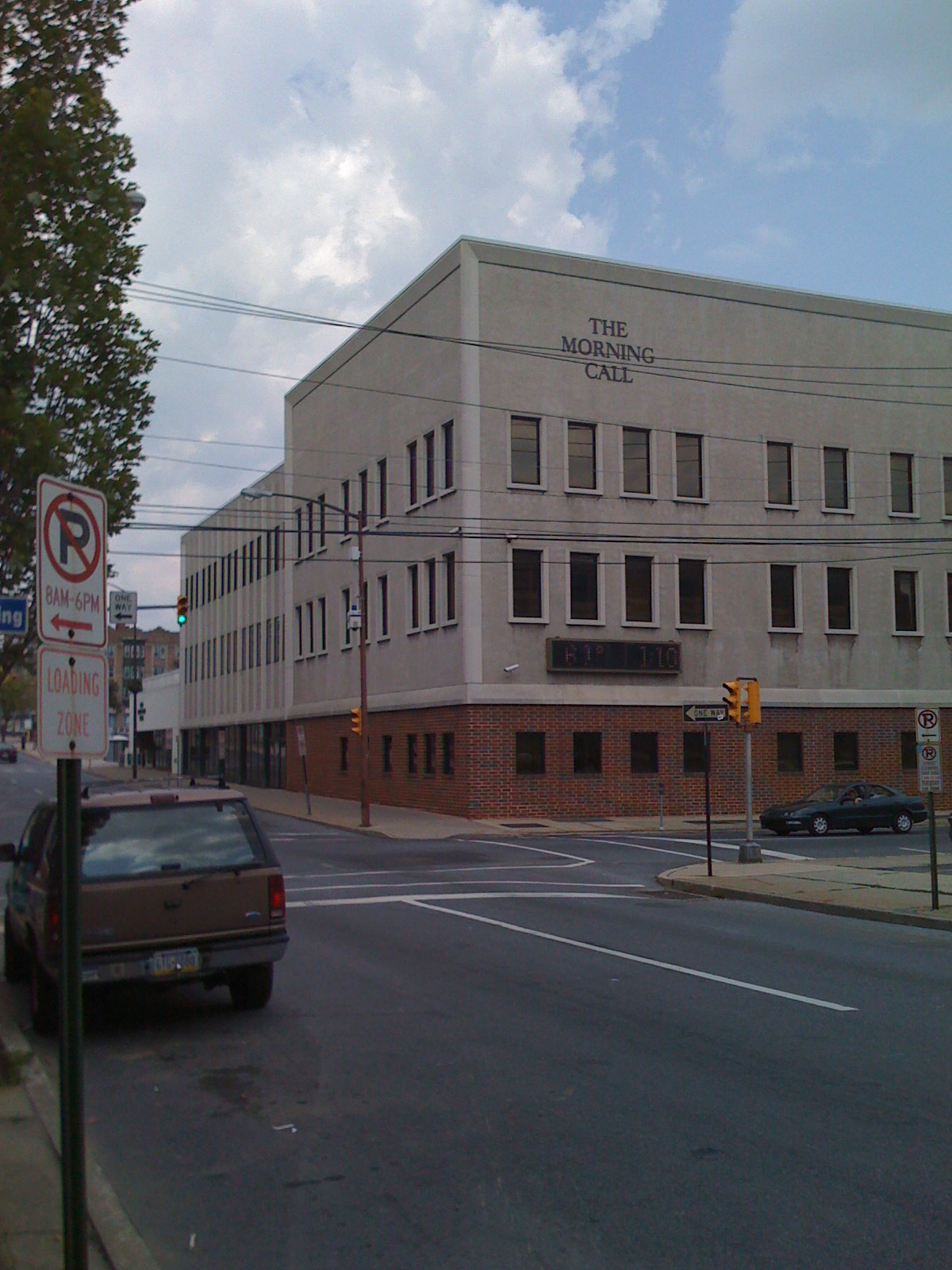
In 1920, The Morning Call moved into its headquarters at 101 N. 6th Street in Center City Allentown; in 2020, after allegedly failing to pay four consecutive months of rent, the newspaper announced that it was abandoning the building.

The Morning Call was founded in 1883. Its original name was The Critic. Its original editor, owner and chief reporter was Samuel S. Woolever. The newspaper's first reporter was a Muhlenberg College senior, David A. Miller. The newspaper was subsequently acquired by Charles Weiser, its editor, and Kirt W. DeBelle, its business manager.

In 1894, the newspaper launched a reader contest, offering $5 in gold to a school boy or girl in Lehigh County who could guess the publication's new name. The identity of the lucky winner is lost to history. But on January 1, 1895, Allentown City Treasurer A.L. Reichenbach, who supervised the contest, announced that the newspaper would be renamed The Morning Call. The same year, David A. Miller and his brother Samuel Miller began purchasing private shares in The Morning Call, ultimately acquiring the newspaper completely in 1904.

=== 20th century ===
By 1920, the newspaper's circulation was 20,000. That year, Harry Clay Trexler acquired the newspaper from the Miller brothers. In 1922, Charles Clarence Curtis joined the paper's advertising department; he soon became the department's manager, and remained in the post until his death in 1960, in addition to pursuing a military career ion which he attained the rank of major general. A year following Trexler's death in 1933, David A. Miller returned to the newspaper. In 1935, The Morning Call acquired a competing Allentown newspaper, The Chronicle and News, renaming it The Evening Chronicle. In 1938, The Sunday Call-Chronicle was first published.

In 1951, David A. Miller assumed the official title of president of the Call-Chronicle newspapers, maintaining that role until his death in 1958 at age 88. In September 1951, Miller's two sons, Donald and Samuel, were appointed the newspaper's publishers. After Samuel Miller's death in 1967, Donald P. Miller continued to run the newspaper along with his son Edward D. Miller, who was appointed executive editor and publisher in the late 1970s.

In 1980, The Evening Chronicle ceased publication. The following year, in 1981, Edward D. Miller left the newspaper, and Donald P. Miller returned as its chairman. Bernard C. Stinner was appointed the newspaper's publisher and chief executive officer. In 1984, the newspaper was sold to the Times Mirror Company. Gary K. Shorts was appointed the newspaper's publisher and chief executive officer in 1987. He was succeeded by Guy Gilmore in 2000. Susan Hunt was named publisher in June 2001.

On December 30, 1996, an online service of the Morning Call began being published, titled mcall.com.

=== 21st century ===
In 2000, Times Mirror Company's media assets, including The Morning Call, were acquired by Tribune Media.

In May 2021, The Morning Call was again acquired, this time by Alden Global Capital, a New York City–based hedge fund, which already had acquired nearly a third of Tribune Media. The acquisition was opposed and then criticized by the guild representing journalists at the newspaper.

In the first half of 2024 The Morning Call moved all online content behind a paywall.

== Controversies ==
=== Rape and sexual assault allegations against columnist ===
In 2020, Paul Carpenter, a Morning Call bureau chief and Morning Call columnist for 25 years from 1984 until 2019, was sued by his daughter, who charged Carpenter with "repeatedly raping and sexually assaulting" her for a decade from age nine until age 19.

=== Rent arrears and headquarters closure ===
In 2020, the landlord for The Morning Call's offices at 101 N. Sixth Street in Center City Allentown sued The Morning Call, alleging it had failed to pay rent for the headquarters for four consecutive months in April, May, June, and again in July 2020.

On August 12, 2020, the newspaper's interim general manager Timothy Thomas sent an email to employees, announcing that The Morning Call was permanently closing its headquarters, which the newspaper had maintained for a century since 1920, as it searched "for ways to save money as advertising revenue dwindled." The newspaper's roughly 100 employees were asked in the email to "retrieve personal items from the office by September 15," the newspaper reported.

== See also ==
- Media in the Lehigh Valley
