= Reinerton, Pennsylvania =

Unincorporated community in Pennsylvania, US

Coordinates: 40°35′32″N 76°31′56″W

- Census-designated place
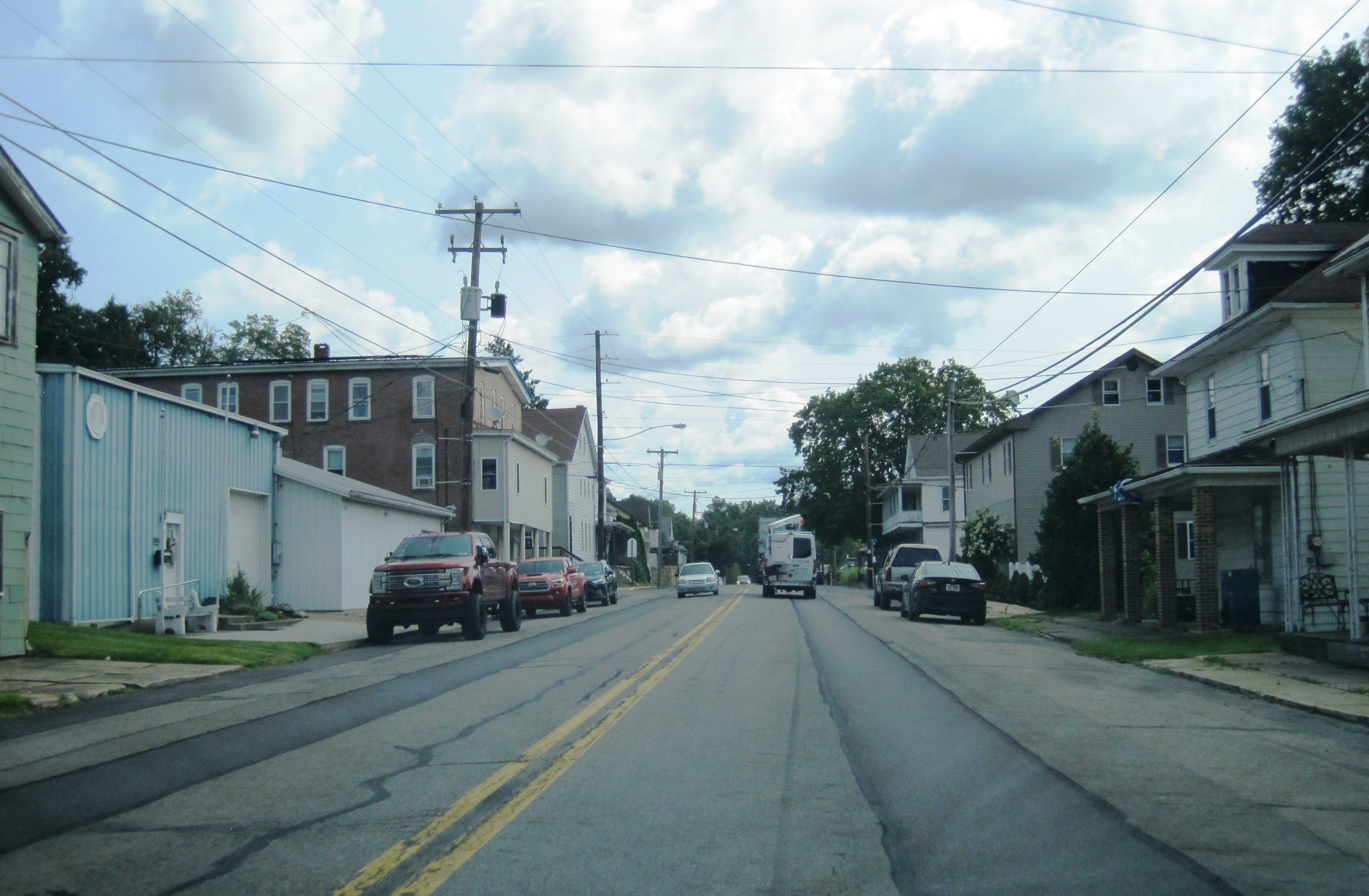
- Photo along US 209 (Grand Avenue)
- Interactive map of Reinerton, Pennsylvania
- Country: United States
- State: Pennsylvania
- County: Schuylkill

Area
  - Total: 0.46 sq mi (1.20 km^{2})
  - Land: 0.46 sq mi (1.20 km^{2})
  - Water: 0 sq mi (0.00 km^{2})

Population (2020)
  - Total: 456
  - Density: 981.9/sq mi (379.11/km^{2})
- Time zone: UTC-5 (Eastern (EST))
  - Summer (DST): UTC-4 (EDT)
- FIPS code: 42-64104

Reinerton is a census-designated place located in Porter Township, Schuylkill County in the state of Pennsylvania, United States. Reinerton was part of the Reinerton-Orwin-Muir CDP at the 2000 census before splitting into three individual CDPs for the 2010 census. The other communities, along with Reinerton are Orwin and Muir. The community is located near the community of Muir along U.S. Route 209. As of the 2020 census, the population was 456 residents.

== Demographics ==
Historical population
Census	Pop.	Note	%±
2020	456		—
U.S. Decennial Census

== Education ==
The school district is Williams Valley School District.
