= Porter Township, Schuylkill County, Pennsylvania =

Township in Pennsylvania, US

Coordinates: 40°36′00″N 76°31′59″W

- Township
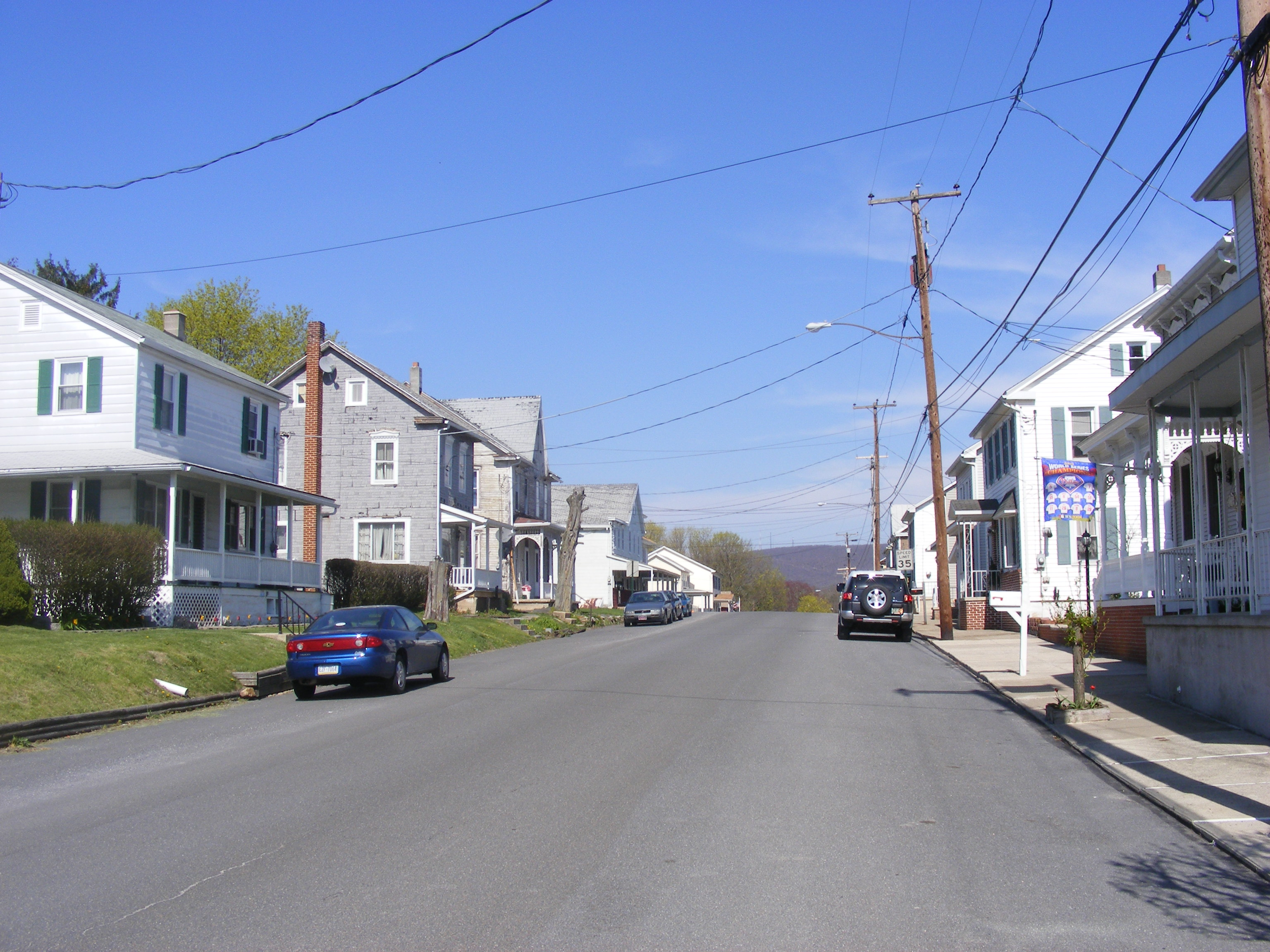
- Wiconisco Street in Muir

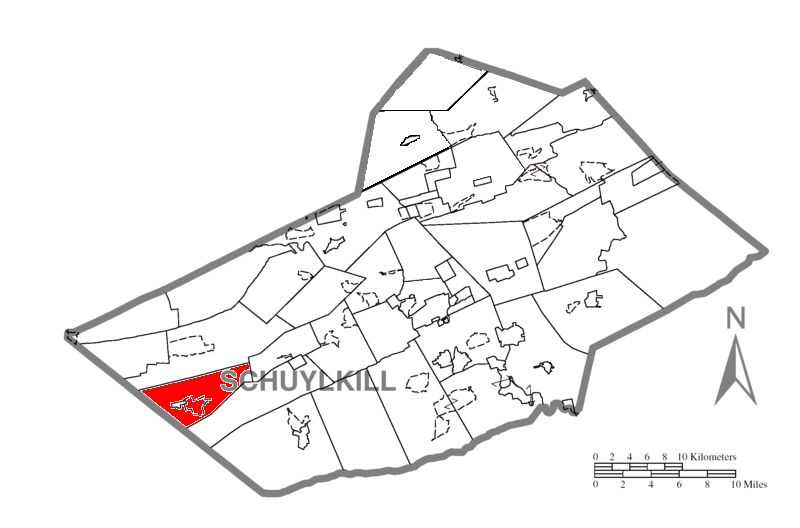
- Map of Schuylkill County, Pennsylvania Highlighting Porter Township

- Map of Schuylkill County, Pennsylvania
- Country: United States
- State: Pennsylvania
- County: Schuylkill
- Settled: 1774
- Incorporated: 1840

Area
  - Total: 17.99 sq mi (46.60 km^{2})
  - Land: 17.98 sq mi (46.58 km^{2})
  - Water: 0.0077 sq mi (0.02 km^{2})

Population (2020)
  - Total: 2,157 ▼
  - Estimate (2021): 2,157
  - Density: 116.7/sq mi (45.06/km^{2})
- Time zone: UTC-5 (Eastern (EST))
  - Summer (DST): UTC-4 (EDT)
- FIPS code: 42-107-62200

Porter Township is a township that is located in Schuylkill County, Pennsylvania, United States. The population was 2,157 at the time of the 2020 census.

== Geography ==
According to the United States Census Bureau, the township has a total area of 18.1 square miles (46.9 km^{2}), of which 18.1 square miles (46.9 km^{2}) is land and 0.06% is water. It contains the census-designated places of Muir, Orwin, and Reinerton.

== Demographics ==
Historical population
Census	Pop.	Note	%±
2010	2,176		—
2020	2,157		−0.9%
2021 (est.)	2,157		0.0%
U.S. Decennial Census

At the time of the 2000 census, there were 2,032 people, 851 households, and 622 families living in the township.

The population density was 112.3 inhabitants per square mile (43.4/km^{2}). There were 921 housing units at an average density of 50.9 per square mile (19.7/km^{2}).

The racial makeup of the township was 99.61% White, 0.15% Asian, and 0.25% from two or more races. Hispanic or Latino of any race were 0.44%.

Of the 851 households that were documented by the census, 26.3% had children who were under the age of eighteen living with them, 58.5% were married couples living together, 9.3% had a female householder with no husband present, and 26.8% were non-families. 23.6% of households were one-person households and 14.6% were one-person households with residents who were aged sixty-five or older.

The average household size was 2.39 and the average family size was 2.78.

The age distribution was 21.2% of residents who were under the age of eighteen, 7.3% who were aged eighteen to twenty-four, 28.5% who were aged twenty-five to forty-four, 25.5% who were aged forty-five to sixty-four, and 17.5% who were aged sixty-five or older. The median age was forty years.

For every one hundred females, there were 99.6 males. For every one hundred females who were aged eighteen or older, there were 98.1 males.

The median household income was $36,957 and the median family income was $43,684. Males had a median income of $31,418 compared with that of $21,705 for females.

The per capita income for the township was $18,373.

Approximately 4.2% of families and 5.9% of the population were living below the poverty line, including 4.5% of those who were under the age of eighteen and 9.6% of those who were aged sixty-five or older.
