= Wiconisco Township, Pennsylvania =

Township in Pennsylvania, US

Coordinates: 40°34′00″N 76°41′59″W

- Township
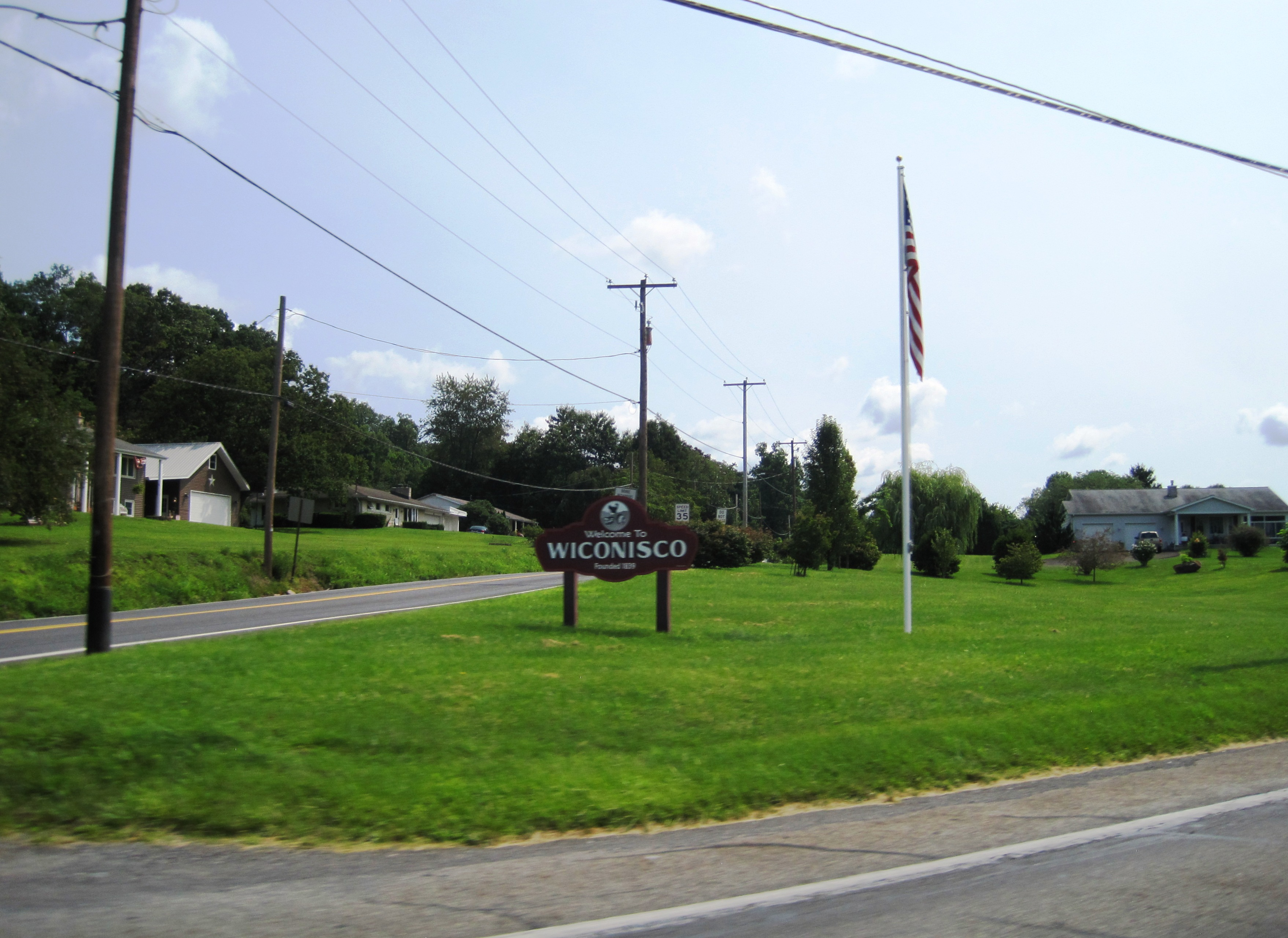
- Entering Wiconisco Township along northbound US 209

- Location in Dauphin County and state of Pennsylvania.
- Country: United States
- State: Pennsylvania
- County: Dauphin
- Incorporated: 1839

Area
  - Total: 9.76 sq mi (25.28 km^{2})
  - Land: 9.76 sq mi (25.28 km^{2})
  - Water: 0 sq mi (0.00 km^{2})

Population (2020)
  - Total: 1,167 ▼
  - Estimate (2023): 1,156
  - Density: 121.6/sq mi (46.95/km^{2})
- Time zone: UTC-5 (Eastern (EST))
  - Summer (DST): UTC-4 (EDT)
- Area code: 717
- FIPS code: 42-043-84976
- Website: wiconiscotownship.com

Wiconisco Township is a township in Dauphin County, Pennsylvania, United States. The population was 1,167 in the 2020 census. Wiconisco Township took its name from Wiconisco Creek, a west-flowing tributary of the Susquehanna River.

== Geography ==
Wiconisco Township is in the northern part of Dauphin County. The borough of Lykens, a separate municipality, is in the southern part of the township. The unincorporated community of Wiconisco is in the eastern part of the township.

According to the United States Census Bureau, the township has a total area of 9.8 square miles (25.3 km^{2}), all land.

== Demographics ==
Historical population
Census	Pop.	Note	%±
2010	1,210		—
2020	1,167		−3.6%
2023 (est.)	1,156		−0.9%
U.S. Decennial Census

At the 2000 census there were 1,168 people, 476 households, and 330 families in the township. The population density was 115.9 inhabitants per square mile (44.7/km^{2}). There were 530 housing units at an average density of 52.6 per square mile (20.3/km^{2}). The racial makeup of the township was 98.72% White, 0.17% African American, 0.26% Native American, 0.43% Asian, and 0.43% from two or more races. Hispanic or Latino of any race were 0.09%.

There were 476 households, 26.5% had children under the age of 18 living with them, 54.6% were married couples living together, 10.1% had a female householder with no husband present, and 30.5% were non-families. 24.6% of households were made up of individuals, and 13.0% were one person aged 65 or older. The average household size was 2.45 and the average family size was 2.92.

The age distribution was 22.3% under the age of 18, 7.7% from 18 to 24, 26.5% from 25 to 44, 27.3% from 45 to 64, and 16.1% 65 or older. The median age was 41 years. For every 100 females, there were 97.3 males. For every 100 females age 18 and over, there were 92.2 males.

The median household income was $33,654 and the median family income was $38,182. Males had a median income of $31,333 versus $21,394 for females. The per capita income for the township was $15,268. About 7.1% of families and 9.5% of the population were below the poverty line, including 12.2% of those under age 18 and 9.2% of those age 65 or over.
