= Williams Township, Dauphin County, Pennsylvania =

Township in Pennsylvania, US

Coordinates: 40°36′00″N 76°37′59″W

- Township
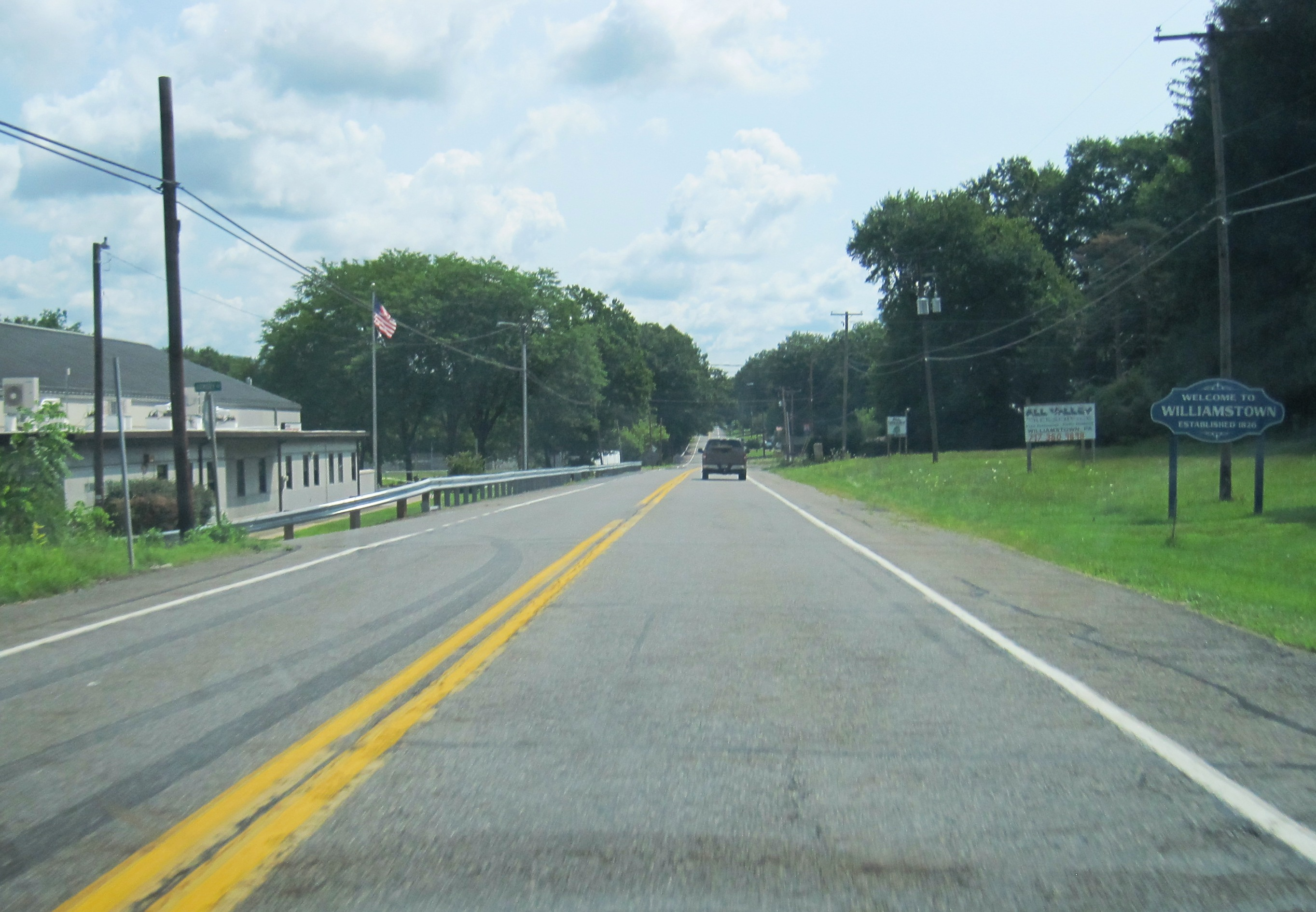
- Williams Township along northbound US 209

- Location in Dauphin County and state of Pennsylvania.
- Country: United States
- State: Pennsylvania
- County: Dauphin
- Incorporated: 1869

Area
  - Total: 8.83 sq mi (22.87 km^{2})
  - Land: 8.83 sq mi (22.87 km^{2})
  - Water: 0 sq mi (0.00 km^{2})

Population (2020)
  - Total: 1,064 ▼
  - Estimate (2023): 1,056
  - Density: 125.5/sq mi (48.44/km^{2})
- Time zone: UTC-5 (Eastern (EST))
  - Summer (DST): UTC-4 (EDT)
- Area code: 717
- FIPS code: 42-043-85232
- Website: www.wmstwp.org

Williams Township is a township that is located in Dauphin County, Pennsylvania, United States. The population was 1,064 at the time of the 2020 census.

== History ==
Williams Township was named for a family of pioneer settlers.

== Geography ==
The township is located in northeastern Dauphin County and is bordered to the northeast by Schuylkill County.

The borough of Williamstown, a separate municipality, is located in the southern part of the township. The villages of Dayton and Greenfield are located east and west of Williamstown, respectively.

According to the United States Census Bureau, the township has a total area of 8.8 square miles (22.9 km^{2}), all land.

== Demographics ==
Historical population
Census	Pop.	Note	%±
2010	1,112		—
2020	1,064		−4.3%
2023 (est.)	1,056		−0.8%
U.S. Decennial Census

As of the census of 2000, there were 1,135 people, 454 households, and 337 families residing in the township.

The population density was 129.3 inhabitants per square mile (49.9/km^{2}). There were 504 housing units at an average density of 57.4 per square mile (22.2/km^{2}).

The racial makeup of the township was 98.41% White, 0.18% African American, 0.26% Native American, 0.26% from other races, and 0.88% from two or more races. Hispanic or Latino of any race were 0.88% of the population.

There were 454 households, out of which 30.4% had children under the age of 18 living with them, 59.5% were married couples living together, 9.7% had a female householder with no husband present, and 25.6% were non-families. 23.3% of all households were made up of individuals, and 11.9% had someone living alone who was 65 years of age or older.

The average household size was 2.50 and the average family size was 2.91.

Within the township, the population was spread out, with 23.3% under the age of 18, 7.2% from 18 to 24, 29.2% from 25 to 44, 25.9% from 45 to 64, and 14.4% who were 65 years of age or older. The median age was 39 years.

For every 100 females, there were 106.0 males. For every 100 females age 18 and over, there were 98.4 males.

The median income for a household in the township was $41,029, and the median income for a family was $46,250. Males had a median income of $32,331 compared with that of $25,625 for females.

The per capita income for the township was $17,656.

Approximately 7.6% of families and 8.9% of the population were living below the poverty line, including 8.7% of those under age 18 and 17.7% of those age 65 or over.
