= Williamstown, Pennsylvania =

Borough in Pennsylvania, US

- Borough
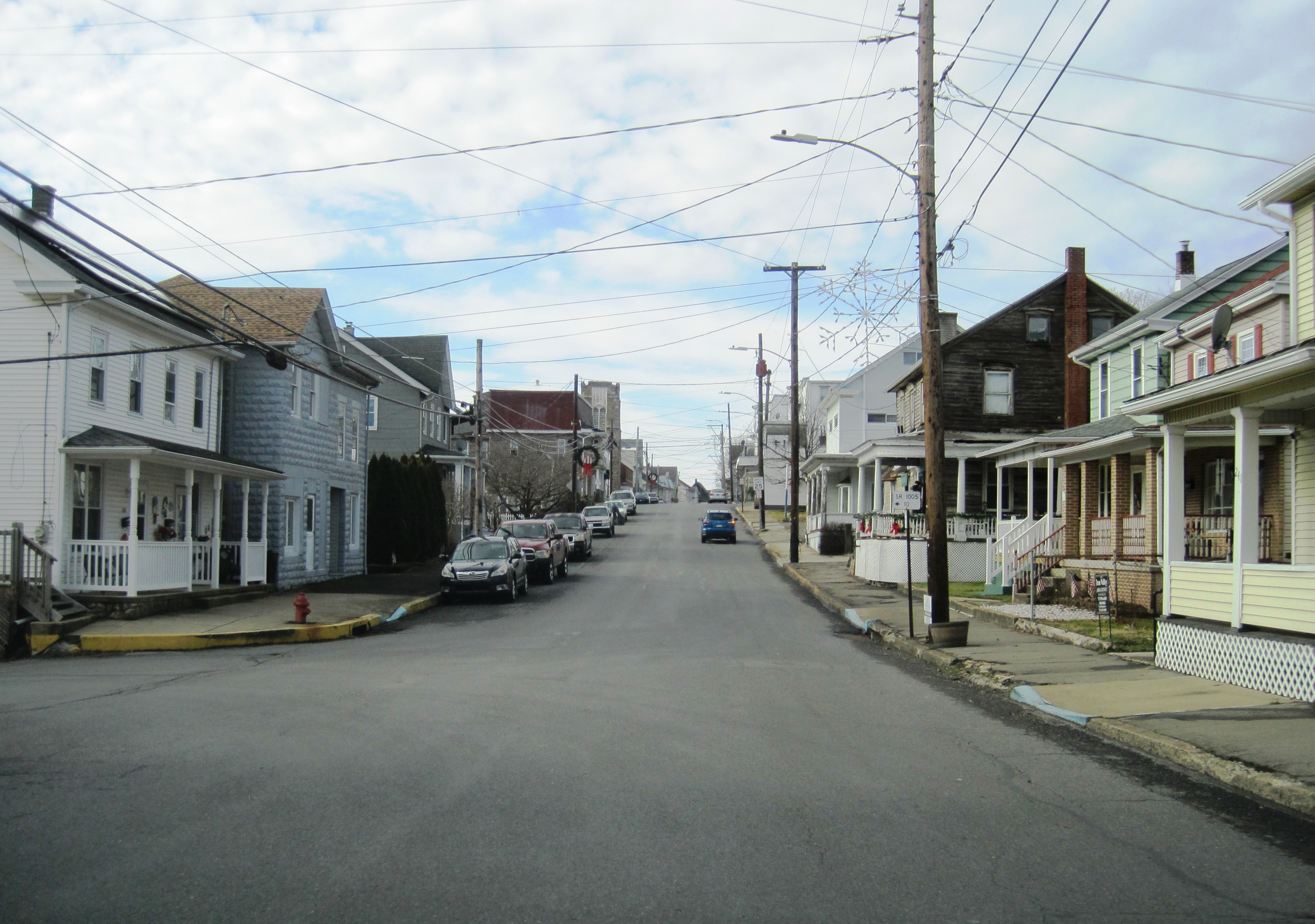
- East Market Street in Williamstown

- Location in Dauphin County and the U.S. state of Pennsylvania.

- Location in Pennsylvania and the United States Williamstown (the United States)
- Coordinates: 40°34′52″N 76°37′06″W
- Country: United States
- State: Pennsylvania
- County: Dauphin
- Settled: 1869
- Incorporated: 1877

Government
  - Type: Borough Council

Area
  - Total: 0.26 sq mi (0.67 km^{2})
  - Land: 0.26 sq mi (0.67 km^{2})
  - Water: 0 sq mi (0.00 km^{2})
- Elevation: 866 ft (264 m)

Population (2020)
  - Total: 1,303
  - Density: 5,026.9/sq mi (1,940.88/km^{2})
- Time zone: UTC-5 (Eastern (EST))
  - Summer (DST): UTC-4 (EDT)
- ZIP Code: 17098
- Area code: 717
- FIPS code: 42-85320

Williamstown is a borough in Dauphin County, Pennsylvania, United States. The borough is 38 miles (61 km) northeast of Harrisburg. Formerly, anthracite coal mines and hosiery mills were located in the borough. The town takes its name from a Revolutionary War-era traveler who passed through the region and operated a sawmill nearby. Tunneling through Big Lick Mountain at the future colliery site began in 1856–57 under the Summit Branch Railroad Company, and the transportation of anthracite coal from the mine complex began in 1866 — the year the Williamstown Colliery shipped 67,643 tons in its first year of operation. The mine became a subsidiary of the Pennsylvania Railroad in the 1870s and in its earliest years ranked as one of the largest anthracite producers in the world, shipping nearly 300,000 tons in 1869 alone. By the 1920s, coal was being extracted from depths of up to 1,600 feet. The colliery was officially shuttered on January 30, 1942, as falling anthracite prices and the shift from steam to oil power made operations unviable. The closure had a devastating effect on the community, as the great majority of the borough's workforce had been employed at the colliery, with additional employment provided by two hosiery mills. The population was 1,303 at the 2020 census.

Williamstown is part of the Harrisburg–Carlisle Metropolitan Statistical Area.

== Geography ==
Williamstown is located in northeastern Dauphin County at 40°34′52″N 76°37′6″W (40.581075, -76.618296). It is in the valley of Wiconisco Creek, between Big Lick Mountain to the north and Berry Mountain to the south. U.S. Route 209 passes to the south of the borough, leading northeast 24 miles (39 km) to Pottsville and west 11 miles (18 km) to Elizabethville.

According to the United States Census Bureau, the borough has a total area of 0.26 square miles (0.67 km^{2}), all land.

== Demographics ==
Historical population
Census	Pop.	Note	%±
1880	1,771		—
1890	2,324		31.2%
1900	2,934		26.2%
1910	2,904		−1.0%
1920	2,878		−0.9%
1930	2,958		2.8%
1940	2,769		−6.4%
1950	2,332		−15.8%
1960	2,097		−10.1%
1970	1,919		−8.5%
1980	1,664		−13.3%
1990	1,509		−9.3%
2000	1,433		−5.0%
2010	1,387		−3.2%
2020	1,303		−6.1%
2021 (est.)	1,301	▼	−0.2%
U.S. Decennial Census

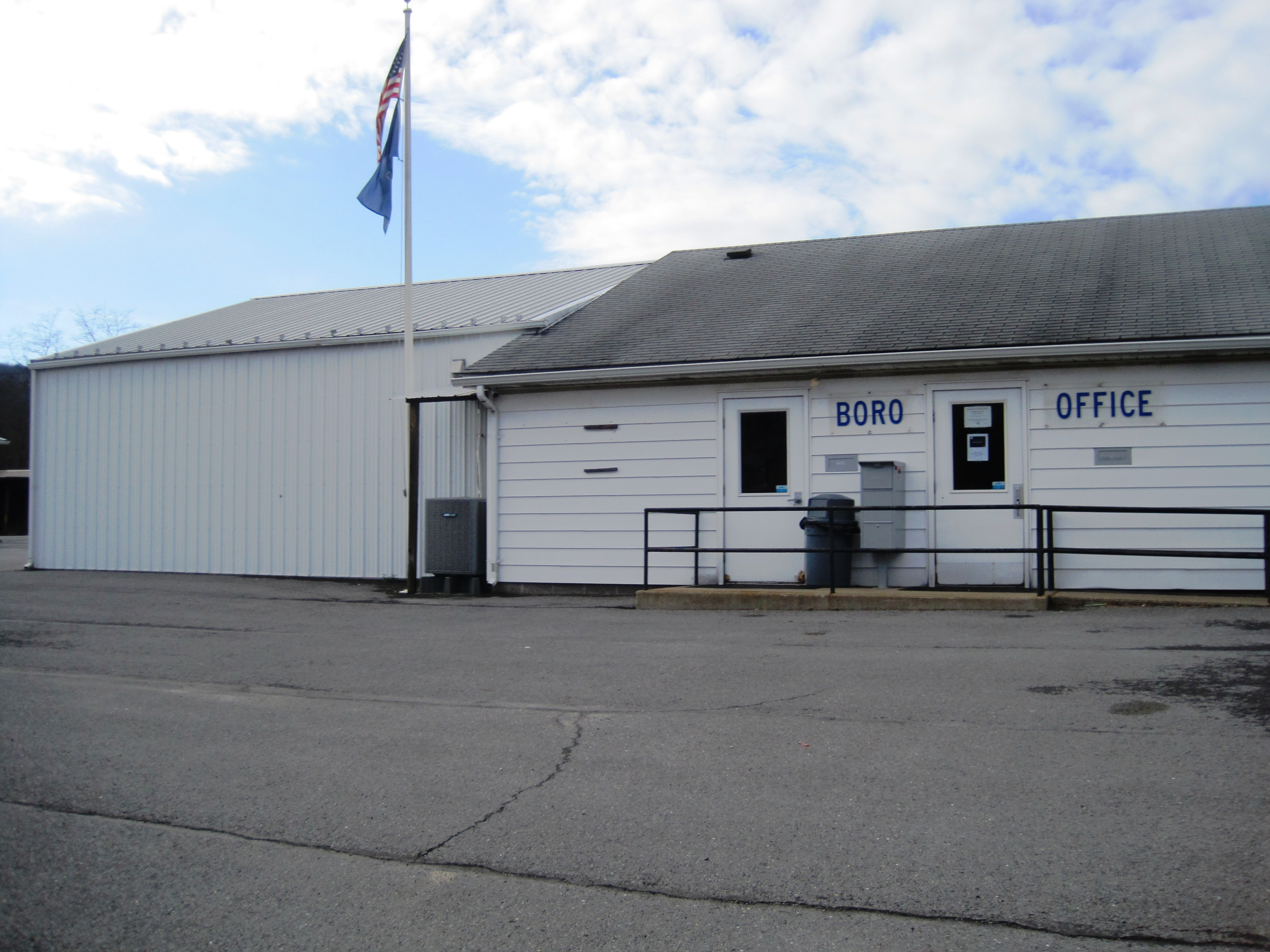
Williamstown Municipal Building

As of the census of 2000, there were 1,433 people, 611 households, and 406 families residing in the borough. The population density was 5,692.2 inhabitants per square mile (2,197.8/km^{2}). There were 716 housing units at an average density of 2,844.1 per square mile (1,098.1/km^{2}). The racial makeup of the borough was 99.02% White, 0.14% African American, 0.07% Native American, 0.21% Asian, 0.07% from other races, and 0.49% from two or more races. Hispanic or Latino of any race were 0.35% of the population.

There were 611 households, 25.7% of which included children under the age of 18. 49.3% were married couples living together, 11.6% had a female householder, and 33.4% were non-families. 29.0% of all households consisted of individuals, and 15.9% were single residents 65 years of age or older. The average household size was 2.35 and the average family size was 2.83.

The borough population included 21.8% under the age of 18; 8.0% from 18 to 24; 27.5% from 25 to 44; 22.0% from 45 to 64; and 20.7% who were 65 years of age or older. The median age was 40 years. For every 100 females there were 90.1 males. For every 100 females age 18 and over, there were 86.5 males.

The median income for a household in the borough was $33,359, and the median income for a family was $36,548. Males had a median income of $31,855 versus $23,125 for females. The per capita income for the borough was $15,744. About 11.9% of families and 14.7% of the population were below the poverty line, including 18.6% of those under age 18 and 10.8% of those age 65 or over.

== Notable people ==
- Gary Collins, Played college ball for the University of Maryland Terrapins from 1959 to 1961 and was an NFL player for the Cleveland Browns from 1962 to 1971.
- Charles Clarence Curtis, U.S. Army major general
- John Sylvanus Thompson, author of multiple method books for learning the piano was born and raised in Williamstown, Pennsylvania.
