= List of census-designated places in Pennsylvania =

The following is a list of census-designated places within the US state of Pennsylvania, as of the 2010 United States census

== A ==
- Aaronsburg - Centre County
- Aaronsburg - Washington County
- Ackermanville - Northampton County
- Adamsville - Crawford County
- Albrightsville - Carbon County
- Alfarata - Mifflin County
- Alleghenyville - Berks County
- Allenport - Huntingdon County
- Allensville - Mifflin County
- Allenwood - Union County
- Allison - Fayette County
- Allison Park - Allegheny County
- Allport - Clearfield County
- Almedia - Columbia County
- Alsace Manor - Berks County
- Altamont - Schuylkill County
- Alverda - Indiana Conunty
- Amity Gardens - Berks County
- Ancient Oaks - Lehigh County
- Annville - Lebanon County
- Arcadia University - Montgomery County
- Ardmore - Delaware & Montgomery Counties
- Aristes - Columbia County
- Arlington Heights - Monroe County
- Arnold City - Fayette County
- Arnot - Tioga County
- Aspers - Adams County
- Atkinson Mills - Mifflin County
- Atlantic - Crawford County
- Atlas - Northumberland County
- Atlasburg - Washington County
- Audubon - Montgomery County
- Avella - Washington County
- Avon - Lebanon County
- Avonia - Erie County

== B ==
- Baidland - Washington County
- Baileyville - Centre County
- Bainbridge - Lancaster County
- Bairdford - Allegheny County
- Bakerstown - Allegheny County
- Bala Cynwyd - Montgomery County
- Bald Eagle - Blair County
- Barrville - Mifflin County
- Baumstown - Berks County
- Bear Rocks - Fayette County
- Beaverdale - Cambria County
- Beaver Springs - Snyder County
- Beavertown - Blair County
- Beech Mountain Lakes - Luzerne County
- Belfast - Northampton County
- Belleville - Mifflin County
- Belmont - Cambria County
- Berwyn - Chester County
- Bethel - Berks County
- Beurys Lake - Schuylkill County
- Big Bass Lake - Lackawanna & Wayne Counties
- Bigler - Clearfield County
- Birchwood Lakes - Pike County
- Bird-in Hand - Lancaster County
- Black Lick - Indiana County
- Blanchard - Centre County
- Blandburg - Cambria County
- Blandon - Berks County
- Blue Ball - Lancaster County
- Blue Bell - Montgomery County
- Blue Knob - Blair County
- Blue Ridge Summit - Franklin County
- Boalsburg - Centre County
- Bobtown - Greene County
- Boiling Springs - Cumberland County
- Boothwyn - Delaware County
- Boston - Allegheny County
- Bowers - Berks County
- Bowmansville - Lancaster County
- Bradenville - Westmoreland County
- Branchdale - Schuylkill County
- Brandonville - Schuylkill County
- Brave - Greene County
- Breinigsville - Lehigh County
- Bressler - Dauphin County
- Brickerville - Lancaster County
- Brittany Farms-The Highlands - Bucks County
- Brodheadsville - Monroe County
- Brooks Mill - Blair County
- Broomall - Delaware County
- Brownstown - Lancaster County
- Browntown - Luzerne County
- Bryn Mawr - Delaware & Montgomery Counties
- Buckhorn - Columbia County
- Buck Run - Schuylkill County
- Buffington - Fayette County
- Bulger - Washington County
- Byrnedale - Elk County

== C ==
- Cairnbrook - Somerset County
- Caln - Chester County
- Calumet - Westmoreland County
- Campbelltown - Lebanon County
- Canadohta Lake - Crawford County
- Canan Station - Blair County
- Canoe Creek - Blair County
- Carlisle Barracks - Cumberland County
- Carnot-Moon - Allegheny County
- Carson Valley - Blair County
- Casanova - Centre County
- Cashtown - Adams County
- Castanea - Clinton County
- Cecil-Bishop - Washington County
- Cedar Crest - Mifflin County
- Cementon - Lehigh County
- Cetronia - Lehigh County
- Chadds Ford - Chester & Delaware Counties
- Chalkhill - Fayette County
- Charlottsville - Blair County
- Chase - Luzerne County
- Cheltenham Village - Montgomery County
- Cherryville - Northampton County
- Chesterbrook - Chester County
- Chestnut Hill - Northampton County
- Chevy Chase Heights - Indiana County
- Chewton - Lawrence County
- Cheyney University - Chester & Delaware Counties
- Chinchilla - Lackawanna County
- Church Hill - Mifflin County
- Churchtown - Lancaster County
- Churchville - Bucks County
- Clappertown - Blair County
- Clarence - Centre County
- Clay - Lancaster County
- Claysburg - Blair County
- Clinton - Allegheny County
- Clintondale - Clinton County
- Coburn - Centre County
- Cochranville - Chester County
- Collinsburg - Westmoreland County
- Colonial Park - Dauphin County
- Colony Park - Berks County
- Columbus - Warren County
- Colver - Cambria County
- Commodore - Indiana County
- Conashaugh Lakes - Pike County
- Conestoga - Lancaster County
- Conneaut Lakeshore - Crawford County
- Continental Courts - Centre County
- Coral - Indiana County
- Cornwells Heights - Bucks County
- Cotton Town - Blair County
- Cove Forge - Blair County
- Crabtree - Westmoreland County
- Crenshaw - Jefferson County
- Cross Creek - Washington County
- Cross Keys - Blair County
- Crown - Clarion County
- Croydon - Bucks County
- Crucible - Greene County
- Culp - Blair County
- Cumbola - Schuylkill County
- Curryville - Blair County
- Curtisville - Allegheny County

== D ==
- Dalmatia - Northumberland County
- Dauberville - Berks County
- Davidsville - Somerset County
- Deer Lake - Fayette County
- Defiance - Bedford County
- Delano - Schuylkill County
- DeSales University - Lehigh County
- Devon - Chester County
- Dewart - Northumberland County
- Dilworthtown - Chester & Delaware Counties
- Dixonville - Indiana County
- Donaldson - Schuylkill County
- Dorneyville - Lehigh County
- Douglassville - Berks County
- Drexel Hill - Delaware County
- Dry Tavern - Greene County
- Dryville - Berks County
- Dumb Hundred - Blair County
- Duncott - Schuylkill County
- Dunlo - Cambria County
- Dunnstown - Clinton County

== E ==
- Eagle - Chester County
- Eagle Creek - Centre County
- Eagle Lake - Lackawanna County
- Eagleview - Chester County
- Eagleville - Centre County
- Eagleville - Montgomery County
- Earlston - Bedford County
- East Altoona - Blair County
- East Berwick - Luzerne County
- East Earl - Lancaster County
- East Freedom - Blair County
- Eastlawn Gardens - Northampton County
- East Salem - Juniata County
- East Sharpsburg - Blair County
- East Uniontown - Fayette County
- East Waterford - Juniata County
- East York - York County
- Eddington - Bucks County
- Edenborn - Fayette County
- Edenburg - Berks County
- Edgewood - Northumberland County
- Edie - Somerset County
- Effort - Monroe County
- Egypt - Lehigh County
- Eighty Four - Washington County
- Elberta - Blair County
- Eldorado - Blair County
- Elim - Cambria County
- Elkins Park - Montgomery County
- Elrama - Washington County
- Elysburg - Northumberland County
- Emerald Lakes - Monroe County
- Emigsville - York County
- Englewood - Schuylkill County
- Enhaut - Dauphin County
- Enlow - Allegheny County
- Enola - Cumberland County
- Espy - Columbia County
- Evansburg - Montgomery County
- Exton - Chester County
- Eyers Grove - Columbia County

== F ==
- Fairdale - Greene County
- Fairhope - Fayette County
- Fairless Hills - Bucks County
- Fairview - Erie County
- Fairview-Ferndale - Northumberland County
- Falmouth - Lancaster County
- Farmersville - Lancaster County
- Farmington - Fayette County
- Farwell - Clinton County
- Fawn Lake Forest - Pike County
- Faxon - Lycoming County
- Fayetteville - Franklin County
- Feasterville - Bucks County
- Fellsburg - Westmoreland County
- Fernville - Columbia County
- Fisherville - Blair County
- Fivepointville - Lancaster County
- Flora Dale - Adams County
- Flourtown - Montgomery County
- Flying Hills - Berks County
- Folsom - Delaware County
- Foot of Ten - Blair County
- Force - Elk County
- Forestville - Schuylkill County
- Fort Fetter - Blair County
- Fort Indiantown Gap - Lebanon County
- Fort Loudon - Franklin County
- Fort Washington - Montgomery County
- Foster Brook - McKean County
- Fostoria - Blair County
- Foundryville - Columbia County
- Fountain Springs - Schuylkill County
- Fox Chase - Berks County
- Franklin Forge - Blair County
- Frankstown - Blair County
- Frazer - Chester County
- Fredericksburg - Blair County
- Fredericksburg - Crawford County
- Fredericksburg - Lebanon County
- Fredericktown - Washington County
- Friedens - Somerset County
- Friedensburg - Schuylkill County
- Friesville - Blair County
- Frisco - Beaver County
- Frizzleburg - Lawrence County
- Frystown - Berks County
- Fullerton - Lehigh County

== G ==
- Ganister - Blair County
- Gap - Lancaster County
- Garden View - Lycoming County
- Gardners - Adams County
- Gastonville - Washington County
- Geeseytown - Blair County
- Geneva - Crawford County
- Georgetown - Lancaster County
- Georgetown - Luzerne County
- Gibraltar - Berks County
- Gibsonia - Allegheny County
- Gilbertsville - Montgomery County
- Glenburn - Lackawanna County
- Glen Lyon - Luzerne County
- Glenmoore - Chester County
- Glenshaw - Allegheny County
- Glenside - Montgomery County
- Gold Key Lake - Pike County
- Goodville - Lancaster County
- Gordonville - Lancaster County
- Gouglersville - Berks County
- Gouldsboro - Wayne & Monroe Counties
- Graceton - Indiana County
- Grantley - York County
- Granville - Mifflin County
- Grapeville - Westmoreland County
- Grassflat - Clearfield County
- Gray - Blair County
- Grazierville - Blair County
- Greenfields - Berks County
- Greenock - Allegheny County
- Greens Landing - Bradford County
- Greenwood - Blair County
- Grier City - Schuylkill County
- Grill - Berks County
- Grindstone - Fayette County
- Guilford - Franklin County
- Guys Mills - Crawford County

== H ==
- Halfway House - Montgomery County
- Hamorton - Chester County
- Hampton - Adams County
- Hannasville - Venango County
- Harleigh - Luzerne County
- Harleysville - Montgomery County
- Harmonsburg - Crawford County
- Harrison City - Westmoreland County
- Hartstown - Crawford County
- Harwick - Allegheny County
- Hasson Heights - Venango County
- Haverford College - Delaware & Montgomery Counties
- Hawk Run - Clearfield County
- Hayti - Chester County
- Hazen - Beaver County
- Hebron - Lebanon County
- Heckscherville - Schuylkill County
- Hegins - Schuylkill County
- Heidlersburg - Adams County
- Heilwood - Indiana County
- Hemlock Farms - Pike County
- Hendersonville - Washington County
- Henrietta - Blair County
- Hereford - Berks County
- Herminie - Westmoreland County
- Hershey - Dauphin County
- Hickory - Washington County
- Hickory Hills - Luzerne County
- Highland Park - Mifflin County
- Hilldale - Luzerne County
- Hiller - Fayette County
- Hokendauqua - Lehigh County
- Holiday Pocono - Carbon County
- Holters Crossing - Centre County
- Homeacre-Lyndora - Butler County
- Hometown - Schuylkill County
- Homewood at Martinsburg - Blair County
- Hopeland - Lancaster County
- Hopwood - Fayette County
- Horsham - Montgomery County
- Hostetter - Westmoreland County
- Houserville - Centre County
- Hublersburg - Centre County
- Hudson - Luzerne County
- Hummels Wharf - Snyder County
- Hunterstown - Adams County
- Hyde - Clearfield County
- Hyde Park - Berks County

== I ==
- Idaville - Adams County
- Imperial - Allegheny County
- Indian Mountain Lake - Carbon & Monroe Counties
- Inkerman - Luzerne County
- Intercourse - Lancaster County
- Iola - Columbia County
- Ironville - Blair County

== J ==
- Jacksonville - Centre County
- Jacksonville - Indiana County
- Jacksonwald - Berks County
- James City - Elk County
- Jamison City - Columbia County
- Jerome - Somerset County
- Jerseytown - Columbia County
- Joffre - Washington County
- Jonestown - Columbia County
- Jugtown - Blair County
- Julian - Centre County
- Juniata Gap - Blair County

== K ==
- Kapp Heights - Northumberland County
- Kelayres - Schuylkill County
- Kempton - Berks County
- Kenilworth - Chester County
- Kenmar - Lycoming County
- Kennerdell - Venango County
- Kerrtown - Crawford County
- Kersey - Elk County
- Kimberton - Chester County
- King of Prussia - Montgomery County
- Kirkwood - Lancaster County
- Kiskimere - Armstrong County
- Klahr - Blair County
- Klingerstown - Schuylkill County
- Kratzerville - Snyder County
- Kreamer - Snyder County
- Kulpsville - Montgomery County
- Kutztown University - Berks County
- Kylertown - Clearfield County

== L ==
- Lake Arthur Estates - Butler County
- Lake Heritage - Adams County
- Lake Latonka - Mercer County
- Lake Meade - Adams County
- Lakemont - Blair County
- Lake Winola - Wyoming County
- Lake Wynonah - Schuylkill County
- Lamar - Clinton County
- Lampeter - Lancaster County
- Landisville - Lancaster County
- Langeloth - Washington County
- Larke - Blair County
- Lattimer - Luzerne County
- Laurelton - Union County
- Laurys Station - Lehigh County
- Lavelle - Schuylkill County
- Lawnton - Dauphin County
- Lawrence - Washington County
- Lawrence Park - Erie County
- Lawson Heights - Westmoreland County
- Leamersville - Blair County
- Lebanon South - Lebanon County
- Leeper - Clarion County
- Leith-Hatfield - Fayette County
- Lemont - Centre County
- Lemont Furnace - Fayette County
- Lenape Heights - Armstrong County
- Lenkerville - Dauphin County
- Leola - Lancaster County
- Level Green - Westmoreland County
- Levittown - Bucks County
- Lightstreet - Columbia County
- Lima - Delaware County
- Lime Ridge - Columbia County
- Lincoln Park - Berks County
- Lincoln University - Chester County
- Lincolnville - Crawford County
- Linds Crossing - Blair County
- Linglestown - Dauphin County
- Linntown - Union County
- Linwood - Delaware County
- Lionville - Chester County
- Little Britain - Lancaster County
- Locustdale - Columbia & Schuylkill Counties
- Longfellow - Mifflin County
- Loop - Blair County
- Lorane - Berks County
- Lower Allen - Cumberland County
- Loyalhanna - Westmoreland County
- Lucerne Mines - Indiana County
- Lumber City - Mifflin County
- Lynnwood-Pricedale - Fayette & Westmoreland Counties

== M ==
- McAlisterville - Juniata County
- McConnellstown - Huntingdon County
- McElhattan - Clinton County
- McGovern - Washington County
- McKeansburg - Schuylkill County
- McKee - Blair County
- McKinley - Montgomery County
- McKnightstown - Adams County
- McMurray - Washington County
- Madisonburg - Centre County
- Mainville - Columbia County
- Maitland - Mifflin County
- Mammoth - Westmoreland County
- Maple Glen - Montgomery County
- Mapletown - Greene County
- Marianne - Clarion County
- Marienville - Forest County
- Marion - Franklin County
- Marlin - Schuylkill County
- Marshallton - Chester County
- Marshallton - Northumberland County
- Martinsburg Junction - Blair County
- Martins Creek - Northampton County
- Masthope - Pike County
- Mather - Greene County
- Mattawana - Mifflin County
- Maxatawny - Berks County
- Maytown - Lancaster County
- Meadowlands - Washington County
- Meadowood - Butler County
- Meridian - Butler County
- Merion Station - Montgomery County
- Mertztown - Berks County
- Messiah College - Cumberland County
- Mexico - Juniata County
- Middletown - Northampton County
- Midway - Adams County
- Mifflinville - Columbia County
- Milford Square - Bucks County
- Millerstown - Blair County
- Millerton - Tioga County
- Mill Run - Blair County
- Millsboro - Washington County
- Millwood - Westmoreland County
- Milroy - Mifflin County
- Mingoville - Centre County
- Misericordia University - Luzerne County
- Mocanaqua - Luzerne County
- Mohrsville - Berks County
- Mont Clare - Montgomery County
- Montandon - Northumberland County
- Montgomeryville - Montgomery County
- Montrose Manor - Berks County
- Monument - Centre County
- Moores Mill - Blair County
- Moose Run - Centre County
- Morea - Schuylkil County
- Morgan Hill - Northampton County
- Morgantown - Berks & Lancaster County
- Morrisdale - Clearfield County
- Morrisville - Greene County
- Moshannon - Centre County
- Mount Aetna - Berks County
- Mountainhome - Monroe County
- Mountain Top - Luzerne County
- Mount Cobb - Lackawanna County
- Mount Eagle - Centre County
- Mount Gretna Heights - Lebanon County
- Mount Morris - Greene County
- Mount Pleasant Mills - Snyder County
- Muhlenberg Park - Berks County
- Muir - Schuylkill County
- Mundys Corner - Cambria County
- Muse - Washington County

== N ==
- Naomi - Fayette County
- Nealmont - Blair County
- Needmore - Fulton County
- Nemacolin - Greene County
- New Bedford - Lawrence County
- New Berlinville - Berks County
- New Boston - Schulykill County
- Newburg - Blair County
- New Castle Northwest - Lawrence County
- New Columbia - Union County
- New Freeport - Greene County
- New Jerusalem - Berks County
- New Kingstown - Cumberland County
- Newmanstown - Lebanon County
- New Market - York County
- New Salem - Fayette County
- New Schaefferstown - Berks County
- Newtown - Schuylkill County
- Newtown Grant - Bucks County
- New Tripoli - Lehigh County
- Nittany - Centre County
- Nixon - Butler County
- Noblestown - Allegheny County
- North Bend - Clinton County
- North Philipsburg - Centre County
- North Vandergrift - Armstrong County
- North Warren - Warren County
- Northwest Harborcreek - Erie County
- Northwood - Blair County
- Norvelt - Westmoreland County
- Nottingham - Chester County
- Noxen - Wyoming County
- Numidia - Columbia County
- Nuremberg - Luzerne & Schulykill Counties

== O ==
- Oak Hills - Butler County
- Oakland - Cambria County
- Oakland - Lawrence County
- Oakwood - Lawrence County
- Oberlin - Dauphin County
- Oklahoma - Clearfield County
- Old Orchard - Northampton County
- Oley - Berks County
- Oliver - Fayette County
- Olivia - Blair County
- Oneida - Schuylkill County
- Orchard Hills - Armstrong County
- Ore Hill - Blair County
- Oreland - Montgomery County
- Oreminea - Blair County
- Orrtanna - Adams County
- Orviston - Centre County
- Orwin - Schuylkill County
- Oval - Lycoming County

== P ==
- Palmdale - Dauphin County
- Palmer Heights - Northampton County
- Paoli - Chester County
- Paradise - Lancaster County
- Pardeesville - Luzerne County
- Paris - Washington County
- Park Crest - Schuylkill County
- Park Forest Village - Centre County
- Parkville - York County
- Paxtonia - Dauphin County
- Paxtonville - Snyder County
- Pen Mar - Franklin County
- Penn Estates - Monroe County
- Penn Farms - Blair County
- Penns Creek - Snyder County
- Pennside - Berks County
- Penn State Berks - Berks County
- Penn State Erie (Behrend) - Erie County
- Pennville - York County
- Pennwyn - Berks County
- Penn Wynne - Montgomery County
- Penryn - Lancaster County
- Peru - Centre County
- Pikes Creek - Luzerne County
- Pinecroft - Blair County
- Pine Glen - Centre County
- Pine Grove Mills - Centre County
- Pine Ridge - Pike County
- Plainfield - Cumberland County
- Plains - Luzerne County
- Pleasant Gap - Centre County
- Pleasant Hill - Lebanon County
- Pleasant View - Armstrong County
- Pleasureville - York County
- Plumsteadville - Bucks County
- Plymouth Meeting - Montgomery County
- Plymptonville - Clearfield County
- Pocono Mountain Lake Estates - Pike County
- Pocono Pines - Monroe County
- Pocono Ranch Lands - Pike County
- Pocono Springs - Wayne County
- Pocono Woodland Lakes - Pike County
- Point View - Blair County
- Pomeroy - Chester County
- Port Trevorton - Snyder County
- Potlicker Flats - Mifflin County
- Potters Mills - Centre County
- Pottsgrove - Montgomery County
- Progress - Dauphin County
- Prospect Park - Cameron County
- Pughtown - Chester County
- Puzzletown - Blair County
- Pymatuning Central - Crawford County
- Pymatuning North - Crawford County
- Pymatuning South - Crawford County

== Q ==
- Queens Gate - York County
- Quentin - Lebanon County

== R ==
- Ramblewood - Centre County
- Ranshaw - Northumberland County
- Raubsville - Northampton County
- Rauchtown - Clinton & Lycoming Counties
- Ravine - Schuylkill County
- Reamstown - Lancaster County
- Rebersburg - Centre County
- Red Hill - Blair County
- Reedsville - Mifflin County
- Reese - Blair County
- Refton - Lancaster County
- Rehrersburg - Berks County
- Reiffton - Berks County
- Reightown - Blair County
- Reinerton - Schuylkill County
- Reinholds - Lancaster County
- Rennerdale - Allegheny County
- Renningers - Schuylkill County
- Republic - Fayette County
- Reservoir - Blair County
- Revloc - Cambria County
- Rew - McKean County
- Reynolds Heights - Mercer County
- Rheems - Lancaster County
- Riceville - Crawford County
- Richboro - Bucks County
- Richfield - Juniata & Snyder Counties
- Riverside - Cambria County
- Riverview Park - Berks County
- Robeson Extension - Blair County
- Robinson - Indiana County
- Rogersville - Greene County
- Rohrsburg - Columbia County
- Ronco - Fayette County
- Ronks - Lancaster County
- Roots - Blair County
- Rosemont - Delaware & Montgomery County
- Roslyn - Montgomery County
- Rossiter - Indiana County
- Rote - Clinton County
- Rothsville - Lancaster County
- Roulette - Potter County
- Rouzerville - Franklin County
- Rowes Run - Fayette County
- Royer - Blair County
- Runville - Centre County
- Rupert - Columbia County
- Russell - Warren County
- Russellton - Allegheny County
- Rutherford - Dauphin County

== S ==
- St. Clair - Blair County
- St. Davids - Delaware County
- St. Michael - Cambria County
- St. Vincent College - Westmoreland County
- Sadsburyville - Chester County
- Salix - Cambria County
- Salona - Clinton County
- Salunga - Lancaster County
- Sanatoga - Montgomery County
- Sand Hill - Lebanon County
- Sandy - Clearfield County
- Sandy Ridge - Centre County
- Saw Creek - Pike & Monroe Counties
- Saylorsburg - Monroe County
- Schaefferstown - Lebanon County
- Schlusser - Cumberland County
- Schnecksville - Lehigh County
- Schoeneck - Lancaster County
- Schubert - Berks County
- Scotland - Franklin County
- Seltzer - Schuylkill County
- Seneca - Venango County
- Shanor-Northvue - Butler County
- Shartlesville - Berks County
- Shavertown - Luzerne County
- Sheatown - Luzerne County
- Sheffield - Warren County
- Shelltown - Blair County
- Shellytown - Blair County
- Shenandoah Heights - Schuylkill County
- Sheppton - Schuylkill County
- Shiloh - York County
- Shippensburg University - Cumberland County
- Sickles Corner - Blair County
- Sidman - Cambria County
- Sierra View - Monroe County
- Siglerville - Mifflin County
- Silkworth - Luzerne County
- Simpson - Lackawanna County
- Skelp - Blair County
- Ski Gap - Blair County
- Skippack - Montgomery County
- Skyline View - Dauphin County
- Slabtown - Columbia County
- Slatedale - Lehigh County
- Slickville - Westmoreland County
- Slippery Rock University - Butler County
- Slovan - Washington County
- Smith Corner - Blair County
- Smock - Fayette County
- Smoketown - Lancaster County
- Snydertown - Centre County
- Soudersburg - Lancaster County
- South Philipsburg - Centre County
- South Pottstown - Chester County
- South Temple - Berks County
- South Uniontown - Fayette County
- Southview - Washington County
- Spinnerstown - Bucks County
- Spring Drive Mobile Home Park - Blair County
- Spring Hill - Cambria County
- Spring House - Montgomery County
- Spring Mills - Centre County
- Springmont - Berks County
- Spring Mount - Montgomery County
- Spring Ridge - Berks County
- Sproul - Blair County
- Spry - York County
- Starbrick - Warren County
- Star Junction - Fayette County
- State Line - Franklin County
- Stevens - Lancaster County
- Stiles - Lehigh County
- Stonerstown - Bedford County
- Stonybrook - York County
- Stony Creek Mills - Berks County
- Stormstown - Centre County
- Stouchsburg - Berks County
- Stowe - Montgomery County
- Strausstown - Berks County
- Strodes Mills - Mifflin County
- Strong - Northumberland County
- Sturgeon - Allegheny County
- Summit Station - Schuylkill County
- Sunbrook - Blair County
- Sunrise Lake - Pike County
- Sun Valley - Monroe County
- Susquehanna Trails - York County
- Swartzville - Lancaster County
- Swedeland - Montgomery County
- Sweden Valley - Potter County
- Sylvan Hills - Blair County

== T ==
- Table Rock - Adams County
- Taylorstown - Washington County
- Temple - Berks County
- Templeton - Armstrong County
- Tharptown (Uniontown) - Northumberland County
- The Hideout - Wayne County
- Thompsonville - Washington County
- Thorndale - Chester County
- Timber Hills - Lebanon County
- Tipton - Blair County
- Toftrees - Centre County
- Toughkenamon - Chester County
- Towamensing Trails - Carbon County
- Treasure Lake - Clearfield County
- Tresckow - Carbon County
- Trevorton - Northumberland County
- Trevose - Bucks County
- Trexlertown - Lehigh County
- Trooper - Montgomery County
- Troxelville - Snyder County
- Trucksville - Luzerne County
- Tuscarora - Schuylkill County
- Tyler Run - York County
- Tylersburg - Clarion County
- Tylersville - Clinton County
- Tyrone Forge - Blair County

== U ==
- Union Deposit - Dauphin County
- Unionville - Butler County
- Unionville - Chester County
- University of Pittsburgh (Bradford) - Jefferson County
- University of Pittsburgh (Johnstown) - Cambria County
- Upper Exeter - Luzerne County

== V ==
- Vail - Blair County
- Valley Green - York County
- Valley View - Schuylkill County
- Valley View - York County
- Van Voorhis - Washington County
- Vicksburg - Blair County
- Vicksburg - Union County
- Village Green-Green Ridge - Delaware County
- Village Shires - Bucks County
- Villanova - Delaware & Montgomery Counties
- Vinco - Cambria County
- Virginville - Berks County
- Vowinckel - Clarion County

== W ==
- Wagner - Mifflin County
- Wakefield - Lancaster County
- Wallenpaupack Lake Estates - Wayne County
- Waller - Columbia County
- Walnuttown - Berks County
- Wanamie - Luzerne County
- Warminster Heights - Bucks County
- Washington Boro - Lancaster County
- Waverly - Lackawanna County
- Wayne - Delaware County
- Wayne Heights - Franklin County
- Webster - Westmoreland County
- Weedville - Elk County
- Weigelstown - York County
- Weissport East - Carbon County
- Wescosville - Lehigh County
- West Alexander - Washington County
- West Decatur - Clearfield County
- West Fairview - Cumberland County
- West Falls - Wyoming County
- West Hamburg - Berks County
- West Hills - Armstrong County
- Westland - Washington County
- West Lawn - Berks County
- West Milton - Union County
- West Nanticoke - Luzerne County
- Weston - Luzerne County
- West Pittsburg - Lawrence County
- West Waynesburg - Greene County
- Westwood - Cambria County
- Westwood - Chester County
- West Wyomissing - Berks County
- White Mills - Wayne County
- Whitfield - Berks County
- Wickerham Manor-Fisher - Washington County
- Wiconisco - Dauphin County
- Wilburton Number One - Columbia County
- Wilburton Number Two - Columbia County
- Wilcox - Elk County
- Willow Grove - Montgomery County
- Willow Street - Lancaster County
- Wind Ridge - Greene County
- Winfield - Union County
- Witmer - Lancaster County
- Wolfdale - Washington County
- Woodbourne - Bucks County
- Woodland Heights - Venango County
- Woodlyn - Delaware County
- Woodside - Bucks County
- Woodward - Centre County
- Woolrich - Clinton County
- Wopsononock - Blair County
- Woxall - Montgomery County
- Wyano - Westmoreland County
- Wylandville - Washington County
- Wyncote - Montgomery County
- Wyndmoor - Montgomery County

== Y ==
- Yarnell - Centre County
- Yeagertown - Mifflin County
- Yellow Springs - Blair County
- Yorklyn - York County
- Yukon - Westmoreland County

== Z ==
- Zion - Centre County

== Former census-designated places ==
- Back Mountain - Luzerne County
- Beaverdale-Lloydell - Cambria County (renamed)
- Bendersville Station-Aspers - Adams County (renamed)
- Calumet-Norvelt - Westmoreland County
- Cashtown-McKnightstown - Adams County
- Devon-Berwyn - Chester County
- Fernway - Butler County
- Fox Run - Butler County
- Fredericktown-Millsboro - Washington County
- Grier City-Park Crest - Schuylkill County
- Grindstone-Rowes Run - Fayette County
- Imperial-Enlow - Allegheny County
- Lavelle-Locustdale - Schuylkill County
- Leacock-Leola-Bareville - Lancaster County
- Lionville-Marchwood - Chester County
- McChesneytown-Loyalhanna - Westmoreland County
- Mechanicsville - Montour County
- New Boston-Morea - Schuylkill County
- New Salem-Buffington - Fayette County
- North Vandergrift-Pleasant View - Armstrong County
- Reinerton-Orwin-Muir - Schuylkill County
- Salix-Beauty Line Park - Cambria County (renamed)
- Salunga-Landisville - Lancaster County
- Springetts Manor-Yorklyn - York County
- Stonybrook-Wilshire - York County
- Sturgeon-Noblestown - Allegheny County
- Tyler Run-Queens Gate - York County
- Warren South - Warren County

== See also ==
- List of cities in Pennsylvania
- List of cities in Pennsylvania (by population)
- List of towns and boroughs in Pennsylvania
- List of townships in Pennsylvania
- List of enclaves in Pennsylvania
