= Conashaugh, Pennsylvania =

Ghost town in Pennsylvania, United States

Coordinates: 41°16′16″N 74°50′57″W

Conashaugh, Pennsylvania is a ghost town in Delaware Township, Pike County, Pennsylvania between Dingmans Ferry, Pennsylvania, Milford, Pennsylvania and Birchwood Lakes, Pennsylvania. It is along the Delaware River bordering New Jersey and is now a part of the Delaware Water Gap National Recreation Area. It was originally occupied by American Civil War deserters, and is now considered a ghost town due to the decline of its original population.

== History ==
A ghost town is a town that was once popular because of a natural resource or historical event but has died down due to depletion of that source. Conashaugh was settled by American Civil War deserters. Desertion (soldiers leaving the forces without permission from a standing officer) was a major issue in the Civil War, and many deserters resided in Conashaugh. There is little research and historical evidence in Conashaugh to document these deserters, or of other historical events in the town.

== Current status ==
Conashaugh is currently a part of the Delaware River Water Gap National Recreation Area, managed by the National Park Service. It includes a large area of land surrounding the Delaware River.

== See also ==
- Conashaugh Lakes, Pennsylvania
