= Sunrise Lake, Pennsylvania =

Unincorporated community in Pennsylvania, US

Coordinates: 41°18′57″N 74°57′47″W

- Census-designated place
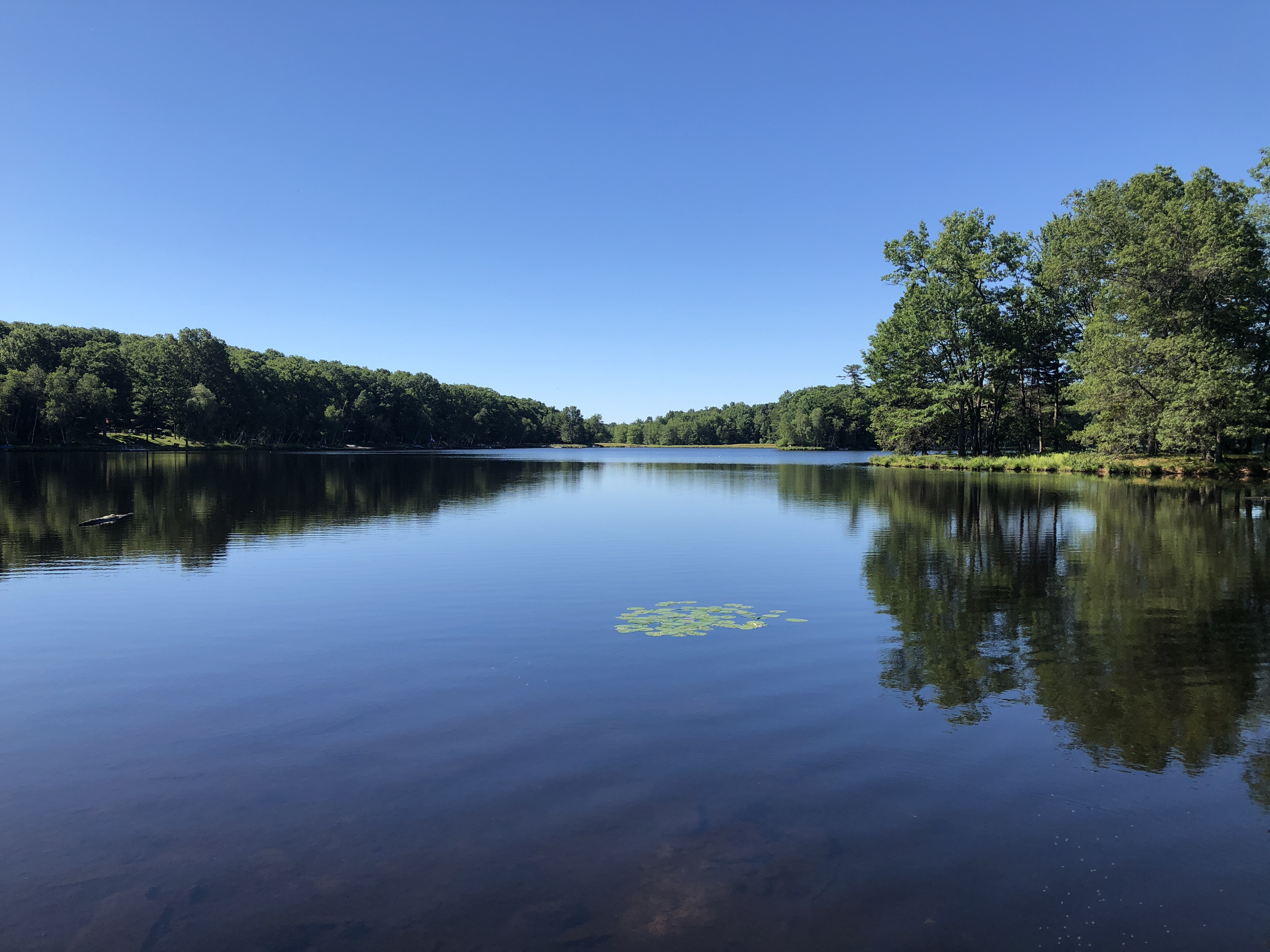
- Sunrise Lake – View toward the eastern dam from Poison Brook inlet (2018)

- Location in Pike County and the state of Pennsylvania.
- Country: United States
- State: Pennsylvania
- County: Pike

Government
  - Type: Property owners association

Population (2020)
  - Total: 1,396
- Time zone: UTC-5 (Eastern (EST))
  - Summer (DST): UTC-4 (EDT)
- ZIP code: 18337
- Area codes: 272 and 570

Sunrise Lake is a census-designated place and private lake community located in Dingman Township, Pike County in the state of Pennsylvania. The community is located along Pennsylvania Route 739 in eastern Pike County, about eight miles west of the New Jersey state line at the Delaware River. Sunrise Lake is between, and shares borders with, the CDP communities of Conashaugh Lakes and Gold Key Lake. The community of Sunrise Lake includes three lakes: Sprint Lake, Spruce Lake, and Sunrise Lake itself. As of the 2020 census, the population was 1,396 residents.

== History of the area ==
Before humans, the land was under thousands of feet of ice during the Wisconsin Glaciation. After melting glaciers left kettle lakes such as nearby Gold Key Lake, the land was left rock-strewn and rough. Considered a part of the Glaciated Low Plateau section of Pennsylvania, the land is slightly varied in elevation with Sunrise Lake's main dam measured at 1309.8 feet above sea level

Before the arrival of European settlers, the land now encompassing most of Pike County was the domain of the Lenape people. The Lenape were expelled from the area after the Walking Purchase of 1737, which dubiously placed a large amount of new territory under the control of the Province of Pennsylvania. The land was next under conflict because it was claimed by settlers from Connecticut, eventually fueling the Pennamite–Yankee Wars between 1769 and 1784. After the Revolutionary War, the former colony became today's Commonwealth of Pennsylvania and land began to be settled.

== History of Sunrise Lake ==
Like many of the private lake communities in the area such as Gold Key and Woodlands, the land which is now Sunrise Lake was originally purchased by a private developer. Sunrise Lake was initially developed around 1964, when the lake was constructed from wetlands and the surrounding land subdivided into residential housing. In subsequent years the original developer illegally developed on wetlands and was penalized for it.

A property owners' association was organized in 2009, following resident disapproval of the management of the community.

== Education ==
Local public schooling is provided by Delaware Valley School District's Dingman-Delaware campus, which consists of a Primary, Elementary, and Middle school. Delaware Valley High School in Westfall provides ninth through twelfth grade education.

The nearest higher education opportunities include Sussex County Community College to the east in Newton, New Jersey, and East Stroudsburg University to the south in East Stroudsburg.

== Transportation ==
The community's main roads lead to Route 739. 739 leads north to Interstate 84 (the closest major highway), Route 434 and to U.S. Route 6. It leads south to the Delaware Water Gap National Recreation Area and U.S. Route 209. Close minor roads include Quadrant Route 2001 or Milford Road (known locally as 01, "oh-one.") and Quadrant Route 2006, or Log Tavern Road, which is a route to Milford from just outside the community's main entrance.

The nearest bus service is CoachUSA's service to New York City's Port Authority Bus Terminal which stops in Milford.

The nearest train service is in Port Jervis, New York at Metro-North's Port Jervis station.
