= Ski Big Bear =

Ski area in Pennsylvania, United States

Coordinates: 41°31′24″N 75°01′30″W

Ski Big Bear is a skiing and snowboarding resort located in Lackawaxen Township, Pike County, Pennsylvania (in the Census Bureau CDP of Masthope). While open to the public, it is an amenity of the Masthope Mountain Community and community property owners receive a season pass as part of their annual community dues. It is also fairly unusual as the main lodge, parking areas, and facilities are located at the top of the mountain. Skiers and riders descend to the lifts before riding back to the top. Ski Big Bear has a vertical drop of 650 feet.

== Trails ==
Ski Big Bear has 18 trails and connectors.
Easiest: Snowbird (Learning Area); Whispering Run; Lower Jamboree; Upper Eagles Pass; Lower Eagles Pass; Cruisin'
More Difficult: Upper Jamboree; Grizzly; Sheldon's Way; Short Cut
Most Difficult: Upper Thundercloud; Lower Thundercloud; Devil's Dip; Lower Polar Bear
Expert Only: Screamin' Demon
Freestyle Areas: Terrain Park; Devil's Bowl

== Lifts ==
Ski Big Bear has four double chairlifts and three "Magic Carpet" conveyor lifts.
Thundercloud I (double): Serves the entire mountain.
Thundercloud II (double): Serves the entire mountain.
Grizzly (double): Mid-mountain lift servicing the Terrain Park and adjacent trails.
Little Bear (double): Serves Snowbird and upper part of Whispering Run.
Magic Carpet I (conveyor): Serves Snowbird
Magic Carpet II (conveyor): Serves Snowbird and Snow Tubing Run. Sun Kid Carpet (conveyor): Serves Snowbird
