= Dingman's Ferry Dutch Reformed Church =

Historic church in Pennsylvania, United States

- U.S. National Register of Historic Places
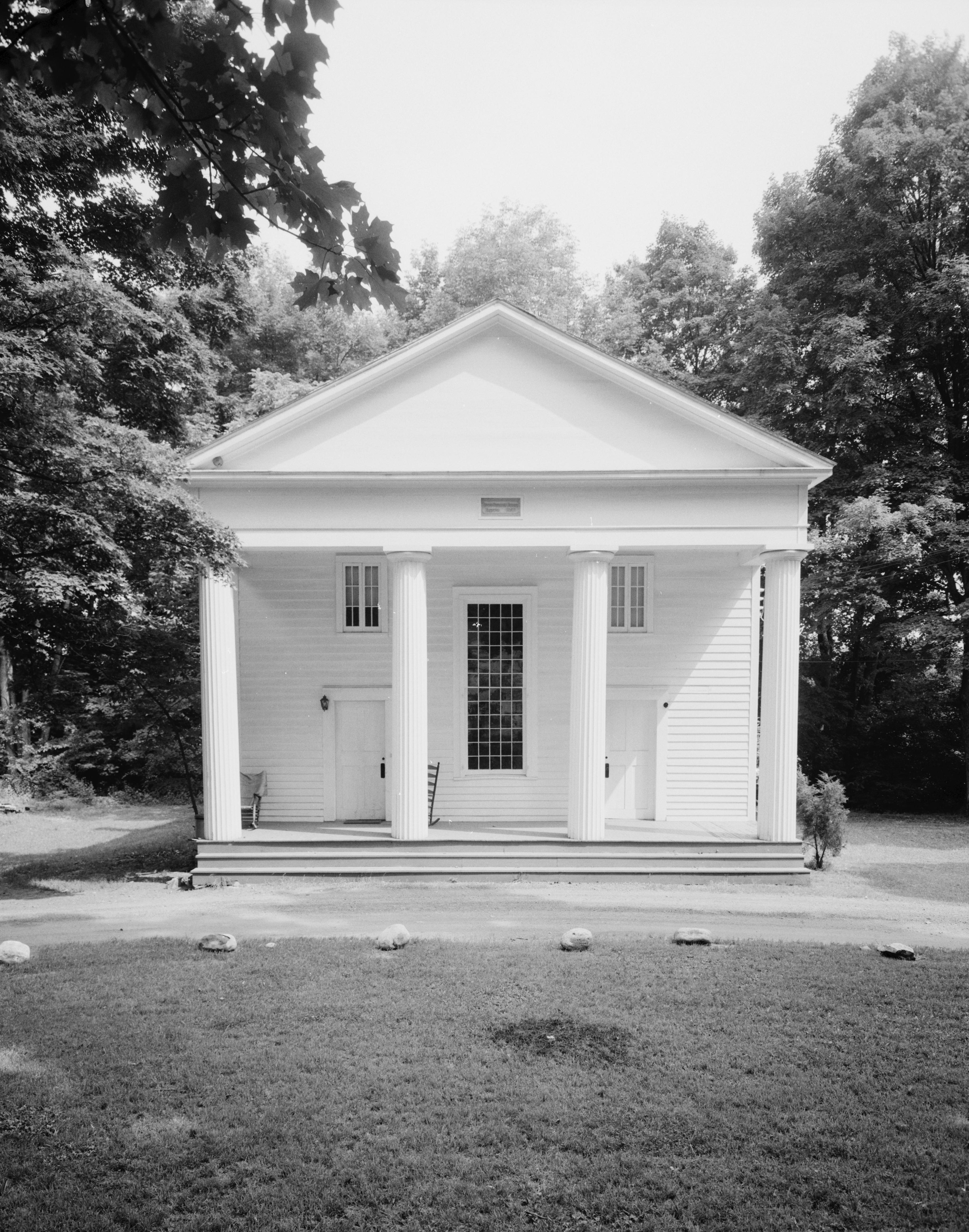

- Location within Pennsylvania Location within the United States
- Location: U.S. 209, Dingman's Ferry, Delaware Township, Pennsylvania
- Coordinates: 41°13′32″N 74°52′10″W
- Area: 0.5 acres (0.20 ha)
- Architectural style: Greek Revival
- NRHP reference No.: 79000241
- Added to NRHP: July 23, 1979

Dingman's Ferry Dutch Reformed Church is a historic Dutch Reformed church located on U.S. Route 209 in the Delaware Water Gap National Recreation Area at Dingman's Ferry, Delaware Township, Pike County, Pennsylvania. It was designed in 1837, and built in 1850 in the Greek Revival style. It is a two-story, clapboard clad frame building with a gable roof. It features a large gabled portico supported by four heavy Doric order columns.

According to the National Park Service, "The Greek Revival style Dutch Reform Church was built in 1850. Its wooden colossal temple front with four heavy fluted columns mimics the stone architecture of ancient Greece. It was converted to a residence in 1957 and has been home to antiques dealer Doug Cosh since 1972. He has leased the property since 1986."

It was added to the National Register of Historic Places in 1979.
