= Birchwood Lakes =

Birchwood Lakes may refer to:

- Birchwood Lakes, New Jersey
- Birchwood Lakes, Pennsylvania
