= Callahan House (Milford, Pennsylvania) =

Historic house in Pennsylvania, United States

- U.S. National Register of Historic Places
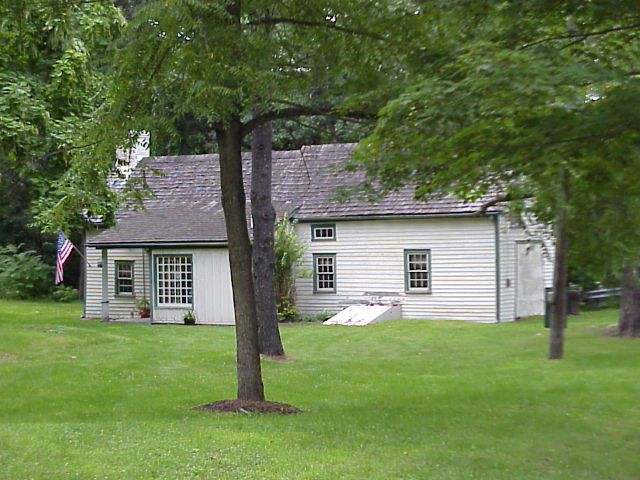
- Callahan House, National Park Service photo

- Location within Pennsylvania Location within the United States
- Location: U.S. 29, south of Milford, Dingman Township, Pennsylvania
- Coordinates: 41°19′0″N 74°48′1″W
- Area: 2 acres (0.81 ha)
- Built: c. 1800, c. 1820
- Architectural style: Dutch
- NRHP reference No.: 79000244
- Added to NRHP: July 23, 1979

The Callahan House, also known as the Jacob Helm House, is a historic home located in the Delaware Water Gap National Recreation Area south of Milford, in Dingman Township, Pike County, Pennsylvania. It was built in two sections, with the older dated to about 1800 and the later to about 1820. It is a long, 1 1/2-story, clapboard-clad frame dwelling with a steep gable roof. It features exposed chimney backs at the first floor exterior in the Dutch style, and a porch along the newer wing. It served as an inn, and is believed to have been a station on the Underground Railroad.

It was listed on the National Register of Historic Places in 1979.
