= Mary Cole Walling =

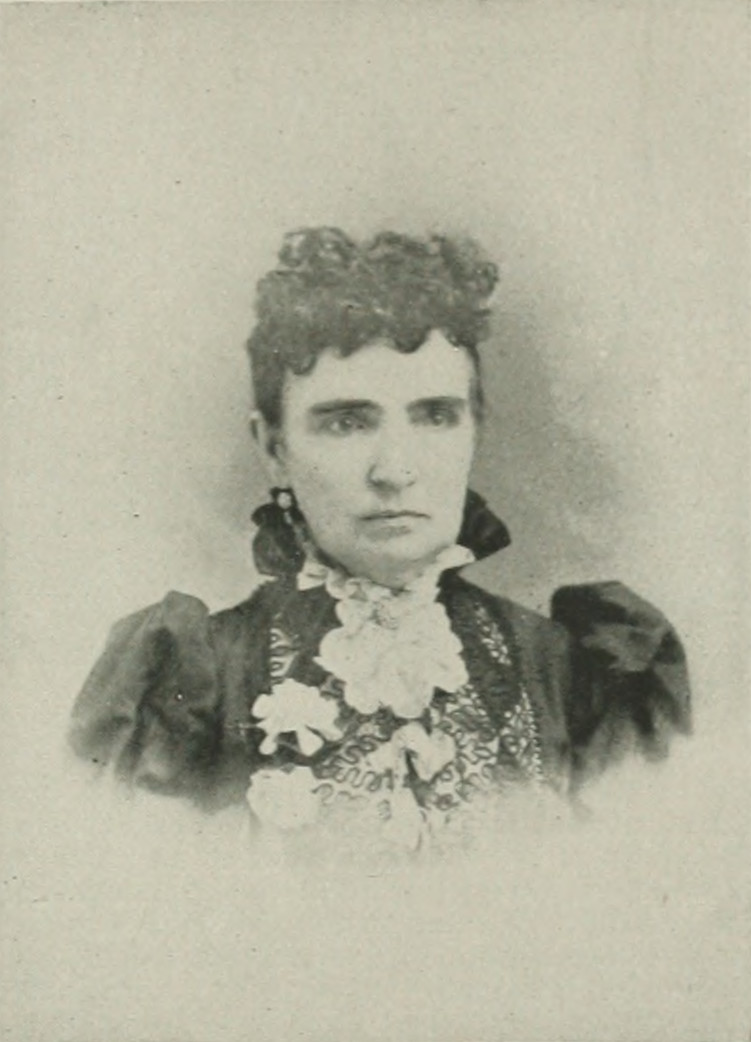
Mary Cole Walling, "A woman of the century"

Mary Cole Walling (June 19, 1838 – June 12, 1925) was an American patriot. She was known during the Civil War as "The Banished Heroine of the South." She spoke out for universal suffrage during the war and Reconstruction era. A well-written speech on "Reconstruction and Universal Suffrage", was delivered by Walling in the Senate chamber of the U.S. Capitol at Washington, D.C. May 10, 1866. It was the first time that a woman was ever granted the privilege of speaking there.

== Early years ==
Mary Cole was born in Pike County, Pennsylvania, June 19, 1838 (or 1839). She was a lineal descendant of the patrician families of Stephen Cole, of Scotland, and Hannah Chase, of England. She had twelve siblings, all of them being brothers. Her parents moved to Cass County, Illinois, in 1850.

== Career ==
In Case County, in 1850, Cole married Captain F. C. Brookman, of St. Louis, Missouri, who died shortly after of yellow fever. The young widow removed to Texas, where she married Creed A. Walling (1839–1907), a rancher. She was the mother of four children, in a happy and luxurious home, when the alarm of the Civil War occurred, and her husband joined the Confederate States Army. Due to her Union sentiments, and because almost all of her twelve brothers were with the Union Army, 1863, she was banished from her Texas home by the vigilance committee, being told to "leave the country within a few hours." Walling, with four children, the youngest still a baby, ordered the family carriage, and, with a brother eleven years of age for a driver, started through the wilds of Texas for the Union lines, with no chart or compass for her guide except for the North Star. They traveled for twenty-three days before first sight of the union flag.

Walling and her children went to live in Illinois with her parents. Upon learning that seven of her brothers were in the Union Army, where they all fought and died, she determined to lecture in defense of the Stars and Stripes. On September 4, 1865, upon being introduced to a large audience in New York City at the Cooper Institute by Horace Greeley, on the subject of "Two Years' Experience in Texas, and the Reestablishment of our Government in the South", he declared her "The greatest female speaker of the age." She went on to deliver speeches in may of the large cities of the North.

On May 10, 1866, the U.S. Senate passed a resolution according to her the privilege of addressing that honorable body, which distinction was unprecedented in the history of the United States. Before that body, she delivered her famous argument on reconstruction. In addition to Horace Greeley, she had become a friend of Henry Ward Beecher, President James A. Garfield, Wendell Phillips, Thaddeus Stevens, Charles Sumner, John A. Logan, Ulysses S. Grant, and Francis Fessenden. Surrounded by her children in her Texas home, as a first literary task, she began writing an autobiography of her antebellum days and her subsequent trials and successes.

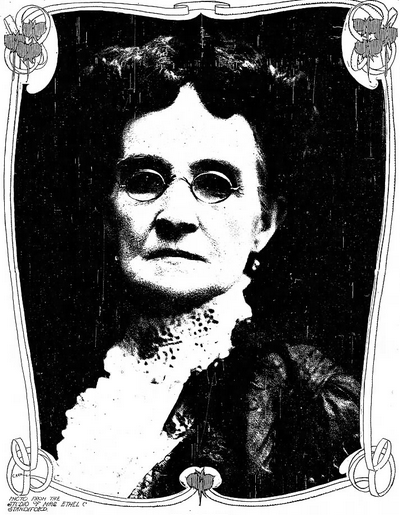
Mary Cole Walling (1907)

In 1875, the family relocated to New Albany, Ohio before returning to Texas. In 1900, Mr. and Mrs. Walling removed to Louisville, Kentucky to be closer to their sons, J. Spurgeon and John Wesley Walling, who were real estate agents of that city; their daughter, Ella, was living in Tampa, Florida. Her husband died in Louisville, 1903. She died in Louisville, June 12, 1925, and was buried in that city's Cave Hill Cemetery.
