= Hemlock Farms Community Association =

Unincorporated community in Pennsylvania, US

Coordinates: 41°18′51″N 75°03′10″W

Hemlock Farms
- Census-designated place

- Location in Pike County and the state of Pennsylvania.
- Country: United States
- State: Pennsylvania
- County: Pike

Area
  - Total: 8.15 sq mi (21.12 km^{2})
  - Land: 7.71 sq mi (19.96 km^{2})
  - Water: 0.45 sq mi (1.16 km^{2})

Population (2020)
  - Total: 3,901
  - Density: 506.2/sq mi (195.45/km^{2})
- Time zone: UTC-5 (Eastern (EST))
  - Summer (DST): UTC-4 (EDT)
- FIPS code: 42-33772
- Website: http://www.hemlockfarms.org/

Hemlock Farms Community Association (HFCA) is a census-designated place located in Blooming Grove, Porter and Dingman Townships, in Pike County in the state of Pennsylvania. The community is located south of Interstate 84, and surrounds its namesake, Hemlock Lake. As of the 2010 census, the population was 3,271 residents.

HFCA is a 4,500-acre (18 km^{2}) gated community that spans from Pennsylvania State Routes 402 and 739. It is the largest community within Lords Valley.

== Demographics ==
Historical population
Census	Pop.	Note	%±
2020	3,901		—
U.S. Decennial Census

== History ==
In 1927 William Brewster began acquiring the land that would eventually become HFCA. In 1963 Home Smith International purchased 4,500 acres for $700,000 in order to convert it from a private estate to a community with 3,726 lots. Individual property owners now own 95 percent of the lots on which more than 3,400 homes have been constructed, with roughly more than 2,000 occupied on a permanent basis, and the rest by weekend or summer residents.

All property owners are members of the HFCA, which is incorporated as a nonprofit corporation, and which holds title to the roads, lakes, ponds, green belt and other common areas within the community.

== Infrastructure ==
=== Amenities ===
Within HFCA there are four lakes, each containing beach areas with bathhouses. Boat racks are available for rent to members at 5 different locations. There are two outdoor swimming pools with bathhouses, ten tennis courts (excluding those at the country club), two baseball fields, two basketball courts, a volleyball court, two bocce courts, a children's playground and a Teen Center.

The Steer Barn Clubhouse, features an indoor pool, sauna, steam room, kiddy pool, Jacuzzi, locker rooms, fitness center, arts and craft rooms, game room and an auditorium/theater.

Additionally HFCA has a private skating rink in the winter, their own summer camp, and private hiking trails in the development.

The Hemlock Farms Volunteer Fire and Rescue has provided fire and ambulance services to HFCA since 1969.

The Department of Public Safety is HFCA's Private Police Department which holds an active Law Enforcement ORI --(Originating Agency Identifier) assigned directly by the Federal Bureau of Investigation (FBI) approved and processed through the Pennsylvania State Police CLEAN (Commonwealth Law Enforcement Assistance Network) section. The Hemlock Farms Department of Public Safety responds to emergency and non-emergency calls. Some officers are commissioned under Title 22(Private Police Act) court appointed sworn private police officers while other officers are certified under Pennsylvania Act 235(Lethal Weapons Certification). Serious crimes and state violations are coordinated with Pennsylvania State Police (Troop R Blooming Grove Barracks) Security is provided 24/7 7 days a week to the community. In addition to providing gate attendants at 2 of the 3 entrances to the community, they also have a minimum of 2 patrol officers on at all times.

The Department of Public Works and Water Company are HFCA's essential divisions of the Hemlock Farms Community Association (HFCA). They operate, maintain, and service the vast infrastructure and utility needs for the more than 3,400 homes in this private gated community.

The DPW serves as the operational hub for community maintenance and infrastructure.Core Responsibilities: They manage road upkeep, landscaping, and snow removal for nearly 90 miles of roads. They also operate the community's Refuse/Recycling Center.Location: The Public Works facility is located on-site within Hemlock Farms.

The Water Company The community operates its own private water utility system to ensure residents have a safe and steady supply of drinking water.

Core Responsibilities: The water system is sourced from deep wells located in the Catskill Formation. The water is regularly tested, treated (with chlorine and phosphate), and distributed to over 3,400 homes.

=== Hemlock Farms Conservancy ===
The Hemlock Farms Conservancy, a 501(c)(3) entity, established in December 2009, maintains the forested areas within HFCA. Their mission is to maintain the natural beauty of HFCA.

=== Lords Valley Country Club ===
The Lords Valley Country Club (LVCC), is a private club, limited to 400 members, offering: an 18-hole golf course, 10 tennis courts, swimming, and dining facilities to its members. Although the country club is located within HFCA it is not associated with it, and its history pre-dates HFCA. In 2014 it was added to the Platinum Clubs of America's list of Five Star country clubs, ranked number 31 of 125.

The LVCC was originally chartered in 1945 as Pocono Skyline Golf Club and was located at the Monomonock Inn, Barrett Township, Monroe County, PA. In 1954, after facing several financial issues, the club was renamed to Mountain Resorts and went into inactive status. In 1963 when Western Heritage purchased the HFCA they also signed a 20-year lease with Mountain Resorts, which changed its name to Lords Valley Country Club.

In 1970 a fire broke out causing an estimated $100,000 of damages. In 1972 the LVCC exercised their right to purchase the land their country club is on. In 1973, the club's owner Home Smith sold the club to its members.

The area of HFCA was originally part of the William Brewster estate. After the home was built in 1931 he added a pool, eight-hole golf course, two-lane bowling alley and a billiards room. Today these facilities have been renovated and are part of the LVCC. In 1964 additional holes were added bringing the total to eighteen.

The par 72 golf course was designed by Norman H. Woods and receives a 71.2 rating (from the championship tees). The club's affiliations include USGA, PGA of America, Pennsylvania Golf Association, Audubon International Cooperative Sanctuary Program, Goldwater Guardian Green Sites Program, and Philadelphia Golf Association.

== Education ==
The school district for most of the area (Blooming Grove Township) is Wallenpaupack Area School District. A small portion in the south (Porter Township) is in the East Stroudsburg Area School District The section in Dingman Township, in the east, is in the Delaware Valley School District.
