= Delaware Valley High School =

Coordinates: 41.349°N 74.739°W

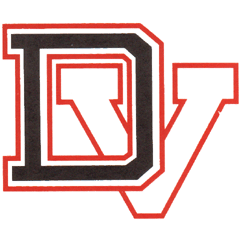
- Delaware Valley

Location
- 256 Route 6 & 209; Milford, Pike, Pennsylvania 18337-9454; United States

Information
- Type: Public
- Established: 1956
- School district: Delaware Valley School District
- NCES District ID: 420753005261
- Principal: Louis DeLauro
- Teaching staff: 109.85 (FTE)
- Grades: 9–12
- Enrollment: 1,399 (2023–2024)
- Student to teacher ratio: 12.74
- Color
- Athletics conference: PIAA District 2
- Team name: Warriors
- Website: https://dvhs.dvsd.org/

Delaware Valley High School in Milford, Pennsylvania, United States, is a high school that serves grades 9–12 and is located in Pike County. As of 2019, it serves 1,517 students. The school is operated by the Delaware Valley School District.

== Overview ==
It is located at 252 Routes 6 and 209 in Westfall Township, between Milford and Matamoras. The original high school was built in 1956 when Milford High School and Matamoras High School merged. The main part of the current high school was constructed in 1972 and has had many additions since then to meet student demand. The school is split into two sub-schools, a 9/10 High School serving grades 9 and 10 and an 11/12 High School serving grades 11 and 12. Each section has its own set of administration, guidance counselors, etc. This school also has the Delaware Valley Middle School attached, which consists of children in 6–8. They also have their own set of administration, and guidance counselors.

== Notable people ==
=== Alumni ===
- Jake Lang – American far-right activist and political candidate
