= Delaware Valley School District =

School district in Pennsylvania

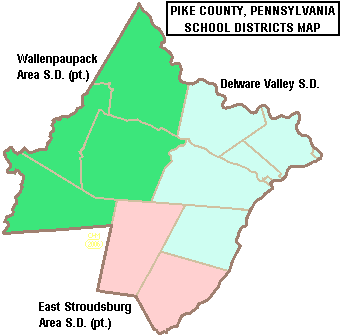

Address
- 236 Route 6 & 209 Milford, Pennsylvania, 18337; United States

District information
- Type: Public
- Motto: "Educating for life's journey."

Students and staff
- District mascot: Warriors

Other information
- Website: https://www.dvsd.org/

The Delaware Valley School District is a midsized, rural, public school district located in Pike County, Pennsylvania. Delaware Valley School District encompasses 196.12 mi^{2} (507.9 km^{2}), covering the Boroughs of Matamoras and Milford and Delaware Township, Dingman Township, Milford Township, Shohola Township and Westfall Township in Pike County, Pennsylvania. According to 2020 federal census data, it serves a resident population of 29,996. In 2009, the district residents’ per capita income was $20,553, while the median family income was $51,674. In the Commonwealth, the median family income was $49,501 and the United States median family income was $49,445, in 2010.

The district operates one High School, two Middle Schools and four Elementary Schools.

== Schools ==
=== Elementary schools ===
- Delaware Valley Elementary School (K-5th)
- Dingman Delaware Primary School (K-2nd)
- Dingman Delaware Elementary School (3rd-5th)
- Shohola Elementary School (K-5th)

=== Secondary schools ===
- Delaware Valley Middle School (6th-8th)
- Dingman Delaware Middle School (6th-8th)
- Delaware Valley High School (9th-12th)
