= Pocono Mountain Lake Estates, Pennsylvania =

Unincorporated community in Pennsylvania, US

Coordinates: 41°09′22″N 74°57′44″W

- Census-designated place
- Location in Pike County and the state of Pennsylvania.
- Country: United States
- State: Pennsylvania
- County: Pike

Area
  - Total: 2.15 sq mi (5.57 km^{2})
  - Land: 2.13 sq mi (5.51 km^{2})
  - Water: 0.023 sq mi (0.06 km^{2})

Population (2020)
  - Total: 875
  - Density: 411.3/sq mi (158.81/km^{2})
- Time zone: UTC-5 (Eastern (EST))
  - Summer (DST): UTC-4 (EDT)
- ZIP code: 18324
- Area codes: 272 and 570
- FIPS code: 42-61756

Pocono Mountain Lake Estates is a census-designated place located in Lehman Township, Pike County in the state of Pennsylvania. The community is located near U.S. Route 209, and is between and shares borders with two other CDP's, Pine Ridge and Pocono Ranch Lands. As of the 2010 census the population was 842 residents.

== Demographics ==
Historical population
Census	Pop.	Note	%±
2020	875		—
U.S. Decennial Census
