= Pocono Ranch Lands, Pennsylvania =

Unincorporated community in Pennsylvania, US

Coordinates: 41°10′39″N 74°57′10″W

- Census-designated place
- Location in Pike County and the state of Pennsylvania.
- Country: United States
- State: Pennsylvania
- County: Pike

Area
  - Total: 3.17 sq mi (8.20 km^{2})
  - Land: 3.17 sq mi (8.20 km^{2})
  - Water: 0 sq mi (0.00 km^{2})

Population (2020)
  - Total: 1,151
  - Density: 363.6/sq mi (140.38/km^{2})
- Time zone: UTC-5 (Eastern (EST))
  - Summer (DST): UTC-4 (EDT)
- FIPS code: 42-61773

Pocono Ranch Lands is a census-designated place located in northern Lehman Township, Pike County in the state of Pennsylvania. The community is located near U.S. Route 209, and is to the north and shares a southern border with another CDP, the community of Pocono Mountain Lake Estates. As of the 2010 census the population was 1,062 residents.

Pocono Ranch Lands is maintained by the Pocono Ranch Lands Property Owners Association. The Association maintains at least 250 lots that are part of a green belt and are undeveloped. Pocono Ranch Lands has several recreational opportunities, including skiing, horseback riding, hiking trails, playgrounds, ball fields and outdoor swimming pools.

== Geography ==
Pocono Ranch Lands is located at coordinates 41 ° 10'58 "N 74 ° 57'58" O . According to the United States Census Bureau, Pocono Ranch Lands has a total area of 5.2 km^{2} , all land. It is situated at an elevation of 286 meters above sea level.

== Demographics ==
Historical population
| Census | Pop. | Note | %± |
|---|---|---|---|
| 2020 | 1,151 | | — |
U.S. Decennial Census

According to the 2010 census, there were 1,062 people residing in Pocono Ranch Lands. The population density was 204.2 inhabitants per km^{2}. Of the 1,062 inhabitants, Pocono Ranch Lands was composed of 77.12% white, 11.11% were African-American, 0.19% were Amerindian, 0.85% were Asian, 0% were Pacific Islanders, 5.08% were from other races, and 5.65% belonged to two or more races. Of the total population, 19.02% were Hispanic or Latino of any race.
