= Dingman Township, Pike County, Pennsylvania =

Township in Pennsylvania, US

Dingman Township
- Township
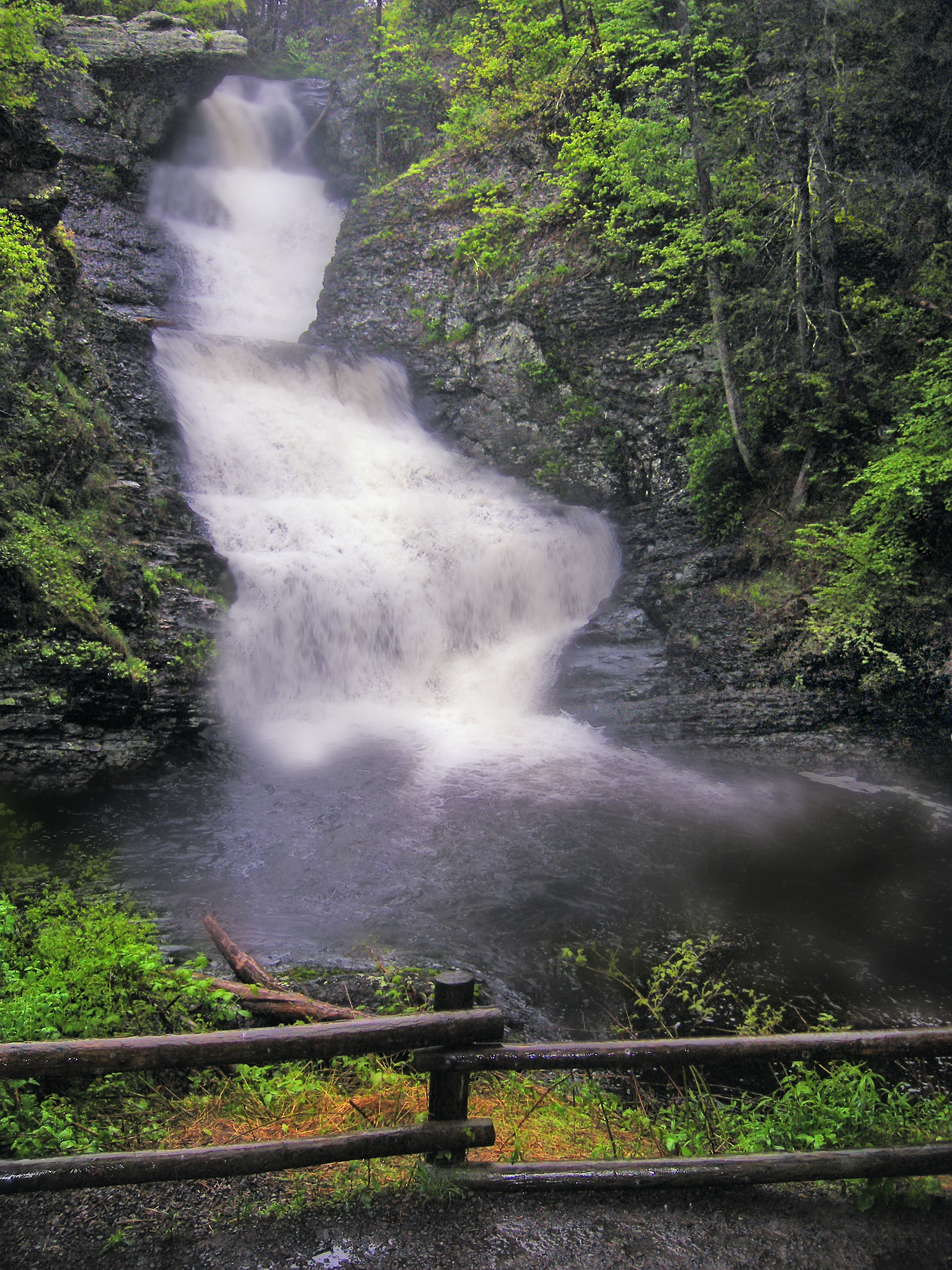
- Raymondskill Falls, Dingman Township, Pike County, within the Delaware Water Gap National Recreation Area.

- Logo

- Location in Pike County and the state of Pennsylvania.

- Location of Pennsylvania in the United States
- Coordinates: 41°20′N 74°55′W
- Country: United States
- State: Pennsylvania
- County: Pike

Area
  - Total: 60.05 sq mi (155.53 km^{2})
  - Land: 58.19 sq mi (150.71 km^{2})
  - Water: 1.86 sq mi (4.82 km^{2})
- Elevation: 1,342 ft (409 m)

Population (2020)
  - Total: 12,487 ▼
  - Density: 214.6/sq mi (82.87/km^{2})
- Time zone: UTC-5 (EST)
  - Summer (DST): UTC-4 (EDT)
- Area code: 570
- FIPS code: 42-103-19272
- Website: www.dingmantownship.org

Dingman Township is a township in Pike County, Pennsylvania, United States. The population was 12,487 at the 2020 census, up from 11,926 in 2010. The Township was named in honor of Judge Daniel Westbrook Dingman, and was created on April 17, 1832 from part of the former Upper Smithfield township.

== History ==
The Callahan House, Minisink Archeological Site, and Gifford Pinchot House are listed on the National Register of Historic Places.

== Geography ==
According to the United States Census Bureau, the township has a total area of 59.9 square miles (155 km^{2}), of which 58.2 square miles (151 km^{2}) is land and 1 square mile (2.6 km^{2}) (2.92%) is water. It contains part of the census-designated place of Hemlock Farms.

== Demographics ==
Historical population
Census	Pop.	Note	%±
2000	8,788		—
2010	11,926		35.7%
2020	12,847		7.7%
2021 (est.)	12,819		−0.2%
U.S. Decennial Census

As of the census of 2010, there were 11,926 people, 4,185 households, and 3,304 families residing in the township. The population density was 204.9 inhabitants per square mile (79.1/km^{2}). There were 5,346 housing units at an average density of 91.9/sq mi. The racial makeup of the township was 91.7% White, 3.4% African American, 0.3% Native American, 0.8% Asian, 0.1% Native Hawaiian or Pacific Islander, 1.6% from other races, and 2% from two or more races. Hispanic or Latino of any race were 8.8% of the population.

There were 4,185 households, out of which 37.4% had children under the age of 18 living with them, 66.4% were married couples living together, 8.3% had a female householder with no husband present, and 21.1% were non-families. 16.7% of all households were made up of individuals, and 5.8% had someone living alone who was 65 years of age or older. The average household size was 2.85 and the average family size was 3.22.

In the township the population was spread out, with 26.9% under the age of 18, 61.7% from 18 to 64, and 11.4% who were 65 years of age or older. The median age was 41.1 years.

The median income for a household in the township was $54,866, and the median income for a family was $56,458. Males had a median income of $41,589 versus $26,643 for females. The per capita income for the township was $21,519. About 4.1% of families and 4.2% of the population were below the poverty line, including 5.5% of those under age 18 and 5.9% of those age 65 or over.

== Census-designated places ==
For statistical purposes, the U.S. Census Bureau designates four communities within Dingman Township as CDPs: Conashaugh Lakes, Gold Key Lake, Pocono Woodland Lakes and Sunrise Lake.
