= Warren South, Pennsylvania =

Unincorporated community in Pennsylvania, US

Warren South
- Census-designated place
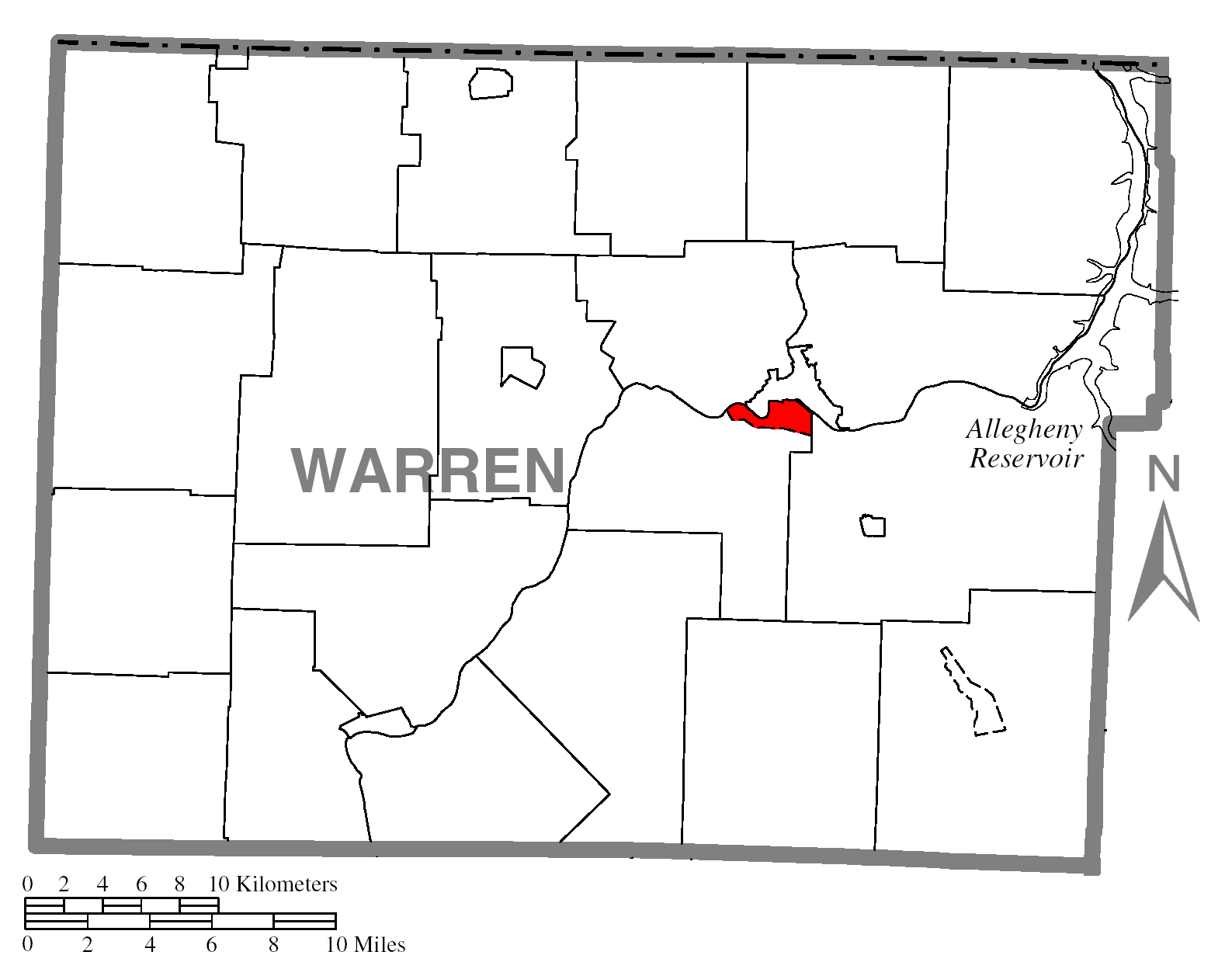
- Location of Warren South in Warren County
- Coordinates: 41°49′45″N 79°9′51″W
- Country: United States
- State: Pennsylvania
- County: Warren County

Area
  - Total: 1.8 sq mi (4.7 km^{2})
  - Land: 1.7 sq mi (4.4 km^{2})
  - Water: 0.1 sq mi (0.26 km^{2})

Population (2000)
  - Total: 1,651
  - Density: 970/sq mi (370/km^{2})
- Time zone: UTC-4 (EST)
  - Summer (DST): UTC-5 (EDT)
- Area code: 814

Warren South is a former census-designated place (CDP) in Warren County, Pennsylvania, United States. The population was 1,651 at the 2000 census.

== Geography ==
Warren South is located at 41°49′45″N 79°9′51″W (41.829247, -79.164094).

According to the United States Census Bureau, the CDP has a total area of 1.8 square miles (4.7 km^{2}), of which 1.7 square miles (4.4 km^{2}) is land and 0.1 square miles (0.26 km^{2}) (5.56%) is water.

== Demographics ==
As of the census of 2000, there were 1,651 people, 679 households, and 471 families residing in the CDP. The population density was 972.6 people per square mile (375.5 people/km^{2}). There were 708 housing units at an average density of 417.1 per square mile (161.0/km^{2}). The racial makeup of the CDP was 98.91% White, 0.06% African American, 0.18% Native American, 0.30% Asian, 0.06% from other races, and 0.48% from two or more races. Hispanic or Latino of any race were 0.30% of the population.

There were 679 households, out of which 23.6% had children under the age of 18 living with them, 61.7% were married couples living together, 4.6% had a female householder with no husband present, and 30.6% were non-families. 28.0% of all households were made up of individuals, and 15.5% had someone living alone who was 65 years of age or older. The average household size was 2.27 and the average family size was 2.75.

In the CDP, the population was spread out, with 17.7% under the age of 18, 4.2% from 18 to 24, 21.0% from 25 to 44, 29.1% from 45 to 64, and 28.0% who were 65 years of age or older. The median age was 50 years. For every 100 females, there were 85.5 males. For every 100 females age 18 and over, there were 83.4 males.

The median income for a household in the CDP was $40,991, and the median income for a family was $52,604. Males had a median income of $41,071 versus $22,946 for females. The per capita income for the CDP was $20,614. About 1.7% of families and 3.3% of the population were below the poverty line, including 1.3% of those under age 18 and none of those age 65 or over.
