= Lackawaxen Township, Pennsylvania =

Township in Pennsylvania, US

Lackawaxen Township
- Township
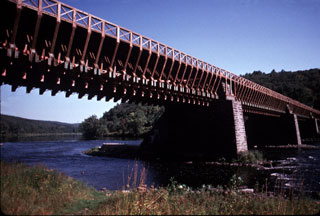
- Roebling's Delaware Aqueduct, spanning the Delaware River

- logo
- Motto(s): "A Great Place to Live, Work, and Play"
- Location in Pike County and the state of Pennsylvania.

- Location of Pennsylvania in the United States
- Coordinates: 41°29′15″N 75°02′43″W
- Country: United States
- State: Pennsylvania
- County: Pike
- Founded: 1770

Area
  - Total: 81.24 sq mi (210.41 km^{2})
  - Land: 78.44 sq mi (203.16 km^{2})
  - Water: 2.80 sq mi (7.25 km^{2})
- Elevation: 1,283 ft (391 m)

Population (2020)
  - Total: 5,066 ▲
  - Density: 64.7/sq mi (24.97/km^{2})
- Time zone: UTC-5 (EST)
  - Summer (DST): UTC-4 (EDT)
- Area code: 570
- FIPS code: 42-103-40776
- Website: Lackawaxen Township, Pennsylvania

Lackawaxen Township is the largest and northernmost township in Pike County, Pennsylvania, United States. The population was 5,066 at the 2020 census. The Delaware River, which marks the eastern boundary of the township, joins the Lackawaxen River at Lackawaxen Village. The housing communities Fawn Lake Forest and Masthope Mountain are in the township.

== History ==
The European-American settlement in 1798 adopted the Lenape name Lackawaxen, meaning "swift waters," after the river that flows twelve miles through the township.

Bands of both Algonquian-speaking Lenape and Iroquoian-speaking Seneca lived in the area through the early 19th century. Neither tribe had any substantial villages in the area, and they used the land as hunting grounds. Their tools, pot shards and bone fragments have been found at Native American rock shelters and camp sites.

The first permanent European settlers in the area were Jonathan Conkling and John Barnes, who built in 1770. In the Battle of Minisink in 1779, 40-50 European colonial settlers were killed in an engagement with a band of mostly Iroquois and Loyalists led by Colonel Joseph Brant, a Mohawk who commanded forces for the British.

During the early part of the 19th century, logging was the principal commercial activity in the area. It produced as much as 50 million board feet (120,000 m^{3}) of lumber annually. Workers floated logs downriver on the Delaware to markets in Easton or Trenton.

In 1829, the Delaware and Hudson Canal began operating between Honesdale, Pennsylvania and Kingston, New York. In its time, the canal company was the largest private commercial enterprise in the nation. It built 28 locks in Lackawaxen Township alone, raising the elevation of the canal 278 feet (85 m). Some of the old locks are still visible and several lock houses are now privately owned. Roebling's Delaware Aqueduct, built by John A. Roebling, famed engineer of the Brooklyn Bridge, was constructed in 1848 as part of the canal. It is now preserved as a National Historic Civil Engineering Landmark and National Historic Landmark by the National Park Service (NPS).

The canal linked New York City with the rich coal deposits of the Carbondale, Wilkes-Barre and Scranton areas, providing fuel for both the city's industrial foundries and heating the expanding number of residences. In 1848, the New York and Erie Railroad was built through the area; although the canal continued to operate for another fifty years, railroads eventually made canals obsolete.

At the same time, the railroad brought tourism to the area and new sources of revenue; the rugged countryside of the upper Delaware Valley became a popular destination for urban tourists. Stations were built at Lackawaxen, West Colang and Mast Hope, and elaborate resort hotels soon were developed nearby. They often provided guides to visitors for fishing, hiking and riding in the area.

Bluestone quarrying became a major enterprise in the area, starting in the mid-19th century. It was used extensively in the construction of the region's buildings and sidewalks.

From 1905 to 1918, western author Zane Grey lived in Lackawaxen with his wife and growing family. His early stories related his experiences of fishing along the upper Delaware. Listed on the National Register of Historic Places is the Greys' home from 1914 to 1918, now preserved by the NPS as a house museum, part of the Upper Delaware Scenic and Recreational River area. Grey was buried nearby in the local Union Cemetery.

Physician Orvan Hess was born here.

== Geography ==
According to the United States Census Bureau, the township has a total area of 81.2 square miles (210 km^{2}), of which 78.4 square miles (203 km^{2}) is land and 2.8 square miles (7.3 km^{2}) (3.45%) is water. A scenic area within the Upper Delaware River National Park, Lackawaxen is located about a two-hour drive from New York City. It is also located approximately twenty-two miles northwest of Milford, the county seat of Pike County.

== Demographics ==
Historical population
Census	Pop.	Note	%±
2000	4,154		—
2010	4,994		20.2%
2020	5,066		1.4%
2021 (est.)	5,215		2.9%

As of the census of 2010, there were 4,994 people, 2,099 households, and 1,453 families residing in the township. The population density was 63.7 inhabitants per square mile (24.6/km^{2}). There were 4,580 housing units at an average density of 58.4 per square mile (22.5/km^{2}). The racial makeup of the township was 94.2% White, 2.7% African American, 0.2% Native American, 0.6% Asian, 0.1% Pacific Islander, 0.7% from other races, and 1.6% from two or more races. Hispanic or Latino of any race were 4.2% of the population.

There were 2,099 households, out of which 22.1% had children under the age of 18 living with them, 58.3% were married couples living together, 7.2% had a female householder with no husband present, and 30.8% were non-families. 26% of all households were made up of individuals, and 11.8% had someone living alone who was 65 years of age or older. The average household size was 2.38 and the average family size was 2.85.

In the township the population was spread out, with 19.1% under the age of 18, 58.5% from 18 to 64, and 22.4% who were 65 years of age or older. The median age was 48.8 years.

The median income for a household in the township was $38,090, and the median income for a family was $46,856. Males had a median income of $35,758 versus $20,268 for females. The per capita income for the township was $19,119. About 7.4% of families and 9.7% of the population were below the poverty line, including 14.5% of those under age 18 and 2.9% of those age 65 or over.
