= Gold Key Lake, Pennsylvania =

Unincorporated community in Pennsylvania, US

Coordinates: 41°18′42″N 74°56′39″W

- Census-designated place
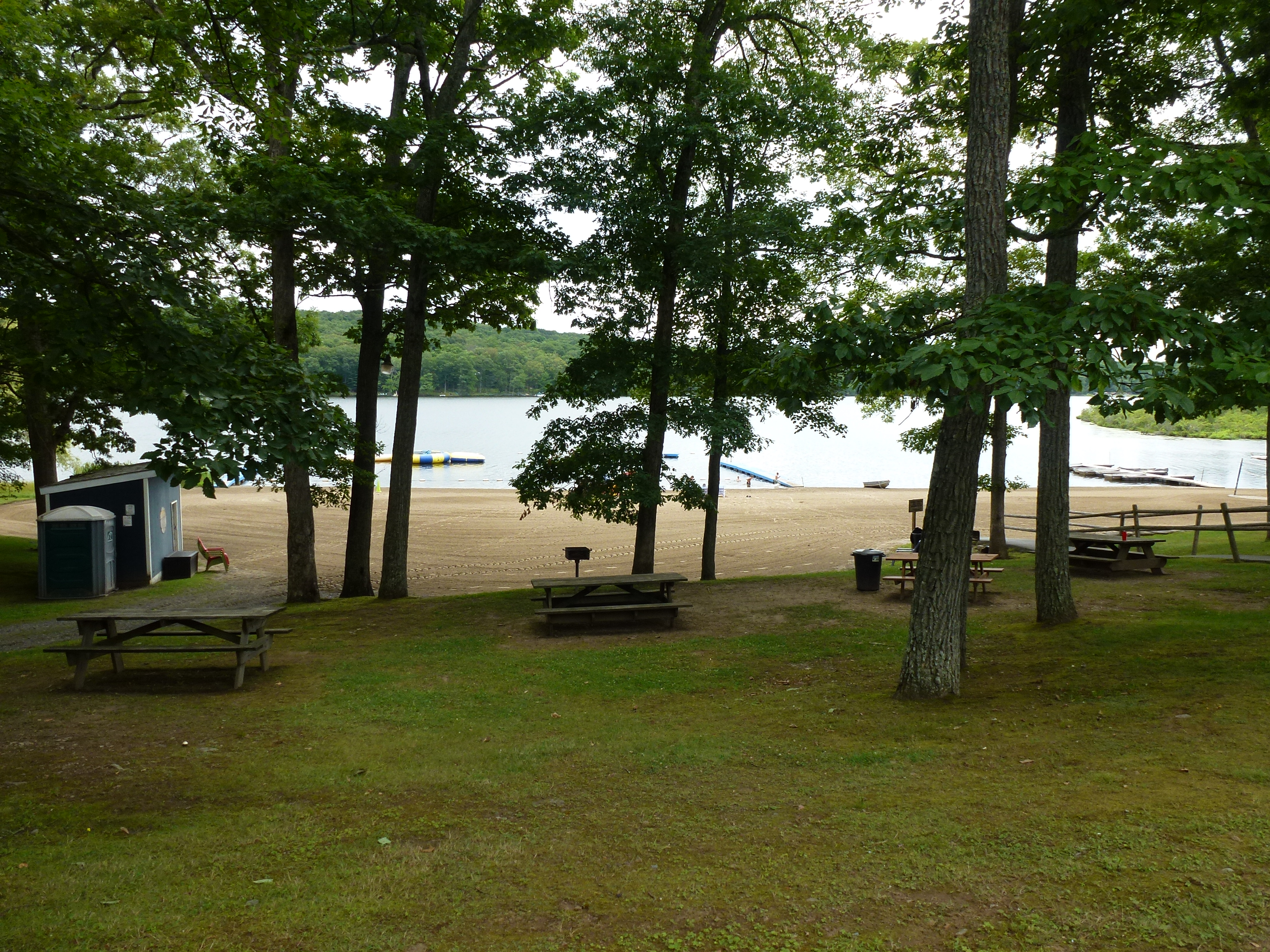
- Beach front of Gold Key Lake, Pennsylvania near lodge

- Location in Pike County and the state of Pennsylvania.
- Country: United States
- State: Pennsylvania
- County: Pike

Area
  - Total: 2.53 sq mi (6.55 km^{2})
  - Land: 2.28 sq mi (5.90 km^{2})
  - Water: 0.25 sq mi (0.66 km^{2})

Population (2020)
  - Total: 1,979
  - Density: 869/sq mi (335.6/km^{2})
- Time zone: UTC-5 (Eastern (EST))
  - Summer (DST): UTC-4 (EDT)
- ZIP code: 18337
- Area codes: 272 and 570
- FIPS code: 42-30013

Gold Key Lake is a census-designated place located in Dingman Township, Pike County in the state of Pennsylvania. The community is located north of Pennsylvania Route 739 in eastern Pike County surrounding its namesake, Gold Key Lake. It is located between, and borders the CDP communities of, Sunrise Lake and Pocono Woodland Lakes. As of the 2020 census the population was 1,979, with a median household income of $85.833.

== Demographics ==
Historical population
Census	Pop.	Note	%±
2020	1,979		—
U.S. Decennial Census
