= Pine Ridge, Pennsylvania =

Unincorporated community in Pennsylvania, US

Coordinates: 41°09′03″N 74°59′24″W

- Census-designated place
- Location in Pike County and the state of Pennsylvania.
- Country: United States
- State: Pennsylvania
- County: Pike

Area
  - Total: 2.39 sq mi (6.18 km^{2})
  - Land: 2.37 sq mi (6.14 km^{2})
  - Water: 0.015 sq mi (0.04 km^{2})

Population (2020)
  - Total: 2,464
  - Density: 1,038.8/sq mi (401.08/km^{2})
- Time zone: UTC-5 (Eastern (EST))
  - Summer (DST): UTC-4 (EDT)
- ZIP code: 18324
- Area codes: 272 and 570
- FIPS code: 42-60547

Pine Ridge is a census-designated place located in Lehman Township, Pike County in the state of Pennsylvania. The community is located near U.S. Route 209 close to the New Jersey line. Pine Ridge is just to the south and shares a northern border with another CDP, Pocono Mountain Lake Estates. As of the 2010 census, the population of Pine Ridge was 2,707 residents.

== Demographics ==
Historical population
Census	Pop.	Note	%±
2020	2,464		—
U.S. Decennial Census
