= Paxtonville, Pennsylvania =

Unincorporated community in Pennsylvania, US

Paxtonville
- Census-designated place
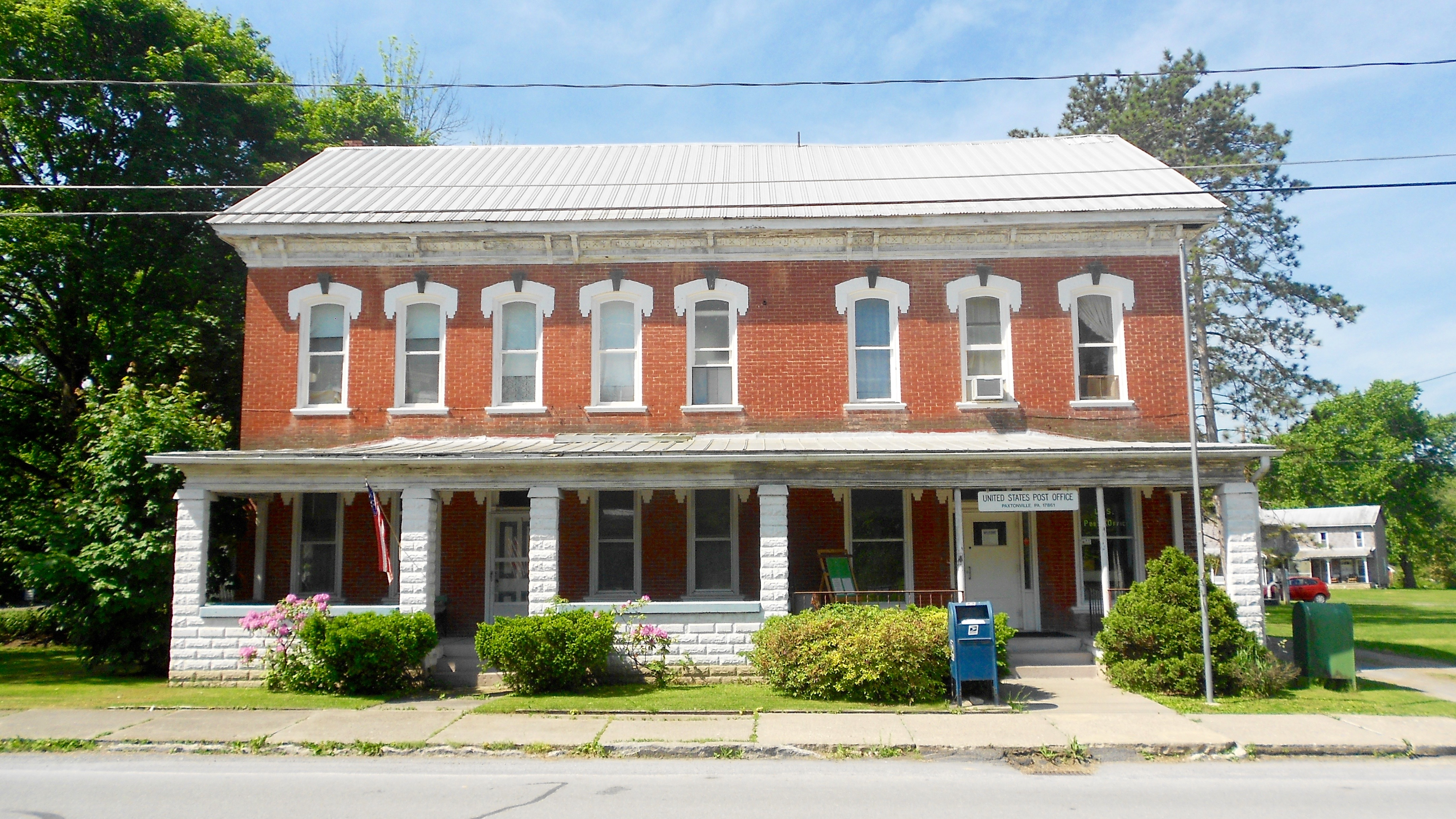
- Post office

- Location within the U.S. state of Pennsylvania Paxtonville (the United States)
- Coordinates: 40°46′14″N 77°5′8″W
- Country: United States
- State: Pennsylvania
- County: Snyder
- Township: Franklin

Area
  - Total: 0.88 sq mi (2.27 km^{2})
  - Land: 0.87 sq mi (2.26 km^{2})
  - Water: 0.0039 sq mi (0.01 km^{2})

Population (2020)
  - Total: 314
  - Density: 359.9/sq mi (138.94/km^{2})
- Time zone: UTC-5 (Eastern (EST))
  - Summer (DST): UTC-4 (EDT)
- FIPS code: 42-58536

Paxtonville is a census-designated place (CDP) in Franklin Township, Snyder County, Pennsylvania, United States. The population was 314 at the 2020 census.

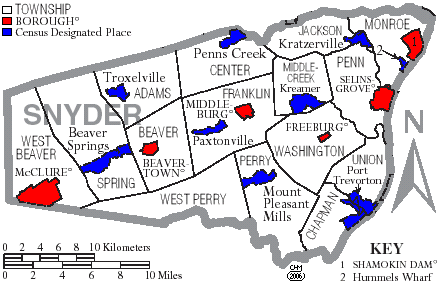
Map of Snyder County, Pennsylvania with Municipal Labels showing Boroughs (red), Townships (white), and Census-designated places (blue). Paxtonville is located in the center.

== Geography ==
Paxtonville is located at 40°46′14″N 77°5′8″W (40.770448, -77.085661).

According to the United States Census Bureau, the CDP has a total area of 0.9 square miles (2.3 km^{2}), all land.

== Demographics ==
Historical population
Census	Pop.	Note	%±
2020	314		—
U.S. Decennial Census

As of the census of 2000, there were 221 people, 92 households, and 64 families residing in the CDP. The population density was 234.9 inhabitants per square mile (90.7/km^{2}). There were 97 housing units at an average density of 103.1 per square mile (39.8/km^{2}). The racial makeup of the CDP was 100.00% White.

There were 92 households, out of which 29.3% had children under the age of 18 living with them, 57.6% were married couples living together, 7.6% had a female householder with no husband present, and 30.4% were non-families. 29.3% of all households were made up of individuals, and 17.4% had someone living alone who was 65 years of age or older. The average household size was 2.40 and the average family size was 2.95.

In the CDP, the population was spread out, with 24.9% under the age of 18, 7.7% from 18 to 24, 25.8% from 25 to 44, 24.9% from 45 to 64, and 16.7% who were 65 years of age or older. The median age was 39 years. For every 100 females, there were 95.6 males. For every 100 females age 18 and over, there were 93.0 males.

The median income for a household in the CDP was $37,917, and the median income for a family was $43,594. Males had a median income of $25,000 versus $21,932 for females. The per capita income for the CDP was $14,376. About 4.6% of families and 4.9% of the population were below the poverty line, including 4.8% of those under the age of eighteen and 14.5% of those 65 or over.

== History ==
The village of Paxtonville lies on Middle Creek and is connected to Middleburg, Koonhunter and Beavertown by the Paxtonville Road. Before the road existed connecting the main street, Paxton Street, to Route 522, in use today, the main route ran along the north side of Middle Creek to Royer's Bridge. Settled in the late 18th century, it was first known as Kern's Mill and was renamed after Robert Paxton. Just after the Civil War, an iron furnace was built there, but fell into disuse after a relatively short period of time when richer ores were found in the Great Lakes region. In the early years of the 20th century, brick-making was a major industry; this ended in the summer of 1963 when fire destroyed the Paxton Brick Company. A water-powered sawmill and cider press were in operation circa 1900. At various times businesses included a creamery, a restaurant, a cigar factory, a shirt factory, one or two general stores, a movie house, a barbershop, a grist mill and a gunsmith. As of December 2007, the town boasted a church and a feed mill, as well as a community center. The building housing the community center was previously a two-room school house in which instruction was provided for grades 1 through 8. Its last use for this purpose was in the Spring of 1955; after this time pupils were bussed to Middleburg. Around 1890 a school building stood on the north-east corner of Mill Street and the Paxtonville Road.

The soil underlying the village is principally glacial till, but approximately 150 feet west and 50 feet south of the juncture of the Paxtonville Road and Paxton Street, sedimentary rock lies just beneath the soil surface. Stone American Indian artifacts, chiefly arrow and spear points, are to be found at the north edge of town near the bank of Middle Creek. The completion of the Sunbury and Lewistown Railroad in the 1870s connected Paxtonville with these two cities, and for many years a number of daily passenger trains stopped at the Paxtonville station, which was located near the creek. Passenger service ended in the late 1920s, although freight service to Paxtonville area continued into the 1960s. For a short period of time, toward the end of the 19th century, Paxtonville was shown on railroad maps as "Benfer." A number of the oldest houses are log, but this construction is not evident because they have frame or shingle siding; they date from the early 19th century. As of 2007 there stands on the south side of Maple Avenue, approximately 100 feet west of the intersection with Paxton Street, a house of unusual construction. Built by Gabriel Gill in about 1885, it lacks a frame, but the exterior walls serve this purpose, being constructed of three layers of one inch planks, with the middle layer running at a 90-degree angle to the other two which is one form of vertical plank wall construction.

Over the years most residents have been of Pennsylvania-Dutch ancestry, as witnessed by family names such as Gill, Gift, Graybill, Hassinger, Kerstetter, Oldt, Olmstead/Umstead, Musser, Shaffer, Straub, Walter, and Wenrich. Circa 1900, the cemetery was moved from its position behind the church on the east edge of the village to its modern location on the southwestern edge. Coffins and their contents were carried on horse-drawn wagons. Immediately after World War I, donations from townspeople allowed the construction of the Memorial Hall on the west side of Paxton Street. It served a number of functions, including showing movies. During the era of silent films, these were accompanied by the Paxtonville Orchestra.
