= Fawn Lake Forest, Pennsylvania =

Unincorporated community in Pennsylvania, US

Coordinates: 41°30′48″N 75°03′29″W

- Census-designated place
- Location in Pike County and the state of Pennsylvania.
- Country: United States
- State: Pennsylvania
- County: Pike

Area
  - Total: 2.98 sq mi (7.73 km^{2})
  - Land: 2.55 sq mi (6.61 km^{2})
  - Water: 0.43 sq mi (1.12 km^{2})

Population (2020)
  - Total: 725
  - Density: 284.1/sq mi (109.68/km^{2})
- Time zone: UTC-5 (Eastern (EST))
  - Summer (DST): UTC-4 (EDT)
- ZIP code: 18428
- Area codes: 272 and 570
- FIPS code: 42-25420
- Website: http://www.fawnlakeforest.org/home.asp

Fawn Lake Forest is a census-designated place located in Lackawaxen Township, Pike County in the state of Pennsylvania. The community is located north of Pennsylvania Route 590 in northeastern Pike County, near the New York line. As of 2021, Fawn Lake Forest was estimated to have 684 residents in this sleepy development. Staff are outsourced, leading to a lack of pride of ownership in what is delivered to the homeowners in the development.

== Demographics ==
Historical population
Census	Pop.	Note	%±
2020	725		—
U.S. Decennial Census
