= Saw Creek, Pennsylvania =

Unincorporated community in Pennsylvania, US

Coordinates: 41°06′04″N 75°03′11″W

- Census-designated place
- Location in Pike County and the state of Pennsylvania.
- Country: United States
- State: Pennsylvania
- County: Pike and Monroe

Population (2010)
  - Total: 4,016
- Time zone: UTC-5 (Eastern (EST))
  - Summer (DST): UTC-4 (EDT)

Saw Creek is a census-designated place and Private community located mainly in Lehman Township, Pike County, Pennsylvania, United States, as well as a small portion located in Middle Smithfield Township in Monroe County in Pennsylvania. As of the 2010 census the population was 4,016 residents.

== Demographics ==
Historical population
Census	Pop.	Note	%±
2010	4,016		—
2020	4,118		2.5%

The hamlet had moderate population growth in the 2010s, growing 2.5% during the decade.

=== 2020 census ===
As of the 2020 census, Saw Creek had a population of 4,118. The median age was 43.1 years. 22.3% of residents were under the age of 18 and 16.1% of residents were 65 years of age or older. For every 100 females there were 94.3 males, and for every 100 females age 18 and over there were 92.7 males age 18 and over.

0.0% of residents lived in urban areas, while 100.0% lived in rural areas.

There were 1,638 households in Saw Creek, of which 30.5% had children under the age of 18 living in them. Of all households, 51.1% were married-couple households, 14.8% were households with a male householder and no spouse or partner present, and 27.0% were households with a female householder and no spouse or partner present. About 21.5% of all households were made up of individuals and 8.5% had someone living alone who was 65 years of age or older.

There were 2,660 housing units, of which 38.4% were vacant. The homeowner vacancy rate was 4.0% and the rental vacancy rate was 17.5%.

Racial composition as of the 2020 census
Race	Number	Percent
White	1,965	47.7%
Black or African American	1,050	25.5%
American Indian and Alaska Native	16	0.4%
Asian	144	3.5%
Native Hawaiian and Other Pacific Islander	4	0.1%
Some other race	410	10.0%
Two or more races	529	12.8%
Hispanic or Latino (of any race)	1,055	25.6%
