= Masthope, Pennsylvania =

Unincorporated community in Pennsylvania, US

Coordinates: 41°31′59″N 75°01′53″W

Masthope Mountain Community
- Census-designated place
- Location in Pike County and the state of Pennsylvania.
- Country: United States
- State: Pennsylvania
- County: Pike

Area
  - Total: 5.46 sq mi (14.13 km^{2})
  - Land: 5.22 sq mi (13.53 km^{2})
  - Water: 0.23 sq mi (0.60 km^{2})

Population (2020)
  - Total: 681
  - Density: 130.4/sq mi (50.34/km^{2})
- Time zone: UTC-5 (Eastern (EST))
  - Summer (DST): UTC-4 (EDT)
- FIPS code: 42-48032

Masthope Mountain Community is a census-designated place located in Lackawaxen Township, Pike County in the state of Pennsylvania. The community is located in far northeastern Pike County near the New York border. As of the 2010 census the population was 685.

Masthope is a name derived from a Native American language purported to mean "beads of glass".

It is a private community of single family homes in the most northern tier of the Poconos Mountains. The community has a lodge, built in 2005, which has a restaurant overlooking the Delaware River, as well as a ski area, horse stables, a fitness center, and a beach.

Historical population
Census	Pop.	Note	%±
2020	681		—
U.S. Decennial Census
