= Delaware Township, Pike County, Pennsylvania =

Township in Pennsylvania, US

Delaware Township
- Township
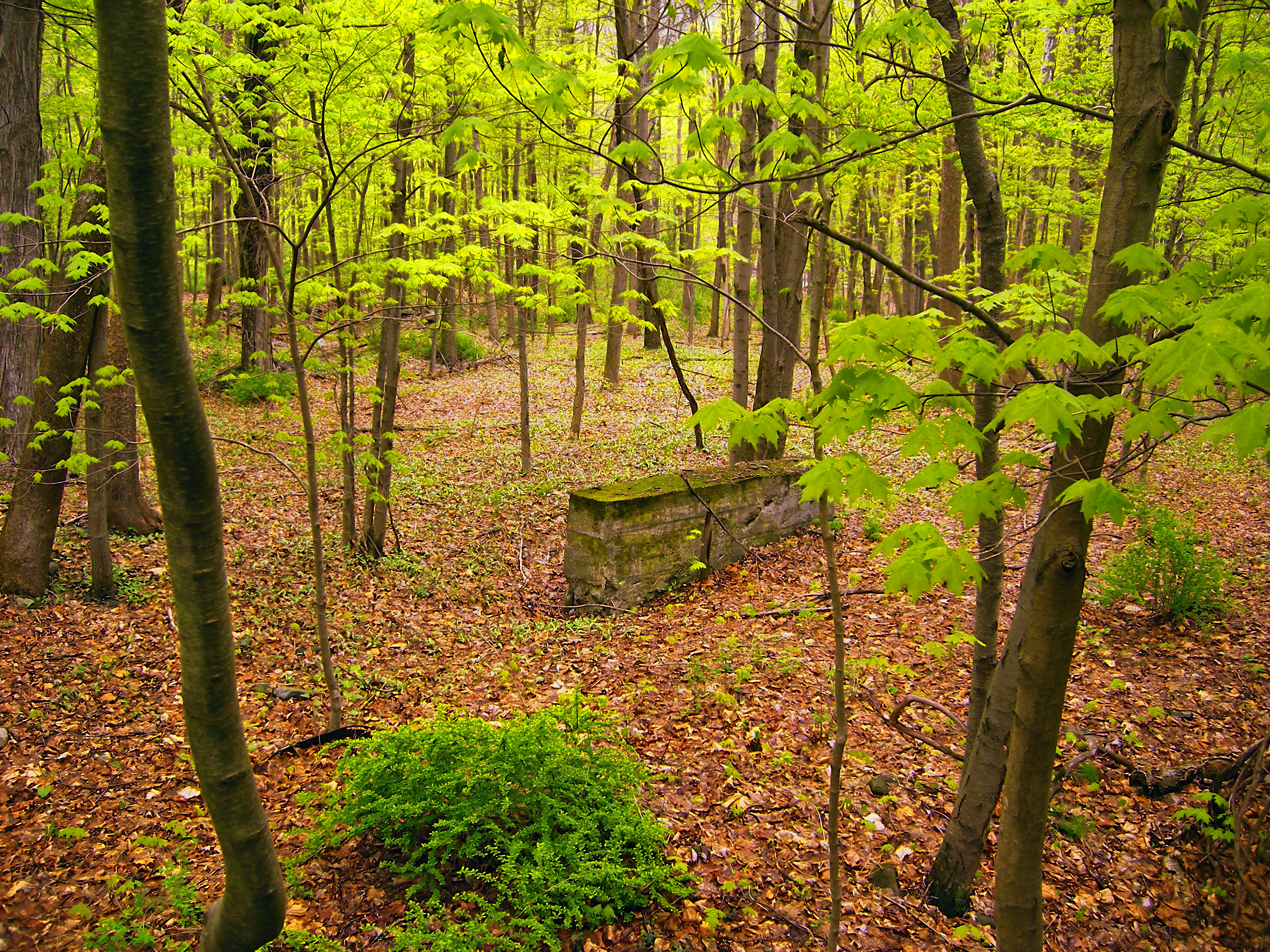
- Isolated stone wall in the woods in Delaware Township, within the Delaware Water Gap National Recreation Area

- Flag Seal Logo

- Location in Pike County and the state of Pennsylvania.

- Location of Pennsylvania in the United States
- Coordinates: 41°13′00″N 75°00′29″W
- Country: United States
- State: Pennsylvania
- County: Pike

Area
  - Total: 45.48 sq mi (117.78 km^{2})
  - Land: 43.71 sq mi (113.22 km^{2})
  - Water: 1.76 sq mi (4.56 km^{2})
- Elevation: 1,266 ft (386 m)

Population (2020)
  - Total: 7,453 ▲
  - Estimate (2021): 7,626
  - Density: 163.1/sq mi (62.98/km^{2})
- Time zone: UTC-5 (EST)
  - Summer (DST): UTC-4 (EDT)
- ZIP Code: 18328
- Area code: 570
- FIPS code: 42-103-18704
- Website: www.delawaretownshippa.gov

Delaware Township is a township in Pike County, Pennsylvania, United States. The population was 7,453 at the 2020 census. The Birchwood Lakes housing community is located in Delaware Township.

== History ==
The Dingman's Ferry Dutch Reformed Church and Marie Zimmermann Farm were listed on the National Register of Historic Places in 1979.

== Geography ==
According to the United States Census Bureau, the township has a total area of 45.5 square miles (118 km^{2}), of which 43.7 square miles (113 km^{2}) is land and 1.8 square miles (4.7 km^{2}) (3.96%) is water.

== Bridge ==
The Dingmans Ferry Bridge, the last privately owned toll bridge on the Delaware River and one of the very few left in the United States, is located here. It connects Delaware Township with Sandyston Township, New Jersey. It is operated by the Dingman's Choice and Delaware Bridge Company, chartered in 1834.

== Demographics ==
Historical population
Census	Pop.	Note	%±
2010	7,396		—
2020	7,453		0.8%
2021 (est.)	7,626		2.3%
U.S. Decennial Census

As of the census of 2010, there were 7,396 people, 2,785 households, and 2,040 families residing in the township. The population density was 169.2 inhabitants per square mile (65.3/km^{2}). There were 4,207 housing units at an average density of 96.3 per square mile (37.2/km^{2}). The racial makeup of the township was 94% White, 2.9% African American, 0.1% Native American, 0.7% Asian, 0.8% from other races, and 1.5% from two or more races. Hispanic or Latino of any race were 7% of the population.

There were 2,785 households, out of which 32.8% had children under the age of 18 living with them, 58.2% were married couples living together, 9.7% had a female householder with no husband present, and 26.8% were non-families. 20.6% of all households were made up of individuals, and 6.7% had someone living alone who was 65 years of age or older. The average household size was 2.66 and the average family size was 3.08.

In the township the population was spread out, with 24.2% under the age of 18, 64.1% from 18 to 64, and 11.7% who were 65 years of age or older. The median age was 41.2 years.

The median income for a household in the township was $46,263, and the median income for a family was $49,070. Males had a median income of $41,158 versus $26,366 for females. The per capita income for the township was $18,661. About 5.2% of families and 6.6% of the population were below the poverty line, including 8.9% of those under age 18 and 5.6% of those age 65 or over.
