= Pocono Woodland Lakes, Pennsylvania =

Unincorporated community in Pennsylvania, US

Coordinates: 41°19′12″N 74°53′56″W

- Census-designated place
- Location in Pike County and the state of Pennsylvania.
- Country: United States
- State: Pennsylvania
- County: Pike

Area
  - Total: 6.32 sq mi (16.36 km^{2})
  - Land: 6.24 sq mi (16.16 km^{2})
  - Water: 0.081 sq mi (0.21 km^{2})

Population (2020)
  - Total: 3,249
  - Density: 520.9/sq mi (201.11/km^{2})
- Time zone: UTC-5 (Eastern (EST))
  - Summer (DST): UTC-4 (EDT)
- ZIP code: 18337
- Area codes: 272 and 570
- FIPS code: 42-61788

Pocono Woodland Lakes is a census-designated place located in Dingman Township, Pike County in the state of Pennsylvania. The community is located between Interstate 84 and Pennsylvania Route 739, and is to the east of and shares a western border with another CDP community, Gold Key Lake. As of the 2010 census the population was 3,209 residents.

== Demographics ==
Historical population
Census	Pop.	Note	%±
2020	3,249		—
U.S. Decennial Census

=== 2020 census ===
As of the 2020 census, Pocono Woodland Lakes had a population of 3,249. The median age was 45.0 years. 21.7% of residents were under the age of 18 and 16.9% of residents were 65 years of age or older. For every 100 females there were 91.9 males, and for every 100 females age 18 and over there were 94.1 males age 18 and over.

0.0% of residents lived in urban areas, while 100.0% lived in rural areas.

There were 1,173 households in Pocono Woodland Lakes, of which 32.1% had children under the age of 18 living in them. Of all households, 63.9% were married-couple households, 13.8% were households with a male householder and no spouse or partner present, and 15.9% were households with a female householder and no spouse or partner present. About 16.1% of all households were made up of individuals and 8.2% had someone living alone who was 65 years of age or older.

There were 1,281 housing units, of which 8.4% were vacant. The homeowner vacancy rate was 2.2% and the rental vacancy rate was 13.6%.

Racial composition as of the 2020 census
Race	Number	Percent
White	2,799	86.1%
Black or African American	67	2.1%
American Indian and Alaska Native	8	0.2%
Asian	28	0.9%
Native Hawaiian and Other Pacific Islander	3	0.1%
Some other race	79	2.4%
Two or more races	265	8.2%
Hispanic or Latino (of any race)	307	9.4%
