= Birchwood Lakes, Pennsylvania =

Unincorporated community in Pennsylvania, US

Coordinates: 41°15′10″N 74°54′39″W

- Census-designated place
- Seal

- Location in Pike County and the state of Pennsylvania.
- Country: United States
- State: Pennsylvania
- County: Pike

Area
  - Total: 1.45 sq mi (3.75 km^{2})
  - Land: 1.25 sq mi (3.23 km^{2})
  - Water: 0.20 sq mi (0.52 km^{2})

Population (2020)
  - Total: 1,460
  - Density: 1,170.4/sq mi (451.91/km^{2})
- Time zone: UTC-5 (Eastern (EST))
  - Summer (DST): UTC-4 (EDT)
- ZIP code: 18328
- Area codes: 272 and 570
- FIPS code: 42-06490
- Website: birchwoodlakes.net

Birchwood Lakes is a census-designated place located in Delaware Township, Pike County in the state of Pennsylvania. The community is located off Pennsylvania Route 739 in eastern Pike County, near the New Jersey line. As of the 2020 census, Birchwood Lakes had a population of 1,460.

== Demographics ==
Historical population
Census	Pop.	Note	%±
2020	1,460		—
U.S. Decennial Census
