= Conashaugh Lakes, Pennsylvania =

Unincorporated community in Pennsylvania, US

Coordinates: 41°18′37″N 74°59′42″W

- Census-designated place
- Location in Pike County and the state of Pennsylvania.
- Country: United States
- State: Pennsylvania
- County: Pike

Area
  - Total: 2.76 sq mi (7.14 km^{2})
  - Land: 2.68 sq mi (6.93 km^{2})
  - Water: 0.081 sq mi (0.21 km^{2})

Population (2020)
  - Total: 1,425
  - Density: 532.7/sq mi (205.69/km^{2})
- Time zone: UTC-5 (Eastern (EST))
  - Summer (DST): UTC-4 (EDT)
- ZIP code: 18337
- Area codes: 272 and 570
- FIPS code: 42-15479
- Website: http://www.conashaughlakes.com/

Conashaugh Lakes is a census-designated place located in Dingman Township, Pike County in the state of Pennsylvania. The community is located off Pennsylvania Route 739 to the south of Interstate 84. As of the 2020 census the population was 1,425 residents.

== Demographics ==
Historical population
Census	Pop.	Note	%±
2020	1,425		—
U.S. Decennial Census
