= Pike County, Pennsylvania =

County in Pennsylvania, United States

- County
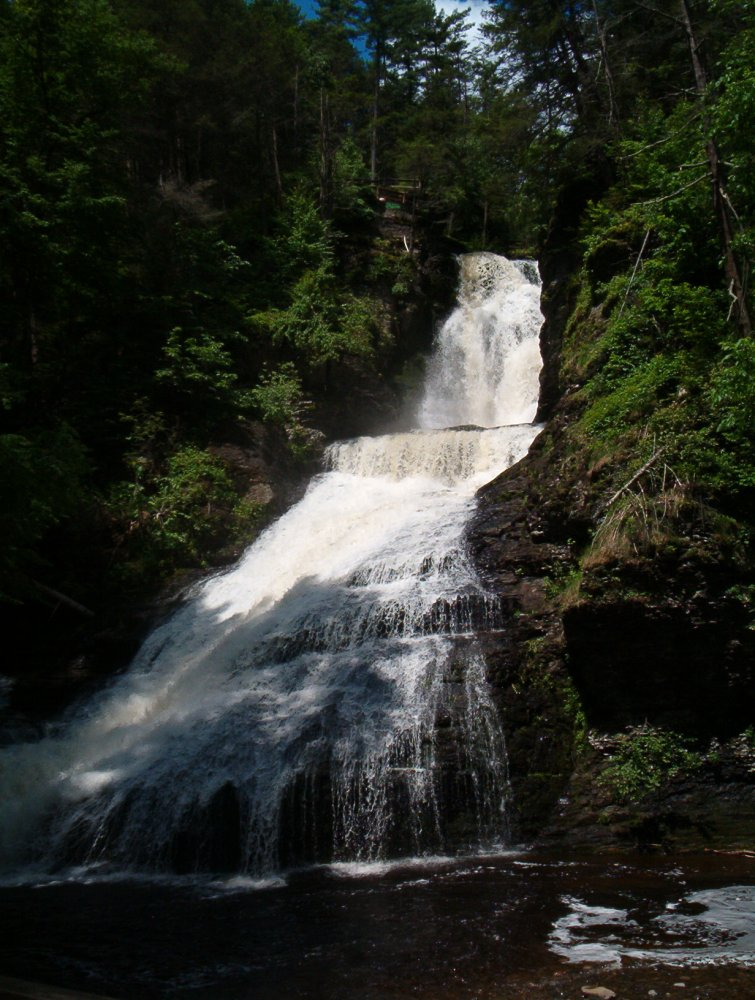
- Dingmans Falls in the Delaware Water Gap National Recreation Area

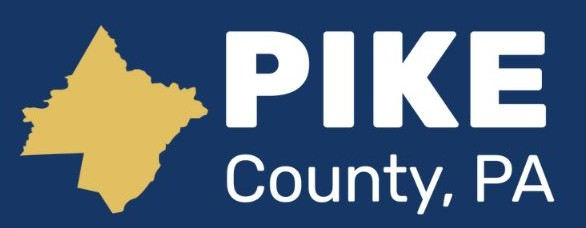
- Seal Logo

- Location within the U.S. state of Pennsylvania
- Coordinates: 41°20′N 75°02′W
- Country: United States
- State: Pennsylvania
- Founded: March 8, 1814
- Named for: Zebulon Pike
- Seat: Milford
- Largest city: Matamoras

Area
  - Total: 567 sq mi (1,470 km^{2})
  - Land: 545 sq mi (1,410 km^{2})
  - Water: 22 sq mi (57 km^{2}) 3.9%

Population (2020)
  - Total: 58,535
  - Estimate (2025): 62,808 ▲
  - Density: 107/sq mi (41.5/km^{2})
- Time zone: UTC−5 (Eastern)
  - Summer (DST): UTC−4 (EDT)
- Congressional district: 8th
- Website: www.pikepa.org

Pike County is a county in the Commonwealth of Pennsylvania, United States. As of the 2020 census, the population was 58,535. Its county seat is Milford. The county is part of the Northeast Pennsylvania region of the state. (Note: Includes Luzerne, Lackawanna, Monroe, Schuylkill, Carbon, Pike, Bradford, Wayne, Susquehanna, Wyoming and Sullivan Counties) Pike County is part of the New York Combined Statistical Area.

== History ==
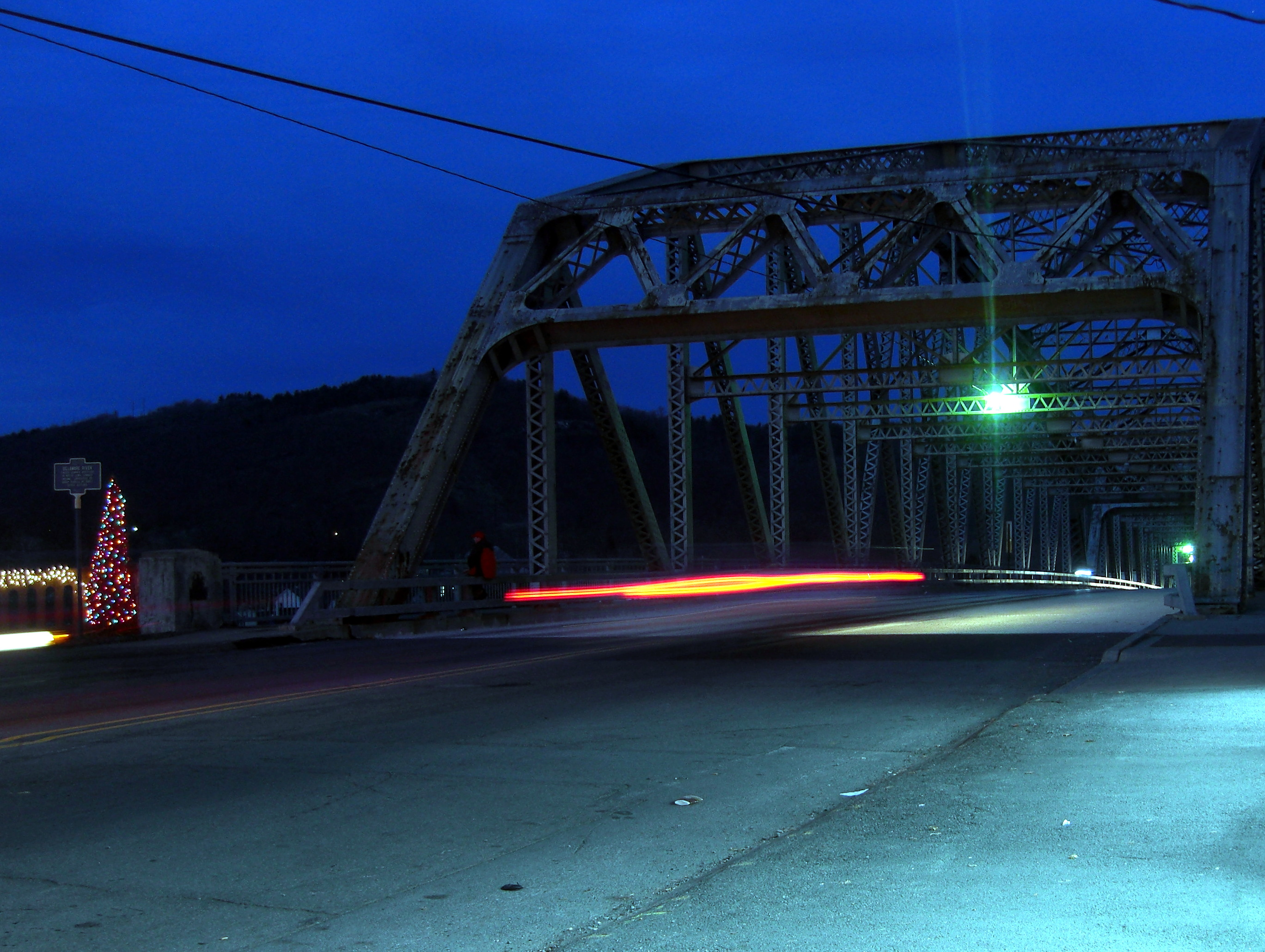
Mid-Delaware Bridge

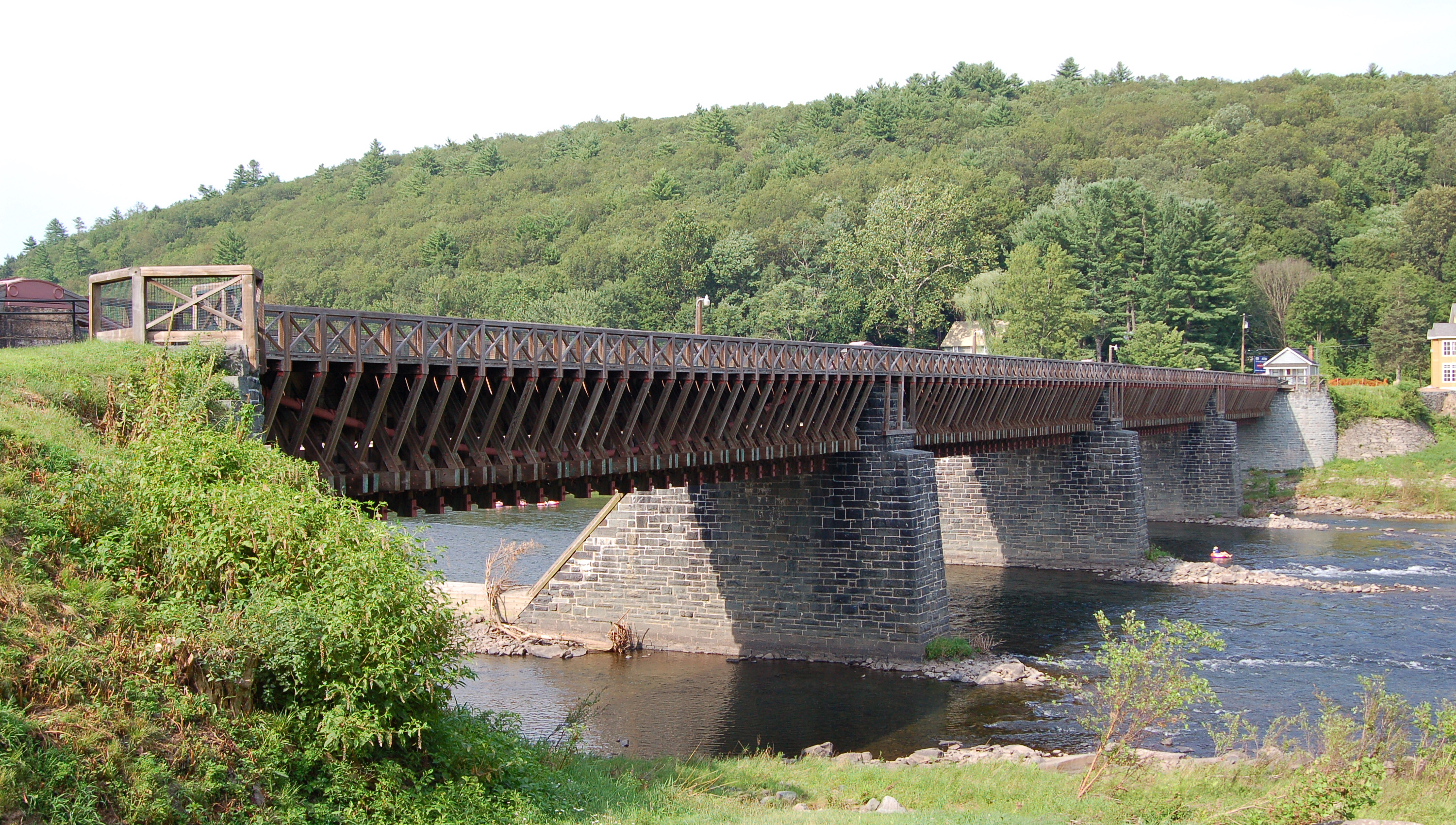
Roebling's Delaware Aqueduct

Pike County was named for General Zebulon Pike. It was organized on March 26, 1814, from part of Wayne County, Pennsylvania. Some English settlement in the area had started during the colonial years.

The longtime original inhabitants were the Lenape Native Americans, known by the English colonists as the Delaware Indians because their territory was along the Delaware River (as named by the colonists), as well as the coastal mid-Atlantic area. In 1694, Governor Benjamin Fletcher of the colony of New York sent Captain Arent Schuyler to investigate claims that the French were recruiting Indian allies for use against the English. In 1696, governor Fletcher authorized purchases of Indian land near the New York border by a number of citizens of Ulster County; their descendants became the first European settlers of what became Pike County.

Nicholas Depui was the first to settle in the area, in 1725. Thomas Quick [Sr] moved to the area that would become Milford in 1733. Andrew Dingman settled on the Delaware River at the future site of Dingmans Ferry in 1735. The early settlers got along well with the Lenape and traded with them. As settlement increased and their land practices encroached on Lenape uses, land disputes arose. The colonists' infamous Walking Purchase of 1737 swindled the Lenape out of more than half of present-day Pike County. As the Lenape realized what had happened, violent conflicts arose between them and the colonists. One notorious Indian killer was Tom Quick Jr of Milford, Pennsylvania; after his father Tom Quick Sr was killed by Indians, Tom Quick Jr is purported to have murdered numerous Lenape.

Early in the nineteenth century, coal was discovered nearby in the area that would become Carbondale. This became especially significant as the British restricted export of British coal to the United States after the War of 1812, creating a fuel shortage in rapidly expanding New York City. To get the coal to New York, developers proposed a gravity railroad from Carbondale to Honesdale, along with a canal from Honesdale to the Hudson River at Kingston.

The state of New York approved the canal proposal in 1823. Work on the 108-mile (174 km) Delaware and Hudson Canal began in 1825 and was completed in 1828. The canal system, which terminated at the Hudson River near present-day Kingston, proved profitable. But the barges had to cross the Delaware via a rope ferry across a "slackwater dam," which created bottlenecks in the canal traffic and added greatly to the cost of transportation.

John Roebling proposed continuing the canal over the river as part of an aqueduct. Built in 1848, his innovative design required only three piers, where five would ordinarily have been required; this allowed ice floes and timber rafts to pass under with less damage to the bridge. Three other suspension aqueducts were subsequently built for the canal. Roebling's Delaware Aqueduct is still standing, possibly the oldest suspension bridge in America; it has been named a National Historic Landmark.

For fifty-one years, coal flowed to New York City via the canal. But the development of railroads, which were faster, cheaper, and operated even when the canals were frozen, brought the end of the canal era. The New York and Erie Railroad supplanted the canal and in 1898 the water route was abandoned.

From 1904 to 1926, Grey Towers in the borough of Milford, Pennsylvania was the site of summer field study sessions for the Master's program of the Yale School of Forestry, together with the Forester's Hall, a commercial building that was adapted and expanded for this purpose.

In 1926, PPL Corporation built a hydroelectric plant on Wallenpaupack creek at the former village of Wilsonville. The town was evacuated and now lies under Lake Wallenpaupack, created by a dam. A crew of 2,700 men worked for two years to complete the dam for the project at a cost of $1,026,000. This required the acquisition of nearly a hundred properties, and a number of farms, barns, and homes were razed or moved. In addition, 17 miles (27 km) of roads and telephone lines were relocated, and a cemetery was moved to make way for the project.

The largely rural area of the county made it attractive as a country destination. Several camps were developed in the area of Milford, Pennsylvania, the county seat. It has several hundred late 19th and early 20th-century buildings that contribute to a National Historic District listed on the National Register of Historic Places. Yale ran summer field studies for its Master's program in forestry there from 1904 to 1926.

Since the late 20th century, Pike County has been the fastest-growing county in Pennsylvania; between 1990 and 2000, its population increased by 65.2%, and it grew an additional 16.9% between 2000 and 2004. The area has relatively low state and county taxes, and affordable housing. Interstate 80 and Interstate 84 provide rapid commutes to New York City's northern suburbs.

== Geography ==
According to the U.S. Census Bureau, the county has a total area of 567 square miles (1,470 km^{2}), of which 545 square miles (1,410 km^{2}) is land and 22 square miles (57 km^{2}) (3.9%) is water.

The terrain rises rapidly from the river valley in the east to the rolling foothills of the Poconos in the west. The highest point is one of two unnamed hills in Greene Township that top out at approximately 2,110 feet (643 m) above sea level. The lowest elevation is approximately 340 feet (100 m), at the confluence of the Bushkill and the Delaware rivers.

Because of its location, Pike County is the only county in Pennsylvania to border New York and New Jersey, both east of the Delaware River.

=== Adjacent counties ===
- Sullivan County, New York (northeast)
- Orange County, New York (east)
- Sussex County, New Jersey (east)
- Warren County, New Jersey (southeast)
- Monroe County (southwest)
- Wayne County (northwest)

=== Climate ===
Pike County has a humid continental climate that is warm-summer (Dfb), except along the Delaware River from Dingmans Ferry downriver, where it is hot-summer (Dfa). The hardiness zones are 5b and 6a. Average monthly temperatures in Milford range from 25.6 °F in January to 71.3 °F in July, while in Greentown they average from 22.8 °F in January to 68.5 °F in July.

=== National protected areas ===
- Delaware Water Gap National Recreation Area (part)
- Middle Delaware National Scenic River (part)
- Upper Delaware Scenic and Recreational River (part)

=== State protected areas ===
- Delaware State Forest (part)
- Promised Land State Park

=== Major highways ===
- I-84
- US 6
- US 206
- US 209
- PA 191
- PA 390
- PA 402
- PA 434
- PA 447
- PA 507
- PA 590
- PA 739

== Demographics ==
Historical population
Census	Pop.	Note	%±
1820	2,894		—
1830	4,843		67.3%
1840	3,832		−20.9%
1850	5,881		53.5%
1860	7,155		21.7%
1870	8,436		17.9%
1880	9,663		14.5%
1890	9,412		−2.6%
1900	8,766		−6.9%
1910	8,033		−8.4%
1920	6,818		−15.1%
1930	7,483		9.8%
1940	7,452		−0.4%
1950	8,425		13.1%
1960	9,158		8.7%
1970	11,818		29.0%
1980	18,271		54.6%
1990	27,966		53.1%
2000	46,306		65.6%
2010	57,369		23.9%
2020	58,535		2.0%
2025 (est.)	62,808	▲	7.3%
U.S. Decennial Census

=== Racial and ethnic composition ===
Pike County, Pennsylvania – Racial and ethnic composition Note: the US Census treats Hispanic/Latino as an ethnic category. This table excludes Latinos from the racial categories and assigns them to a separate category. Hispanics/Latinos may be of any race.
Race / Ethnicity (NH = Non-Hispanic)	Pop 1980	Pop 1990	Pop 2000	Pop 2010	Pop 2020	% 1980	% 1990	% 2000	% 2010	% 2020
White alone (NH)	17,883	26,890	41,569	47,549	45,375	97.88%	96.15%	89.78%	82.88%	77.52%
Black or African American alone (NH)	55	246	1,430	3,050	3,027	0.30%	0.88%	3.09%	5.32%	5.17%
Native American or Alaska Native alone (NH)	18	45	90	127	121	0.10%	0.16%	0.19%	0.22%	0.21%
Asian alone (NH)	40	129	283	583	841	0.22%	0.46%	0.61%	1.02%	1.44%
Native Hawaiian or Pacific Islander alone (NH)	x	x	3	13	14	x	x	0.01%	0.02%	0.02%
Other race alone (NH)	30	5	87	77	234	0.16%	0.02%	0.19%	0.13%	0.40%
Mixed race or Multiracial (NH)	x	x	525	797	2,204	x	x	1.13%	1.39%	3.77%
Hispanic or Latino (any race)	245	651	2,315	5,173	6,719	1.34%	2.33%	5.00%	9.02%	11.48%
Total	18,271	27,966	46,302	57,369	58,535	100.00%	100.00%	100.00%	100.00%	100.00%

=== 2020 census ===
As of the 2020 census, the county had a population of 58,535. The median age was 48.7 years. 18.9% of residents were under the age of 18 and 22.5% of residents were 65 years of age or older. For every 100 females there were 101.7 males, and for every 100 females age 18 and over there were 100.1 males.

The racial makeup of the county was 80.6% White, 5.6% Black or African American, 0.4% American Indian and Alaska Native, 1.5% Asian, <0.1% Native Hawaiian and Pacific Islander, 3.3% from some other race, and 8.6% from two or more races. Hispanic or Latino residents of any race comprised 11.5% of the population.

12.8% of residents lived in urban areas, while 87.2% lived in rural areas.

There were 23,635 households in the county, of which 26.0% had children under the age of 18 living in them. Of all households, 53.0% were married-couple households, 18.8% were households with a male householder and no spouse or partner present, and 21.5% were households with a female householder and no spouse or partner present. About 25.5% of all households were made up of individuals and 12.6% had someone living alone who was 65 years of age or older.

There were 39,676 housing units, of which 40.4% were vacant. Among occupied housing units, 84.0% were owner-occupied and 16.0% were renter-occupied. The homeowner vacancy rate was 2.7% and the rental vacancy rate was 9.3%.

=== 2010 census ===
As of the 2010 census, there were 57,369 people living in the county. The county was 88.6% Non-Hispanic White, 6.3% Black or African American, 0.5% Native American, 1.2% Asian, and 1.7% were two or more races. 10.2% of the population were of Hispanic or Latino ancestry.

=== 2000 census ===
As of the 2000 census, there were 46,302 people, 17,433 households, and 13,022 families living in the county. The population density was 85 inhabitants per square mile (33/km^{2}). There were 34,681 housing units at an average density of 63 units per square mile (24/km^{2}). The racial makeup of the county was 93.10% White, 3.27% Black or African American, 0.24% Native American, 0.62% Asian, 0.01% Pacific Islander, 1.30% from other races, and 1.47% from two or more races. 5.00% of the population were Hispanic or Latino of any race. 18.9% were of German, 18.6% Irish, 18.5% Italian, 6.2% English and 5.3% Polish ancestry.

There were 17,433 households, out of which 34.40% had children under the age of 18 living with them, 63.50% were married couples living together, 7.60% had a female householder with no husband present, and 25.30% were non-families. 20.70% of all households were made up of individuals, and 8.40% had someone living alone who was 65 years of age or older. The average household size was 2.63 and the average family size was 3.06.

In the county, the population was spread out, with 26.70% under the age of 18, 5.30% from 18 to 24, 27.70% from 25 to 44, 25.10% from 45 to 64, and 15.20% who were 65 years of age or older. The median age was 40 years. For every 100 females, there were 99.30 males. For every 100 females age 18 and over, there were 97.30 males.

=== Housing costs ===
As of Q4 2021, the median home value of all homes in Pike County is $214,981.

== Politics and government ==
United States presidential election results for Pike County, Pennsylvania
Year	Republican		Democratic		Third party(ies)	
Year	No.	%	No.	%	No.	%
1888	559	30.38%	1,265	68.75%	16	0.87%
1892	477	28.87%	1,150	69.61%	25	1.51%
1896	778	40.10%	1,123	57.89%	39	2.01%
1900	694	35.30%	1,236	62.87%	36	1.83%
1904	592	37.59%	942	59.81%	41	2.60%
1908	715	39.24%	1,069	58.67%	38	2.09%
1912	191	11.49%	995	59.83%	477	28.68%
1916	598	37.19%	976	60.70%	34	2.11%
1920	1,319	58.05%	880	38.73%	73	3.21%
1924	1,581	54.20%	993	34.04%	343	11.76%
1928	2,354	69.34%	1,024	30.16%	17	0.50%
1932	1,649	46.35%	1,844	51.83%	65	1.83%
1936	2,304	48.60%	2,396	50.54%	41	0.86%
1940	2,596	58.63%	1,818	41.06%	14	0.32%
1944	2,674	65.20%	1,408	34.33%	19	0.46%
1948	2,893	70.54%	1,208	29.46%	0	0.00%
1952	3,810	73.21%	1,383	26.58%	11	0.21%
1956	4,160	77.28%	1,219	22.65%	4	0.07%
1960	4,000	70.39%	1,676	29.49%	7	0.12%
1964	2,651	48.86%	2,753	50.74%	22	0.41%
1968	3,719	64.23%	1,617	27.93%	454	7.84%
1972	4,568	74.79%	1,385	22.68%	155	2.54%
1976	4,241	59.35%	2,775	38.83%	130	1.82%
1980	5,249	65.83%	2,132	26.74%	592	7.43%
1984	6,343	71.17%	2,503	28.08%	67	0.75%
1988	6,659	67.15%	3,097	31.23%	161	1.62%
1992	6,084	44.73%	4,382	32.21%	3,137	23.06%
1996	6,697	47.02%	5,509	38.68%	2,038	14.31%
2000	9,339	53.78%	7,330	42.21%	695	4.00%
2004	12,444	58.43%	8,656	40.64%	199	0.93%
2008	12,518	51.55%	11,493	47.33%	273	1.12%
2012	12,786	54.93%	10,210	43.86%	283	1.22%
2016	16,061	61.06%	9,268	35.24%	974	3.70%
2020	19,241	58.99%	13,052	40.02%	323	0.99%
2024	21,537	61.48%	13,132	37.49%	362	1.03%

United States Senate election results for Pike County, Pennsylvania1
Year	Republican		Democratic		Third party(ies)	
Year	No.	%	No.	%	No.	%
1994	5,773	65.74%	2,863	32.60%	145	1.65%
2000	9,856	60.39%	6,138	37.61%	327	2.00%
2006	7,208	51.76%	6,718	48.24%	0	0.00%
2012	12,267	53.81%	10,081	44.22%	450	1.97%
2018	11,772	56.61%	8,696	41.82%	326	1.57%
2024	20,869	60.30%	12,909	37.30%	831	2.40%

United States Senate election results for Pike County, Pennsylvania3
Year	Republican		Democratic		Third party(ies)	
Year	No.	%	No.	%	No.	%
1992	6,834	53.98%	5,456	43.10%	370	2.92%
1998	6,310	65.61%	2,982	31.01%	325	3.38%
2004	12,803	62.79%	7,032	34.49%	554	2.72%
2010	9,678	63.23%	5,627	36.77%	0	0.00%
2016	15,192	59.27%	9,329	36.39%	1,113	4.34%
2022	14,792	58.71%	9,821	38.98%	583	2.31%

Pennsylvania Gubernatorial election results for Pike County
Year	Republican		Democratic		Third party(ies)	
Year	No.	%	No.	%	No.	%
1970	3,041	64.14%	1,563	32.97%	137	2.89%
1974	2,898	61.39%	1,756	37.20%	67	1.42%
1978	3,516	65.71%	1,789	33.43%	46	0.86%
1982	3,325	57.46%	2,385	41.21%	77	1.33%
1986	3,529	60.10%	2,304	39.24%	39	0.66%
1990	2,529	44.75%	3,122	55.25%	0	0.00%
1994	5,583	62.34%	2,907	32.46%	466	5.20%
1998	6,843	68.45%	2,726	27.27%	428	4.28%
2002	6,482	59.97%	4,049	37.46%	278	2.57%
2006	6,551	46.98%	7,393	53.02%	0	0.00%
2010	9,894	64.39%	5,472	35.61%	0	0.00%
2014	7,553	58.47%	5,365	41.53%	0	0.00%
2018	11,408	54.85%	9,074	43.63%	318	1.53%
2022	14,371	57.18%	10,339	41.14%	423	1.68%

As of January 8, 2024, there were 43,777 registered voters in Pike County.

- Republican: 20,799 (47.51%)
- Democratic: 13,558 (30.97%)
- Other parties: 2,458 (5.61%)
- No party affiliation: 6,962 (15.90%)

In the 19th and early 20th centuries, Pike County was one of the most Democratic counties in Pennsylvania, often second to neighboring Monroe County. Since the 1920s, however, the Republican Party has been historically dominant in county-level politics. For statewide and national-level candidates, Pike County has leaned toward the Republican Party. In 2000 Republican George W. Bush won 53% to Democrat Al Gore's 42%. In 2004 Republican George W. Bush won 58% to Democrat John Kerry's 40%. Population growth (and the ensuing influx of new residents) resulted in an increase in Democratic vote share in the county throughout the 2000s; in 2006, Democratic Governor Ed Rendell carried the county with 53% of the vote, while in 2008 Republican John McCain won by a margin of only 4% and the county split its tickets between Democratic and Republican statewide candidates. In the 2010s and 2020s, however, Pike, like much of the rest of Northeastern Pennsylvania, trended against Democratic candidates.

=== County commissioners ===
- Ron Schmalzle, ViceChairman, Republican
- Matthew M. Osterberg, chairman, Republican
- Christa Caceres, Democrat

=== Other county offices ===
- Clerk of Courts and Prothonotary, Denise Fitzpatrick, Republican
- Coroner, Christopher P. Brighton, Republican
- District Attorney, Raymond Tonkin, Republican
- Recorder of Deeds and Register of Wills, Sharon Schroeder, Republican
- Sheriff, Kerry Welsh
- Treasurer, John Gilpin, Republican

=== State representatives ===
- Joseph Adams, Republican (139th district) - Blooming Grove, Dingman, Greene, Lackawaxen, Milford, Palmyra, Shohola, and Westfall Townships, and Matamoras and Milford Boroughs
- Tarah Probst, Democrat (189th district) - Delaware, Lehman, and Porter Townships

=== State Senator ===
- Lisa Baker, Republican (20th district)

=== United States Representative ===
- Rob Bresnahan, Republican (PA-8)

=== United States Senate ===
- John Fetterman, Democrat
- Dave McCormick, Republican

== Education ==
=== Public school districts ===
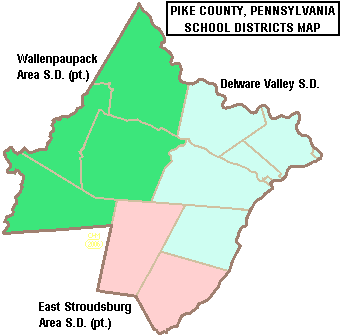
Map of Pike County, Pennsylvania School Districts

There are three school districts in the county:

- Delaware Valley School District
- East Stroudsburg Area School District (also in Monroe County)
- Wallenpaupack Area School District (also Wayne County)

In 2011, Porter Township residents successfully petitioned the Pennsylvania Secretary of Education to transfer the township from East Stroudsburg Area School District to Wallenpaupack Area School District. The appeal by East Stroudsburg Area School District was heard by the Commonwealth Court in April 2012.

=== Private ===
- Center for Developmental Disabilities of Pike Co, Ltd. – Milford
- New Life Christian Day School – Matamoras
- Sunshine Academy – Milford
- Kinderhaus Montessori of PA – Milford

== Communities ==
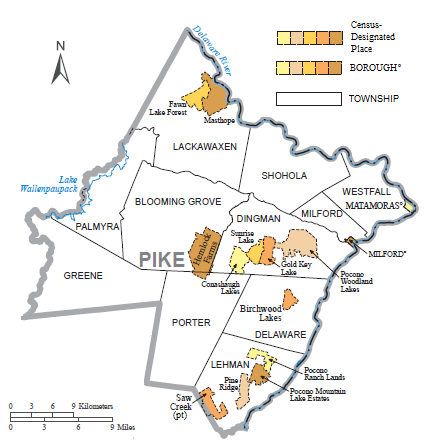
Map of Pike County with municipalities and CDPs labeled.

Under Pennsylvania law, there are four types of incorporated municipalities: cities, boroughs, townships, and, in at most two cases, towns. The following boroughs and townships are located in Pike County:

=== Boroughs ===
- Matamoras
- Milford (county seat)

=== Townships ===
- Blooming Grove
- Delaware
- Dingman
- Greene
- Lackawaxen
- Lehman
- Milford
- Palmyra
- Porter
- Shohola
- Westfall

=== Census-designated places ===
- Birchwood Lakes
- Conashaugh Lakes
- Fawn Lake Forest
- Gold Key Lake
- Hemlock Farms
- Masthope
- Pine Ridge
- Pocono Mountain Lake Estates
- Pocono Ranch Lands
- Pocono Woodland Lakes
- Saw Creek
- Sunrise Lake

=== Unincorporated community ===
- Wild Acres Lakes

=== Population ranking ===
The population ranking of the following table is based on the 2020 census of Pike County.

† county seat

Rank	City/Town/etc.	Municipal type	Population (2020 Census)
1	Saw Creek	CDP	4,016
2	Hemlock Farms	CDP	3,271
3	Pocono Woodland Lakes	CDP	3,209
4	Pine Ridge	CDP	2,707
5	Matamoras	Borough	2,362
6	Gold Key Lake	CDP	1,830
7	Sunrise Lake	CDP	1,387
8	Birchwood Lakes	CDP	1,386
9	Conashaugh Lakes	CDP	1,294
10	Pocono Ranch Lands	CDP	1,062
11	† Milford	Borough	1,103
12	Pocono Mountain Lake Estates	CDP	842
13	Fawn Lake Forest	CDP	755
14	Masthope	CDP	685

== Notable natives and residents ==
- Louis Allen, a New York Army National Guard officer killed in a fragging incident in 2005 during the Iraq War.
- James Blish, Damon Knight, Judith Merril and Kate Wilhelm (Mrs. Knight), all science fiction writers]
- Vanessa Carlton - (born 1980) singer/songwriter
- Zane Grey - (1872-1939) author of western stories and novels including Riders of the Purple Sage
- Allyn Joslyn, stage and screen actor
- Robert Litzenberger, professor emeritus at the Wharton School of the University of Pennsylvania
- Frank McCourt, author
- Charles Sanders Peirce, a philosopher and polymath, lived on a farm 3 miles from Milford, from 1887 until his 1914 death.
- Mary Pickford, silent film actress
- Gifford Pinchot - (1865–1946) was the first Chief of the United States Forest Service (1905–1910) and the Governor of Pennsylvania (1923–1927, 1931–1935).
- Al Pitrelli, guitarist
- Tom Quick, early settler
- Mary Cole Walling (1838–1925), patriot, lecturer
- Smoky Joe Wood, baseball pitcher.
- Marie Zimmermann designer and maker of jewelry and metalwork

== See also ==
- National Register of Historic Places listings in Pike County, Pennsylvania
- Camp Tamiment
