= National Register of Historic Places listings in Pike County, Pennsylvania =

Location of Pike County in Pennsylvania

This is a list of the National Register of Historic Places listings in Pike County, Pennsylvania.

This is intended to be a complete list of the properties and districts on the National Register of Historic Places in Pike County, Pennsylvania, United States. The locations of National Register properties and districts for which the latitude and longitude coordinates are included below, may be seen in a map.

There are 27 properties and districts listed on the National Register in the county. Two sites are further designated as National Historic Landmarks and another is designated as a National Historic Site.

This National Park Service list is complete through NPS recent listings posted January 23, 2026.

== Current listings ==
	Name on the Register	Image	Date listed	Location	City or town	Description
1	Brodhead Farm	Brodhead Farm	July 23, 1979 (#79000242)	Northeast of Bushkill on U.S. Route 209; 41°08′59″N 74°55′12″W	Lehman Township	
2	Callahan House	Callahan House	July 23, 1979 (#79000244)	U.S. Route 209, south of Milford; 41°19′00″N 74°48′01″W	Dingman Township	
3	D & H Canal Co. Office	D & H Canal Co. Office	August 9, 1993 (#93000715)	Northwestern side of Scenic Drive in Lackawaxen; 41°29′01″N 74°59′13″W	Lackawaxen Township	Intact 1855 house built as local office for canal; now used as bed and breakfast
4	Delaware and Hudson Canal	Delaware and Hudson Canal	November 24, 1968 (#68000051)	Delaware and Hudson Canal; 41°28′56″N 74°59′09″W	Lackawaxen Township	Extends into Wayne County
5	Delaware Aqueduct	Delaware Aqueduct	November 24, 1968 (#68000055)	Between Minisink Ford, New York and Lackawaxen; 41°28′57″N 74°59′06″W	Lackawaxen Township	
6	Dingman's Ferry Dutch Reformed Church	Dingman's Ferry Dutch Reformed Church	July 23, 1979 (#79000241)	U.S. Route 209 in Dingman's Ferry; 41°13′32″N 74°52′10″W	Delaware Township	
7	Forester's Hall	Forester's Hall	July 14, 1983 (#83002282)	Broad and Hartford Streets; 41°19′21″N 74°48′14″W	Milford	
8	Jervis Gordon Grist Mill Historic District	Jervis Gordon Grist Mill Historic District	December 26, 1985 (#85003163)	Water, Mill, and Seventh Streets; 41°19′26″N 74°48′40″W	Milford	
9	Zane Grey House	Zane Grey House	May 6, 1983 (#83002283)	Roebling Road in Lackawaxen; also 135 Lackawaxen Scenic Drive; 41°29′08″N 74°59′16″W	Lackawaxen Township	Self-designed 1905–18 home of the novelist; wrote Riders of the Purple Sage here. Now museum run by the National Park Service. Scenic Drive represents a boundaries increase of April 29, 2011
10	Hotel Fauchere and Annex	Hotel Fauchere and Annex	August 29, 1980 (#80003626)	401 and 403 Broad Street; 41°19′25″N 74°48′05″W	Milford	
11	Lord House	Lord House	June 30, 1980 (#80003625)	Pennsylvania Route 739 at Lords Valley; 41°22′04″N 75°03′49″W	Blooming Grove Township	
12	Metz Ice Plant	Metz Ice Plant	November 19, 2007 (#07001206)	Harford Street; 41°19′02″N 74°47′59″W	Milford	
13	Milford Historic District	Milford Historic District	July 23, 1998 (#98000898)	Roughly along Broad, Harford, Ann, Catharine, High, and Fourth Streets; 41°19′23″N 74°48′08″W	Milford	
14	Mill Rift Hall	Mill Rift Hall	August 9, 1993 (#93000714)	Bluestone Boulevard; 41°24′42″N 74°44′45″W	Westfall Township	
15	Minisink Archeological Site	Minisink Archeological Site	April 19, 1993 (#93000608)	In the vicinity of Minisink Island; 41°17′26″N 74°49′44″W	Dingman Township	Extends into Sussex County, New Jersey
16	Nearpass House	Nearpass House	August 19, 1993 (#93000849)	Cemetery Road; 41°25′07″N 74°44′30″W	Westfall Township	
17	Nyce Farm	Nyce Farm	July 23, 1979 (#79000240)	Northwest of Bushkill on U.S. Route 209; 41°08′24″N 74°55′50″W	Lehman Township	
18	Paupack School	Paupack School	August 29, 2016 (#16000573)	545 Pennsylvania Route 507; 41°24′28″N 75°13′38″W	Palmyra Township	
19	Peters House	Peters House	August 24, 1979 (#79000239)	U.S. Route 209 in Bushkill; 41°05′36″N 75°00′08″W	Lehman Township	
20	Pike County Courthouse	Pike County Courthouse	July 23, 1979 (#79002340)	Broad and High Streets; 41°19′28″N 74°48′04″W	Milford	
21	Gifford Pinchot House	Gifford Pinchot House	October 15, 1966 (#66000694)	Western edge of Milford; 41°19′46″N 74°49′10″W	Dingman Township	Family home of Gifford Pinchot, founder of U.S. Forest Service, is only National Historic Site run by that agency. Also home to Pinchot Institute
22	Pond Eddy Bridge	Pond Eddy Bridge	November 14, 1988 (#88002170)	Quadrant Route 1011 over the Delaware River at Pond Eddy; 41°26′21″N 74°49′13″W	Shohola Township	Extends into Sullivan County, New York
23	Promised Land State Park-Bear Wallow Cabins	Promised Land State Park-Bear Wallow Cabins	February 11, 1987 (#87000048)	10 miles (16 km) north of Canadensis on Pennsylvania Route 390; 41°19′10″N 75°12′46″W	Palmyra Township	
24	Promised Land State Park-Whittaker Lodge District	Promised Land State Park-Whittaker Lodge District	February 11, 1987 (#87000047)	10 miles (16 km) north of Canadensis on Pennsylvania Route 390; 41°18′44″N 75°11′29″W	Palmyra Township	
25	Shohola Glen Hotel	Shohola Glen Hotel	March 28, 1997 (#97000288)	100 Rohman Road; 41°28′29″N 74°54′55″W	Shohola Township	
26	Turn Store and the Tinsmith's Shop	Turn Store and the Tinsmith's Shop	September 18, 1978 (#78000260)	U.S. Route 209 in Bushkill; 41°05′32″N 75°00′11″W	Lehman Township	
27	Marie Zimmermann Farm	Marie Zimmermann Farm	November 1, 1979 (#79000243)	Southwest of Milford on U.S. Route 209; 41°15′07″N 74°51′30″W	Delaware Township	

== Former listing ==
	Name on the Register	Image	Date listed	Date removed	Location	City or town	Description
1	Bushkill Gristmill		August 3, 1979 (#79002335)	September 21, 1981	U.S. Route 209	Bushkill	Destroyed by arsonist on June 7, 1980.
2	Shanna House		January 8, 1985 (#85000075)	March 10, 1998	U.S. Route 209	Delaware Township	Destroyed by arsonists in 1989.

== See also ==
- List of Pennsylvania state historical markers in Pike County
