= Thunder Swamp Trail =

Hiking trail system in Pennsylvania

Coordinates: 41.144287°N 75.082103°W

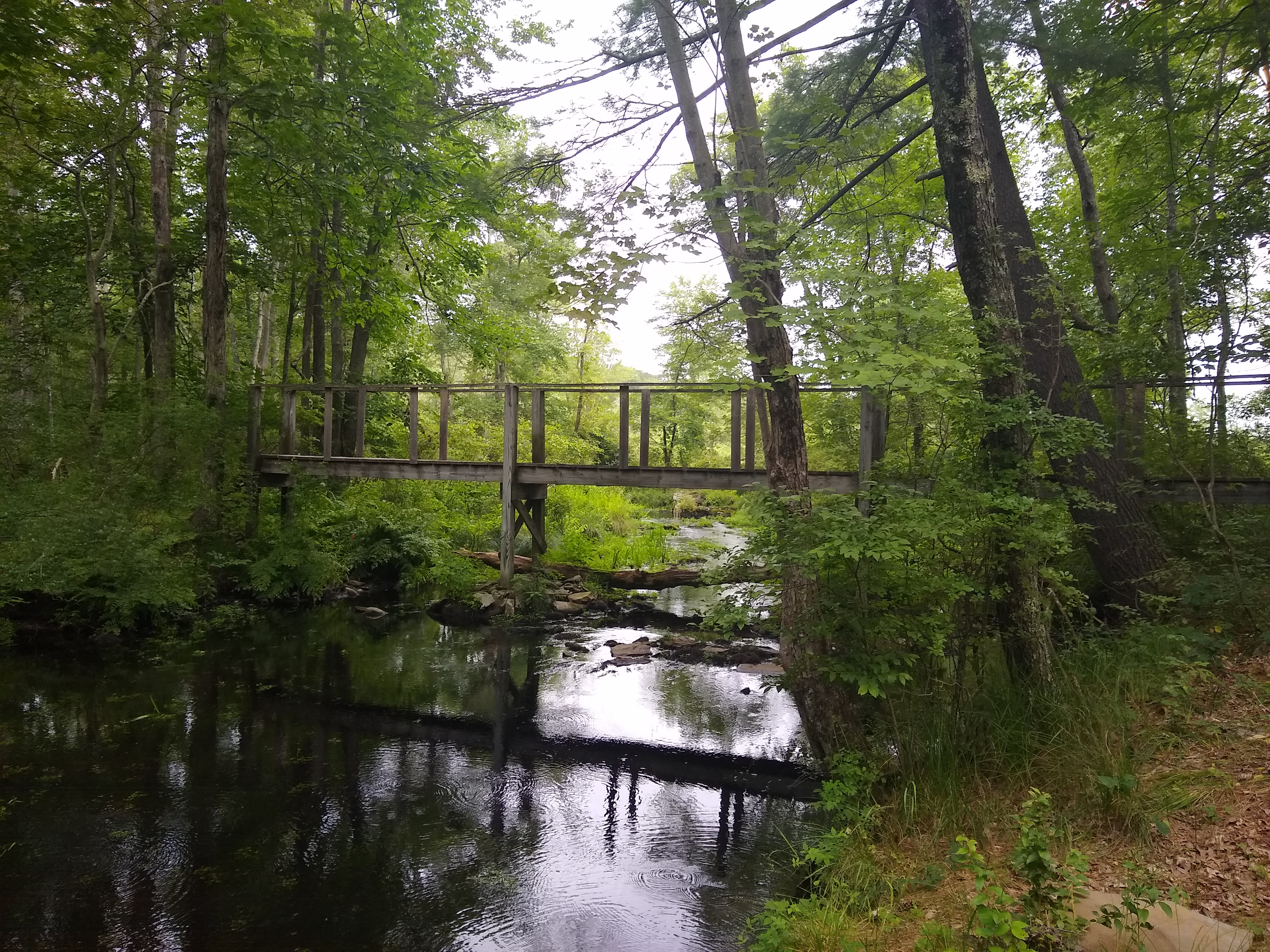
- Footbrige over Little Bushkill Creek, on the northeast spur of the Thunder Swamp Trail
- Length: 31.7 mi (51.0 km)
- Location: Pike County, Pennsylvania, US
- Trailheads: Pennsylvania Route 402, southern Pike County
- Use: Hiking
- Elevation change: Low
- Difficulty: Moderate
- Season: Year-round
- Hazards: Uneven and rocky terrain, rattlesnakes, mosquitoes, ticks, black bears

The Thunder Swamp Trail is a 31.7-mile (51.0 km) hiking trail system in Delaware State Forest in the Pocono Mountains region of northeastern Pennsylvania. The 18.3 mile main loop includes a junction with the one-way northeast spur that leads to Stillwater Natural Area; the spur adds 13.4 miles if hiked in both directions.

== History and route ==
The Thunder Swamp Trail was constructed by the Youth Conservation Corps during the 1970s to visit numerous swamps and other features of interest in Delaware State Forest. While there are many named swamps in the area, there was no actual "Thunder Swamp" and the workers coined the name for fun. The trail features relatively little elevation gain, but the surface is challenging due to wet, uneven, and rocky terrain.

The main loop of the Thunder Swamp Trail can be reached at a trailhead with a large parking area on Pennsylvania Route 402 in southern Pike County. The northeast spur can be reached from a trailhead on Bushkill Falls Road. Those two trails are marked with orange blazes as designated Pennsylvania State Forest hiking trails.

=== Main loop ===
From the trailhead on PA Route 402, the hiker can complete the main loop clockwise by heading initially to the west. The trail reaches the large Ben Hanna Swamp at 1.0 mile, and then at 2.4 miles walks alongside Bushkill Creek for a short distance. The trail then turns north; at 4.2 miles it crosses the paved Snow Hill Road near a parking lot and secondary trailhead. In this area, the trail passes a junction with a side trail that leads to Pennel Run Natural Area. The trail walks alongside a large unnamed swamp at 6.0 miles and trends to the northeast. The trail crosses PA Route 402 again at 9.5 miles, near the village of Ludleyville, then crosses an old stone dam over Saw Creek at 10.4 miles. The hiker reaches a junction with the northeast spur (see below) at 11.1 miles, at which point the main loop turns to the south.

From 14.1 to 15.6 miles, the trail walks along the unpaved Red Rock Run Road then the unpaved Luke Road. After departing from Luke Road, the trail turns southwest and walks alongside Red Rock Run for a significant distance, passing a large slide waterfall at 16.8 miles. The trail crosses Saw Creek again at 17.0 miles, using a long footbridge built by volunteers in 1986. Now heading west, the trail reaches the trailhead on PA Route 402 again at 18.3 miles, ending the loop.

=== Northeast spur ===
From the 11.1 mile point on the main loop, the northeast spur departs to the east and crosses the paved Bushkill Falls Road at 0.5 mile, near a large parking lot and trailhead. The trail reaches Painter Swamp at 2.6 miles and enters Stillwater Natural Area at 3.7 miles. The trail crosses Little Bushkill Creek via a long footbridge at 4.3 miles, then reaches a junction with a mini-loop at 4.9 miles. For the next 3.6 miles, the mini-loop encircles, but does not encounter, the extensive Big Bear Swamp which displays evidence of glacial patterns and relatively rare flora and fauna. At the end of the mini-loop, the hiker returns to the main stem of the northeast spur at 8.4 miles. For many hikers, completing the hike requires repeating the main stem of the northeast spur westbound for 4.9 miles, returning to the junction with the main loop of the Thunder Swamp Trail after 13.4 miles.
