= Promised Land State Park =

State park in Pennsylvania, United States

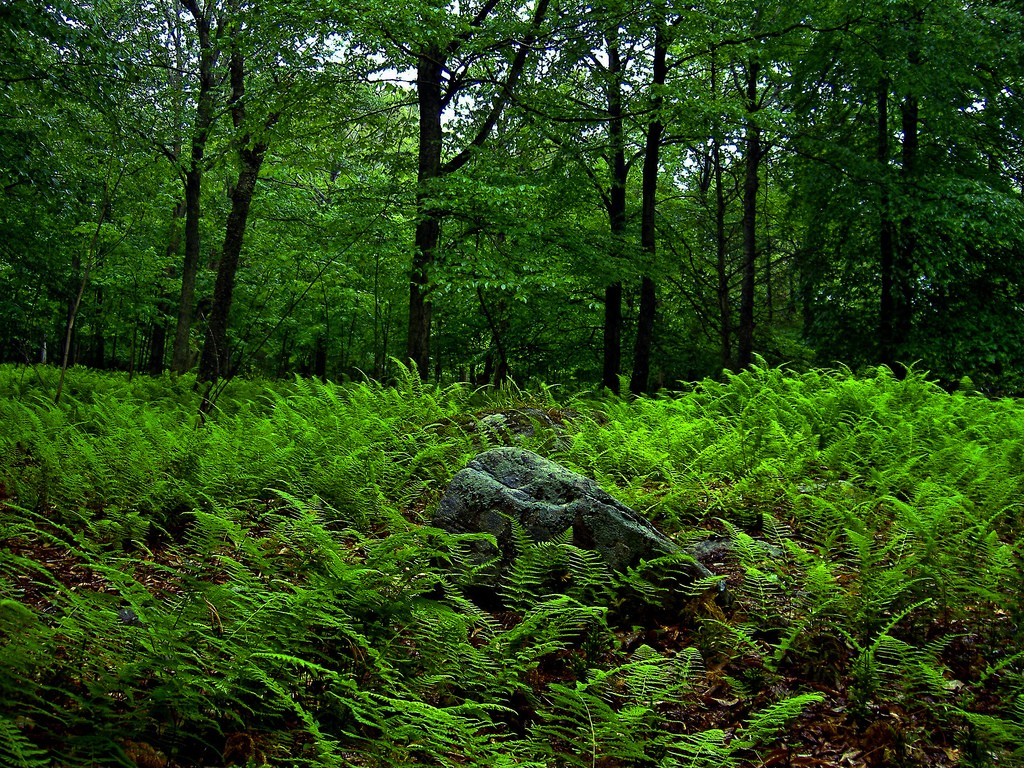

- Location within Pennsylvania Location within the United States
- Interactive map of Promised Land State Park
- Location: Pike County, Pennsylvania, United States
- Coordinates: 41°17′58″N 75°12′51″W
- Area: 2,971 acres (1,202 ha)
- Elevation: 1,745 feet (532 m)
- Established: 1905
- Administrator: Pennsylvania Department of Conservation and Natural Resources
- Named for: A so called Promised Land that the earliest settlers were told they would find
- Website: Official website
- Pennsylvania State Parks

Promised Land State Park is a Pennsylvania state park in Blooming Grove, Greene and Palmyra Townships, Pike County, Pennsylvania, in the United States. The approximately 3,000-acre (1,214 ha) park is mostly surrounded by Delaware State Forest. It is in the Poconos and sits at an elevation of 1,800 feet (549 m). The second growth forests in Promised Land State Park are made up of beech, maple, oak and hemlock trees. There are two lakes within the boundaries of the park. Promised Land State Park is 10 miles (16 km) north of Canadensis on Pennsylvania Route 390.

Promised Land State Park was chosen by the Pennsylvania Department of Conservation and Natural Resources (DCNR) and its Bureau of State Parks as one of "25 Must-See Pennsylvania State Parks".

== History ==
Promised Land State Park was once the hunting grounds of the Lenape Indian tribe. Their land was part of the Province of Pennsylvania, established by King Charles II of England and under the leadership of William Penn. William Penn founded Pennsylvania as a colony where religious freedom was foundation of its establishment. The Shakers, a religious sect, from England migrated to the Thirteen Colonies and purchased some of the land in the Promised Land State Park area. It appears that they chose not to settle and instead sold off the land to lumbering operations that clear cut the land and sent the timber to the ship building docks in Philadelphia. The process of clear cutting the forests repeated itself several times until the land was acquired by the Commonwealth of Pennsylvania in 1902. The forestry department worked to re-establish the forests of the area. Promised Land State Park was opened to the public in 1905, becoming just the fourth state park in all of Pennsylvania.

The spillway of a dam at Promised Land State Park.

Many of the park facilities in use today were constructed during the Great Depression of the 1930s by the young men of the Civilian Conservation Corps. The CCC was established by President Franklin D. Roosevelt to relieve the widespread unemployment that was brought about by the Depression. In exchange for a paycheck, food, and shelter, the men of the CCC worked to reclaim the forests. They built the roads and trails that cross the state forests. They also fought wild fires, planted trees, and built bridges on state roads.

Whittaker Lodge and the Bear Wallow Cabins were listed on the National Register of Historic Places in 1986 and 1987 for their architectural qualities and for their historical role in the park.

== Natural history ==
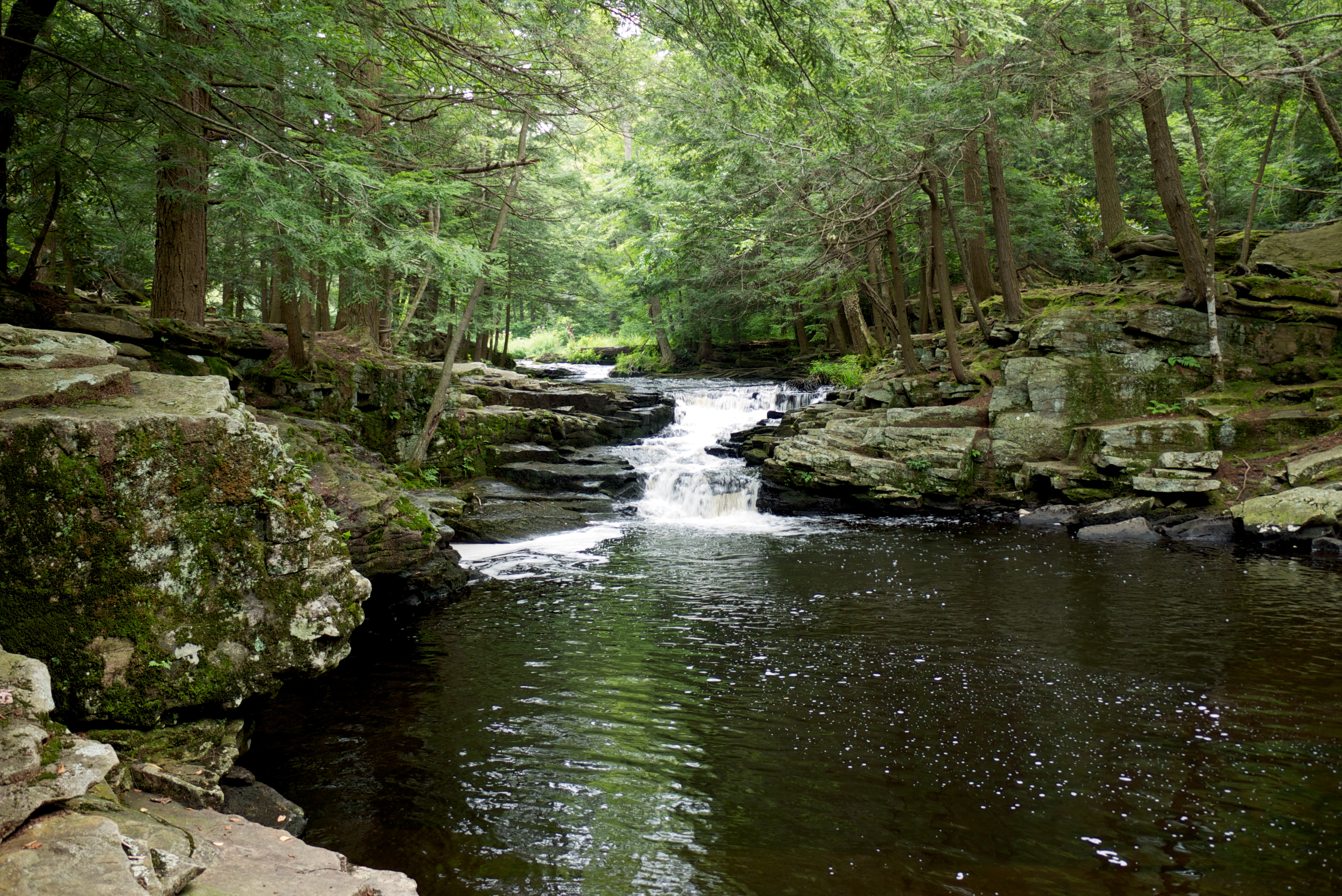
Small waterfall in Promised Land State Park.

Since the forests have been allowed to regrow at Promised Land State Park it has become a center of diverse wildlife and ecosystems. The land on which it sits has largely very rocky and shallow soil with nutrient-poor bogs and dark evergreen forests. The poor quality of the soil and the bogs are a remnant of the vast glaciers that covered Pennsylvania during the last ice age. As the glaciers receded they scraped the earth and left a glacial till at the surface above the bedrock. This rocky soil drains poorly thereby creating the bogs that are spread throughout the park. The evergreen trees attract a variety of birds including, the red breasted nuthatch, Blackburnian warbler and northern waterthrush. Salamanders and wood frogs are drawn to the bogs to breed during the springtime.

While not all of the trees within the park are evergreen, many were before the lumber era. Some deciduous trees have grown at Promised Land State Park. These trees attract a different set of birds including the American redstart, Louisiana waterthrush and red-eyed vireo.

The National Audubon Society has designated Promised Land State Park as an Important Bird Area. The designated area includes the park and adjacent Bruce Lake Natural Area. According to the Pennsylvania Game Commission, approximately 200 bird species have been documented across the combined area, including 129 species recorded as breeding or nesting.

American black bears are a common sight at Promised Land State Park. They are attracted to the wide variety of plants, grasses and berries that are common in the park. Visitors to the park are cautioned to be extremely careful when encountering a black bear. Bears are generally shy and will avoid human contact, but bears that have been fed by and have been accustomed to human contact can become dangerous. They are very fast, as fast as a thoroughbred, strong and nimble. Bears also have a strong sense of smell. For this reason all visitors are asked to firmly secure all food products brought into the park and never to leave them out in the open overnight.

In addition to the bears, Promised Land State Park is also home to variety of other large woodland creatures. White tailed deer are a common sight in the park. Early morning visitors may come across groups of feeding wild turkeys. A wildlife observation deck is located on Lower Lake, from here visitors may see a variety of waterfowl species and even some bald eagles that have nested in the area within the last few years. Visitors are asked to not feed the wildlife. Feeding raccoons, squirrels and chipmunks may expose visitors to rabies. The feeding of Canada geese in the swimming area is discouraged due to the increased quantities of odorus fecal matter.

== Recreation ==
Promised Land State Park is open year-round for recreational opportunities that include hiking, birding, fishing, swimming, boating, horseback riding, trail biking, camping, and ice skating.

Promised Land Lake and Lower Lake are both popular fishing and ice fishing destinations. The common game fish are smallmouth and largemouth bass, catfish, crappie, pickerel, muskellunge, and yellow perch. Lower Lake is stocked by the Pennsylvania Fish and Boat Commission with brook, rainbow and brown trout. All anglers are expected to follow the rules and regulations of the Pennsylvania Fish and Boat Commission.

Hunting is permitted at Promised Land State Park. Hunters are expected to follow the rules and regulations of the Pennsylvania Game Commission. The common game species are turkey, white-tailed deer, and black bear. The hunting of groundhogs is prohibited.

There are 50 miles (80 km) of trails at Promised Land State Park and the nearby state forests that are open to hiking and in some locations, horseback riding, cross-country skiing, snowmobiling, and mountain biking. The trails pass through a variety of habitats and give visitors an opportunity to observe a diverse wildlife population.

Gas powered boats are prohibited on the lakes of Promised Land State Park. Electric powered and non powered boats must have a current registration with any state or a launch permit from the Pennsylvania Fish and Boat Commission. A concession is open on the shores of the lakes for renting canoes, kayaks and paddle boats.

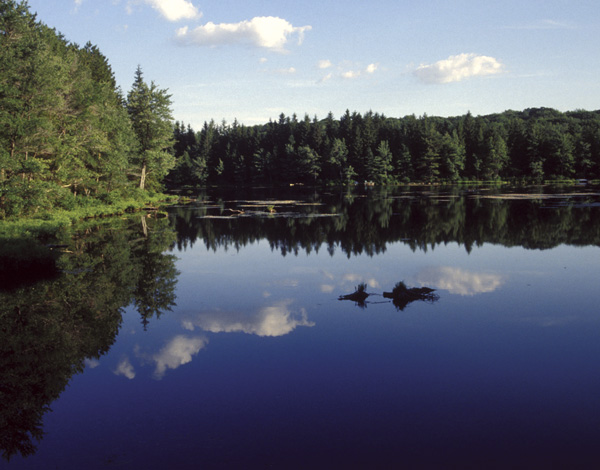
A view of the lake at Promised Land State Park

Promised Land State Park has a centrally located picnic and beach area that is near Promised Land Lake in a woodland setting. The facilities include a sandy beach, boat launch, parking area, fresh water, picnic tables, reservable pavilions, garbage disposal containers, charcoal grills, a concession stand, a boat rental, a sand volleyball court, and restrooms with pay showers.

== Staying overnight ==
Visitors to Promised Land State Park who wish to stay overnight have a choice of staying in one of four campgrounds or in rustic cabins that were built during the Great Depression by the Civilian Conservation Corps.

- Lower Lake Campground is on Lower Lake. It opens for the season in mid-April and closes in mid-December. The campground has flush toilets and showers with hot water.
- Deerfield Campground is set back in a rocky forest. It is open Memorial Day weekend through Labor Day weekend. It does have flush toilets, but the nearest pay showers are in the picnic area. Deerfield campground is over 95 years old. During 2010 renovations, each campsite received a new table, fire ring and lantern holder. Also, some of the ground was leveled for easier access.
- Pickerel Point Campground is on a peninsula on the southern end of Promised Land Lake. There are walk-in campsites situated at various points along the shore. It was renovated and re-opened on June 29, 2012. It has modern camping facilities, including bathhouses with green technology and the first sites with sewer hookup in all the state parks in Pennsylvania.
- The Pines Campground is open Memorial Day through Labor Day. It is on the northwestern shore of Promised Land Lake. The campground does have flush toilets, but no showers. There are pay showers nearby in the picnic area.
- Bear Wallow Cabins Colony is a group of 12 rustic cabins that were built and used by the CCC during the 1930s. Each cabin has a fireplace, refrigerator, modern shower and toilet outbuilding, beds and electricity.

== Masker Museum ==
The park's Masker Museum features exhibits about the Civilian Conservation Corps (CCC) and its work in the park. CCC exhibits include a barracks of beds, interactive stories, displays and artifacts. The museum also features natural history exhibits about the park's animals, plants and ecosystems. There are activities for children, a bird observation area of the outdoor feeding stations, and a native plant garden.

The museum located off of Pickerel Point Road by the amphitheater and Pickerel Point Campground. Admission is free.
