= 2014 Pennsylvania State Police barracks attack =

2014 shooting in Pennsylvania, U.S.

Coordinates: 41.3867°N 75.1308°W

- Location: Blooming Grove, Pike County, Pennsylvania, U.S.
- Date: September 12, 2014; 10:50 P.M. EDT (22:50 UTC−04:00)
- Target: Pennsylvania State Troopers
- Attack type: Murder by shooting, domestic terrorism
- Weapon: .308-caliber Norinco NDM-86 rifle
- Deaths: 1 (Cpl. Bryon Dickson)
- Injuries: 1 (Tpr. Alex Douglass)
- Perpetrator: Eric Matthew Frein
- Motive: Attempting to start a revolution
- Verdict: Guilty on all counts
- Convictions: First-degree murder; First-degree criminal homicide of a law enforcement officer; Criminal attempt to commit first-degree murder; Criminal attempt to commit homicide of a law enforcement officer; First-degree assault of a law enforcement officer; Terrorism; Weapons of mass destruction; Discharge of a firearm into an occupied structure; Possessing instruments of crime; Recklessly endangering another person
- Sentence: Death

On September 12, 2014, during a shift change at the Pennsylvania State Police barracks in Blooming Grove Township, two state troopers were shot with a .308 caliber rifle. One trooper died at the scene and another was taken to a hospital where he recovered. Eric Frein was identified by the police as the only suspect in the case, and led the police on a weeks-long manhunt. He was eventually captured at an abandoned airport hangar on October 30, and charged with terrorism, murder, and attempted murder. Frein was convicted of all charges in April 2017, and subsequently sentenced to death.

== Attack ==
At 10:50 P.M. on September 12, 2014, a shift change was commencing outside the Troop R barracks of the Pennsylvania State Police in the Pocono Mountains in Blooming Grove Township, Pennsylvania. At that moment, a sniper opened fire with a .308-caliber rifle. One trooper was killed by the gunfire and a second was injured, but survived.

Four shots were fired within 90 seconds, from a distance of 82 yards (75 m) in a position at the edge of the nearby woods, before the shooter fled further into the wooded area. One trooper was shot trying to help the other, prompting him to crawl back to safety, where he was aided by two other troopers.

The deceased victim was shot twice, once in the chest, and once in the shoulder, both fatal wounds. The wounded victim was shot once in the lower back, which exited through the hip, causing nerve damage to his right leg.

=== Victims ===
- Corporal Bryon K. Dickson II, 38, a seven-year veteran (killed)
- Trooper Alex Douglass, 31, a ten-year veteran (injured)

== Perpetrator ==
Eric Matthew Frein was identified as the main suspect of the attack after the discovery of an abandoned 2001 Jeep Cherokee three days after the event. The vehicle was traced back to his parents, and multiple pieces of evidence, including bullet casings matched to the attack, were discovered inside. He led authorities on a manhunt after the shootings, eventually being placed on the FBI Ten Most Wanted Fugitives list.

Frein was described by police as a "self-taught survivalist" with a grudge against law enforcement personnel. At the time of the attack, he was a reenactor who acted in a variety of roles, most often Serbian soldiers. In 2008, Frein founded Istocni Vuk or "Eastern Wolf", whose Myspace page pictured Frein engaged in recreational military simulations as a Serbian soldier.

The police manhunt, initially involving nearly 200 officers by September 17, grew to nearly 1,000 on September 24. Law enforcement officers included local police; state police forces from Pennsylvania, New York, and New Jersey; Federal Bureau of Investigation; U.S. Marshals Service; and the Bureau of Alcohol, Tobacco, Firearms and Explosives. Frein was seen several times during the manhunt, but each time, officers were unable to approach him directly due to the rugged terrain of the area, which allowed Frein to escape. They subsequently believed Frein was taunting them during the manhunt. A colleague from the MilSim group "Red Alliance" suggested that "If he's re-enacting anyone, it's Rambo from the very first movie," referring to the character of John Rambo in First Blood.

Frein was captured by U.S. Marshals near Birchwood-Pocono Airpark, an abandoned airfield approximately 3 miles (4.8 km) ENE of Tannersville, on October 30, 48 days after the shooting. At the time of his arrest, he was unarmed, but a Yugo M24/47 8mm bolt-action rifle, a .308-caliber Norinco NDM-86 rifle, a 9x18mm CZ 82 semi-automatic pistol and a bayonet were recovered afterward. He was arrested without incident and restrained using handcuffs belonging to Dickson. The day after his capture, he was charged with first-degree murder and attempted murder in the attack.

Although Frein did not resist arrest, he suffered a cut to the bridge of his nose, as well as a scrape over his left eye and bruises to his cheeks and eyes. The U.S. Marshals claim this occurred while he was lying on the ground during his arrest. The Pennsylvania State Police, however, claim these injuries occurred while he was on the run.

== Aftermath ==
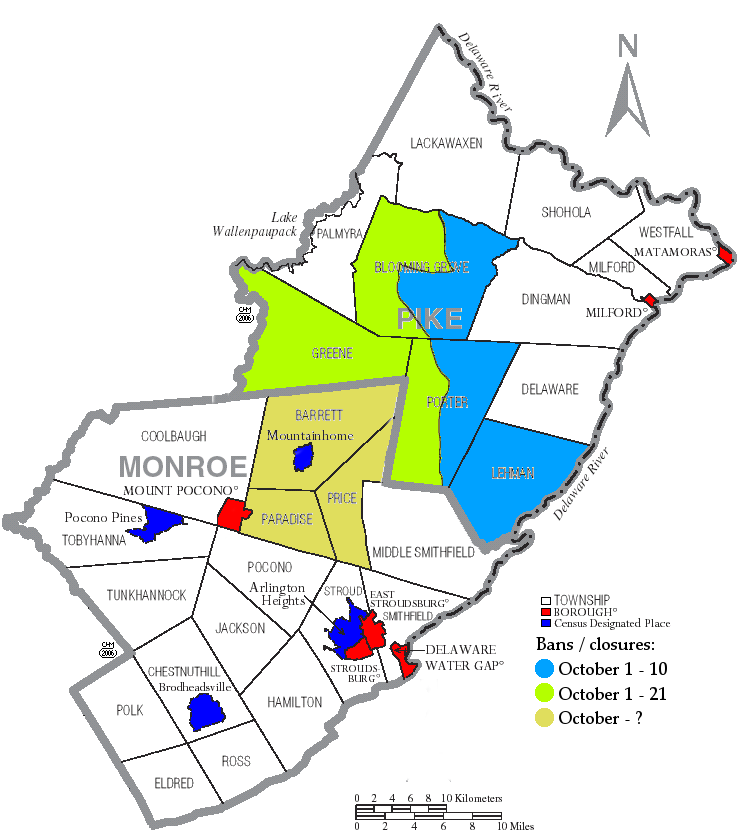
On October 1, following discovery of two pipe bombs, all hunting and trapping on public or private land and all access to state gameland was forbidden in the shaded areas. The blue-shaded area was reopened on October 10. The green-shaded area was reopened October 21, after two sightings of Frein in Paradise Township, while the yellow remained under the hunting/trapping ban and gameland closures.

After the attack, the Troop R barracks were immediately closed down for crime scene investigators to process it, and for repairs to windows shattered by gunfire. Trooper operations were temporarily handled at the barracks in Honesdale, about 20 miles (32 km) away. On November 12, 2014, two months after the attack, the barracks were reopened, with all but three employees (Alex Douglass and two others) returning to work.

Frein was indicted on a total of twelve charges, including terrorism and first-degree murder. He pleaded not guilty to all charges during his video arraignment on January 29, 2015. Prosecutors sought the death penalty.

Douglass, who suffered a gunshot wound to the pelvis, was taken to Geisinger Medical Center for treatment and was classified to be in stable but critical condition. Partially paralyzed by his injuries, he underwent sixteen surgeries at a New York City hospital in an effort to walk on his own again. In May 2015, his family announced that they forgave Frein for the shooting. Also in May 2015, Douglass shared his experience of being shot. In 2018 his right leg was amputated because of medical complications.

On April 19, 2017, Frein was convicted on all 12 counts, including first-degree murder. On April 27, 2017, Frein was sentenced to death by lethal injection and sent to Pennsylvania's death row.

== Reactions ==
Governor Tom Corbett released a statement after the attack, saying, "Every attack on an officer of the law is an attack on our state, our country and civilized society." He also ordered all state flags at the Pennsylvania State Capitol and commonwealth facilities to be flown at half-staff.

State Police Commissioner Frank Noonan called the attack "cowardly" and said, "It cuts us to the core that such an event could happen."

US Congressman Tom Marino (R–10th) expressed his condolences to the victims and their families, and also condemned the attack, supporting the officers in their manhunt for the shooter.
