= Bruce Lake Natural Area =

Natural area in Pennsylvania

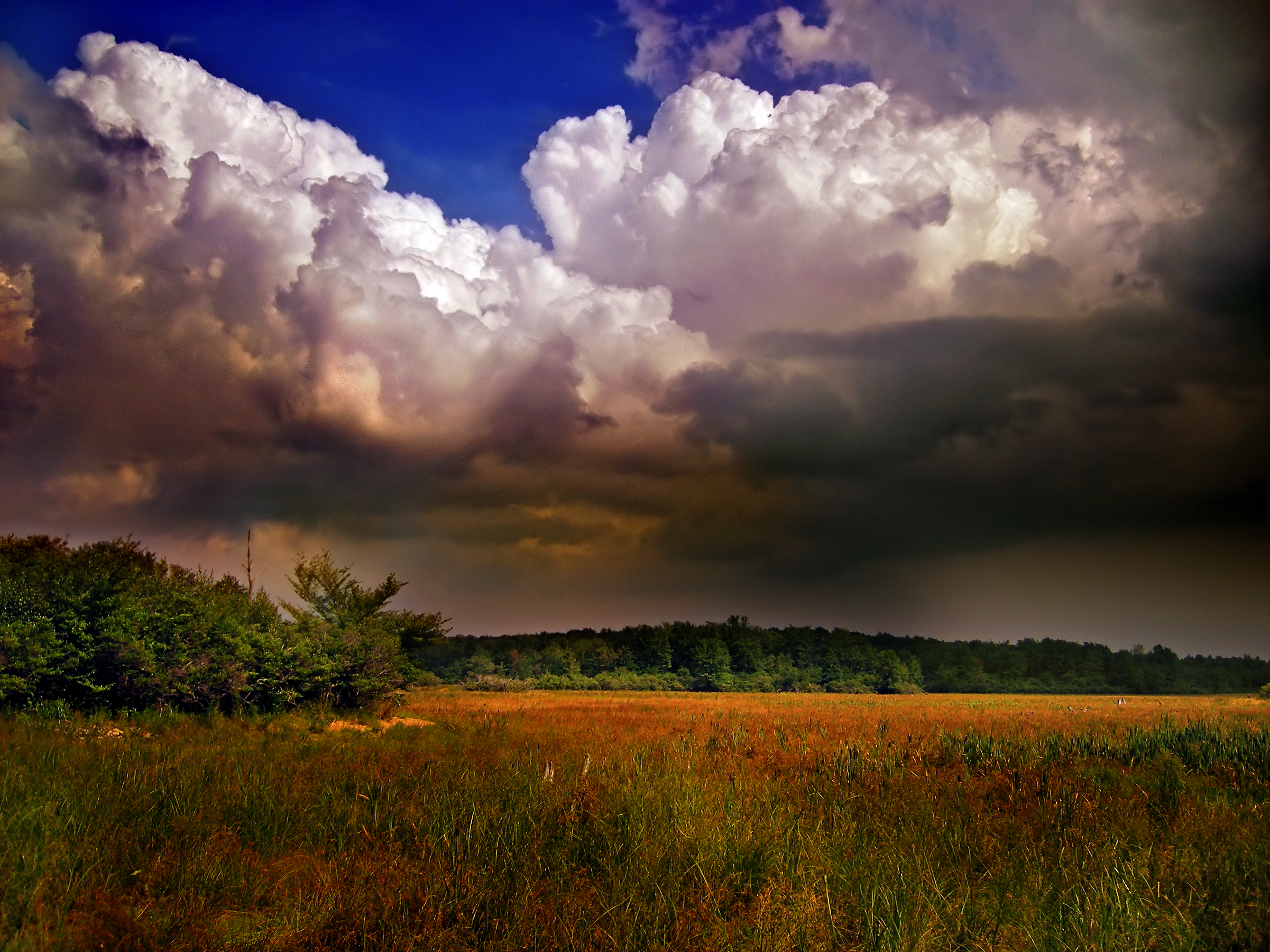
- Storm clouds over Bruce Lake Natural Area

- Location within Pennsylvania
- Location: Pike County, Pennsylvania
- Nearest town: Blooming Grove
- Coordinates: 41°20′29″N 75°12′27″W
- Area: 2,845 acres (1,151 ha)

Bruce Lake Natural Area is a 2,845-acre (1,151 ha) protected area in Pike County, Pennsylvania, United States. It is part of Delaware State Forest.

== Description ==
The Natural Area was established to protect a glacial bog of a type that is relatively rare in Pennsylvania, and is more likely to be seen in New England and Canada. Several species of equally uncommon plants and flowers can also be found. Animals like beavers and blue herons can be seen in the area.

The area includes Bruce Lake and Egypt Meadow Lake. The first is a natural spring-fed lake that was originally formed by glaciers during the last ice age, and has been named by journalists as one of the most beautiful lakes in Pennsylvania; the latter was constructed by the U.S. Army Corps of Engineers in 1936. The area has no active roads and is traversed by several hiking trails.
