= Pennel Run Natural Area =

Natural area in Pennsylvania

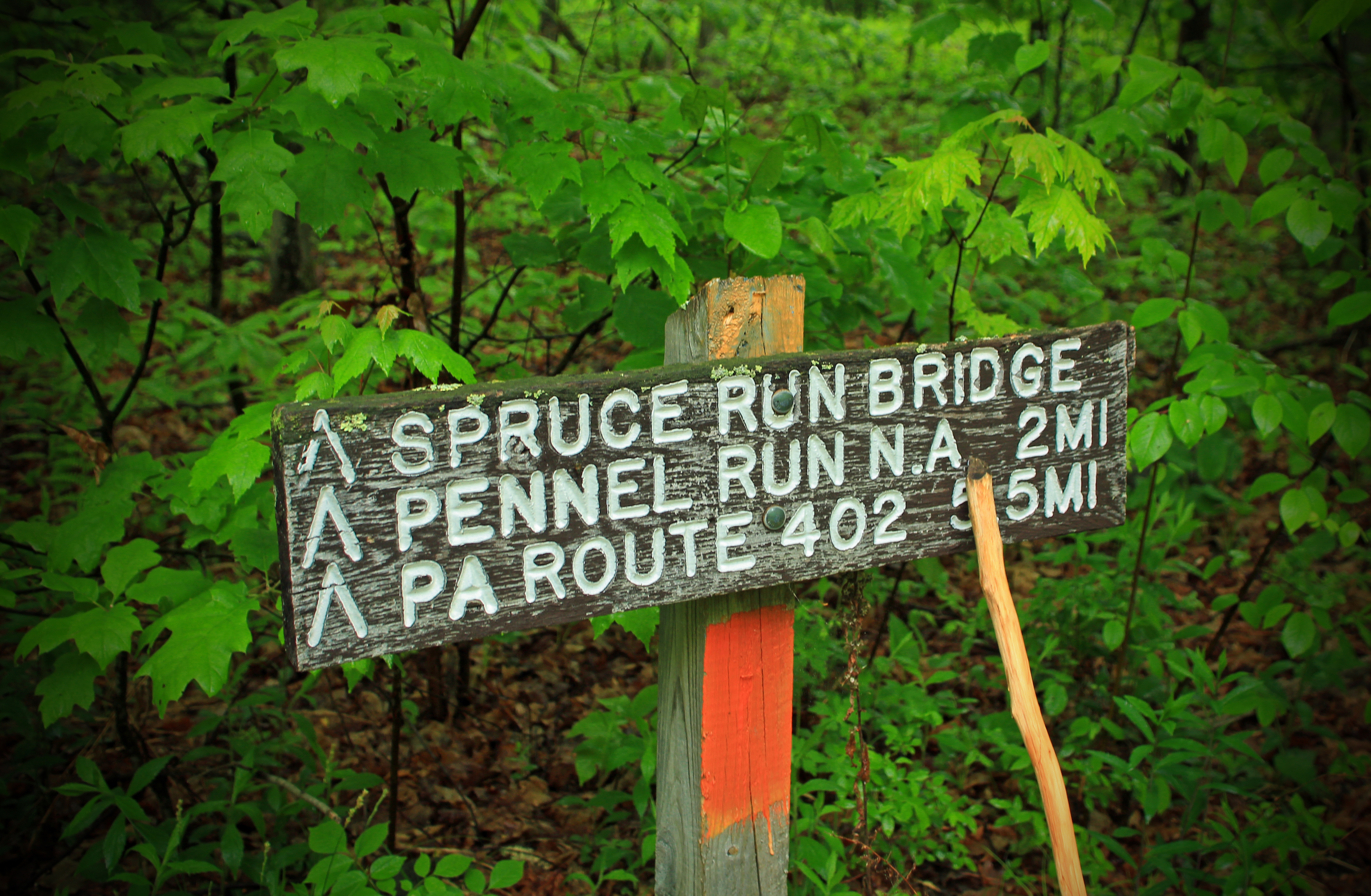
- A sign on the Thunder Swamp Trail directing hikers to Pennel Run Natural Area

- Location within Pennsylvania
- Location: Pike County, Pennsylvania
- Nearest town: Canadensis
- Coordinates: 41°10′45″N 75°08′09″W
- Area: 936 acres (379 ha)

Pennel Run Natural Area is a 936-acre (379 ha) protected area in Pike County, Pennsylvania, United States. It is part of Delaware State Forest.

== Description ==
The Natural Area was established to protect several tree species from logging, and it includes Utts Swamp where reptiles and amphibians are protected. Some trees had been spared from logging in recent decades due to an unclear boundary between competing logging company claims. Some such trees have been designated as old growth, which is very rare in northeastern Pennsylvania.

The long-distance Thunder Swamp Trail passes nearby, and a side trail leads to the Natural Area. The area suffered a forest fire in the late 2010s that destroyed many trails. After the ecosystem recovered, Pennsylvania forestry trails began a program to build a new loop trail through the area in 2025.
