= List of Pennsylvania state historical markers in Pike County =

Location of Pike County in Pennsylvania

This is a list of the Pennsylvania state historical markers in Pike County.

This is intended to be a complete list of the official state historical markers placed in Pike County, Pennsylvania by the Pennsylvania Historical and Museum Commission (PHMC). The locations of the historical markers, as well as the latitude and longitude coordinates as provided by the PHMC's database, are included below when available. There are 19 historical markers located in Pike County.

== Historical markers ==
Marker title	Image	Date dedicated	Location	Marker type	Topics
Battle of Minisink		June 1, 1948	Lackawaxen Scenic Dr. (old PA 590) @ PA side of Minisink Ford & Roebling Bridge, N of Lackawaxen; 41.48196°N 74.98652°W	Roadside	American Revolution, Military, Native American
Charles S. Peirce		June 1, 1948	US 6 & 209, ~2 mi. NE of Milford; 41.34085°N 74.7657°W	Roadside	Medicine & Science, Professions & Vocations
Civil War Prison Train Wreck		September 1, 1993	PA 434 at Red Caboose, N end of Shohola; 41.47209°N 74.91725°W	Roadside	Civil War, Coal, Military, Railroads, Transportation
Dingmans Ferry		June 1, 1948	US 209, ~50 yds. N of Rt. 739 at Dingmans Ferry; 41.22375°N 74.87045°W	Roadside	Early Settlement, Transportation
Fort Hyndshaw		n/a	US 209 S of Bushkill at former LR 45068 (Missing)	Roadside	Forts, French & Indian War, Military
Gifford Pinchot		n/a	US6 at I-84 interchange, NW of Milford; 41.3393°N 74.83841°W	Roadside	Environment, Government & Politics 20th Century, Governors
Gifford Pinchot		June 1, 1948	U.S. 209 S of Milford; 41.31442°N 74.80068°W	Roadside	Environment, Government & Politics, Governors
Gifford Pinchot (1865-1946)		June 1, 1948	Just off US 6 (Owega Turnpike), near Pine Acres Rd., NW of Milford (follow signs to Grey Towers); 41.32809°N 74.81332°W	Roadside	Environment, Government & Politics, Governors
Hotel Fauchere		October 12, 2007	Broad & Catherine Sts., Milford; 41.32383°N 74.80119°W	Roadside	Buildings, Business & Industry, Inns & Taverns
Old Stone Fort		June 1, 1948	1st St., between Deevand Circle & Ave. P (several blocks S of US 6 & 209), Matamoras; 41.36793°N 74.69468°W	Roadside	Early Settlement, Ethnic & Immigration, Forts, Military, Native American
Pike County		September 17, 1981	County Courthouse, Broad & W High Sts., Milford; 41.32445°N 74.80071°W	City	Government & Politics, Government & Politics 19th Century
Sylvania Colony		June 1, 1948	Junction US 6 at PA 434, ~2 mi. S of Greeley; 41.40067°N 75.00959°W	Roadside	Cities & Towns, Environment, Government & Politics, Government & Politics 19th Century
Sylvania Colony		June 1, 1948	PA 434, ~100 yds. from PA 590 junction, Greeley; 41.41783°N 74.9951°W	Roadside	Cities & Towns, Environment, Government & Politics, Government & Politics 19th Century, Labor
Unity House		June 10, 2000	Bushkill Falls Road at Unity House entrance, Bushkill Falls (Missing)	Roadside	Buildings, Business & Industry, Government & Politics 20th Century, Labor
Wallenpaupack		August 13, 1948	Pa. 507 at Paupack (Missing)	Roadside	Early Settlement, Government & Politics, Government & Politics 18th Century
Wyoming-Minisink Path		October 3, 1949	U.S. 209, 3 miles S of Milford, ~75 yds S of Raymondskill Rd. 41.28669°N 74.83422°W	Roadside	Early Settlement, Native American, Paths & Trails, Transportation
Wyoming-Minisink Path		May 4, 1951	Blooming Grove Rd. (LR 51019 / SR 4004) @ Spring Rd., .3 mile W of Lords Valley	Roadside	Native American, Paths & Trails, Transportation
Wyoming-Minisink Path		November 22, 1950	PA 507 (E side), 1.4 mi. W of LR 51028 at Paupack (Missing)	Roadside	Paths & Trails, Transportation
Zane Grey (1872-1939)		October 28, 1989	At Zane Grey Museum, Scenic Dr., just off PA 590, N end of Lackawaxen; 41.48584°N 74.98719°W	City	Writers

== See also ==
- List of Pennsylvania state historical markers
- National Register of Historic Places listings in Pike County, Pennsylvania
