= Pine Lake Natural Area =

Natural area in Pennsylvania

- Location within Pennsylvania
- Location: Pike County, Pennsylvania
- Nearest town: Newfoundland
- Coordinates: 41°20′20″N 75°16′18″W
- Area: 67 acres (27 ha)

Pine Lake Natural Area is a 67-acre (27 ha) protected area in Pike County, Pennsylvania, United States. It is part of Delaware State Forest.

== Description ==
The Natural Area was established to protect a small glacial lake surrounded by a bog of a type uncommon in Pennsylvania. The area is known for colorful fall foliage thanks to a grove of tamarack trees, which are also relatively rare in Pennsylvania. Botanists have identified 38 herbs growing in the area, including several species or cranberries and sedges.
