= Eric Frein =

American murderer (born 1983)

Eric Matthew Frein
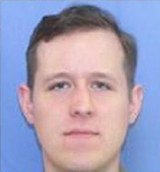
- Mugshot of Frein released by the FBI

FBI Ten Most Wanted Fugitive
- Reward: US$175,000 between FBI and PA government

Description
- Born: May 3, 1983 (age 43); New Jersey, U.S.
- Nationality: American
- Race: Caucasian
- Gender: Male
- Occupation: Cashier

Status
- Convictions: 9 charges, including first-degree murder (Note: First-degree murder; First-degree criminal homicide of a law enforcement officer; Criminal attempt to commit first-degree murder; Criminal attempt to commit homicide of a law enforcement officer; First-degree assault of a law enforcement officer; Terrorism; Weapons of mass destruction; Discharge of a firearm into an occupied structure; Possessing instruments of crime; Recklessly endangering another person)
- Penalty: Death (de jure)
- Status: On death row (Note: Capital punishment in Pennsylvania is suspended by Governor Josh Shapiro, but Frein is still technically awaiting execution on death row.)
- Added: September 18, 2014
- Caught: October 30, 2014
- Number: 503
- Captured

Eric Matthew Frein (born May 3, 1983) is an American murderer, convicted and sentenced to death for the 2014 Pennsylvania State Police barracks attack in which he shot and killed one state trooper and seriously injured another. A letter to his parents made it clear that he hoped to spark a revolution by his actions.

After being identified as a suspect three days after the shooting, Frein was the target of an extensive manhunt before being captured on the night of October 30, 2014, at an abandoned airport 48 days after the attack. He was convicted of the ambush in 2017 and sentenced to death.

== Early life and education ==
Eric Matthew Frein was born on May 3, 1983, in New Jersey. He attended Pocono Mountain High School in Pennsylvania, where he was a top scorer on the school's rifle team. Police described Frein as a "self-taught survivalist" with a grudge against law enforcement personnel. A report on Frein cited his friends saying that, as an Eagle Scout, he was repudiated by the chief executive officer of the Boy Scouts of America Minsi Trails Council at the time, where Frein had worked. Frein also worked at a Lewis' supermarket.

Frein attended East Stroudsburg University for one semester. He also attended Northampton Community College (the Bethlehem Township campus and the Monroe County campus) as a chemistry major.

== Criminal activity ==
In 2004, Frein was charged with burglary and grand larceny after he was accused of stealing items from vendors at a World War II reenactment in Odessa, New York. He failed to attend his trial and was arrested in Pennsylvania as a fugitive from justice. In lieu of $5,000 bail, Frein was held for 109 days in a county jail in New York on a felony charge before pleading guilty to a misdemeanor charge of possession of stolen property to be sentenced to time served and payment of $3,120 restitution.

In 2008, Frein founded Istočni Vuk (meaning "Eastern Wolf" in Serbo-Croatian) whose Myspace page pictured Frein engaged in recreational military simulations dressed in an Army of Republika Srpska uniform. Though he reenacted in a variety of roles, Frein preferred to portray Bosnian Serb soldiers. Fellow reenactors believed this was not based on ideology, but the way that the ragtag look of an ex-Yugoslav field jacket stood out from others. Pennsylvania State Police also believe that Frein made several trips to Southeast Europe. The Eastern Wolves were one of several groups competing in "tacticals" under the umbrella organization "Red Alliance", using replica airsoft rifles with plastic BBs. Frein was viewed as a serious reenactor with a deep knowledge of history; he was meticulous in many details, such as uniforms, but not overly obsessive in others—once even choosing a cheaper Chinese-made replica airsoft rifle over one made in Yugoslavia. Although he looked down on casual participants playing "cowboys and Indians", he was reported to have a sense of humor.

Frein's reenactment landed him several jobs in the film industry. He played a non-speaking role in Lustig, a 16-minute anti-Nazi film where he portrayed a German soldier at Auschwitz. In 2009, he gave technical direction in a World War I documentary being made by Jeremiah Hornbaker, who later offered him several other jobs that he turned down.

In July 2014, Frein told Hornbaker, friends, and parents that he was moving to Delaware to work at a chemical company. Police speculate that he might have taken this time to make the preparations that later would allow him to survive and evade capture.

At the time of the attack on the state troopers, Frein was living with his parents at their home in Canadensis in Barrett Township, Pennsylvania.

=== Attack and identification as a suspect ===
During a shift change late at night on September 12, 2014, outside the Trooper barracks of the Pennsylvania State Police in the Pocono Mountains in the Township of Blooming Grove, Pennsylvania, Frein opened fire with a .308-caliber rifle, killing Corporal Bryon K. Dickson II, a 38-year-old Pennsylvania State Police Trooper, and seriously wounding Trooper Alex Douglass.

Three days after the shootings, a man walking his dog found a suspicious looking 2001 Jeep Cherokee partially submerged in a retaining pond or drainage basin in a swamp near the intersection of Pennsylvania Route 402 and U.S. Route 6, approximately 2 miles (3.2 km) away from the crime scene. The vehicle was determined to belong to Frein's parents and evidence found in the vehicle included Frein's Social Security card, information about foreign embassies, camouflage paint, and bullet casings matched to the shooting. This led authorities to identify Frein as their only suspect. On September 16, 2014, a criminal complaint against Frein was docketed in the U.S. District Court in Scranton, Pennsylvania, and the court issued an arrest warrant the next day.

Authorities speculated that Frein, driving with his lights off on Pennsylvania Route 402, had failed to see a T-junction, lost control of the car, and drove into the swamp, and then may have traveled 15 to 20 miles (24 to 32 km) on foot to Canadensis, Pennsylvania, where his parents live.

=== Manhunt ===
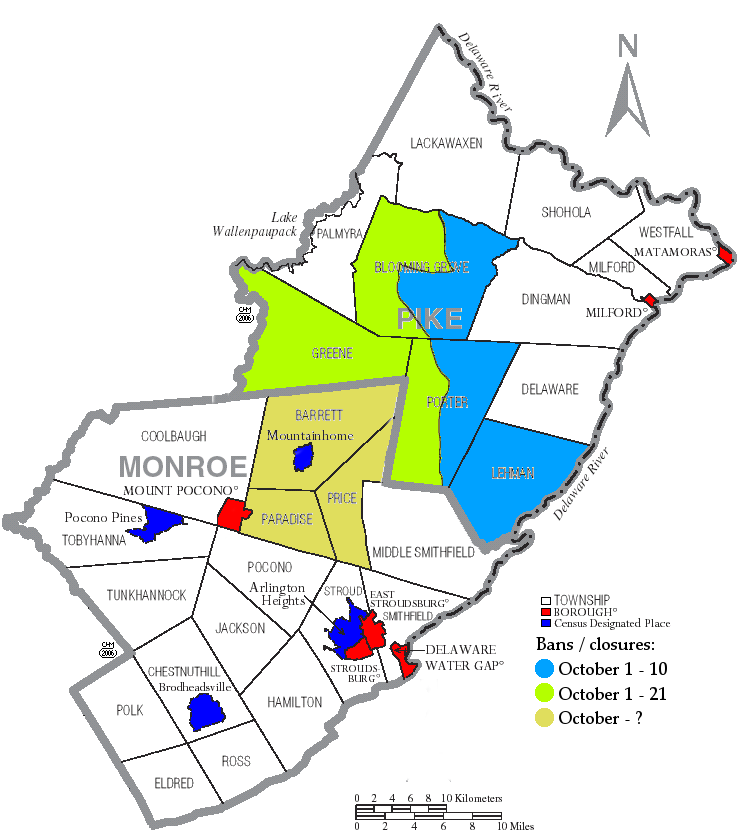
On October 1, following discovery of two pipe bombs, all hunting and trapping on public or private land and all access to state gameland was forbidden in the shaded areas. The blue-shaded area was reopened on October 10. The green-shaded area was reopened October 21, after two sightings of Frein in Paradise Township, while the yellow remained under the hunting/trapping ban and gameland closures.

The police manhunt grew from nearly 200 officers by September 17 to 400 officers by September 22 to nearly 1,000 on September 24. Law enforcement officers included local police, state police forces from Pennsylvania, New York, New Jersey and Connecticut as well as FBI, U.S. Marshals Service; and the Bureau of Alcohol, Tobacco, Firearms and Explosives. Though tracking dogs were regarded as a valuable tool, particularly on damp, calm days when scent dissipates most slowly, Frein successfully evaded them using "water crossings and terrain conditions."

Equipment included numerous police vehicles, particularly armored BearCats. The FBI displayed Frein's image and the number of a state police hotline using hundreds of digital billboards in Pennsylvania and five other states. The total cost of the manhunt came to $11.9 million.

Police believed they saw Frein several times during the manhunt, but each time were unable to approach directly due to the rugged terrain of the area, which allowed Frein to slip away. They believed Frein was taunting them, and Lt. Colonel George Bivens told reporters, "I almost think this is a game to him." A colleague from the MilSim group "Red Alliance" suggested that "If he's re-enacting anyone, it's Rambo from the very first movie," referring to the character of John Rambo in First Blood. The difficulty of capturing Frein was compared to that of finding other survivalist outdoorsmen such as Eric Rudolph, Jason McVean, and Robert William Fisher, whose special training helped them elude police for years. Pennsylvania State Troopers were not issued with "hard" body-armor during the early days of the search, causing concern over those searching and highlighting a concern for the safety of those in the manhunt.

Local resident James Tully, who bears some resemblance to Frein and who walks to work in the area, says he was stopped more than 20 times by officers searching for Frein. He claims one officer pointed a rifle at him and forced him to the ground, leaving him with bruised ribs and in fear that he would be shot.

=== Capture ===
Frein was captured by U.S. Marshals' Special Operations Group in an open field near an unused airport hangar at Birchwood-Pocono Airpark, an abandoned airfield approximately 3 miles (4.8 km) ENE of Tannersville, on October 30, 2014, 48 days after the shooting. At the time of his arrest, he was not armed, but a .308-caliber rifle and a pistol were recovered. Due to some confusion over which airport Frein was hiding at, some police officers erroneously searched for him at the Pocono Mountains Municipal Airport, which is about 10 miles from the Birchwood-Pocono Airpark and is still in use.

Frein was arrested without an altercation. Although he did not resist arrest, he suffered a cut to the bridge of his nose, as well as a scrape over his left eye and bruises to his cheeks and eyes. A Pennsylvania State Police spokesman said these injuries occurred while he was on the run, but the U.S. Marshals said this occurred while police had him down on the pavement during his arrest. According to Scott Malkowski, one of a dozen Marshals who took down Frein, standard procedure is "Never have a fugitive look at you", and because Frein went down in a position with head up looking at the officers, they pushed him to a face-down position, causing the scrapes in the process.

Symbolically, Frein was restrained after the arrest using the handcuffs of deceased officer Bryon Dickson and taken to the barracks where the attack occurred in the back seat of Dickson's car.

== Legal developments ==
The day after his capture, he was charged with first-degree murder and attempted murder in the shooting that killed Dickson and wounded Douglass. Frein was charged with murder of the first degree, criminal attempt to commit murder of the first degree, murder of a law enforcement officer of the first degree, criminal attempt to commit murder of a law enforcement officer of the first degree, assault of a law enforcement officer, two counts of terrorism under 18 Pa C.S.A. 2717(a)2 and 3, two counts of weapons of mass destruction under 18 Pa C.S.A. 2716(a), discharging a firearm into an occupied structure, possessing instruments of crime, and recklessly endangering another person. He pleaded not guilty to all charges during his video arraignment on January 29, 2015. Prosecutors said they intended to seek a death sentence.

Before Frein was tried, a Pike County judge had to determine if information about a State Police internal affairs investigation involving witnesses could be released to Frein's attorneys.

In June 2016, it was determined that Frein's trial would be heard by an imported jury from Chester County due to the extensive pretrial publicity in Pike County. This would be the first time that a Pike County case would be heard by a jury impaneled from another county since the 1980s. Also in June 2016, Pike County Judge Gregory Chelak denied a motion made by Frein's attorneys to bar prosecutors from seeking a death sentence in the case. Chelak rejected Frein's claim that capital punishment was unconstitutional.

In September 2017, Trooper Bryon Dickson's widow, Tiffany Dickson, filed a lawsuit against Frein's parents alleging they missed warning signs about their son's behavior and that Frein's father ”psychologically manipulated” him into adopting militantly anti-government and anti-police views.

=== Conviction and sentence ===
On April 19, 2017, Frein was found guilty on all charges and on April 26, the jury recommended a death sentence. The following day, Frein was formally sentenced to death by lethal injection. Frein is currently being held at SCI Somerset, a medium security prison in Pennsylvania.

== See also ==
- List of death row inmates in the United States
