= Westfall Township, Pennsylvania =

Township in Pennsylvania, US

Westfall Township
- Township
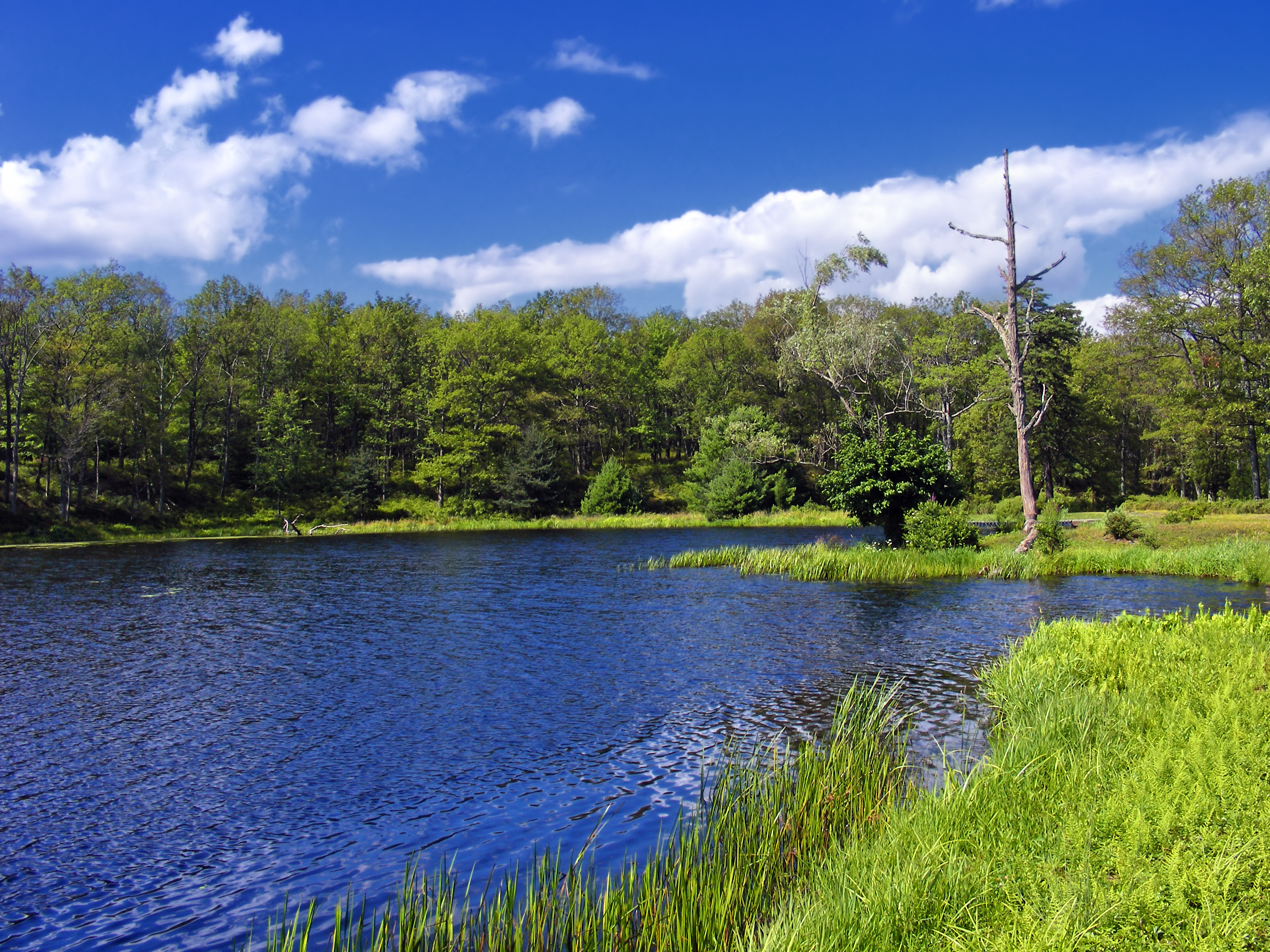
- Stairway Lake, Delaware State Forest, Westfall Township, Pike County in the Buckhorn Natural Area.

- Location in Pike County and the state of Pennsylvania.

- Location of Pennsylvania in the United States
- Coordinates: 41°25′00″N 74°45′59″W
- Country: United States
- State: Pennsylvania
- County: Pike

Area
  - Total: 29.46 sq mi (76.30 km^{2})
  - Land: 28.85 sq mi (74.71 km^{2})
  - Water: 0.62 sq mi (1.60 km^{2})
- Elevation: 961 ft (293 m)

Population (2010)
  - Total: 2,323
  - Estimate (2016): 2,268
  - Density: 78.6/sq mi (30.36/km^{2})
- Time zone: UTC-5 (EST)
  - Summer (DST): UTC-4 (EDT)
- Area code: 570
- FIPS code: 42-103-82928
- Website: westfalltownship.org

Westfall Township is a township in Pike County, Pennsylvania, United States. The population was 2,323 at the 2010 census.

== History ==
The Mill Rift Hall and Nearpass House are listed on the National Register of Historic Places.

In 2009 Westfall Township filed for Chapter 9 bankruptcy.

== Geography ==
According to the United States Census Bureau, the township has a total area of 29.4 square miles (76 km^{2}), of which 28.8 square miles (75 km^{2}) is land and 0.6 square miles (1.6 km^{2}) (2.04%) is water.

== Demographics ==
Historical population
Census	Pop.	Note	%±
1930	412		—
1940	407		−1.2%
1950	599		47.2%
1960	839		40.1%
1970	1,348		60.7%
1980	1,835		36.1%
1990	2,106		14.8%
2000	2,430		15.4%
2010	2,323		−4.4%
2020	2,537		9.2%
U.S. Decennial Census

As of the census of 2010, there were 2,323 people, 1,015 households, and 611 families residing in the township. The population density was 80.7 people per square mile (31.2 people/km^{2}). There were 1,202 housing units at an average density of 41.7 per square mile (16.1/km^{2}). The racial makeup of the township was 95.3% White, 1.2% African American, 0.6% Native American, 0.7% Asian, 0.5% from other races, and 1.7% from two or more races. Hispanic or Latino of any race were 5.3% of the population.

There were 1,015 households, out of which 21% had children under the age of 18 living with them, 48.1% were married couples living together, 7.6% had a female householder with no husband present, and 39.8% were non-families. 34.2% of all households were made up of individuals, and 21.1% had someone living alone who was 65 years of age or older. The average household size was 2.23 and the average family size was 2.86.

In the township the population was spread out, with 17.5% under the age of 18, 58% from 18 to 64, and 24.5% who were 65 years of age or older. The median age was 49.9 years.

The median income for a household in the township was $42,472, and the median income for a family was $51,065. Males had a median income of $39,844 versus $24,118 for females. The per capita income for the township was $20,866. About 4.9% of families and 6.9% of the population were below the poverty line, including 8.2% of those under age 18 and 7.6% of those age 65 or over.
