= Birchwood-Pocono Airpark =

Abandoned airport

Coordinates: 41°03′52″N 75°15′08″W

The Birchwood-Pocono Airpark is a former airport located in Tannersville, Pennsylvania, U.S., that operated alongside the Birchwood Resort from 1968 until its closure in 1996.

== History ==
The resort and airpark were originally owned by a Pan Am pilot and founder of Pocono Airlines, the late Walter E. ("Wally") Hoffman Jr. and his former wife Gail.

The location is identified by the United States Board on Geographic Names as the Birchwood-Pocono Airpark

The site is now derelict and the airstrip closed.

It is currently owned by the C. Castle Group, which at one time had ambitious plans for redevelopment that were not popular with some local residents, and which have since been modified.

In 2014, fugitive Eric Matthew Frein was captured near an abandoned hangar at the former facility after an extended manhunt.
