= Mill Rift Hall =

- U.S. National Register of Historic Places
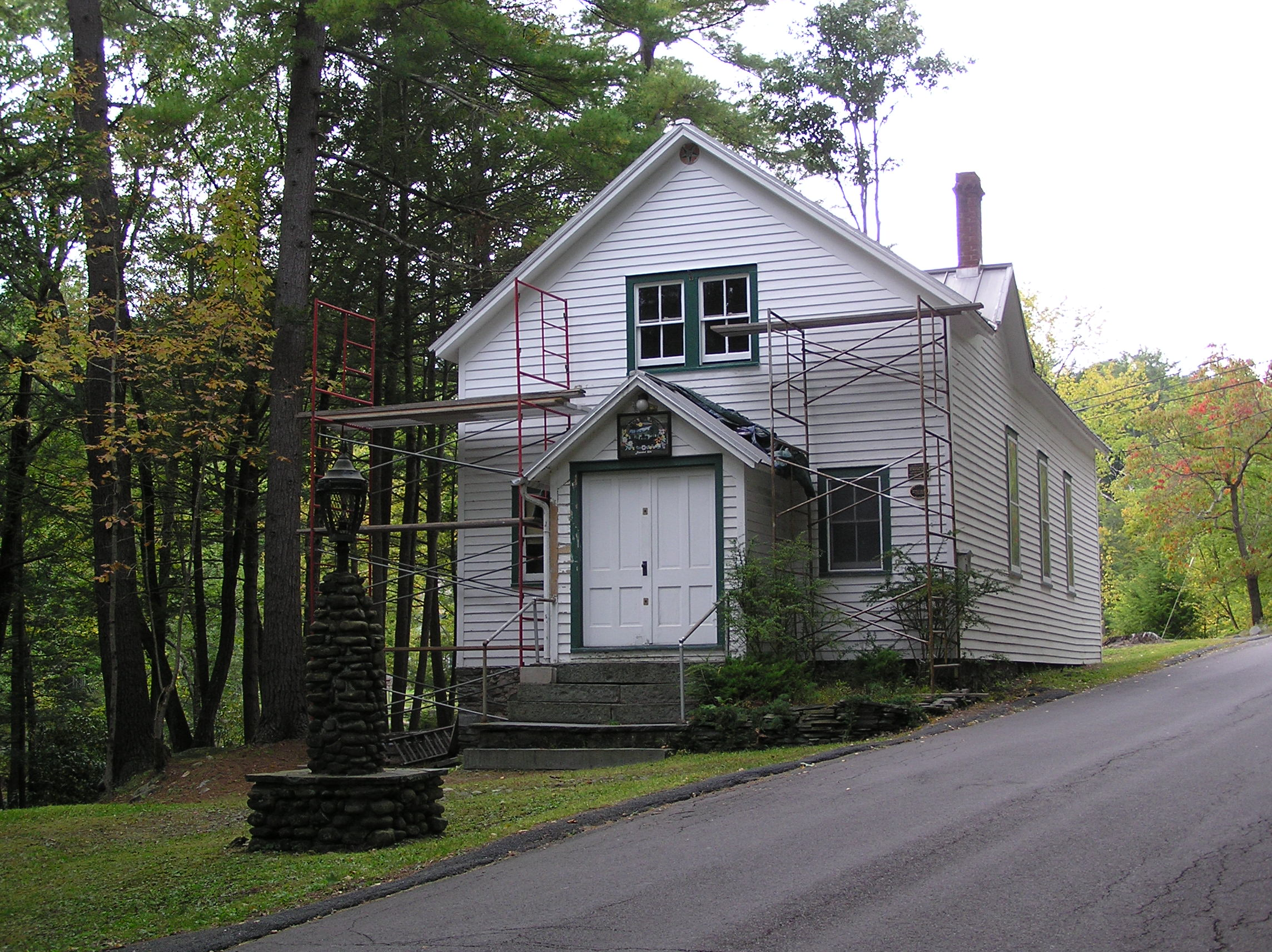

- Location within Pennsylvania Location within the United States
- Location: Bluestone Blvd., at Millrift in Westfall Township, Pennsylvania
- Coordinates: 41°24′42″N 74°44′45″W
- Area: less than one acre
- Built: 1905
- Built by: Sawyer, William
- MPS: Upper Delaware Valley, New York and Pennsylvania MPS
- NRHP reference No.: 93000714
- Added to NRHP: August 9, 1993

Mill Rift Hall is a historic community center located at Millrift in Westfall Township, Pennsylvania. It was built in 1905, and is a one-story, gable roofed wood frame, clapboard sided building on a bluestone foundation. The interior has an open plan and has an elevated stage and collection of local artifacts.

It was added to the National Register of Historic Places in 1993.
