= Little Mud Pond Swamp Natural Area =

Natural area in Pennsylvania

- Location within Pennsylvania
- Location: Pike County, Pennsylvania
- Nearest town: Lords Valley
- Coordinates: 41°23′32″N 75°02′26″W
- Area: 182 acres (74 ha)

Little Mud Pond Swamp Natural Area is a 182-acre (74 ha) protected area in Pike County, Pennsylvania, United States. It is part of Delaware State Forest.

== Description ==
The Natural Area was established to protect a glacial bog and boreal swamp of type that are uncommon in Pennsylvania and more likely to be found in Canada. Similarly uncommon plants including black spruce, tamarack, and pitcher plant can also be found in the area. The area includes a quaking bog that is unstable and challenging for hikers due to the underlying wetland ecosystem. The area has no established trails and can only be accessed via bushwhacking from nearby roads.
