= Lehman Township, Pike County, Pennsylvania =

Township in Pennsylvania, US

Lehman Township
- Township
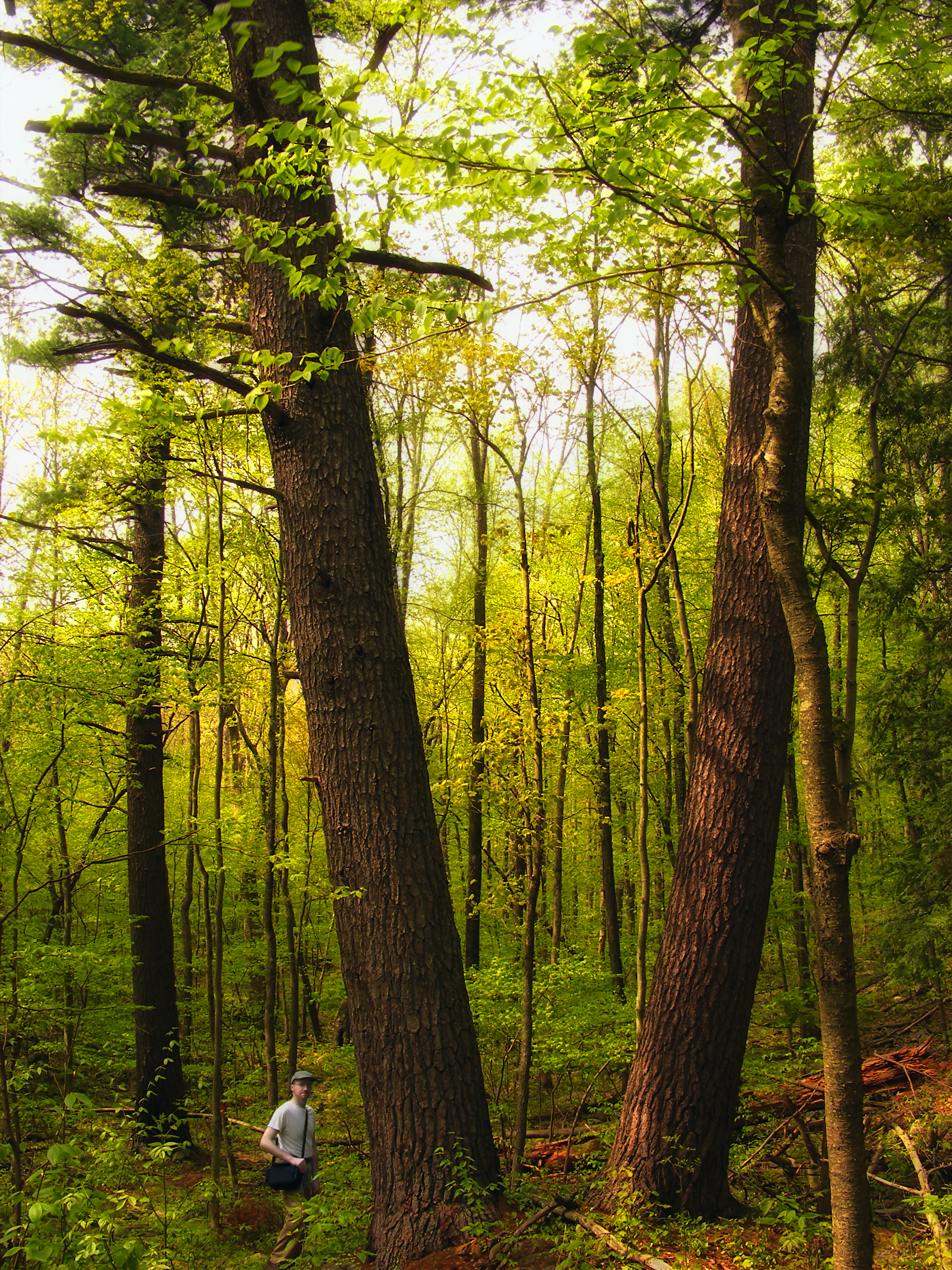
- Old-growth white pines, Delaware State Forest

- Location in Pike County and the state of Pennsylvania.

- Location of Pennsylvania in the United States
- Coordinates: 41°10′00″N 75°01′59″W
- Country: United States
- State: Pennsylvania
- County: Pike

Area
  - Total: 50.38 sq mi (130.48 km^{2})
  - Land: 48.94 sq mi (126.76 km^{2})
  - Water: 1.44 sq mi (3.72 km^{2})
- Elevation: 1,263 ft (385 m)

Population (2020)
  - Total: 10,843
  - Density: 221.5/sq mi (85.54/km^{2})
- Time zone: UTC-5 (EST)
  - Summer (DST): UTC-4 (EDT)
- Area code: 570
- FIPS code: 42-103-42512
- Website: www.lehmantownship.com

Lehman Township is a township in Pike County, Pennsylvania, United States. The population was 10,843 at the 2020 census.

== History ==
The Brodhead Farm, Nyce Farm, Peters House, and Turn Store and the Tinsmith's Shop are listed on the National Register of Historic Places.

== Communities ==
Lehman Township is home to several communities. The unincorporated community of Bushkill was a well-known small town in the region but has since fallen on hard times. Lehman Township is also home to Pine Ridge, Pocono Mountain Lake Estates, Pocono Ranch Lands and Saw Creek, four private communities. These private communities provide community and recreational services to residents. While these communities were initially mostly composed of vacation homes, many people have since moved there full-time including retirees and former vacationers.

== Geography ==
According to the United States Census Bureau, the township has a total area of 50.1 square miles (130 km^{2}), of which 48.9 square miles (127 km^{2}) is land and 1.2 square miles (3.1 km^{2}) (2.47%) is water. Many cornfields and forests accompany the land.

== Demographics ==
Historical population
Census	Pop.	Note	%±
2000	7,515		—
2010	10,663		41.9%
2020	10,843		1.7%

As of the census of 2010, there were 10,663 people, 3,620 households, and 2,787 families residing in the township. The population density was 218 inhabitants per square mile (84/km^{2}). There were 6,138 housing units at an average density of 125.5/sq mi. The racial makeup of the township was 66.27% White, 20.7% African American, 0.5% Native American, 2.1% Asian, 0.01% Pacific Islander, 6.6% from other races, and 3.9% from two or more races. Hispanic or Latino of any race were 22% of the population.

There were 3,620 households, out of which 38.0% had children under the age of 18 living with them, 58.0% were married couples living together, 13.4% had a female householder with no husband present, and 23.0% were non-families. 17.9% of all households were made up of individuals, and 5.5% had someone living alone who was 65 years of age or older. The average household size was 2.94 and the average family size was 3.35.

In the township the population was spread out, with 27.4% under the age of 18, 62.3% from 18 to 64, and 10.3% who were 65 years of age or older. The median age was 38.5 years.

The median income for a household in the township was $49,856, and the median income for a family was $50,714. Males had a median income of $40,940 versus $28,388 for females. The per capita income for the township was $19,933. About 5.6% of families and 7.9% of the population were below the poverty line, including 9.1% of those under age 18 and 4.6% of those age 65 or over.

== Media ==
WVPO at 96.7 is licensed to Lehman Township.

== Notable people ==
- Richard Brodhead, U.S. Senator from Pennsylvania (1851–1857)
- Henry Linderman, Director of the U.S. Mint (1867–1869; 1873–1878)
