= Minisink Archaeological Site =

Site in New Jersey and Pennsylvania, US

Coordinates: 41°05′36″N 74°59′32″W

- Minisink Archeological Site
- U.S. National Register of Historic Places
- U.S. National Historic Landmark
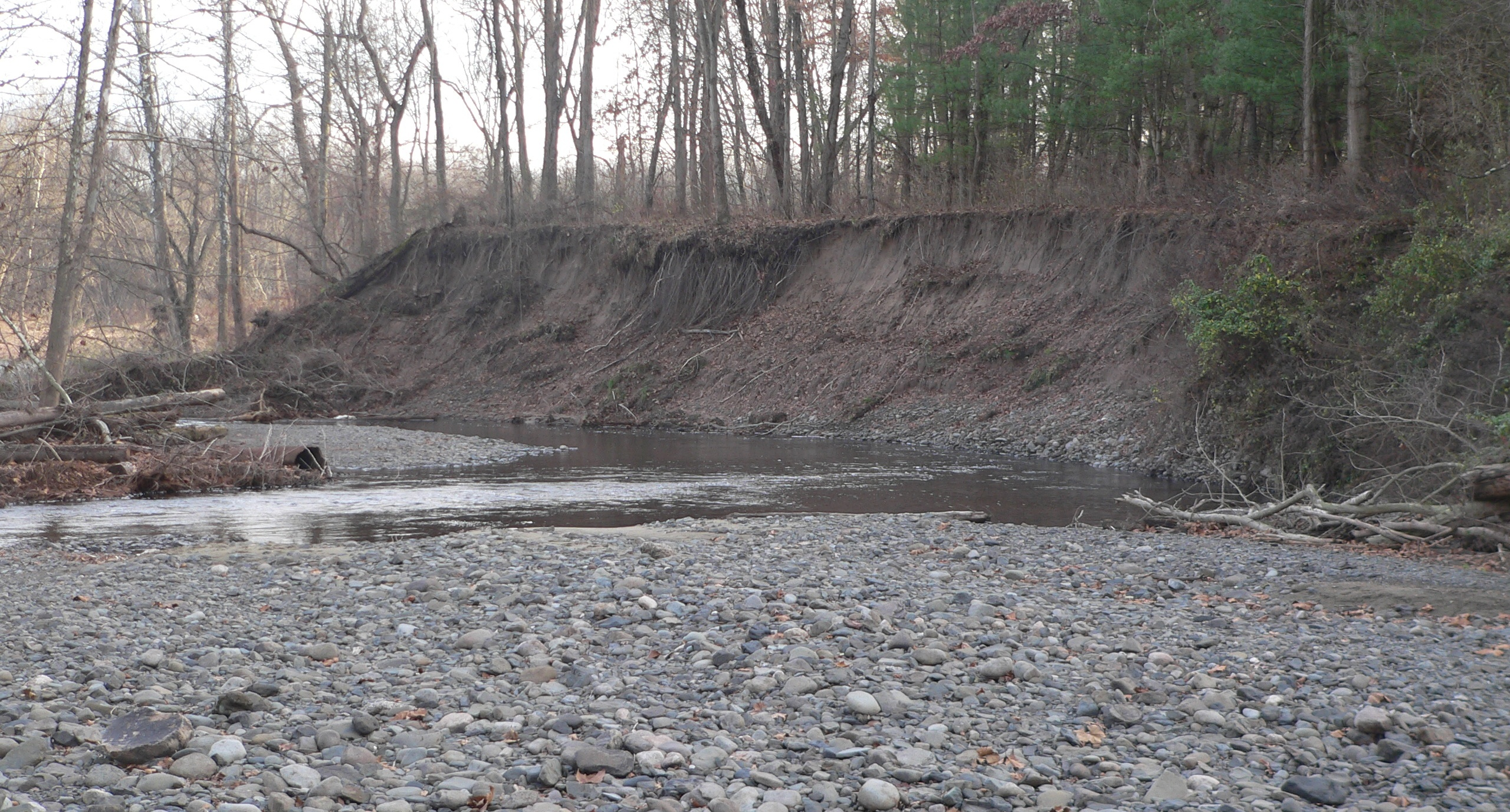
- South bank of Raymondskill Creek near confluence with Delaware River. The bank is eroding into the Manna archaeological site.

- Location within Sussex County, New Jersey Location within New Jersey Location within the United States
- Nearest city: Bushkill, Pennsylvania and Millbrook, New Jersey
- Area: 1,320 acres (530 ha)
- NRHP reference No.: 93000608

Significant dates
- Added to NRHP: April 19, 1993
- Designated NHL: April 19, 1993

Minisink Archeological Site, also known as Minisink Historic District, is an archaeological site of 1320 acres located in both Sussex County, New Jersey and Pike County, Pennsylvania. It was part of a region occupied by Munsee-speaking Lenape that extended from southern New York across northern New Jersey to northeastern Pennsylvania. The Munsee were speakers of one of the three major language dialects of the Lenape Native American tribe. This interstate territory became the most important Munsee community for the majority of the 17th and 18th centuries.

== History ==
The area has supported human habitation for 10,000 years. The site's archaeology has been studied for more than 100 years, since the discovery in 1900 of Native American burials, and Indian and European artifacts. Since the late twentieth century, researchers have concentrated on trying to understand Native American cultures rather than simply retrieve artifacts and antiquities. "Today, Minisink remains one of the most extensive, best preserved, and most intensively studied archaeological locales in the Northeast."

The site was declared a National Historic Landmark in 1993. Excavations at the site have helped reveal historic interactions between European and Lenape people in Munsee country. Hundreds of early stone tools recovered at the site, along with remains of fish and fruit, indicated a more diverse diet than previously expected by researchers.

Two 100-year floods, one in September 2004 and one in April 2005, caused severe erosion to one of the contributing archaeological sites, 36Pi04 (Manna Site) located at the confluence of the Raymondskill Creek and Delaware River. Approximately 20% of the site was compromised during the floods. The National Park Service is collaborating with the Temple University Department of Anthropology to stabilize the banks as well as conduct archaeological research and field schools at the site.

== See also ==
- National Register of Historic Places listings in Sussex County, New Jersey
- National Register of Historic Places listings in Pike County, Pennsylvania
- List of Native American archaeological sites on the National Register of Historic Places in Pennsylvania
- List of National Historic Landmarks in Pennsylvania
- List of National Historic Landmarks in New Jersey
