= Millrift, Pennsylvania =

Unincorporated community in Pennsylvania, US

- Unincorporated community
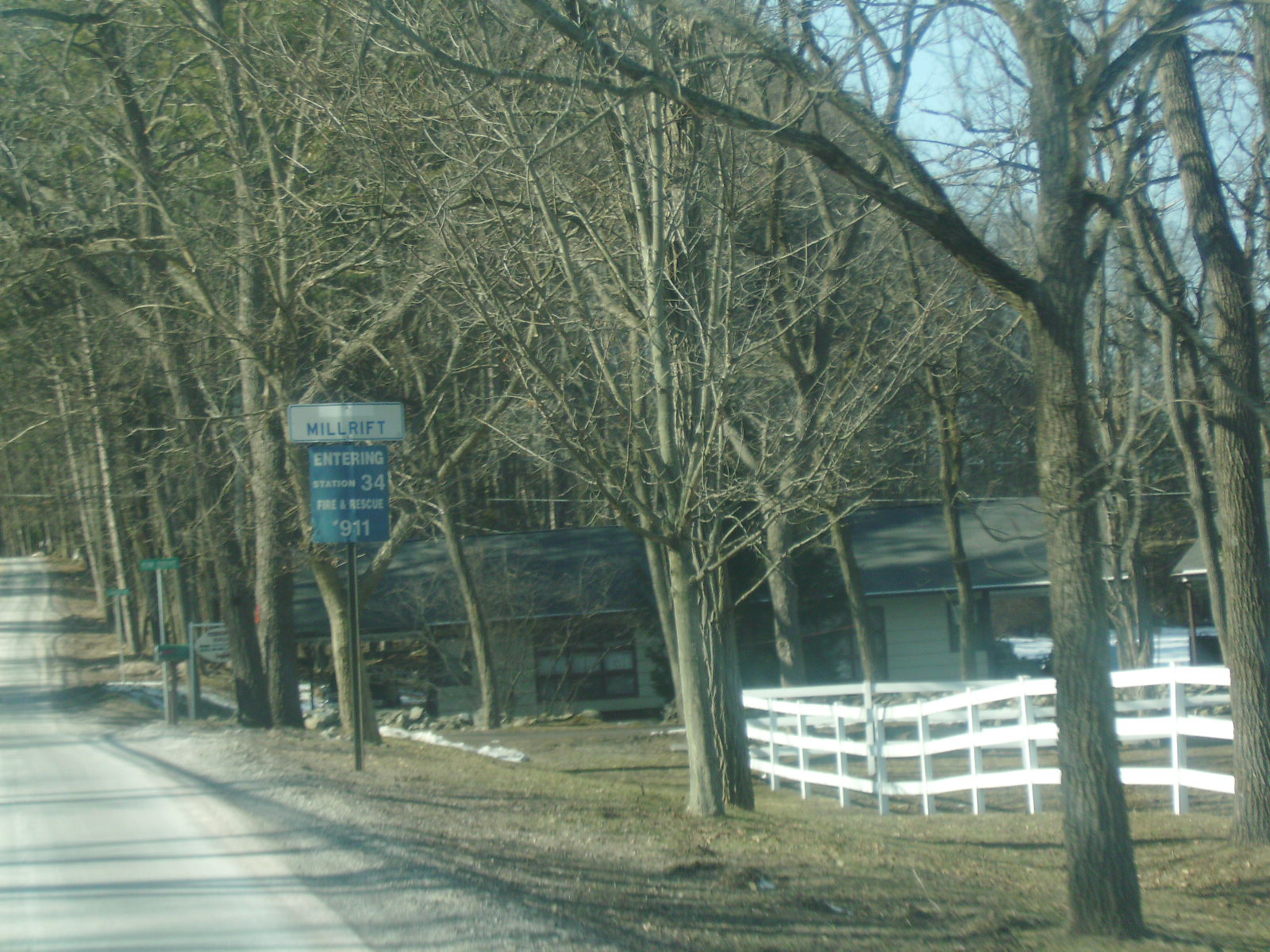

- Location within Pennsylvania Location within the United States
- Coordinates: 41°24′32.3″N 74°44′34.7″W
- Country: United States
- State: Pennsylvania
- County: Pike
- Township: Westfall
- Elevation: 466 ft (142 m)
- Time zone: UTC-5 (Eastern (EST))
  - Summer (DST): UTC-4 (EDT)
- ZIP code: 18340
- Area codes: 570 and 272
- GNIS feature ID: 1199171

Millrift is an unincorporated community that is located in Westfall Township in Pike County, Pennsylvania, United States.

== History and notable features ==
Situated at the intersection of Delaware Drive and Bluestone Boulevard, on the west bank of the Delaware River, northwest of Matamoras, Millrift was settled by James Sawyer, who moved his family from Orange County, New York.

The location was where Bush Kill meets the Delaware River, and eventually became known as Saw-Mill Rift. The Erie Railroad established a crossover for passing trains at the location and nicknamed it Turnover. The United States Postal Service opened a station there in 1884 under the current name of Mill Rift.
