= Stillwater Natural Area =

Natural area in Pennsylvania

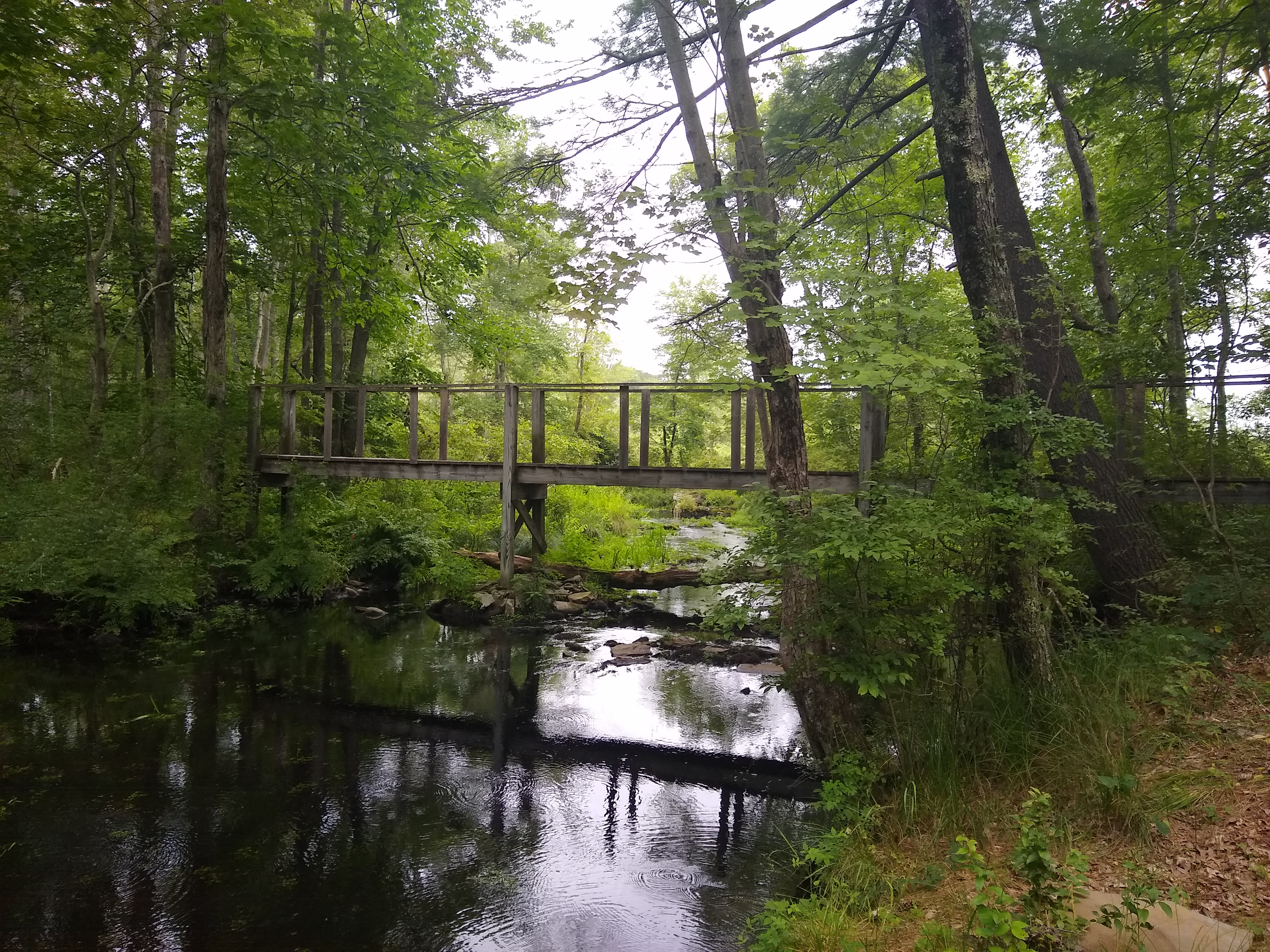
- Hikers' footbrige over Little Bushkill Creek in Stillwater Natural Area

- Location within Pennsylvania
- Location: Pike County, Pennsylvania
- Nearest town: Bushkill
- Coordinates: 41°14′07″N 75°01′30″W
- Area: 1,931 acres (781 ha)

Stillwater Natural Area is a 1,931-acre (781 ha) protected area in Pike County, Pennsylvania, United States. It is part of Delaware State Forest.

== Description ==
The Natural Area was established to protect a mixed hardwood forest, and it contains a segment of Little Bushkill Creek that offers "still water" for canoeists. Areas featuring swamps or very dense forest cover served as a refuge for deserters during the American Civil War, who built cabins on islands in the swamps.

The area is traversed by the Northeast Spur of the Thunder Swamp Trail, and it includes the secluded Big Bear Swamp which houses a large population of black bears. The area is indicative of the poorly-drained forest lands of the Pocono Plateau, sporting numerous swamps and wetlands.
