= Nyce Farm =

Historic house in Pennsylvania, United States

- U.S. National Register of Historic Places
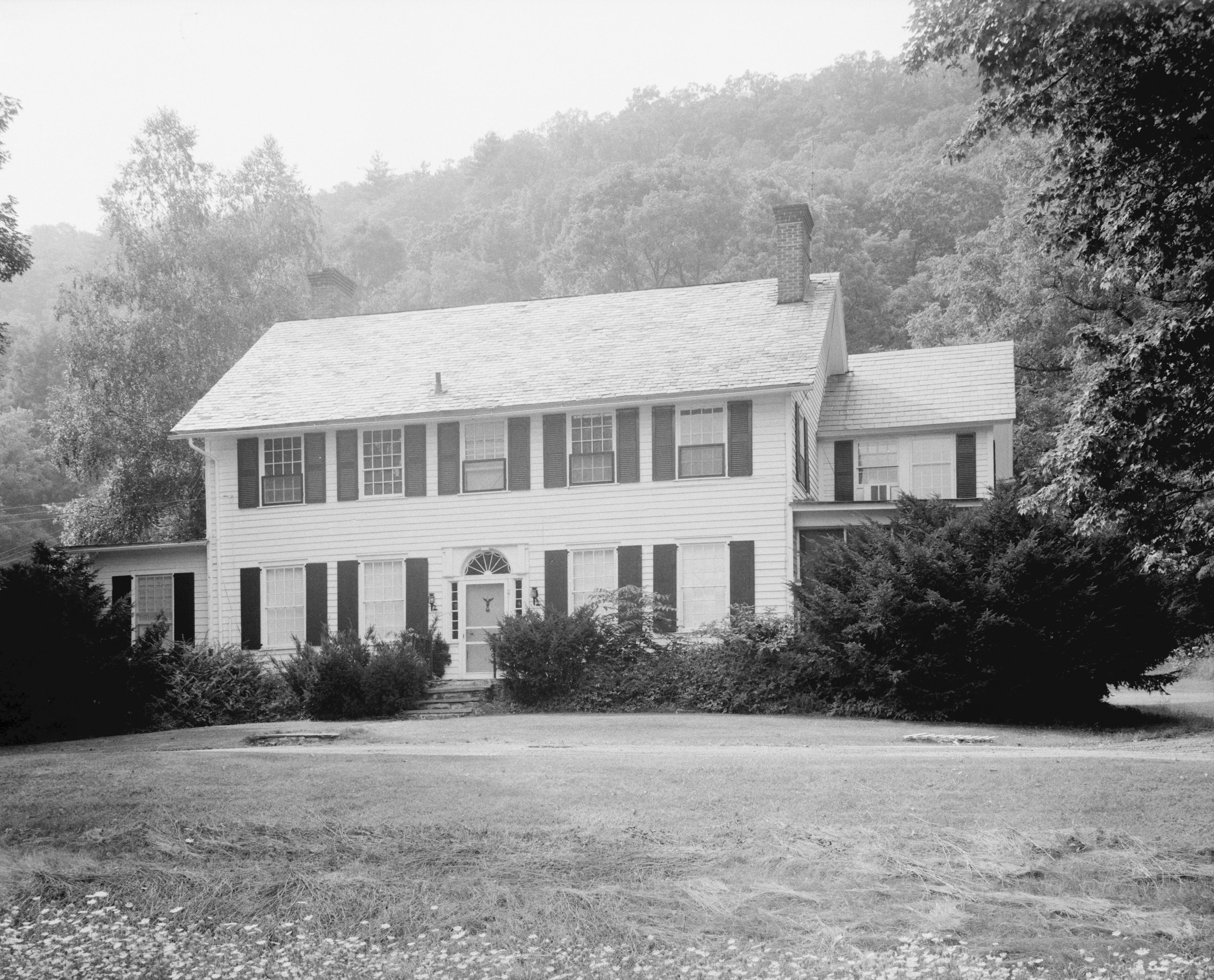
- William Nyce House, HABS Photo, August 1970

- Location within Pennsylvania Location within the United States
- Location: Northwest of Bushkill on U.S. Route 209, Lehman Township, Pennsylvania
- Coordinates: 41°8′24″N 74°55′50″W
- Area: 7 acres (2.8 ha)
- NRHP reference No.: 79000240
- Added to NRHP: July 23, 1979

The Nyce Farm, also known as the Eshback Farm and Van Gordon House, is an historic home and farm complex that is located in the Delaware Water Gap National Recreation Area in Lehman Township, Pike County, Pennsylvania, United States.

It was added to the National Register of Historic Places in 1979.

== History and architectural features ==
The farmhouse on this historic property dates to the early nineteenth century, is a large, 2 1/2-story, five-bay, clapboard-sided frame dwelling. The original farmhouse, known as the Jacobus Van Gorden House, was created as a 2 1/2-story, three-bay, rubble sandstone dwelling. Also located on the property are five contributing structures, including a barn, garage, and storage buildings.
