= Nearpass House =

Historic house in Pennsylvania, United States

- U.S. National Register of Historic Places
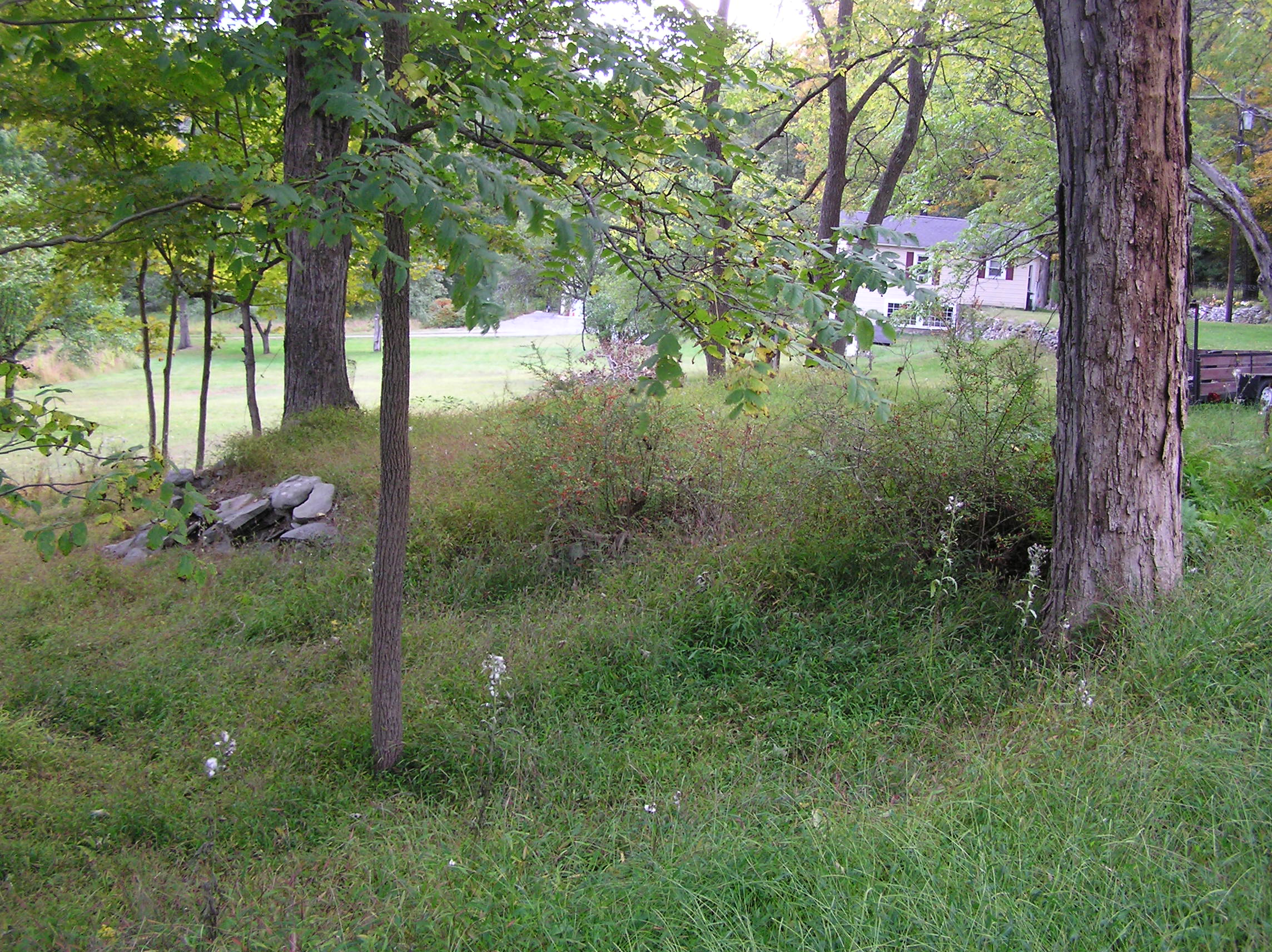

- Location within Pennsylvania Location within the United States
- Location: Sandflats Rd. at Mill Rift, Westfall Township, Pennsylvania
- Coordinates: 41°25′7″N 74°44′30″W
- Area: less than one acre
- Built: c. 1820, c. 1840
- Built by: Balthus Nearpass
- Architectural style: Vernacular early 19th century
- MPS: Upper Delaware Valley, New York and Pennsylvania MPS
- NRHP reference No.: 93000849
- Added to NRHP: August 19, 1993

The Nearpass House was an historic home that was located at Mill Rift in Westfall Township, Pike County, Pennsylvania, United States.

It was added to the National Register of Historic Places in 1993.

== History and architectural features ==
Built circa 1820, this historic structure was a small, 1 1/2-story, wooden dwelling of post-and-beam construction. A lean-to addition was built circa 1840, and the building was sided and roofed in the twentieth century. Maintenance was neglected, however, and it was demolished by the current owner, Paul Farrell, around 2007.

Also known as the Knickerbocker House and the Padgett Homestead, after subsequent occupants, it was the earliest remaining building from the early settlement of Mill Rift.
