= Lord House =

Historic house in Pennsylvania, United States

- U.S. National Register of Historic Places
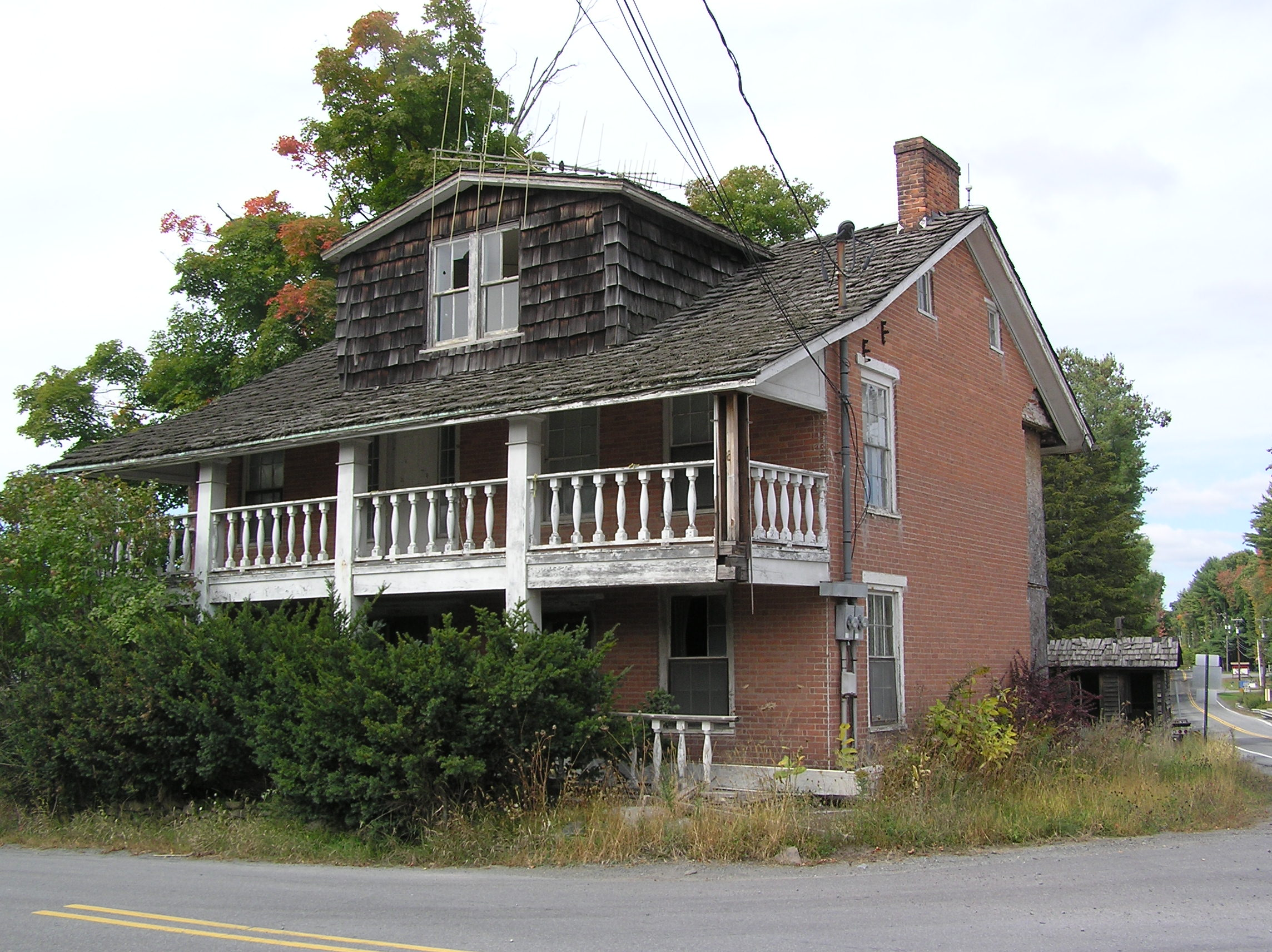

- Location within Pennsylvania Location within the United States
- Location: Pennsylvania Route 739 at Lords Valley, Blooming Grove Township, Pennsylvania
- Coordinates: 41°22′4″N 75°3′49″W
- Area: 1 acre (0.40 ha)
- Built: 1850
- Built by: Simeon Lord,
- Architectural style: Georgian
- NRHP reference No.: 80003625
- Added to NRHP: June 30, 1980

Lord House is an historic home that is located in Lords Valley, Blooming Grove Township, Pike County, Pennsylvania, United States.

It was added to the National Register of Historic Places in 1980.

== History and architectural features ==
Built in 1850, this historic structure is a 2 1/2-story, brick dwelling that sits on a random fieldstone foundation. Designed in a vernacular, Georgian style, it has a 1 1/2-story rear wing, gable roof, and two-story front porch. The Lords Valley Post Office was housed in this dwelling from 1853 to 1955.
