= Peters House (Milford, Pennsylvania) =

Historic house in Pennsylvania, United States

- U.S. National Register of Historic Places
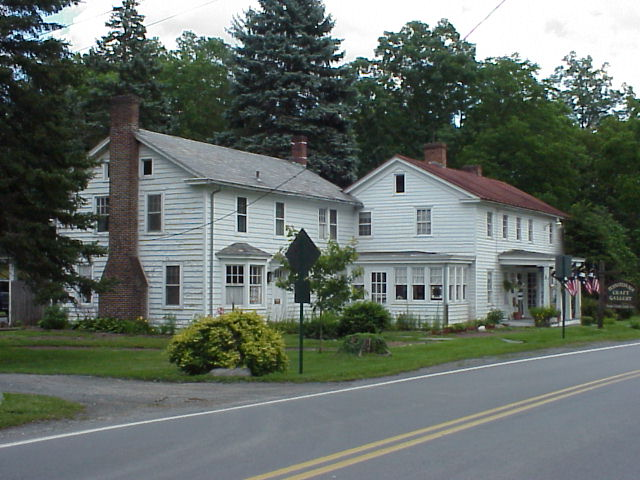
- Peters House

- Location within Pennsylvania Location within the United States
- Location: U.S. Route 209 in Bushkill, Lehman Township, Pennsylvania
- Coordinates: 41°5′36″N 75°0′8″W
- Area: 0.8 acres (0.32 ha)
- Built: c. 1746, 1943
- NRHP reference No.: 79000239
- Added to NRHP: August 24, 1979

Peters House, also known as the Corner House Antique Store, is a historic home located in the Delaware Water Gap National Recreation Area at Lehman Township, Pike County, Pennsylvania. It is a two-story, frame dwelling in two sections. The older section dates to 1746. Attached to it is an addition with three-story garage built in 1943.

It was added to the National Register of Historic Places in 1979.
