= Buckhorn Natural Area =

Natural area in Pennsylvania

- Location within Pennsylvania
- Location: Pike County, Pennsylvania
- Nearest town: Milford
- Coordinates: 41°24′32″N 74°48′53″W
- Area: 535 acres (217 ha)

Buckhorn Natural Area is a 535-acre (217 ha) protected area in Pike County, Pennsylvania, United States. It is part of Delaware State Forest. It is within the larger Buckhorn Recreation Area that also includes the nearby Stairway Wild Area.

== Description ==
The Natural Area was established to protect rare reptiles and amphibians, and it sports many signs of beaver activity. The area is not accessible by road and can only be reached via a lengthy hiking trail. The area is also recommended by the National Park Service for primitive camping by visitors to the nearby Upper Delaware Scenic and Recreational River.
