= Turn Store and the Tinsmith's Shop =

- U.S. National Register of Historic Places
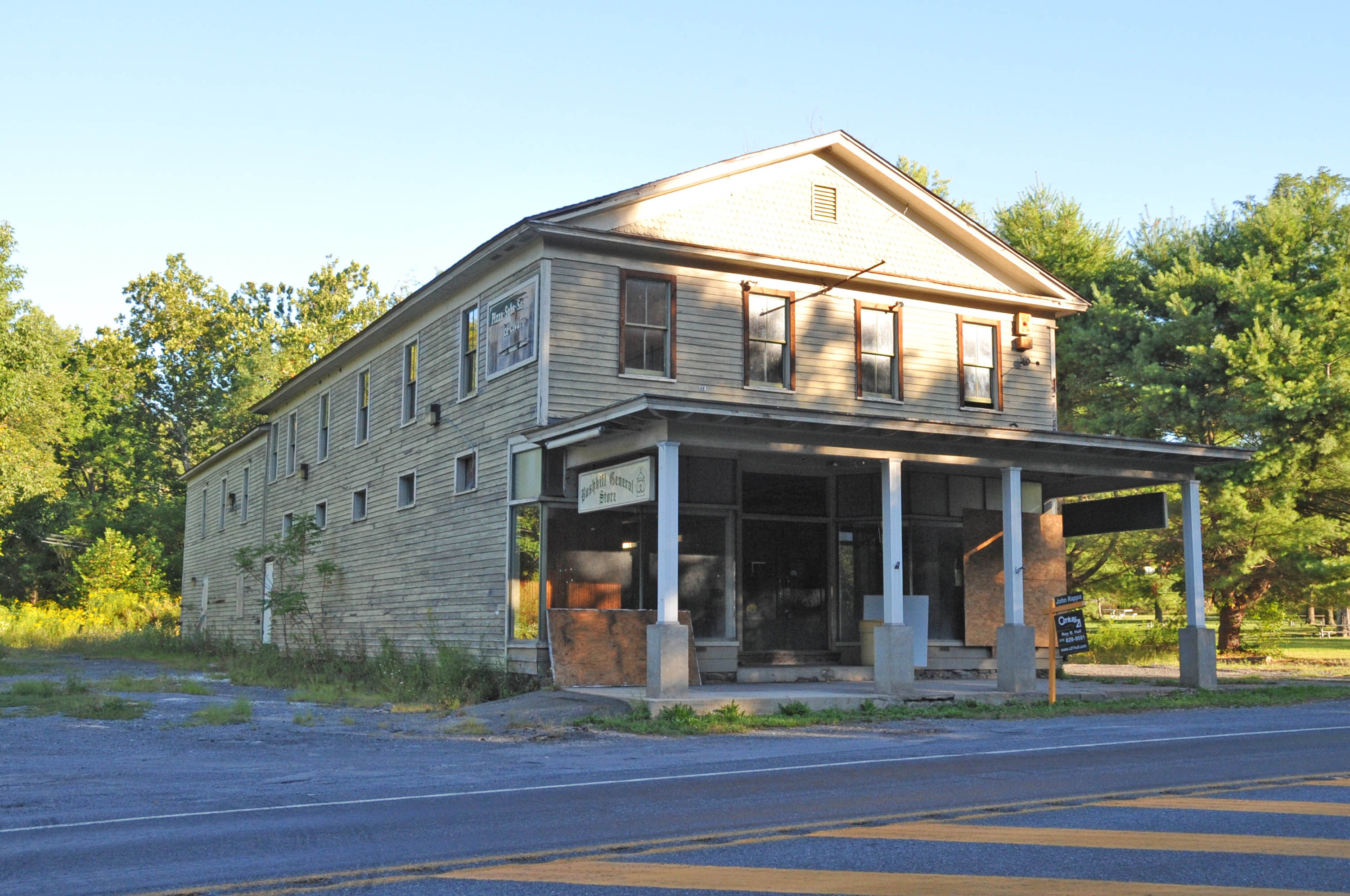

- Location within Pennsylvania Location within the United States
- Location: U.S. Route 209 in Bushkill, Lehman Township, Pennsylvania
- Coordinates: 41°5′32″N 75°0′11″W
- Area: 0.5 acres (0.20 ha)
- Built: c. 1837, c. 1916
- Architectural style: Late Victorian, Greek Revival
- NRHP reference No.: 78000260
- Added to NRHP: September 18, 1978

The Turn Store and the Tinsmith's Shop, also known as Turn's Bushkill General Store, are two historic commercial buildings that are located in the Delaware Water Gap National Recreation Area at Lehman Township, Pike County, Pennsylvania.

It was added to the National Register of Historic Places in 1978.

== History and architectural features ==
The Turn General Store is a two to two-and-one-half-story, frame building that was created in two sections. The older section dates to circa 1837 and is situated at the rear of the present building. Attached to the front is an addition that was built circa 1916. The Tinsmith's Shop was built circa 1837, and is a two-story, frame building that sits on a fieldstone foundation. It has a slate covered gable roof.

During the 1990s, this property was sold to Guy Gentile and became "Deli Depot" which sold grocery, deli, and craft items. In 2012, Anthony and Vanessa Palma purchased and restored the building. It operated as The Roost Deli and Market, and as of 2026 operates as Nick's Knacks and Kayaks at The General Store of Bushkill.
