= Brodhead Farm =

Historic house in Pennsylvania, United States

- Brodhead-Heller Farm
- U.S. National Register of Historic Places
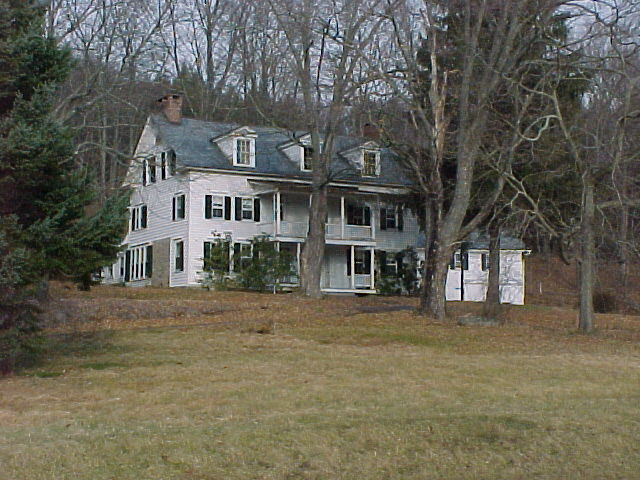
- Wheat Plains House

- Location within Pennsylvania Location within the United States
- Location: Northeast of Bushkill on U.S. Route 209, Lehman Township, Pennsylvania
- Coordinates: 41°8′59″N 74°55′12″W
- Area: 9.4 acres (3.8 ha)
- NRHP reference No.: 79000242
- Added to NRHP: July 23, 1979

Brodhead Farm, also known as the Brodhead-Heller Farm and/or "Wheat Plains," is a historic home located in the Delaware Water Gap National Recreation Area at Lehman Township, Pike County, Pennsylvania. It was established in the late 1770s by Garret Brodhead (1733-1804), a soldier of the American Revolution. The main structure is a large 2 1/2-story, clapboard sided dwelling. It has a slate covered gable roof with dormers. The oldest section is of log construction and it was added on numerous times over the succeeding years. Also on the property are a variety of modern barns and farm outbuildings.

It was added to the National Register of Historic Places in 1979.
