= Blooming Grove Township, Pike County, Pennsylvania =

Township in Pennsylvania, US

Blooming Grove Township, Pennsylvania
- Township
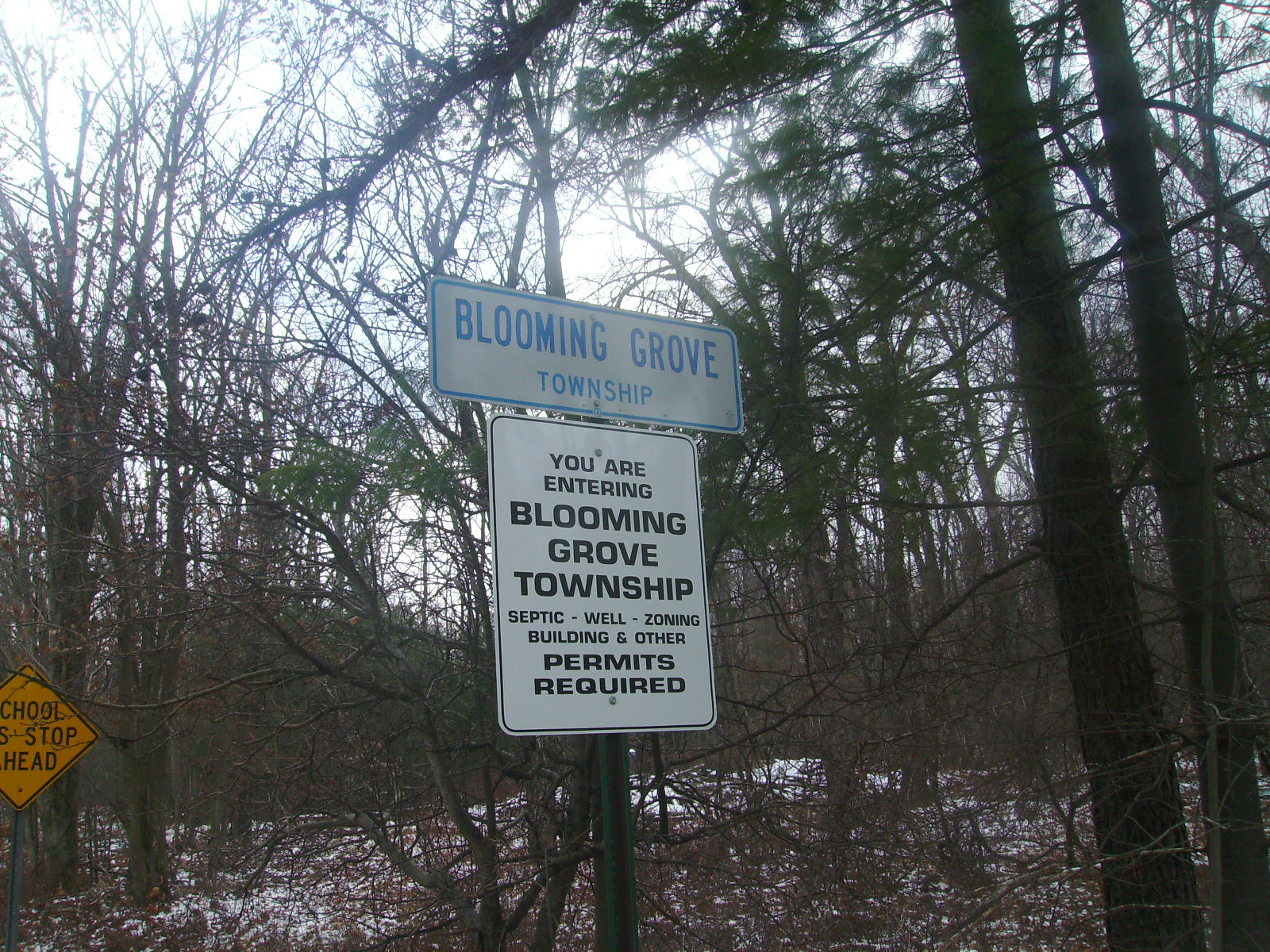
- Signs along PA 739 entering Blooming Grove Township

- Seal

- Location in Pike County and the state of Pennsylvania.

- Location of Pennsylvania in the United States
- Coordinates: 41°22′36″N 74°59′58″W
- Country: United States
- State: Pennsylvania
- County: Pike

Government
  - Mayor: Carl " Jakie J Watash" Schick

Area
  - Total: 76.99 sq mi (199.40 km^{2})
  - Land: 74.83 sq mi (193.81 km^{2})
  - Water: 2.15 sq mi (5.58 km^{2})
- Elevation: 1,194 ft (364 m)

Population (2020)
  - Total: 5,421 ▲
  - Estimate (2021): 5,545
  - Density: 62.4/sq mi (24.09/km^{2})
- Time zone: UTC-5 (EST)
  - Summer (DST): UTC-4 (EDT)
- Area code: 570
- FIPS code: 42-103-07088
- Website: bloominggrovetownship.com

Blooming Grove Township is a township in Pike County, Pennsylvania, United States. The population was 5,421 at the 2020 census.

== History ==
The Lord House was added to the National Register of Historic Places in 1980.

On September 12, 2014, outside the Troop R barracks of the Pennsylvania State Police in the township, a sniper opened fire on Pennsylvania State Police troopers with a .308-caliber rifle during a late-night shift change, killing Corporal Bryon K. Dickson II, 38, and critically injuring trooper Alex Douglass. Eric Matthew Frein was identified as the sole suspect of the ambush and was sought by federal and state authorities for the ambush, until his apprehension at 6 p.m. on Thursday, October 30, ending a seven-week search.

== Geography ==
According to the United States Census Bureau, the township has a total area of 77.0 square miles (199 km^{2}), of which 74.8 square miles (194 km^{2}) is land and 2.2 square miles (5.7 km^{2}) (2.86%) is water. It contains part of the census-designated place of Hemlock Farms.

== Demographics ==
Historical population
Census	Pop.	Note	%±
1860	339		—
1870	378		11.5%
1880	472		24.9%
1890	351		−25.6%
1900	446		27.1%
1910	375		−15.9%
1920	263		−29.9%
1930	317		20.5%
1940	384		21.1%
1950	358		−6.8%
1960	424		18.4%
1970	548		29.2%
1980	1,176		114.6%
1990	2,022		71.9%
2000	3,621		79.1%
2010	4,819		33.1%
2020	5,421		12.5%
Pike County Demographics

As of the census of 2010, there were 4,819 people, 1,834 households, and 1,348 families residing in the township. The population density was 64.4 inhabitants per square mile (24.9/km^{2}). There were 3,971 housing units at an average density of 53.1 per square mile (20.5/km^{2}). The racial makeup of the township was 91.8% White, 3.5% African American, 0.2% Native American, 1.1% Asian, 0.03% Pacific Islander, 1.7% from other races, and 1.8% from two or more races. Hispanic or Latino of any race were 5.4% of the population.

There were 1,834 households, out of which 24% had children under the age of 18 living with them, 61.1% were married couples living together, 7.4% had a female householder with no husband present, and 26.5% were non-families. 22.1% of all households were made up of individuals, and 12.1% had someone living alone who was 65 years of age or older. The average household size was 2.44 and the average family size was 2.85.

In the township the population was spread out, with 18.6% under the age of 18, 57.2% from 18 to 64, and 24.2% who were 65 years of age or older. The median age was 47.5 years.

The median income for a household in the township was $42,386, and the median income for a family was $46,250. Males had a median income of $31,941 versus $28,333 for females. The per capita income for the township was $20,920. About 6.4% of families and 8.6% of the population were below the poverty line, including 14.3% of those under age 18 and 4.6% of those age 65 or over.

== Education ==
The school district is Wallenpaupack Area School District.
