= Delaware State Forest =

State forest in Pennsylvania, US

- IUCN category VI (protected area with sustainable use of natural resources)
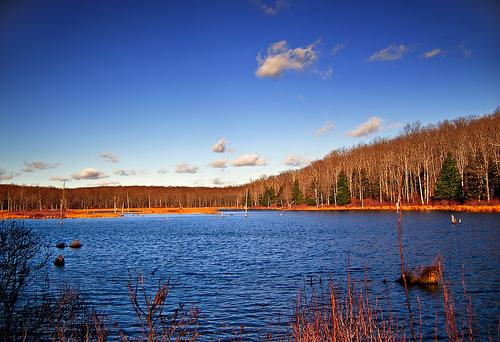
- Painter Swamp, Pike County, within Delaware State Forest.

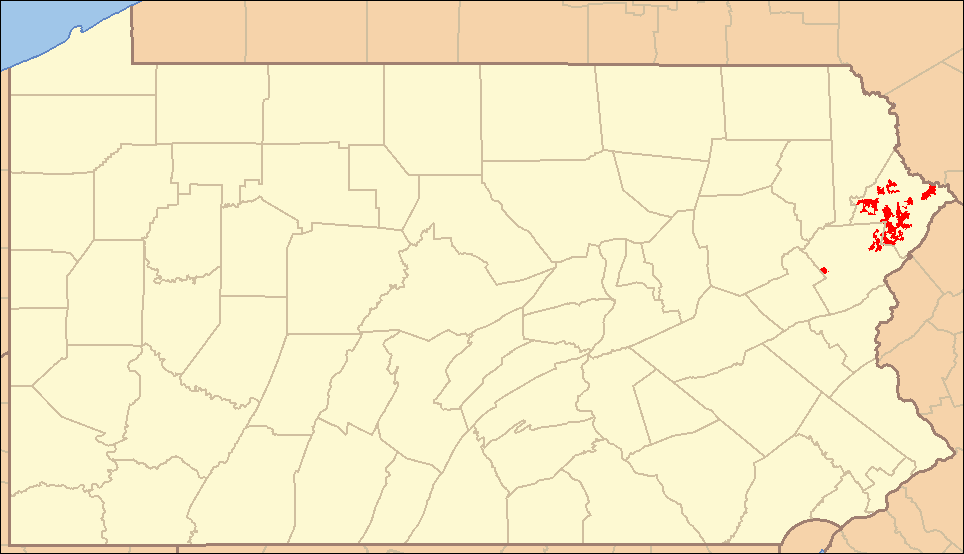
- Location of Delaware State Forest in Pennsylvania
- Location: Pennsylvania, United States
- Coordinates: 41°07′24″N 75°09′59″W
- Area: 85,114 acres (344.44 km^{2})
- Elevation: 1,145 ft (349 m)
- Governing body: Pennsylvania Department of Conservation and Natural Resources
- Website: Delaware State Forest

Delaware State Forest is a 85,114-acre (344.44 km^{2}) Pennsylvania state forest in Pennsylvania Bureau of Forestry District #19. The main office is located in Dingmans Ferry in Pike County, Pennsylvania in the United States.

The forest has several tracts in Monroe and Pike counties.

== History ==
Delaware State Forest was formed as a direct result of the depletion of the forests of Pennsylvania that took place during the mid-to-late 19th century. Conservationists like Dr. Joseph Rothrock became concerned that the forests would not regrow if they were not managed properly. Lumber and Iron companies had harvested the old-growth forests for various reasons. They clear cut the forests and left behind nothing but dried tree tops and rotting stumps. The sparks of passing steam locomotives ignited wildfires that prevented the formation of second growth forests. The conservationists feared that the forest would never regrow if there was not a change in the philosophy of forest management. They called for the state to purchase land from the lumber and iron companies and the lumber and iron companies were more than willing to sell their land since that had depleted the natural resources of the forests. The changes began to take place in 1895 when Dr. Rothrock was appointed the first commissioner of the Pennsylvania Department of Forests and Waters, the forerunner of today's Pennsylvania Department of Conservation and Natural Resources. The Pennsylvania General Assembly passed a piece of legislation in 1897 that authorized the purchase of "unseated lands for forest reservations". This was the beginning of the State Forest system.

== Neighboring state forest districts ==
- Pinchot State Forest (north)
- William Penn State Forest (south)
- Weiser State Forest (west)

== State parks ==
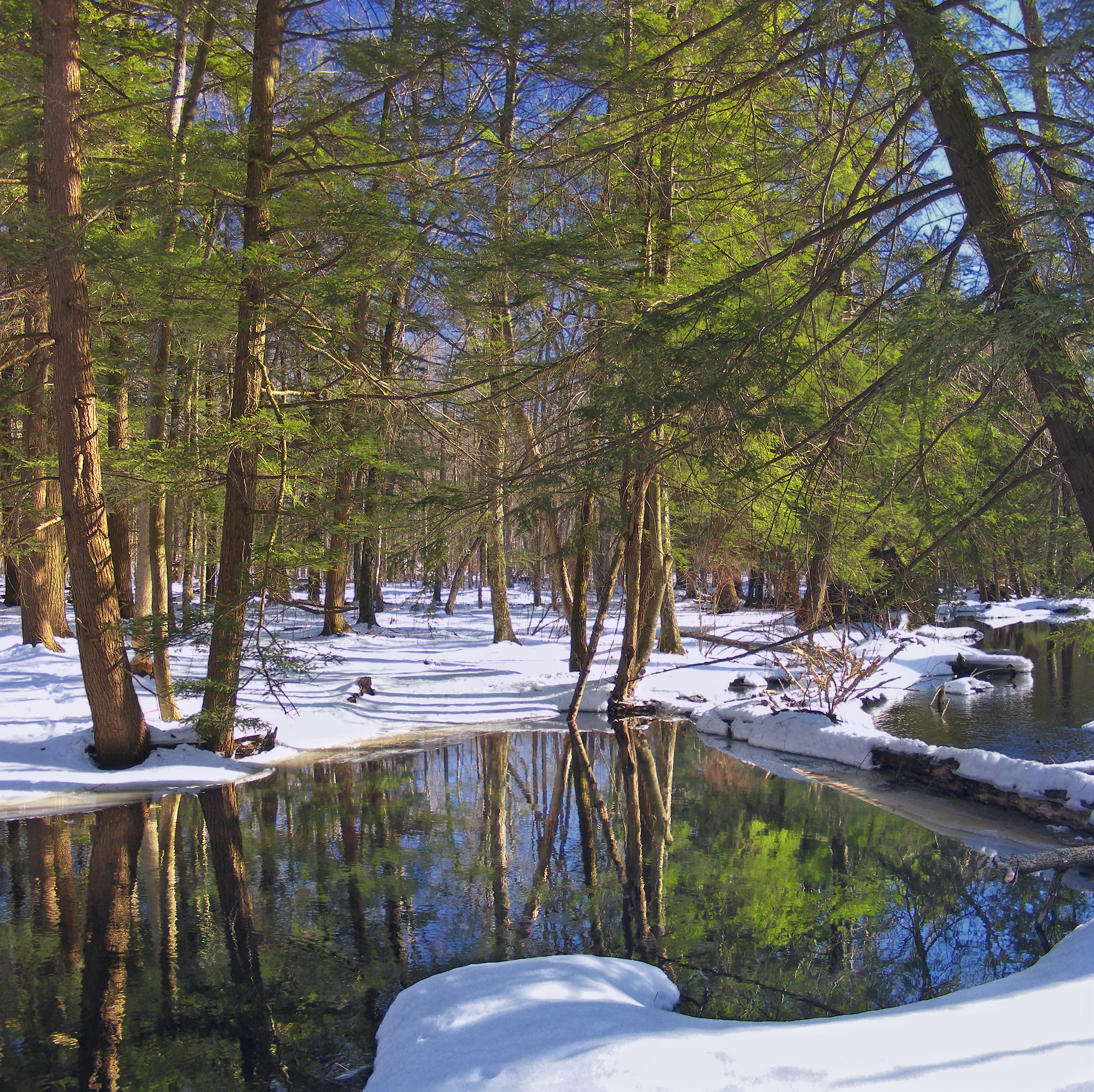
Spruce Run within Delaware State Forest

- Big Pocono State Park
- Gouldsboro State Park
- Promised Land State Park
- Tobyhanna State Park

== Natural and wild areas ==
- Bruce Lake Natural Area
- Buckhorn Natural Area
- Little Mud Pond Swamp Natural Area
- Pennel Run Natural Area
- Pine Lake Natural Area
- Stillwater Natural Area
- Stairway Wild Area
