= Geology of Pennsylvania =

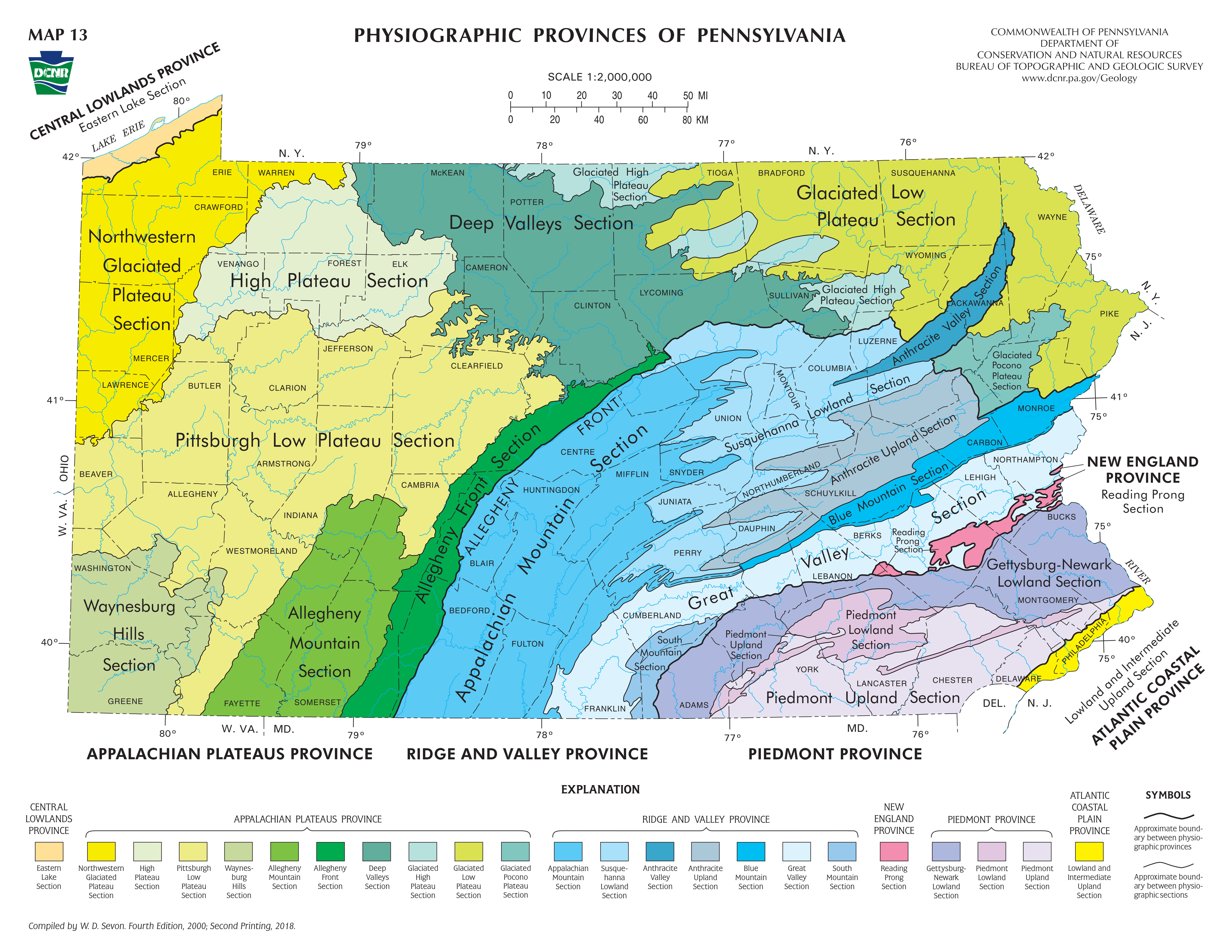
Pennsylvania's physiographic provinces

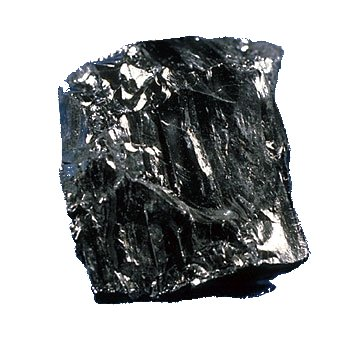
The Coal Region of Northeastern Pennsylvania has abundant anthracite coal, a high-value energy source.

The Geology of Pennsylvania consists of six distinct physiographic provinces, three of which are subdivided into different sections. Each province has its own economic advantages and geologic hazards and plays an important role in shaping everyday life in the state. From the southeast corner to the northwest corner of the state, they include: the Atlantic Plain Province, the Piedmont Province, the New England Province, the Ridge and Valley Province, the Appalachian Province, and the Central Lowlands Province.

A majority of the rocks in Pennsylvania exposed at the surface are sedimentary and were deposited during the Paleozoic Era. Almost all of the metamorphic and igneous rocks are confined to the southeast portion of the state. A total of four orogenies have affected the rocks of the Commonwealth including the Grenville orogeny, the Taconic orogeny, the Acadian orogeny, and the Appalachian orogeny. The Appalachian event has left the most evidence and has continued to shape the landscape of the state. The Pennsylvania terrain has also been affected by continental rifting during the Mesozoic era.

Pleistocene glaciers have also repeatedly visited the state over the last 100,000 years. These glaciers have left some evidence and carved out much of the landscape of the northern tier of the state.

A rock with high economic value from Pennsylvania is anthracite coal. Before mining began, there was an estimated 22.8 billion tons of anthracite in Pennsylvania. In 2001, 12 billion tons still remained in the ground, most of which was not economically feasible to mine. American geologists recognized the importance of Pennsylvania's coal region and named the Upper Carboniferous Period the Pennsylvanian Period because of the abundance of coal in the state. Despite this, Celestine was proposed as the state mineral in 2002. The proposal however, was not approved by the state legislature.

Pennsylvania is also home to the famous Drake Oil Well in Titusville which helped give rise to the modern oil industry and two brand name motor oils, Quaker State (now owned by Royal Dutch Shell) and Pennzoil. Pennsylvania also has reserves of natural gas from both deeply buried source rocks and coal-bed areas.

== Atlantic Coastal Plain ==
One of the smallest physiographic provinces in the state is confined to Philadelphia, Delaware, and Bucks counties along the Delaware River. Local relief is less than 200 feet (61 m) and much of the bedrock is buried under recent alluvial deposits. On the geologic map, "Trenton Gravel" is used to describe most of these sediments. Much of the alluvial sediments that exist here are sand, silt, and clays. The traditional boundary of the coastal plain is the Fall Line. The coastal plain in Pennsylvania was once home to thousands of acres of fresh water tidal marsh. This was important in the early development of Philadelphia and Chester. Many of the small tributaries to the Delaware have cut small but impressive gorges into the bedrock, including the Ridley Creek, the Chester Creek, and the Wissahickon Creek. Flash floods are becoming a local problem in the province.

== Piedmont ==
The Piedmont in Pennsylvania is divided into three distinct sections: the Piedmont Uplands, the Piedmont Lowlands, and the Gettysburg-Newark Lowlands. Much of the Piedmont is becoming urbanized and developed. Some of the best farmland in the state is in this region, specifically Lancaster and Chester counties.

=== Piedmont Uplands ===
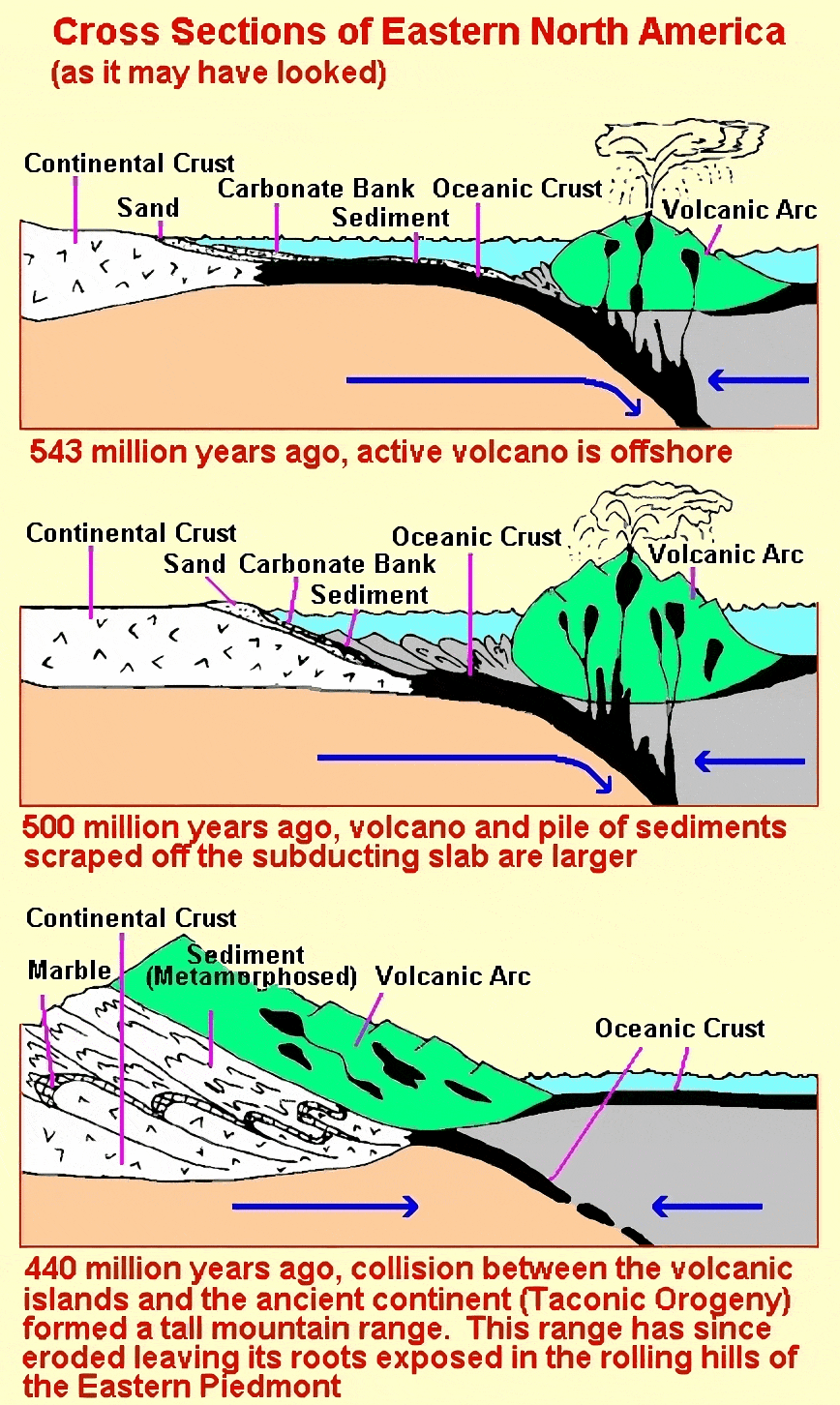
The top plate illustrates the tectonic setting for the sediments of Pennsylvania

This section is characterized by the metamorphic rocks that provide much of the bedrock for this area. The oldest exposed rocks in Pennsylvania are found here and consist of the Baltimore Gneiss. These rocks have a complex history and a vast array of different minerals. They are similar in many respects to their cousins in northern and central Maryland, immediately to the south. Much of the rock was altered during the formation of Rodinia during the Grenville orogeny. These rocks eventually provided the platform for the deposition of sediment that would become the Wissahickon Formation during a rifting of Rodinia. Sea floor spreading continued until a passive margin developed along the new Iapetus Ocean and a beach strandline developed. These sediments eventually became the Chickies Formation.

Siliclasitc and carbonate deposition continued through the Cambrian and into the Ordovician period. During the Taconic orogeny, more igneous intrusions and metamorphism occurred as the ancestral Taconic Mountains were pushed up. The sediments that were deposited in a sea between an island-arc and the Iapetus eventually were squeezed and deformed along a subduction zone. The sediments deposited in that sea are now located in the Great Valley section. (See below) The sediments placed from the rifting of Rodinia became the roots of the ancestral Taconics and went through their first wave of metamorphism during the Taconic orogeny. Additional waves of metamorphism continued up until the Alleghanian orogeny.

=== Piedmont Lowlands ===
The lowlands are underlain primarily by more easily eroded rocks such as limestone, dolomite, and phyllite. These rocks are relatively younger in age than the surrounding uplands and are likely the result of a quiet stretch of shallow sea deposition. Some of the rocks deposited during this time are also found in the Great Valley section but have been separated by the Gettysburg-Newark Lowland section. Relief is low and generally never rises above 700 feet (210 m). Karst terrain is problematic in this section.

=== Gettysburg-Newark Lowlands ===
This section is a bit misleading since there are hills as high as 1,200 feet (366 m) in this section. It is separated from the rest of the Piedmont sections due to the distinctive rock types found here. Also called the Triassic Basin, most of the bedrock are red sandstone, siltstone, and shale. A few formations are brown and black. The sediment accumulated during the rifting of Pangea in the Triassic age. Also, a basaltic igneous rock called diabase formed dykes and sills later in the Jurassic as the Atlantic Ocean began to form. Much of the rocks from this area have been eroded away, but the more erosion resistant diabase has left hills and small elevated regions throughout the section. The erosion patterns of these rocks played a pivotal role in the Battle of Gettysburg.

==== Buckingham Valley ====
A small slice of Paleozoic rocks, mostly carbonates, exists in Buckingham Township. These rocks lie north of the Furlong fault which is an offshoot of the larger Chalfont fault. Buckingham Mountain rises south of the valley and comprises quartzite. The other ridge is less prominent and is underlain by the conglomerates of the Stockton Formation. Karst is a localized problem in this area.

== New England ==
A small and fragmented province in northeastern Pennsylvania called the Reading Prong is akin to the crystalline bedrock found in much of New England. This is the southern end of the Hudson Highlands of New York and New Jersey (known as the Ramapo Mountains in New Jersey) and the Taconic Mountains of New York. The granitic rocks and quartzite of this area are highly metamorphosed and are Pre-Cambrian to Cambrian in age. Hills and ridges are locally steep and rounded at the top and form the hills around Reading, and to the south of the Lehigh Valley on South Mountain.

== Ridge and valley ==
This region in Pennsylvania, made famous by NASA's LANDSAT images, is the second-largest in the state and home to the famous anthracite fields. The rocks here are severely folded and contain numerous anticlines and synclines that plunge and fold back over each other. There are numerous thrust faults that help create a chaotic mess. Most of the deformation is result of continent to continent collision during the Alleghenian orogeny. There are seven distinct regions of the province and they are listed below. Much of the drainage patterns in the province is trellis.

=== South Mountain ===
South Mountain is the northern tip of the Blue Ridge Mountains. This region is characterized by broad flat ridges with deep narrow valleys. The rocks here are highly metamorphosed igneous and sedimentary rocks with some occasional dolomite. These rocks are Pre-Cambrian in age.

=== Great Valley ===
The Great Appalachian Valley is a long broad valley that extends from Canada to Alabama. In Pennsylvania, the valley is known by three names: (listed from north to south) the Lehigh Valley, the Lebanon Valley, and the Cumberland Valley. Rocks that characterize this region include: limestone, dolomite, slate, shale, sandstone, siltstone, and some scattered basalt. Almost all of the rocks in the Great Valley in Pennsylvania are Ordovician in age and were deposited during a quiet period before the Taconic orogeny. The limestones and dolomites of this area are extensively quarried in Pennsylvania. These carbonate rocks are used for variety of purposes including, crushed stone, cement manufacturing, fertilizers, and coal-mine dust (reduces acid mine drainage) Karst features are problematic in the Great Valley.

=== Blue Mountain ===
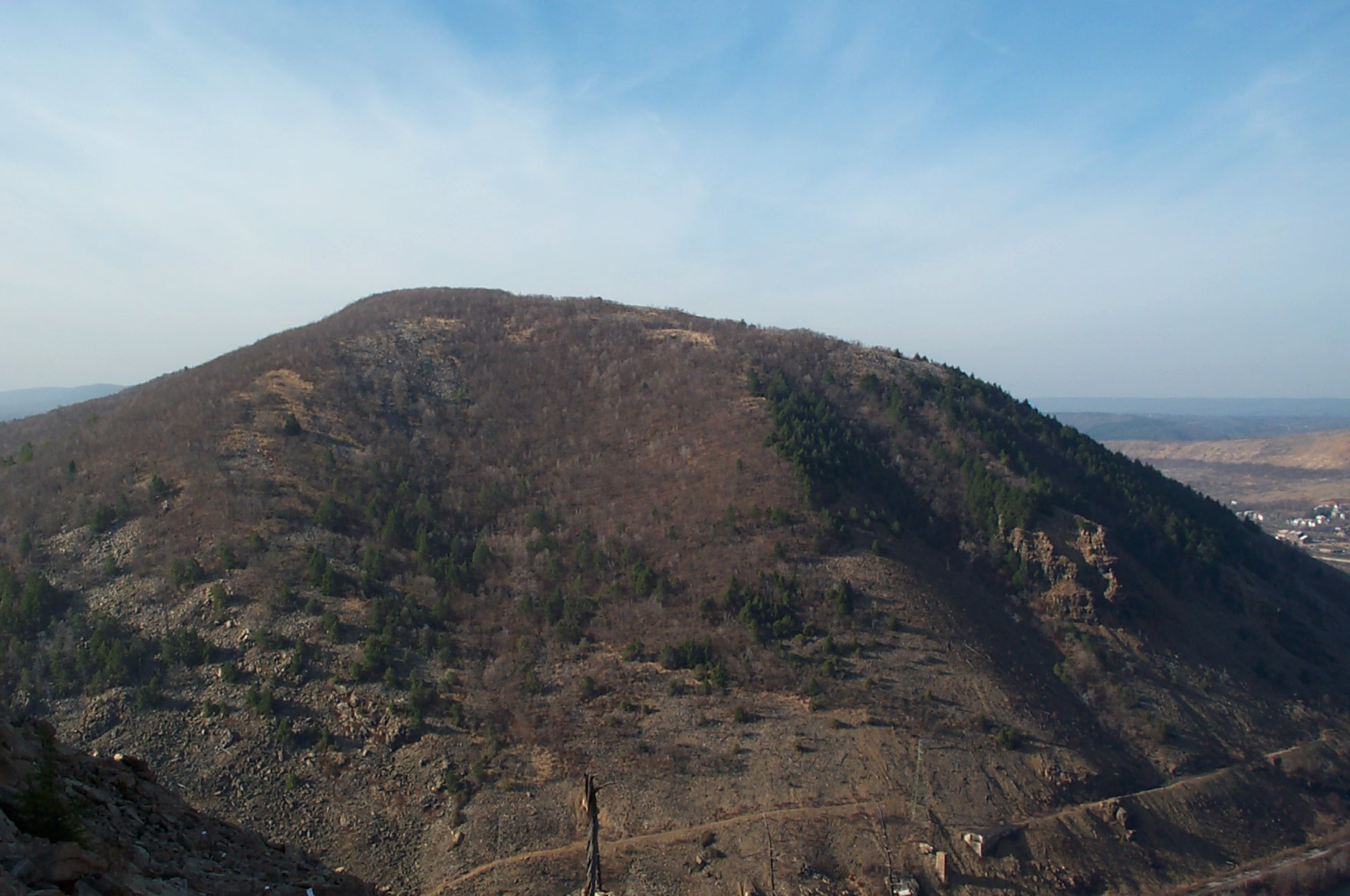
The Lehigh Gap of Blue Mountain from its east peak

The Blue Mountain or Blue Ridge region, like the ridgelines to its north and west, is one of a series of near parallel ridges that run for tens of miles, and are equally likely to be called Ridge or Mountain. Hence Blue Mountain is not to be confused with the Blue Ridge Mountains but instead, represents the sharp escarpment, a step in elevation separating the Appalachian Mountains from the pastoral basin famous as the landscape associated with the Pennsylvania Dutch in southern Pennsylvania called the Great Valley A physiographic province, as are these section titles. Many of Pennsylvania's water gaps cut through Blue Mountain including Delaware Water Gap, Lehigh Gap, Schuylkill Gap, Susquehanna Gap, and Swatara Gap. Also along the ridge, many "wind gaps" also exist. The rocks of the Blue Mountain section include mostly Silurian aged sandstone, conglomerate, siltstone, shale, and some limestone. Blue mountain is also known by the names Kittatinny Mountain (especially in New Jersey) and Hawk Mountain. One of the most prominent rock types of this section is the Shawangunk Formation, which is named after the Shawangunk Ridge of New York state.

The sediments that comprise Blue Mountain were deposited as a result of the highlands that formed after the Taconic orogeny. The first wave of sediments were coarse, gray, and poorly sorted. (The Shawngunk Formation) This combination of depositional features means that the source area was relatively close and deposited in a moist climate. These sediments grade into finer reddish sands and silts, (Bloomsburg Formation) as the source area became more distant and/or less productive. The climate during this time was drier.

=== Anthracite Upland ===
Arguably the most complex and most studied section in Pennsylvania. The state's Ridge and Valley province is home to one of Pennsylvania's most profitable coal fields in history, containing high-grade anthracite coal. The sediments deposited during the Mississippian Period came from highlands located to the southeast. Waves of mountain-building occasionally brought coarser-grained sediments onto the plain. As the mountains eroded, the sediments became more fine-grained. As the highlands became more distant, or eroded, the sands would grade into silt or clay.

Since the North American Plate was near the equator, a tropical climate existed and allowed dense forests to flourish. Beginning in the Late Mississippian, forests of Lycopodiophyta, Arthrophyta, Pteridophyta, and Pteridospermatophyta began to grow in these plains. As the conditions became more favorable for the dense forests to survive for hundred of thousands of years, much of the dead plant material became preserved in oxygen-depleted environments. The accumulation of this material became preserved in the vast coal deposits. The rise and fall of the mountains, along with changes in sea level, occurred numerous times (often in conjunction). These cyclical stratigraphic events sequences are preserved in the rock record and are often called cyclothems. By the Late Permian, much of the continental plate collision had subsided; the mountain building however, still continued. All of the sediments deposited during the previous 30 million years became folded and faulted as the supercontinent Pangea was finally formed.

It would take 150 million years for the mountains of this area to achieve the shapes seen today. These mountains are steep-sided and valleys are canoe-shaped, largely due to the area's complex folded structure. Most of the coal being mined from this section is from the Pennsylvanian-aged formations. Along with the Mazon Creek fossil field in Illinois, a tremendous amount of plant fossils has been studied from this area. Landslides and acid mine drainage are two principal hazards of the area. In the past, underground mine fires have also been a threat. The Centralia Mine Fire is located within this section of the Ridge and Valley province.

=== Anthracite Valley ===
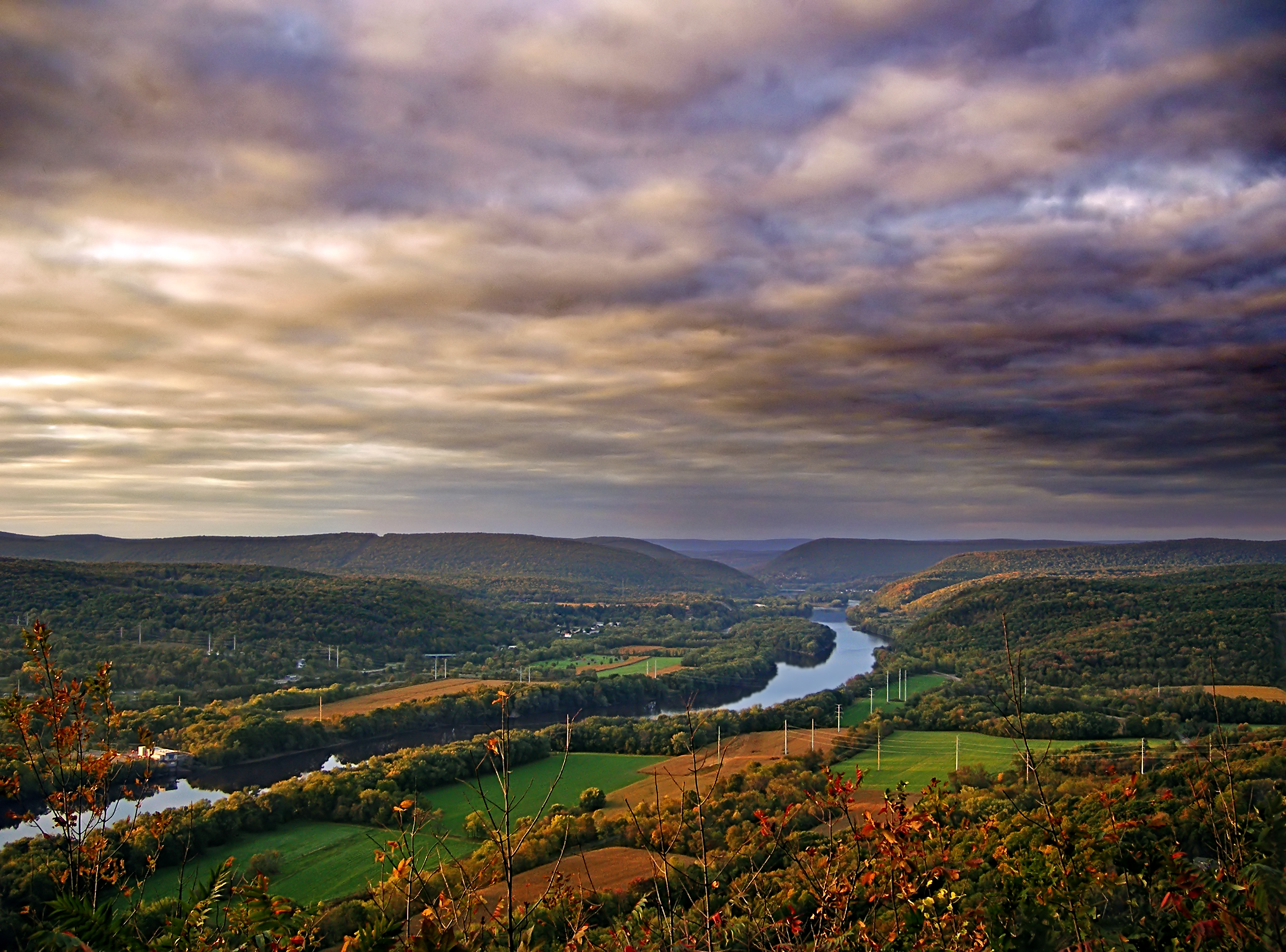
Wyoming Valley and the Susquehanna River in Luzerne County

Detached from the rest of Pennsylvania's anthracite fields, this canoe-shaped valley is also known as the Wyoming Valley and is home to the cities of Scranton and Wilkes-Barre. The largest city in the Wyoming Valley is Scranton, with a population of 77,291. The whole structure of the section is a double plunging syncline with sharp mountain ridges on either side of the valley. The ridges meet just north of Carbondale. The North Branch of the Susquehanna River and the Lackawanna River flow through this valley. Large-scale coal mining and its accompanying industry and railroads have long been abandoned.

Unlike the southern and middle anthracite fields, the anthracite valley has been recently glaciated repeatedly. This action has left many talus slopes at the base of Moosic Mountains, and the soils often contain large boulders that make excavation difficult.

=== Susquehanna Lowland ===
This region has also seen its landscape altered by glaciation and the fluvial processes of the Susquehanna River. Most of the ridges in this region are parallel to the streams that drain the area. The Susquehanna also cuts through many of the mountain ridges leading some to believe that the Susquehanna is an ancient river system that existed even before the recent continental glaciation. (Some speculate as far back as the Jurassic Period) None of the mountains in this section rise above 1,700 feet (518 m) and the river valley is as low as 250 feet (76 m).

=== Appalachian Mountain ===
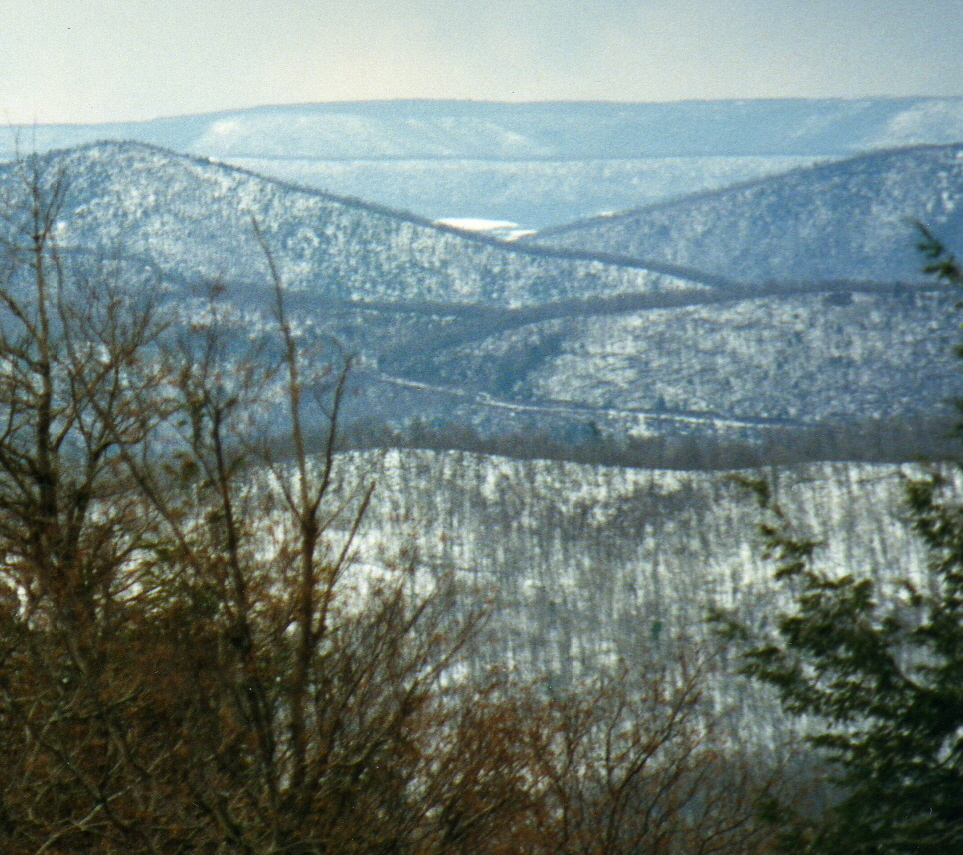
Appalachian Ridge seen from Clarks Knob

Standard long, narrow, and steep-sided ridges with narrow valleys define the state in LANDSAT photos. Many of the valleys have karst features due to carbonate rocks that reside in them. Road-building generally follows the valleys and rarely cuts across the ridges. The Pennsylvania Turnpike used tunnels cut through the ridges rather than scaling the mountain tops. Mount Nittany, Tuscarora Mountain, Jacks Mountain, Wills Mountain, and Sideling Hill are five prominent mountains in this section. The section contains Cambrian- through Pennsylvanian-aged sediments all deposited into the Appalachian Basin. During the Appalachian orogeny, these sediments became folded, faulted, and moved around. Only during the past few million years has the landscape we see today taken shape. The relatively softer or easily weathered rocks became valleys while the harder and erosion-resistant rocks became the mountain ridges. The development of this landscape continues to this day. Uplift of the province has caused rivers to cut water gaps through the mountain ranges, and has continuously presented new softer rocks in the valleys to be eroded away.

== Appalachian Plateau ==
This is by far the largest province in the state, and most of the rocks in this region are not folded and faulted and sit relatively flat. However, parts of the Appalachian Plateau appear to be mountainous due to erosion caused by streams and glaciers. In western Pennsylvania, large bituminous coal fields exist in rocks with a similar age as the rocks in the anthracite region. Many of the folds in the province are high amplitude and stretch for miles. In glaciated sections, steep canyons developed and much of the terrain have many glacial features. The drainage pattern in this area is dendritic.

=== Glaciated Pocono Plateau ===
The Pocono Mountains section of Pennsylvania is the same geologically as the Catskill Mountains of New York. The red-green-gray sedimentary rocks of the Catskill Formation are the predominant bedrock type in the Poconos. The elevation of the plateau is between 1,200 feet (366 m) and 2,300 feet (701 m) with only a few steep hills such as Camelback Mountain. Much of the rock sits in gently dipping horizontal beds, unlike the neighboring Appalachian Mountain section.

=== Glaciated Low Plateau ===
Considered a part of the Pocono Plateau, this area lies to the north of the Poconos and contains many of the same types of rock. The local relief is less than that of the Pocono region and bounded to the southeast by the Delaware River. The Big Bushkill Creek cuts a gorge through this section and has many waterfalls, especially around the area of Resica Falls Scout Reservation. Dingmans Falls and Bushkill Falls are waterfalls within the Delaware Water Gap National Recreation Area, also a part of the Endless Mountains region of Pennsylvania.

=== Glaciated High Plateau ===
Also an extension of the Catskill Mountains of New York, this section generally has higher elevations than the low plateau section as well as deeper valleys. Younger strata also outcrops in this area with a few minor coal beds. The uplands are rounded or flat along mostly broad hills. An excellent example of the escarpment that divides this section are Ricketts and Ganoga Glen located within Ricketts Glen State Park.

=== Deep Valleys ===
This section is home to the Grand Canyon of Pennsylvania and some of the most remote areas of the state. As the name implies, the streams of this area have cut deep valleys with steep sided-slopes on the surrounding ridges. Some of the gorges are at least 1,000 feet (305 m) deep. Much of the area was forested at the end of the 19th century, and much of the area is owned by the Pennsylvania Bureau of Forestry.

=== Allegheny Front ===
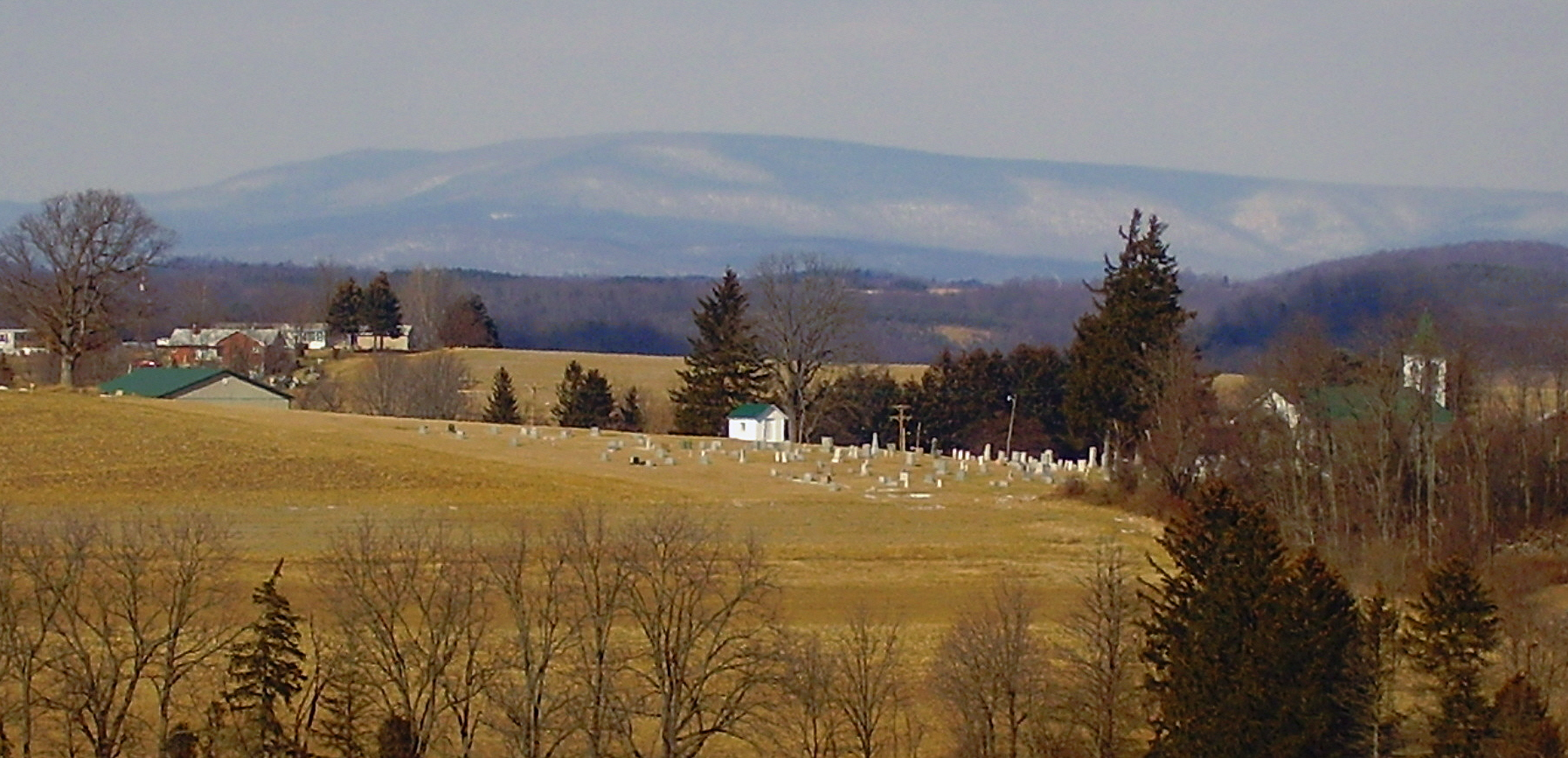
Snow covered Blue Knob Mountain (3,146 ft.) looming above the countryside

The Allegheny Front section includes the abrupt escarpment that divides the Ridge and Valley Province from the Allegheny Plateau. The region is a large broad ridge with a steep ascent from east to west and rolling hills away from the ridge. The Allegheny Front reaches its highest elevation in Pennsylvania at Blue Knob, 3,136 feet (956 m), an unusual bulge along this symmetrical ridgeline. Streams that cut into the ridge are often shallow and steep.

=== Allegheny Mountain ===
This section includes Pennsylvania's highest point, Mount Davis, which stands at 3,213 feet (979 m) above sea level. Many of the mountains are long and broad with relatively shallow and broad valleys. Unlike the Appalachian Mountain section, the streams of this area have not cut deep and well defined valleys into the earth. Much of the drainage pattern is dendritic with a little trellis where erosion resistant rocks have created higher and more well defined ridges. Elevations increase to the south, and Mt. Davis resides only 4.5 miles (7 km) from the Maryland border. A few of the ridge tops contain some low-volatile bituminous coal fields including the Broad Top field. This region is also home to two national stories: the Quecreek Mine Rescue and the crash of United Airlines Flight 93.

=== Waynesburg Hills ===
Located in the southwest corner of the state, the Waynesburg hills are another major coal-producing area for the state. Much of the 64.4 billion tons of bituminous coal that is remaining in the state resides under these hills in near horizontal beds. The hills are narrow and steep-sided, with some deeper valleys.

=== Pittsburgh Low Plateau ===
Another section that is a significant coal producer. It is similar to the Waynesburg hills section except for higher local relief and deeper valleys. Landslides and mine subsidence are common hazards.

=== High Plateau ===
This section consists of high, broad, and flat uplands cut by sharp and shallow river valleys. Much of this area was not covered by the Late Wisconsinan glacier, but there is evidence of pre-Wisconsinan glaciers in the area. Along with the Endless Mountains, it is one of the most remote places in the eastern United States.

=== Northwestern Glaciated Plateau ===
This section has been influenced by glaciers and many of the valleys cut into the bedrock trend northwestward- in the direction of the retreating glaciers. There are many signs of glaciers including kames, eskers, kettles, and moraines. This section is home to Pennsylvania's largest natural lake, Conneaut Lake as well as one of the longest eskers in the state, West Liberty Esker. Some of the drainage patterns have shifted and only a few of the streams flow into Lake Erie.

== Central Lowlands ==
Along with the Coastal Plain Province, the smallest province in the state, the central lowlands are a part of the Great Lakes area and exist along a glacial escapement adjacent to Lake Erie.

== Geologic features ==
The following is a list of Pennsylvania geologic features noted for their beauty and/or uniqueness.

=== Periglacial ===
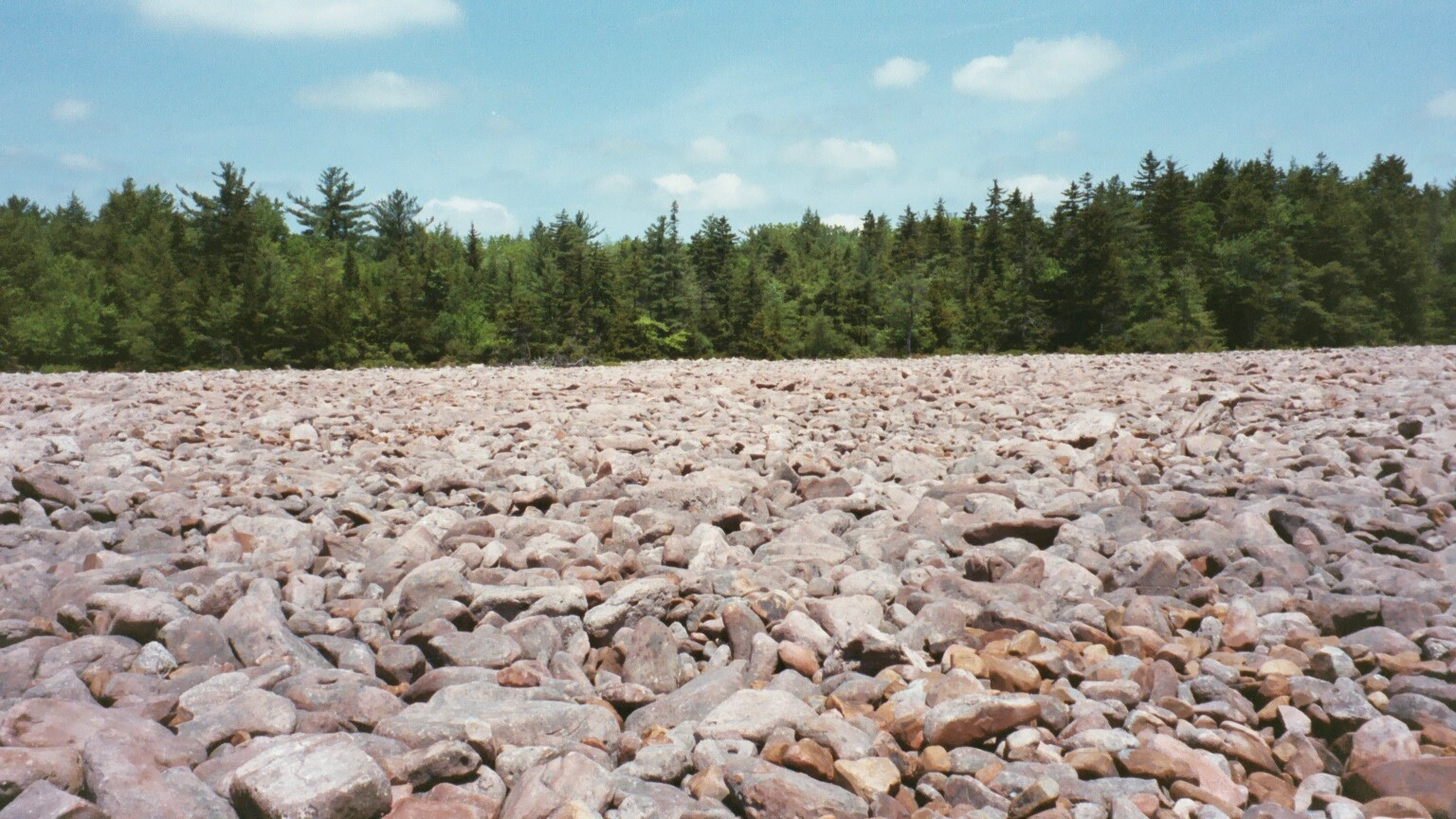
Boulder Field at Hickory Run State Park

- Hickory Run State Park
- Mount Davis

=== Glacial ===
- Archbald Pothole
- Grand Canyon of Pennsylvania
- McConnells Mill State Park
- Moraine State Park
- Presque Isle
- Promised Land State Park
- Ricketts Glen State Park
- Worlds End State Park

=== Structural ===
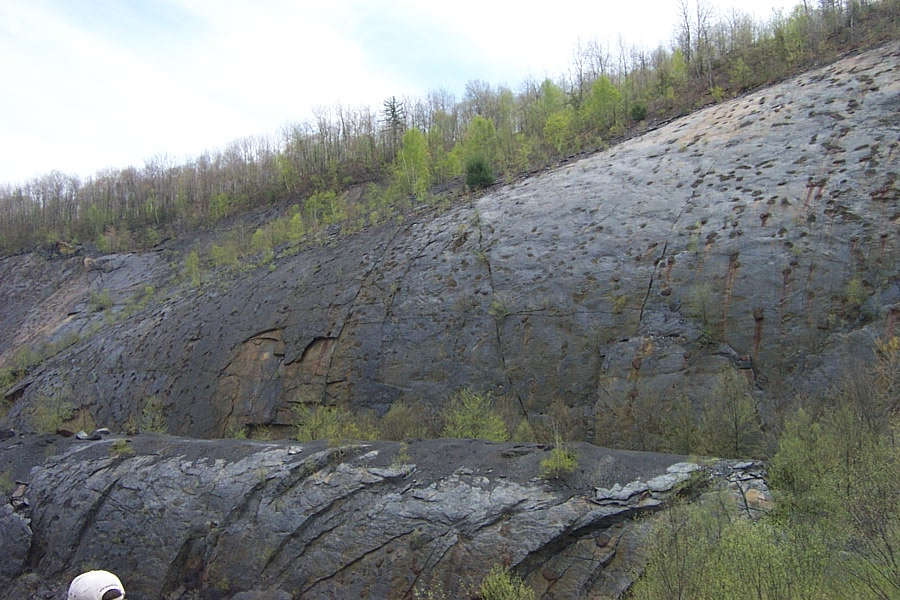
upright=1.1Bear Valley Strip Mine, southwest of Shamokin in the Coal Region

- Bear Valley Strip Mine
- Chickies Rock
- Delaware Water Gap
- Pole Steeple
- Governor Stable
- Ringing Rocks
- The Pinnacle

== Rock formations ==
Pennsylvania has been updating its base geologic map last printed in 1980. New research has shifted the names of several formations and promoted or demoted many different sequences on the stratigraphic chart.
