= Dingmans Ferry, Pennsylvania =

Unincorporated community in Pennsylvania, U.S.

Coordinates: 41°13′12″N 74°52′17″W

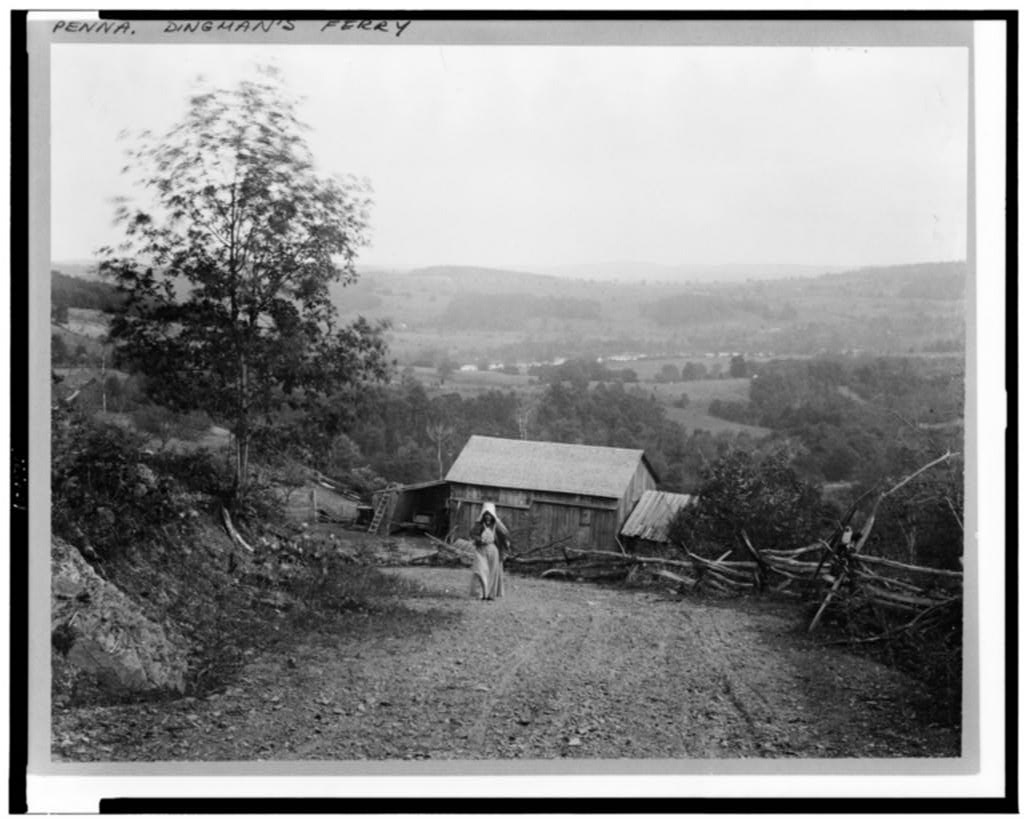
A woman walks up a hill in Dingmans Ferry, 1897

Dingmans Ferry is an unincorporated community in Delaware Township, Pike County, Pennsylvania, United States. As of 2014, it had a population of approximately 7,477 people. It was originally sited on the Delaware River, in an area now included in the Delaware Water Gap National Recreation Area. When the Corps of Engineers acquired the land by eminent domain in the mid-twentieth century for the creation of the proposed Tocks Island Dam project, it relocated the community further up the hill.

Local objections to the dam and purchasing of land willingly or by eminent domain had delayed the project for years, but preparations ended for certain when it was learned that the proposed dam site was on a fault line. When the dam project was cancelled, the National Park Service was tasked with managing the property for the Corps so far as public use was concerned. The land purchased by the Corps was converted to the Delaware National Recreation Area.

Nearby attractions include Factory Falls, Fulmer Falls, and Deer Leap Falls in Childs Recreation Area and Silverthread Falls and Dingmans Falls, all on Dingmans Creek. Dingmans Ferry is located at 41°13'North, 74°52'West.

Dingmans Ferry is now the name of the post office (ZIP Code 18328) that serves Delaware and Porter townships. The post office is located within the borders of Delaware Township. Delaware Township is governed by a Board of Supervisors; there is no mayor of Dingmans Ferry. The community is served by area codes 570 and 272.

The Dingmans Ferry Bridge is the last privately owned toll bridge on the Delaware River, and one of the few remaining in the country.

The Dingman's Ferry Dutch Reformed Church was added to the National Register of Historic Places in 1979. It was converted to a residence in 1957 but was not altered on the exterior, which had wooden columns modelled after Roman marble ones.

Dingman-Delaware Primary, Elementary and Middle Schools are located in the area.

== Communities ==
Birchwood Lake Estates, New Marcel Lake Estates, Old Marcel Lake, Pocono Mountain Water Forest, Pocono Mountain Lake Forest, and Pocono mountain lake estates Wild Acres.

== Notable people ==
- Andrew P. Schafer Jr., US Army major general
