= Mount Gilead A.M.E. Church =

Church in Pennsylvania, USA

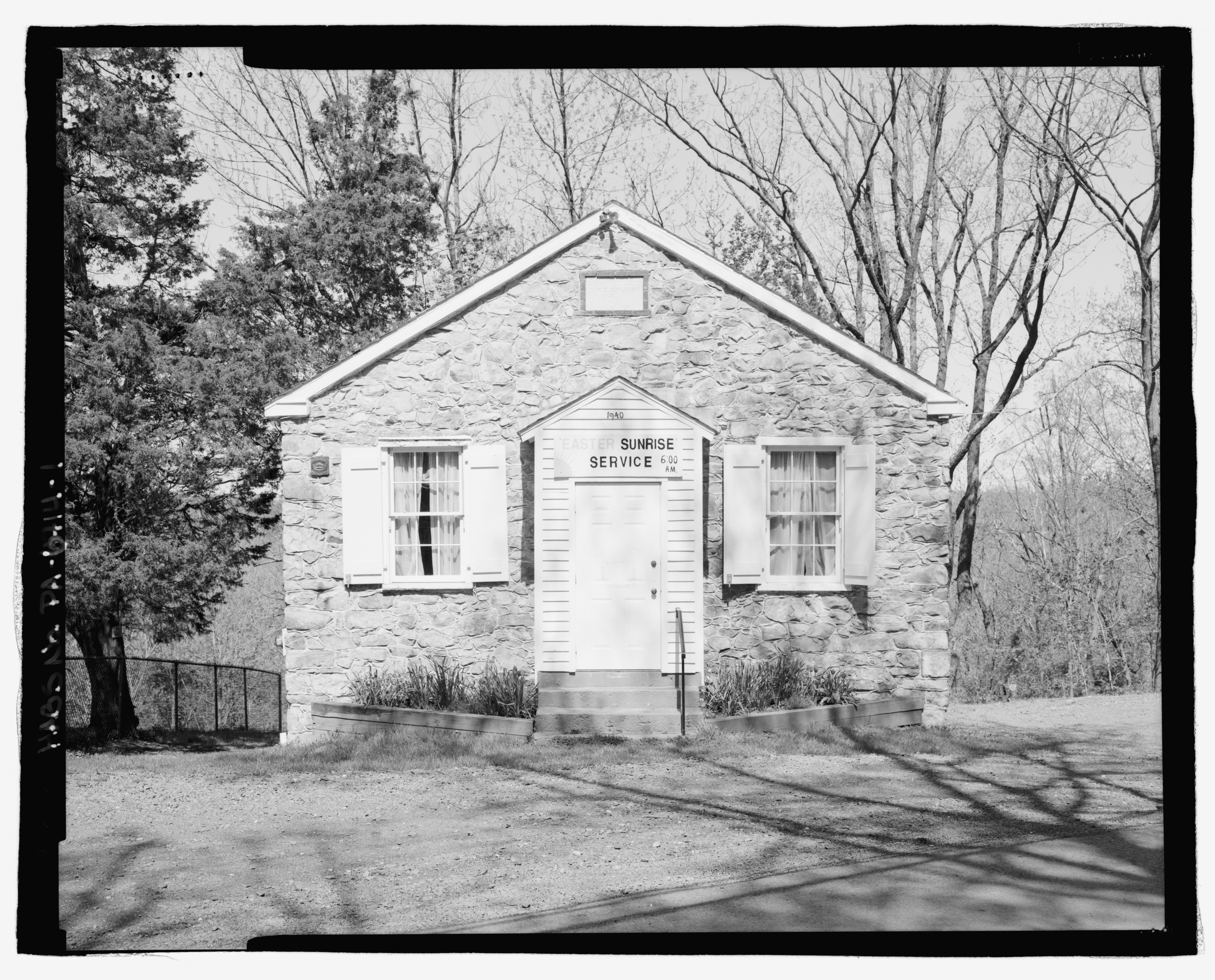

- Location within Pennsylvania
- 40°19′22.3″N 75°01′59.9″W
- Location: 1940 Holicong Road, Buckingham Township, Bucks County, Pennsylvania, USA

History
- Built: 1852

Mount Gilead African Methodist Episcopal Church is a historic black church located atop Buckingham Mountain, near Holicong, Buckingham Township, Bucks County, Pennsylvania.

== History ==
The congregation was founded in 1822 by fifteen free and escaped enslaved Africans, and it is thought to be the second-oldest A.M.E. congregation in Bucks County. The first church building was a log chapel, built in 1834. Title to the church property was in the name of the minister, Daniel Yeomans, when he deeded it to the congregation in 1843. The present stone church was built in 1852. The sloped site allowed for a single-room, 20-by-30-foot sanctuary above and a Sunday school room below.

Tradition holds that the community was a station on the Underground Railroad, the last station before fugitive slaves crossed the Delaware River into New Jersey. The surrounding landowners were white Quaker abolitionists, who tolerated the escaped slaves' building cabins on Buckingham Mountain. Selling or giving the land to the squatters would have been a direct violation of the Fugitive Slave Act of 1793, which made it a federal crime to assist an escaped slave. The mountain's isolation and lookout views in all directions seemed to provide residents with some degree of protection from slave-catchers. At the community's height, reportedly a hundred African Americans lived on the mountain.

Fugitive slave Benjamin "Big Ben" Jones (ca. 1800–1875) was a massive man – reportedly 6-feet 10 1/2-inches tall – who escaped from Maryland and settled on Buckingham Mountain around 1833. In March 1844, his master and four slave-catchers appeared and captured Jones following a bloody struggle. They transported him to Philadelphia, and placed him on a ship to Baltimore, Maryland, where he was held in the notorious Hope Slatter slave prison, awaiting transfer to New Orleans for sale. A group of Buckingham and Philadelphia Quakers raised the $700 (equal to $24,187 today) to buy him out of slavery. He returned to the mountain, where he married a woman named Sarah Johnson. He lived the last decade of his life at the Bucks County Almshouse, dying there in 1875.

The graveyard contains 243 marked graves and an unknown number of unmarked ones. Among the burials are a number of the church's ministers, Civil War veterans of the United States Colored Troops, and William E. Teat (1914–2001), a baseball player from the Negro leagues.

Regular services were held at the church into the early 20th century. For generations the property was maintained by descendants of the congregation, and the church building continued to be used for weddings, funerals, and special services. Following the death of caretaker John Reinhardt in 2014, a community group formed to take over the care of the church, renaming it Mount Gilead Community Church.

The North Star, an independent film loosely based on "Big Ben" Jones's life, debuted in 2015. A circa-1870 photograph of Jones, the only known image of him, appears on the film's poster. Some of the scenes were filmed at the church.

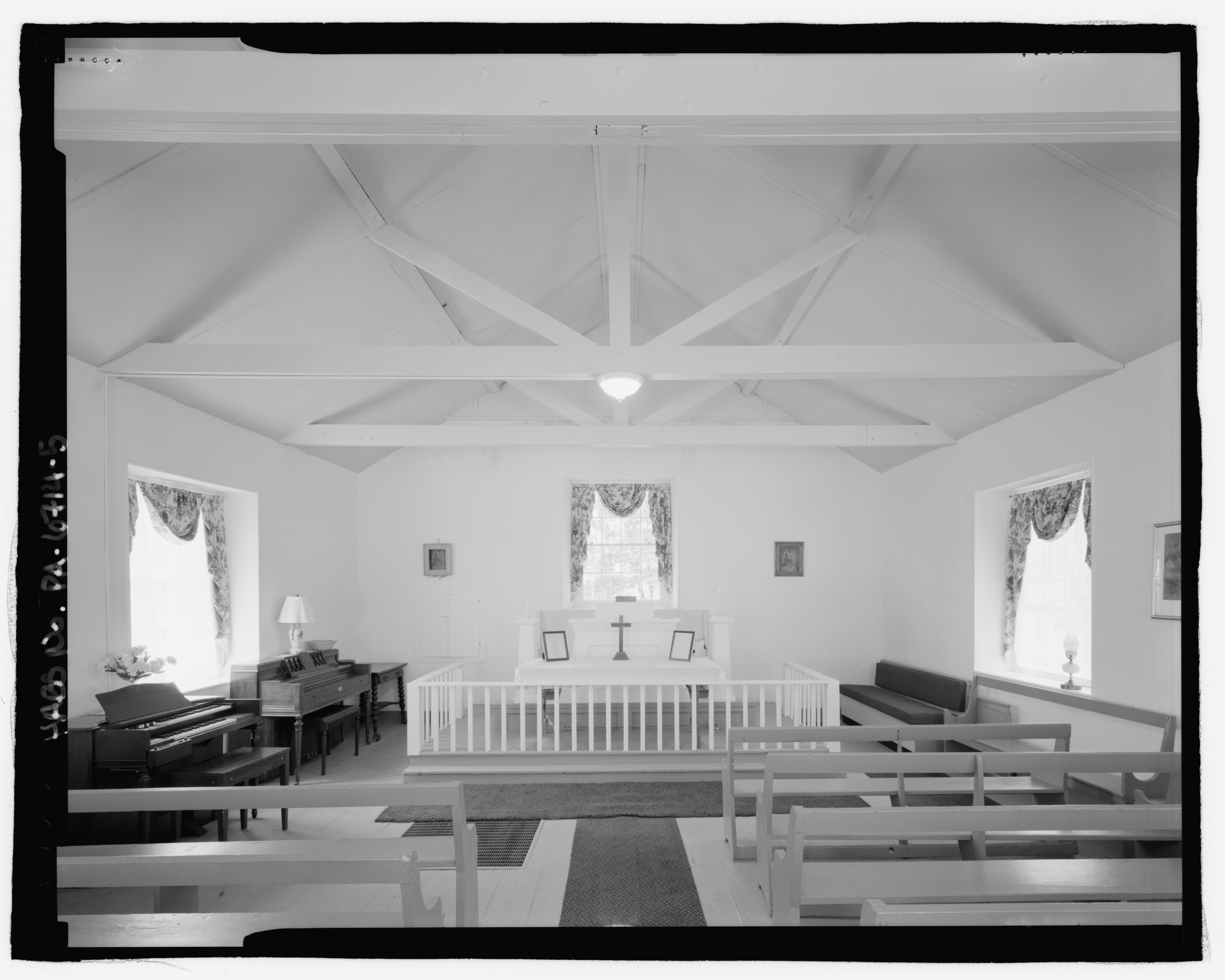
Interior.

Side and rear elevations.

== Sources ==
- William Watts Hart Davis, History of Bucks County, Pennsylvania, Volume 2, (Lewis Publishing Company, 1905).
- Stanley Harrold, Border War: Fighting over Slavery before the Civil War, (University of North Carolina Press, 2010). ISBN 9780807899557
- J. Blaine Hudson, "Mount Gilead AME Church (Buckingham Mountain, Pennsylvania)," Encyclopedia of the Underground Railroad, (McFarland, 2006). ISBN 9780786424597
- Edward Hicks Magill, When Men Were Sold: The Underground Railroad in Bucks County, Pa., (Bucks County Historical Society, 1898).
- Meagan Ratini, M.A., Final rest at the hilltop sanctuary: The community of Mount Gilead AME Church, masters thesis, University of Massachusetts Boston, 2014. ISBN 9781321246216
