= George W. Childs Recreation Site =

Former Pennsylvania state park

Coordinates: 41.235°N 74.915°W

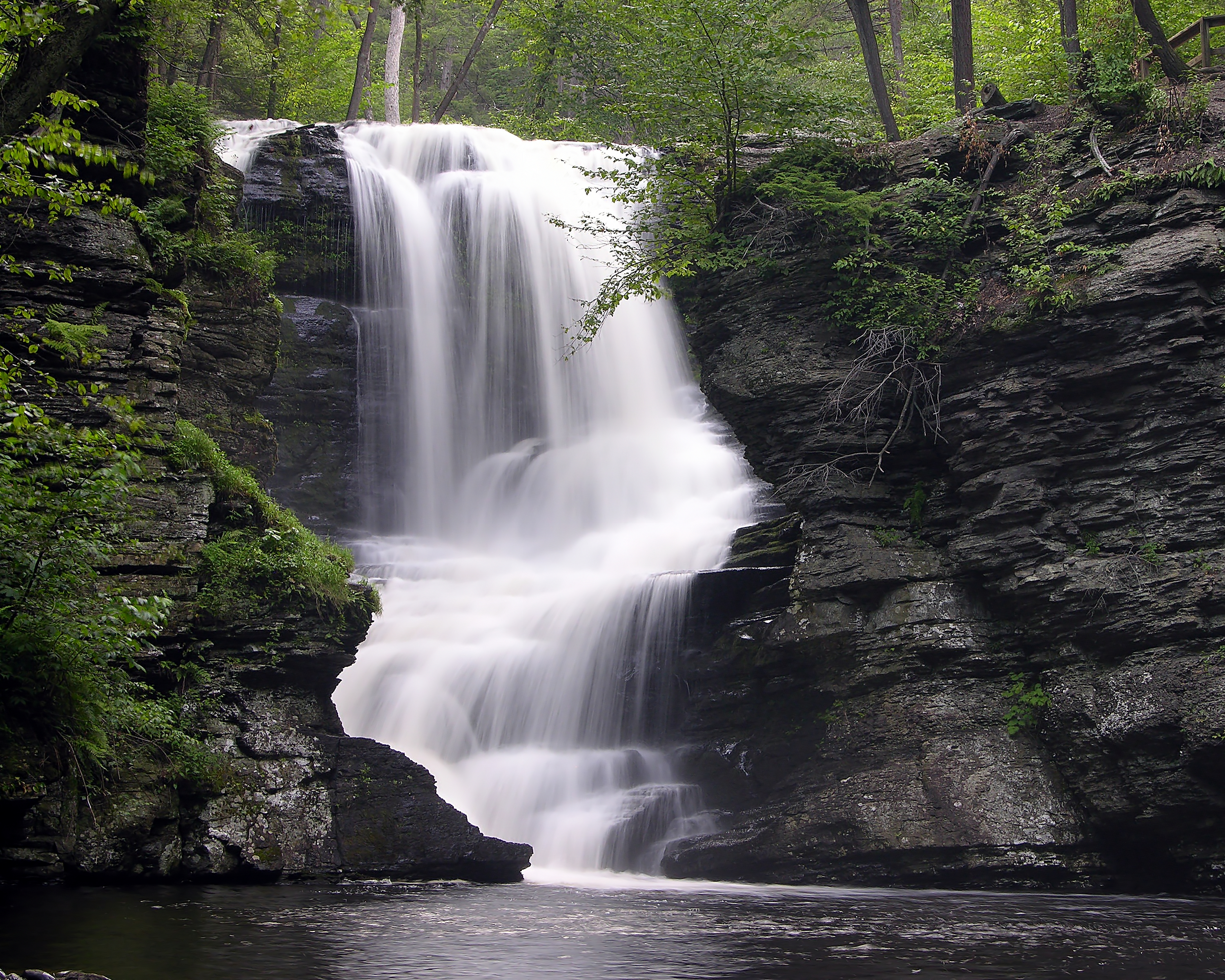
Fulmer Falls waterfall

The George W. Childs Recreation Site is a former Pennsylvania state park that is the site of a number of cascade waterfalls along Dingmans Creek; it has been part of the Delaware Water Gap National Recreation Area since 1983. It is located in Dingmans Ferry in Delaware Township, Pike County, Pennsylvania and is named for the late newspaper publisher George William Childs, whose widow deeded the land to the Commonwealth of Pennsylvania in 1912. The site contains three main waterfalls: Factory Falls, Fulmer Falls and Deer Leap Falls and is a few miles upstream from Dingmans Falls and Silverthread Falls.

The pools below the waterfalls were once a popular spot for swimming during its ownership by the Pennsylvania Bureau of State Parks. However, that activity had been banned upon transfer of ownership to the National Park Service.

== History ==
In 1892, Philadelphia newspaper publisher George William Childs purchased land in Dingmans Ferry, Pennsylvania with the intent of creating a recreation space and tourist destination for the general public. Included in the purchase was the area known as Fulmer Falls. The Pike County Dispatch described Childs' recreation spot as "a colossal pleasure ground, free to all comers" and "a charmed spot." A popular vacation destination by 1897, The Philadelphia Inquirer reported that, "The Factory Falls, Fulmer Falls, High Falls and Silver Thread Falls far surpass any in the Catskills."

In 1912, his widow donated one hundred and fifty-five acres of her husband's land purchase to the Commonwealth of Pennsylvania, which established a state recreation area and named it in her husband's honor as the George W. Childs State Park. In 1983, that park became part of the Delaware Water Gap National Recreation Area.

In 2018, the park was closed due to damage caused by two winter storms, Quinn and Riley. Restoration work involving trail upgrades, the removal of downed trees and the repair of damaged railings and posts was undertaken by the U.S. National Park Service in September 2023 with the park's reopening estimated to take place in spring 2024.

The site is also host to the ruins of Joseph Brooks' 19th century woolen mill. In the 1820s Joseph Brooks, a Welshman who had immigrated to Philadelphia, built a woolen mill of stone, 3½ stories high. He employed about 80 workers.

His sheep, though, were devoured by wolves or died from eating poisonous Sheep Laurel. Supplies, operatives, and materials such as expensive raw wool, had to be brought in from Philadelphia, and the finished products shipped down to this city by wagons, a trip which took 10 days. Brooks died in 1832 and the mill was abandoned; the ruins are still visible.

== Closures ==
From October 2010 to May 2013 the National Park Service (NPS) began a $2.5 million rehabilitation project for much-needed repairs to trails, bridges, parking areas, and historic structures, and implemented measures to help maintain and preserve the forest and streamside vegetation. The project was in the planning stage for several years; public meetings were held in June 2006 and an Environmental Assessment was released for public review in May 2008. After nearly 3 years of closure to the public, the park reopened reopening in May 2013 with accessible trails and picnic sites that met Americans with Disabilities Act (ADA) standards.

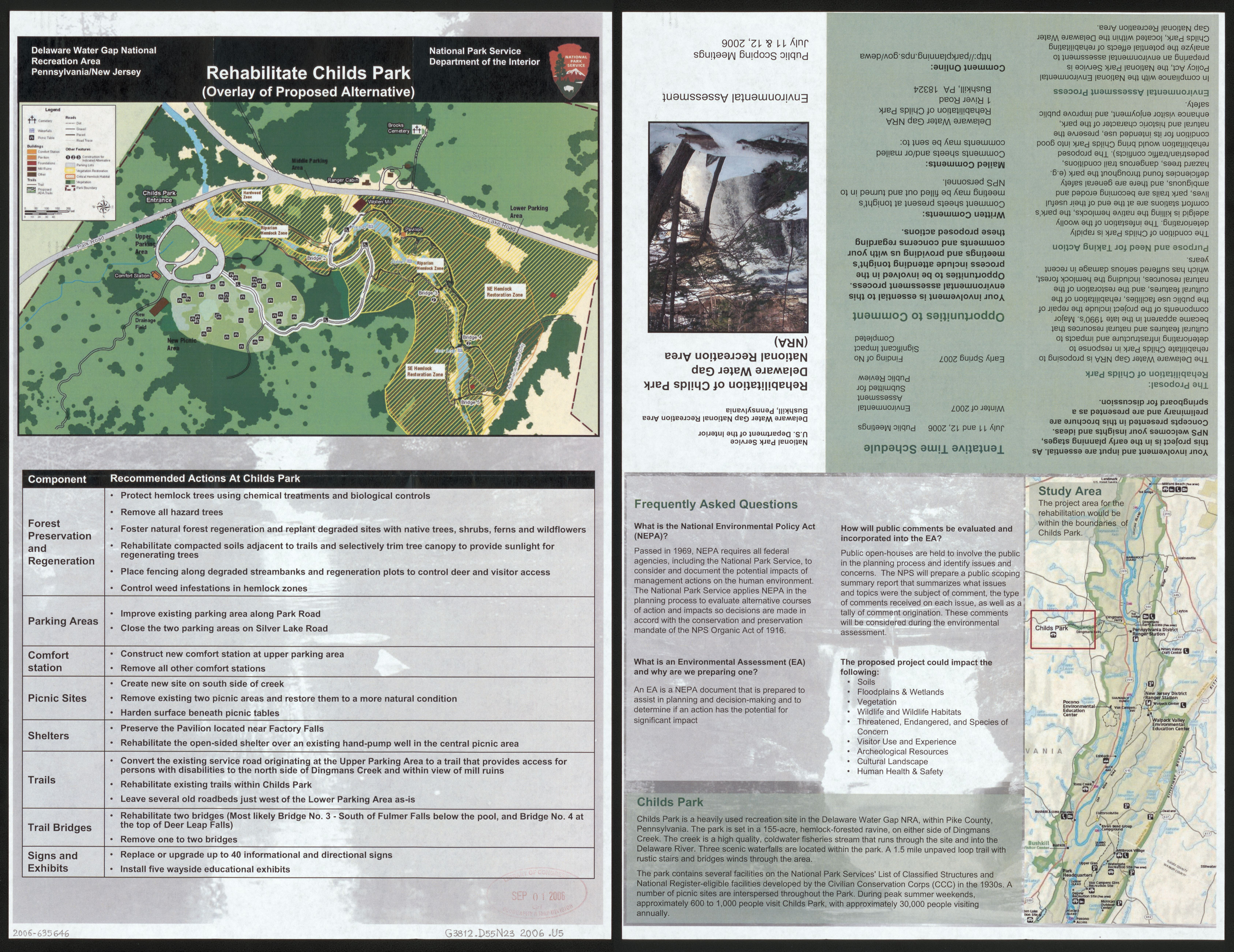
Rehabilitation of Childs Park, Delaware Water Gap National Recreation Area (NRA) Environmental Assessment summary

In March 2018 two nor'easters, Winter Storm Riley (March 2) and Winter Storm Quinn (March 7), struck the United States eastern seaboard resulting in damage that caused the park to close indefinitely. In October 2022 the NPS announced that a nearly $3 million contract for a final phase of restoration and construction work had been awarded to Puyenpa services, LLC from Gaithersburg, Maryland. This phase of repairs included surveying and project layout, vegetation clearing and stump/root removal for trail work, and procurement of supplies and materials. No work would take place during the winter months and construction was planned to resume in the spring of 2023. On May 30, 2023 the NPS announced the final stage of restoration was set to start with work to continue through the fall and into early winter. The park re-opened in October 2024.
