= Resica Falls Scout Reservation =

Summer camp in Pennsylvania, United States

Coordinates: 41°06′41″N 75°05′41″W

- Owner: Cradle of Liberty Council
- Location: East Stroudsburg, Pennsylvania
- Country: United States
- Founded: 1957
- Website resicafalls.org

Resica Falls Scout Reservation is a camp in East Stroudsburg, Pennsylvania operated by the Cradle of Liberty Council of the Scouting America.

== History ==
In 1955 the Philadelphia and Valley Forge Councils purchased the property jointly. Dedicated in April 1956, the camp opened in 1957 and was operated by both councils until 1965, when Valley Forge Council bought out the Philadelphia Council's interest. Originally, the reservation was to consist of six camps, each holding two hundred and fifty boys. Three camps—Camp Big Springs, Camp Great Bend and Camp Firestone—were built on the reservation.

The property is now owned by the Cradle of Liberty Council. Camp Firestone and most of Camp Great Bend are currently closed because of lack of campers.

In recent years, the Big Springs Camp has grown to encompass most of the old Great Bend Camp. This has led to many capital improvements throughout the reservation, most notably the addition of the Sir John Templeton Dining Hall, and the Thomas Richards Arena. The Camp Great Bend dining hall has since become a part of Big Springs as the STEM center.

== Geography ==
Big Bushkill Creek runs through the camp and also runs into neighbor camps. The camp is built around, and gets its name from the 45-foot waterfall on the property.

The camp is used by hunters and fishermen with the permission of the scouts. It is known among fisherman, especially fly fisherman. During the fall fishing season, the camp rents cabins to fishermen looking to fish along the Bushkill Creek. Even though there are certain restrictions, fisherman still fish along the eponymous falls.

== Conservation ==
In February 2006, Natural Lands completed a conservation easement on the reservation on behalf of Middle Smithfield Township. The Pennsylvania DNCR contributed $900,000 in grants to the project. The easement restricts development on the property and ensures that an additional 1,028 acres (4.16 km^{2}) of valuable natural open space will be permanently preserved.

== Gallery ==
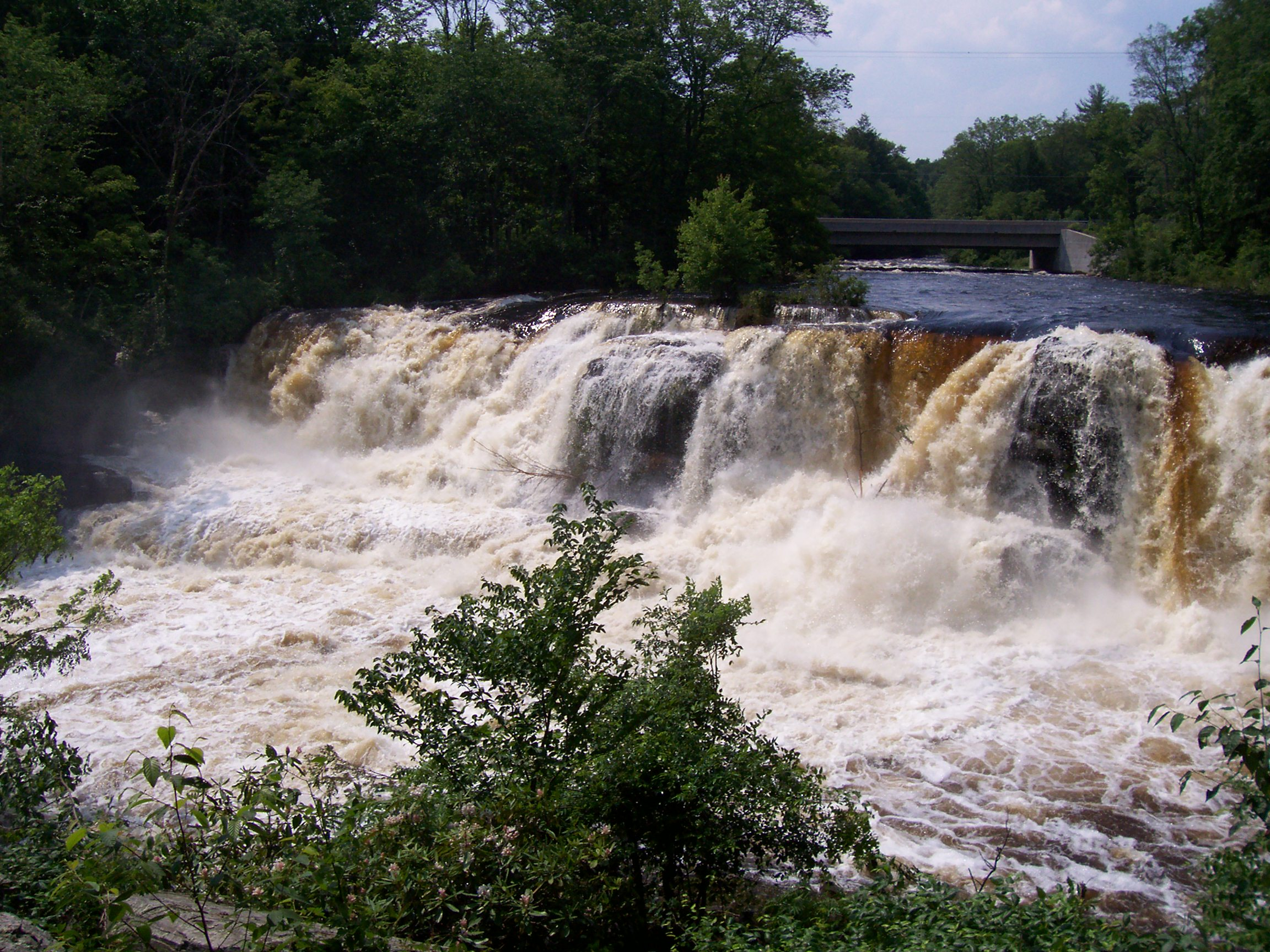
The falls

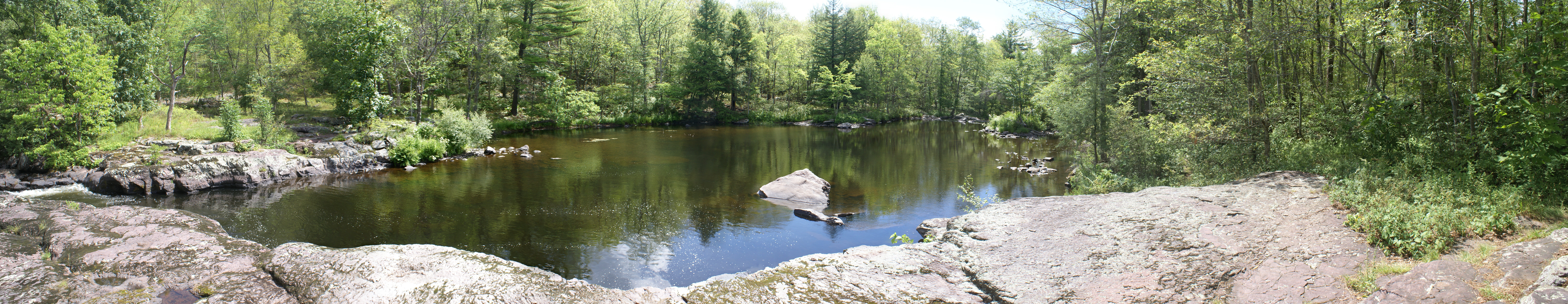
Cool Dip a common swimming hole at Resica

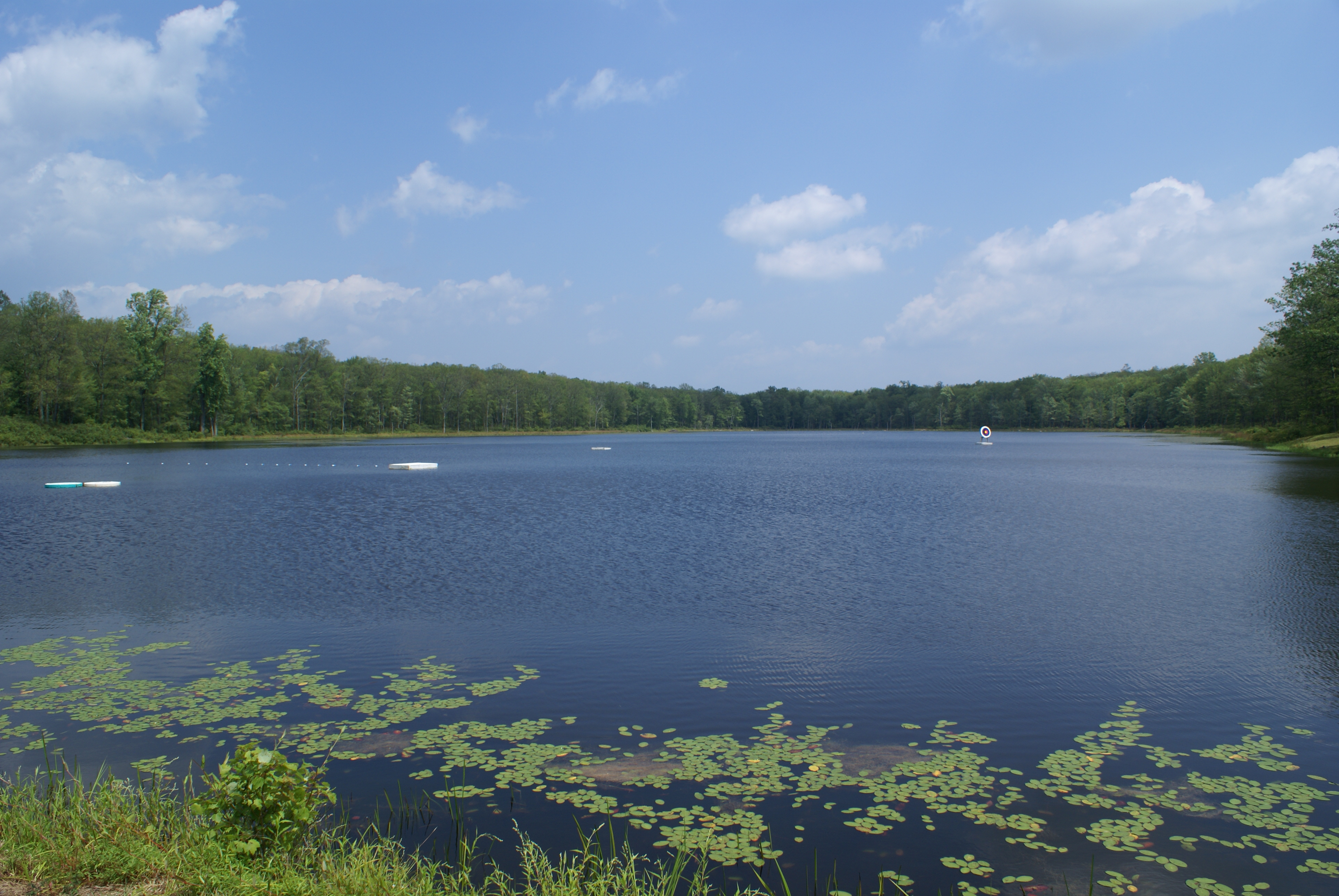
Lake Roger at Resica Falls

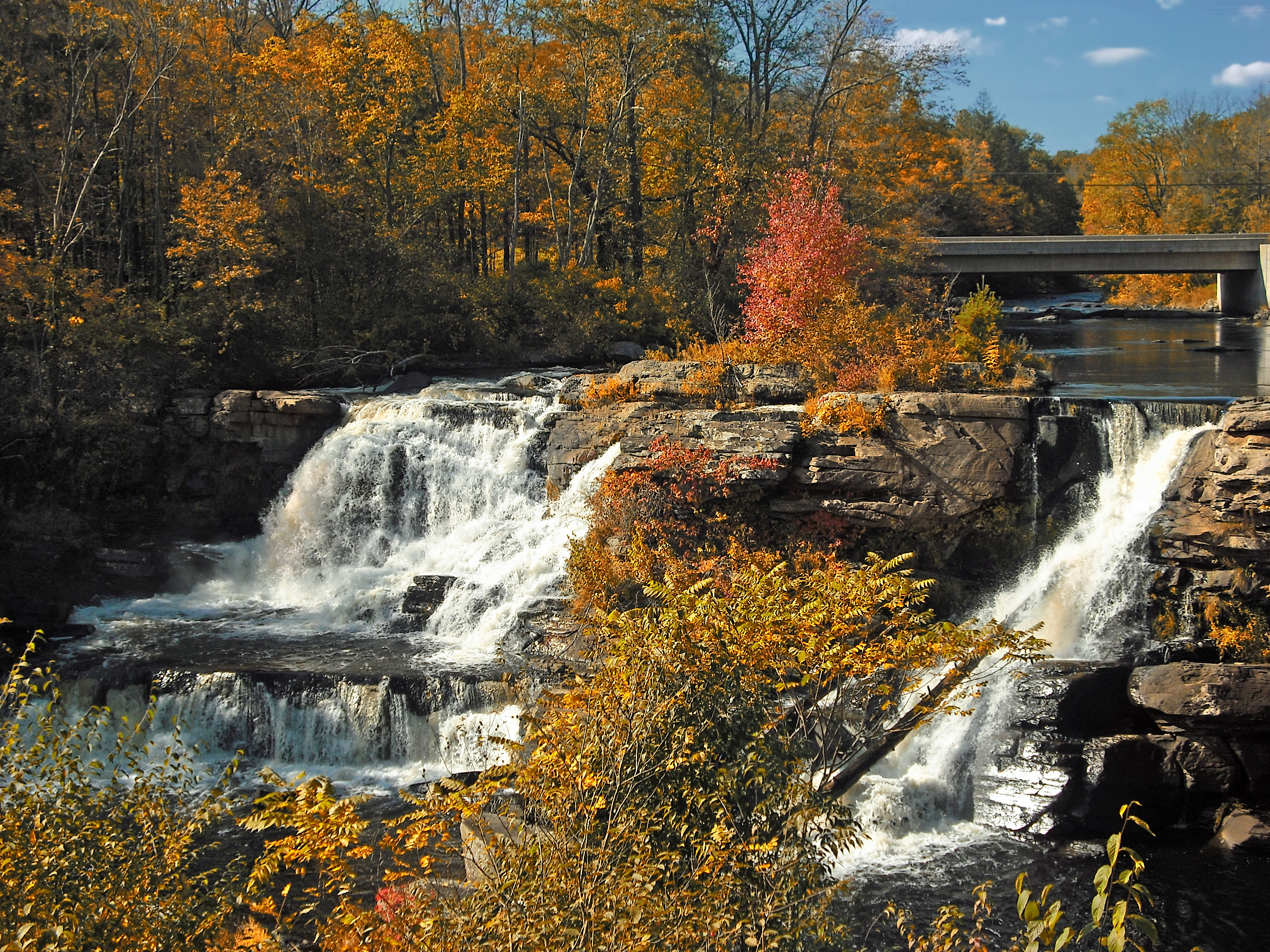
The Resica Falls

== See also ==
- Scouting in Pennsylvania
