= Bushkill Falls =

Series of eight privately owned waterfalls in Lehman Township, Pennsylvania

Coordinates: 41.1174°N 75.01°W

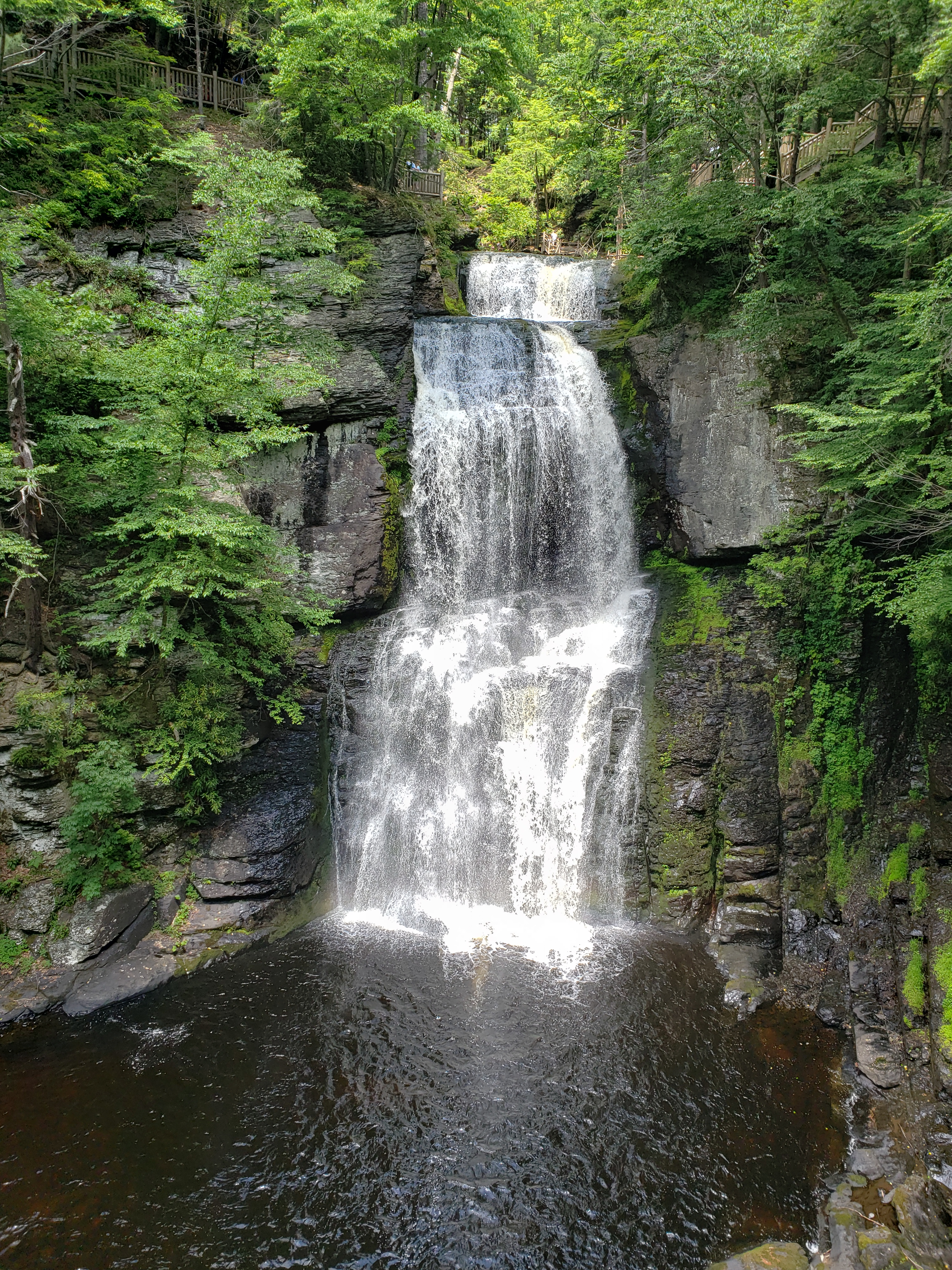
Main waterfall at Bushkill Falls, 2020

Bushkill Falls is a series of eight privately owned waterfalls, the tallest of which cascades over 100 feet (30 m), located in Lehman Township, Pennsylvania in the Pocono Mountains. Water of the Little Bush Kill and Pond Run Creek descends the mountain, toward the Delaware River, forming Bushkill Falls, Bridal Veil Falls, Bridesmaid Falls, Laurel Glen Falls, Pennell Falls, and three additional, unnamed falls.

Bushkill Falls is a popular spot for hiking and birdwatching. The area features a variety of trails and bridges that vary in length and difficulty.

== Notes ==
Bushkill Falls is nicknamed "Niagara Falls of Pennsylvania." It was opened to the public in 1904 by Charles E. Peters. Aramark ran the Park at the behest of the C.E.Peters Estate from 1995 until 2023. In 2023, it purchased Bushkill Falls. It is now part of the conglomerate called Aramark Destinations.

There is an admission fee for the park of $22.00 for adults, $20.00 for seniors, and $12.00 for children ages 4–10 per day.

The main falls, named Bushkill Falls, and the main canyon area are accessible via boardwalk and stairs. Outside of the main canyon area the trails are mostly dirt and stone, with boardwalks and bridges in certain areas.

On August 13, 2011, one person died after falling 150 feet (46 m) into the falls. Two teenage boys walked off marked trails and one of the boys lost his footing and fell into the falls. He was pronounced dead on the scene.

In the mid-1880s, the Swiss-born American artist Adolfo Müller-Ury (1862–1947) painted a large canvas depicting the major torrent of the Bushkill Falls. It was donated to the Von der Heydt Museum, Wuppertal, by Erich Hahne in 1958.

== See also ==
- List of waterfalls
- Dingmans Falls
- Silverthread Falls
