= Governor Stable =

Geologic formation in Pennsylvania, United States

Coordinates: 40.130787°N 76.693582°W

Governor Stable is a notable geologic formation in northern Lancaster County, Pennsylvania. Scattered along the northern bank of a small drainage are a high number of large diabase boulders. Governor Stable is privately owned. Friends of Governor Stable administers a recreational lease on the property, allowing organization members access to the property for bouldering.
