= Big Bushkill Creek =

Creek in Pennsylvania, United States

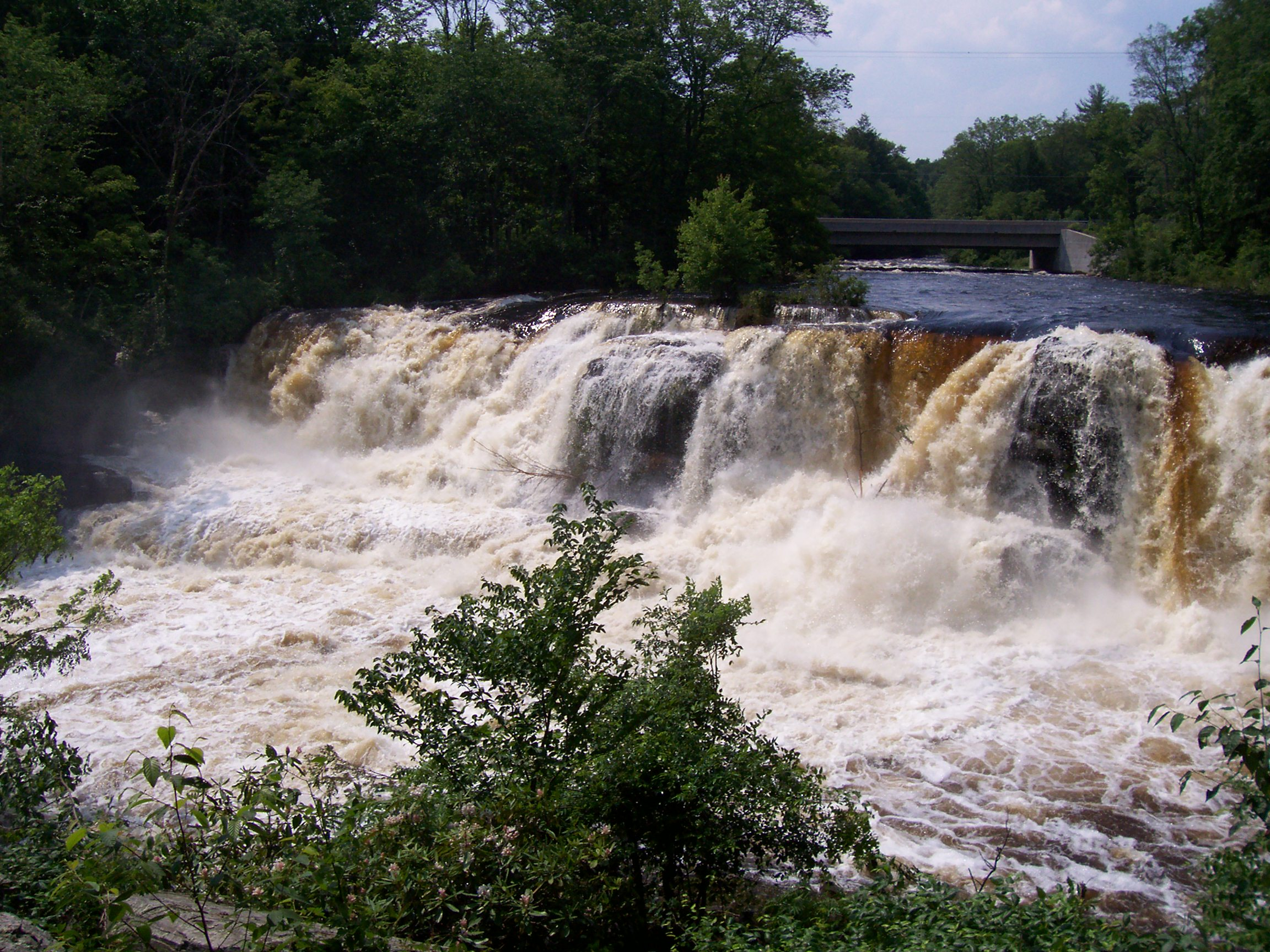
Resica Falls

Big Bushkill Creek (Bush Kill on federal maps) is a 30.1-mile-long (48.4 km) tributary of the Delaware River in the Pocono Mountains region of Northeastern Pennsylvania.

It originates from Pecks Pond 41.2808°N 75.0872°W in Pike County. It flows south, entering Pickerel Lake and then into Beaver Run Pond. Most of the stream travels through Delaware State Forest before entering Monroe County. It is a prominent feature of Resica Falls Scout Reservation.

Bush Kill joins the Delaware River at the village of Bushkill.

== Tributaries ==
There are at least five unnamed tributaries to the Bush Kill; named tributaries include:

- Little Bush Kill
- Sand Hill Creek
- Saw Creek
- Spring Run
- Pennel Run
- Dancing Ridge Run
- Utt Run
- High Swamp Run
- Sixteen Mile Run
- Brights Creek
- Beaver Run
- Middle Branch Bush Kill
- Spruce Run

== See also ==
- Bushkill Falls
- List of Pennsylvania rivers
