= Buckingham Mountain =

Mountain in Pennsylvania, United States

Coordinates: 40°18′57″N 75°02′28″W

Highest point
- Elevation: 520 ft (160 m)

Geography
- Location: Bucks County, Pennsylvania, U.S.
- Parent range: Piedmont Plateau

Buckingham Mountain (Lenape: Pepacating) is located in Buckingham Township in Central Bucks County, Pennsylvania, in the United States. It is the second most elevated land in all of Bucks County at 520 feet.

== History ==
On top of Buckingham Mountain stands the Mount Gilead African Methodist Episcopal Church, built in 1835, and rebuilt in 1852 out of stone. It was founded by runaway slaves and was considered to be one of the more prominent refuges for runaway slaves in Southeastern Pennsylvania.
