= List of waterfalls in the Delaware Water Gap =

Map of Delaware Water Gap

There are many waterfalls in the Delaware Water Gap National Recreation Area, a national recreation area managed by the National Park Service in New Jersey and Pennsylvania.

== List ==
=== Buttermilk Falls ===
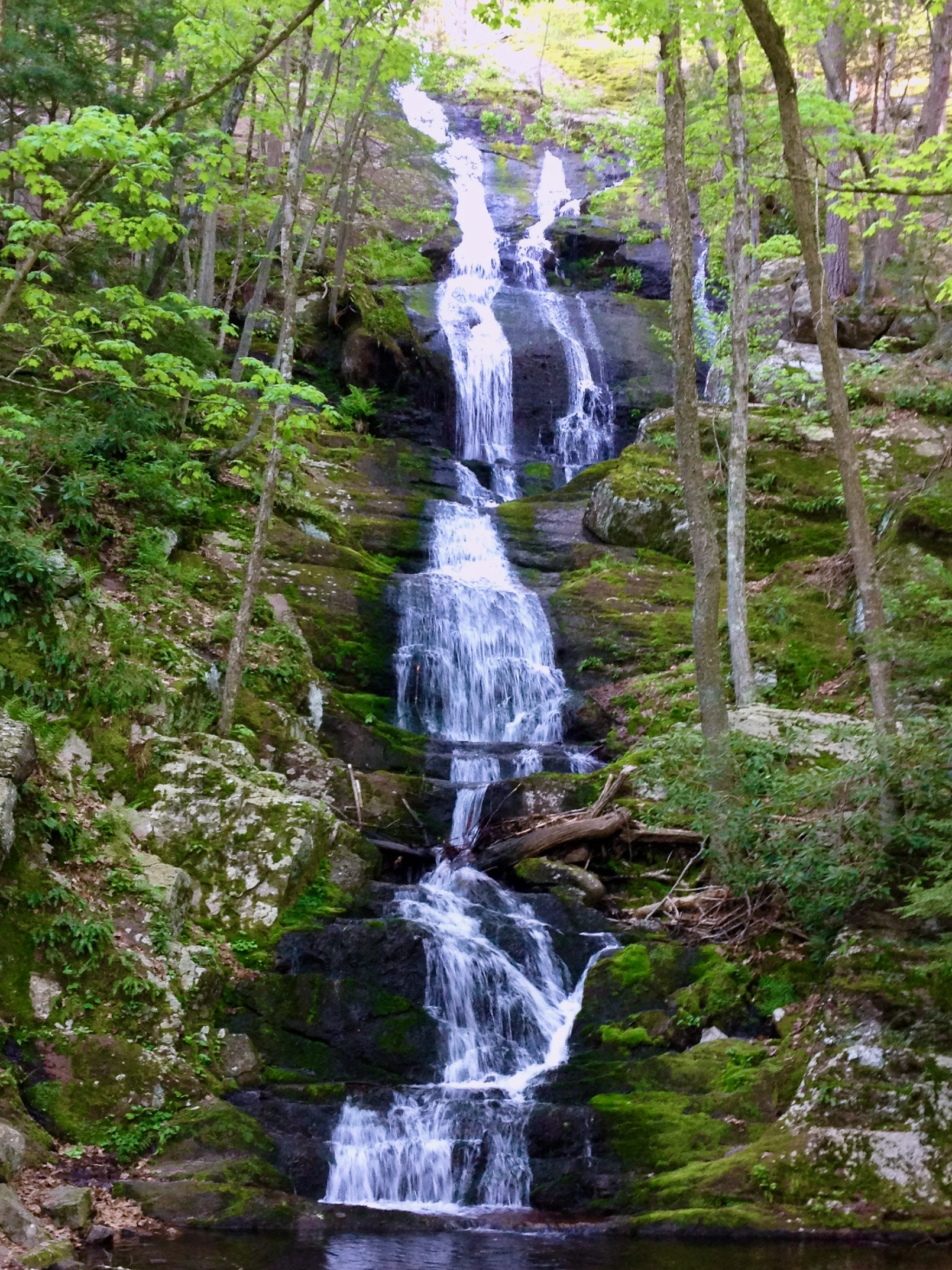
Buttermilk Falls

Buttermilk Falls is one of the tallest waterfalls of New Jersey. A dirt road (closed to vehicles in the winter) goes past its base. A series of steps lead to observation platforms further up the waterfall, which is nearly 100 feet (30 m) high. A trail continues eastward from the topmost platform, reaching the Appalachian Trail, about 1,100 feet (340 m) higher in elevation than the base of the falls, in about 1.4 miles (2.3 km). The waterfall is near the north end of the Delaware Water Gap National Recreation Area in New Jersey.

=== Dingmans Falls ===
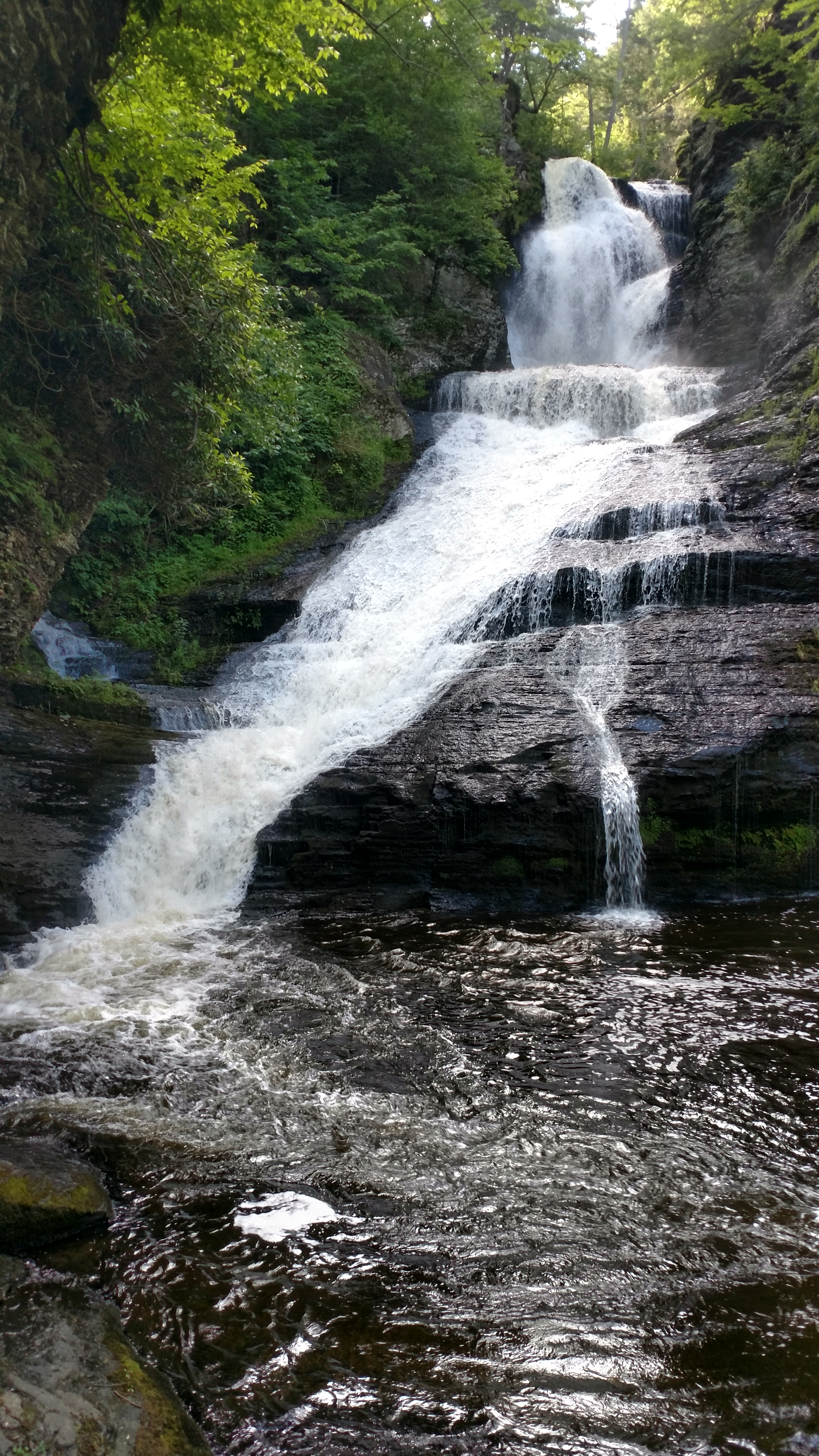
Dingmans Falls Base View

Dingmans Falls is the second highest waterfall in the state of Pennsylvania with a plunge of 130 feet (40 m). It is located at the northern end of the DWG park. There is a beautiful (composite) boardwalk that leads you to the base of the waterfall where you can see the 80-foot (24 m) cascading drop. This boardwalk is roughly 0.5 miles (0.80 km) long and takes you to the base of the falls, but also passes by Silverthread Falls. You can continue on up a series of stairs to the waterfall and see the entire 130-foot (40 m) plunge from the birds eye view. The best time to see this waterfall is about 24 hours after a hard rain, when it will be flowing fast and steady. This is probably the best known waterfall of Delaware Water Gap National Recreation Park.

=== Silverthread Falls ===
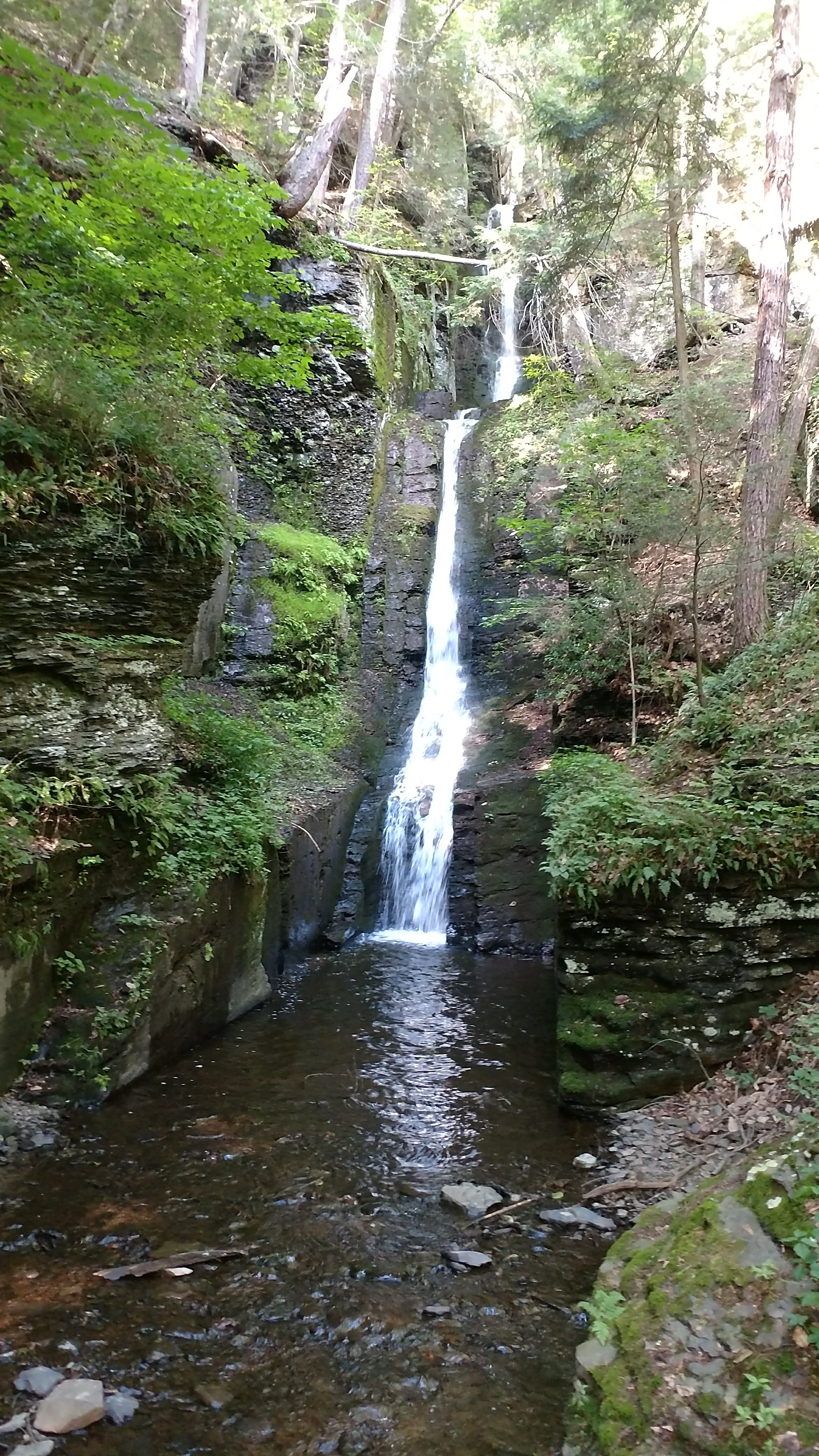
Silver Thread Falls Boardwalk View

Silverthread Falls is also located in upper Pennsylvania, less than 0.5 miles (0.80 km) from Dingmans Falls. This waterfall exhibits a steep drop of about 80 feet (24 m) via a narrow channel constructed of prominent rock-joints faces, however the volume of flow is much less than Dingmans Falls. Visitors can view both Silverthread and Ding Dong Falls via the same (composite) boardwalk & trail emanating from the Dingmans Falls Visitor Center.

=== Factory Falls ===
Factory Falls is located on the George W. Childs Park Trail in Pennsylvania, it follows Dingmans Creek so you are very close to Dingmans falls. The Brooks Family ran a woolen mill from 1823 to 1832 next to this fall, the remains of the mill can be seen next to the fall. You will take a single path through the woods that runs on both sides of the creek that is roughly 1.5 miles (2.4 km) in length. This waterfall is the first one in a set of three that is on this traill. Factory Falls drops twice and makes a 90 degree turn with the creek.

=== Fulmer Falls ===
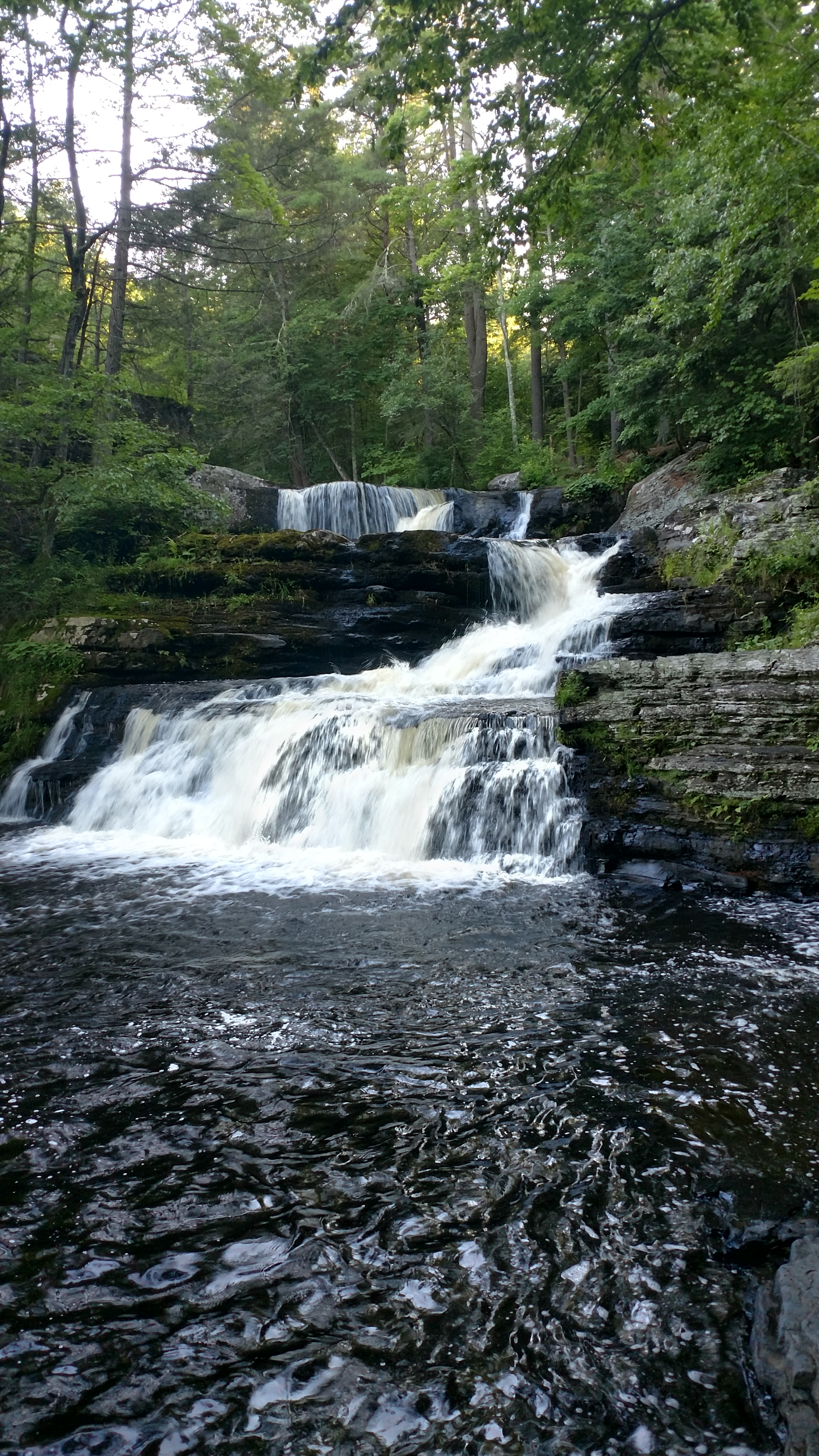
Factory Falls View

Fulmer Falls is the second waterfall along the George W. Childs Park Trail in Pennsylvania right after Factory Falls. This fall is 56 feet (17 m) tall and is the largest in George W. Childs Park. This waterfall has a unique feature of falling in a semi-circular basin of rock and then flowing downstream. The base of this waterfall is not accessible.

=== Deer Leap Falls ===
The third and last fall of the trail of George W. Childs Park is Deer Leap Falls. There is a bridge over top of the falls. There is a very large wide shallow pool at the bottom of the fall. Swimming and wading are not permitted.

=== Raymondskill Falls ===
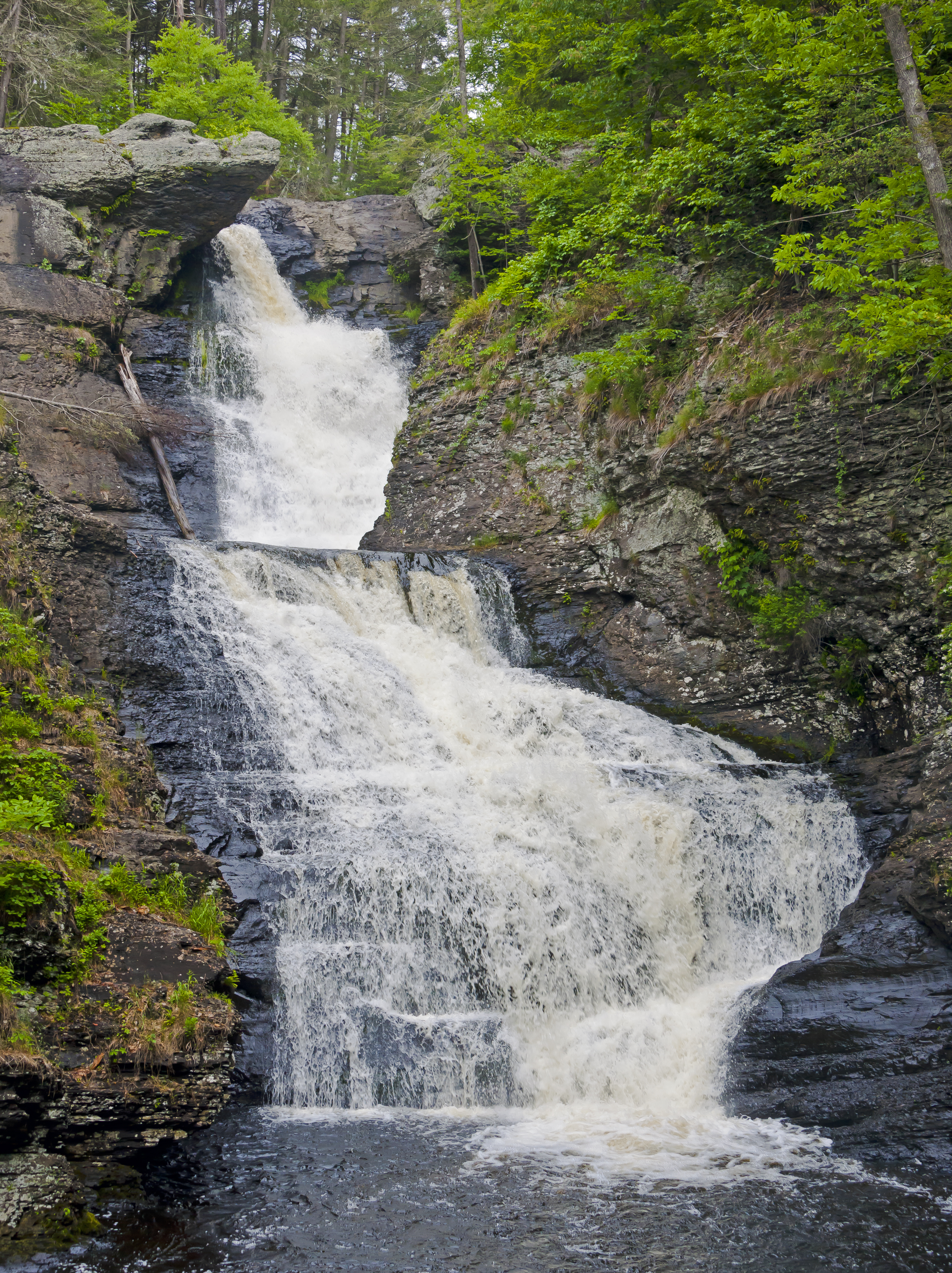
Middle and lower Ranymondskill cascades

Raymondskill Falls are a series of three cascading waterfalls located on Raymondskill Creek in Pike County, Pennsylvania. It is the tallest waterfall in Pennsylvania. The three tiers of Raymondskill Falls have a combined height of approximately 150 feet (46 m).

=== Van Campens Glen Falls ===
Van Campens Glen Falls is the terminus of the Lower Van Campens Glen trail hike near Walpack, NJ. The top of the falls features a deep, large pool that cascades down a slanted rock face. The areas surrounding the upper pool require extreme caution as this area has been responsible for numerous accidents and deaths in years past. The trail itself features a densely covered hemlock ravine that hosts various delicate plants and species of wildlife. The root systems at the base of many of the hemlocks have been damaged due to high foot traffic in the area. This, in addition to storm damage and a lack of funding, has led the National Park Service and Department of the Interior to close the Lower Van Campens Glen trail indefinitely, due to public hazard, as of Spring 2019.

== See also ==
- Bushkill Falls
