= List of seed packet companies =

This is a list of the major seed packet companies. Seed packets or packages include seeds for flowers, herbs, fruit, or vegetables and are typically sold to amateur gardeners. The seed packets generally include plant information and planting instructions on the label.

- Back to the Roots, established in 2009
- Botanical Interests, established in 1995
- Burpee Seeds, established in 1876
- D. Landreth Seed Company, established 1784
- Fedco Seeds, established in 1978
- Ferry-Morse Seed Company, established in 1856
- Gurney's Seed and Nursery Company, established in 1866
- Harris Seeds, established in 1879
- Hudson Valley Seed Company, established in 2009
- J.W. Jung Seed Company, established in 1907
- McKenzie Seeds, established in 1896
- Park Seed Company, established in 1868
- Richters Herbs, established in 1970
- R. H. Shumway, established in 1870
- Seeds of Change, established in 1989
- Southern Exposure Seed Exchange, established in 1983
- Wildseed Farms, established in 1983

== See also ==
- Seed company
