= Congressional seed distribution =

Federal program in the United States

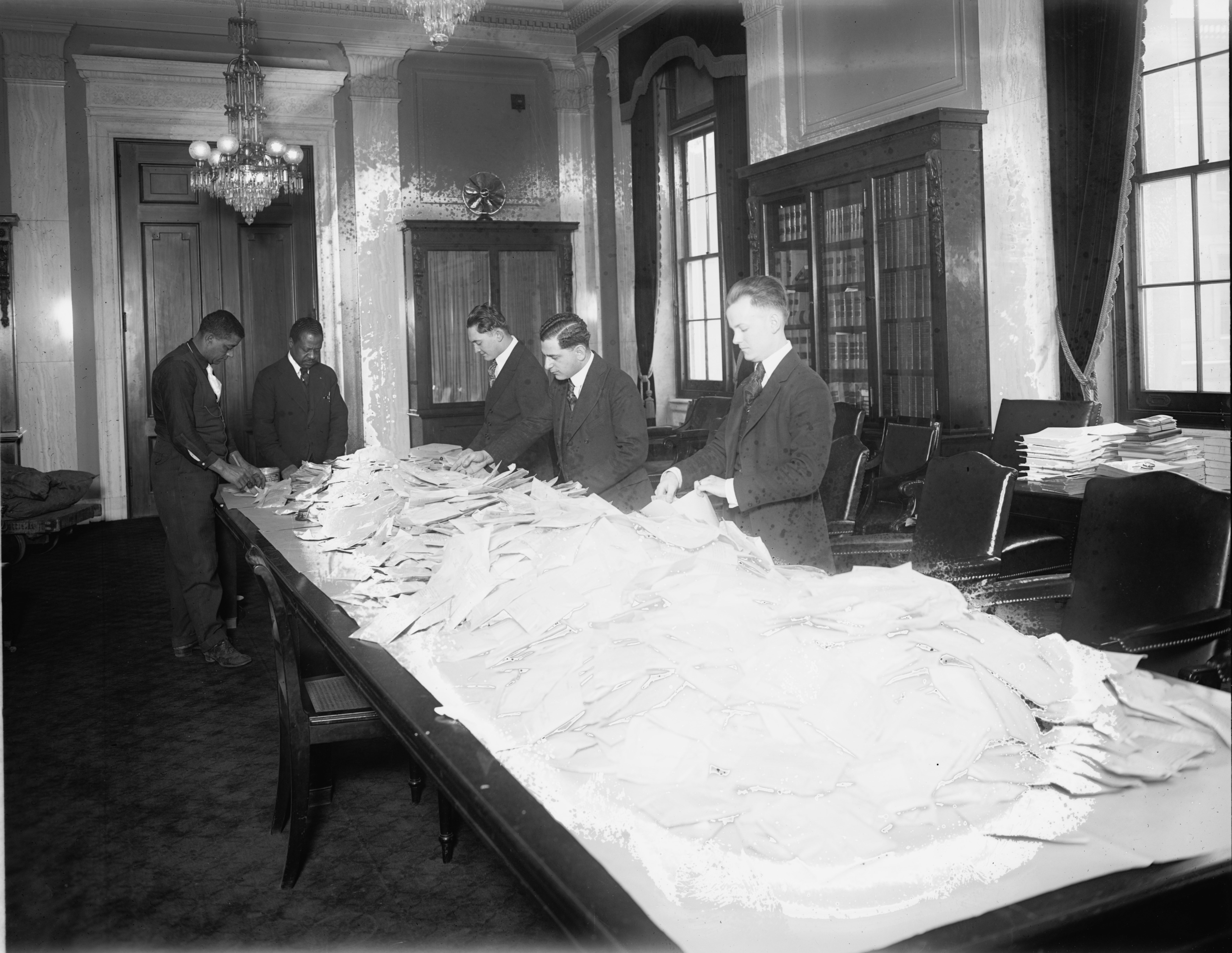
Seed distribution in the office of Boies Penrose, a United States senator from Pennsylvania

Congressional seed distribution was a United States program where members of the United States Congress directed the distribution of millions of packets of free seeds to farmers by the United States Department of Agriculture. The program of distributing seeds to farmers began in the mid-19th century under Henry Ellsworth, the commissioner of patents. Responsibility transferred to the United States Department of Agriculture (USDA) upon its formation in 1862, and was eventually placed under the Office of Congressional Seed Distribution. The program grew throughout the late 1800s despite some criticism of it as unconstitutional overreach of a too-large government and an instrument of political corruption. By the early 1900s, attacks on congressional seed distribution were becoming increasingly common, and the program was ended in 1924.

== Background ==
In the early years of the United States, farmers were left to develop seeds on their own. They worked to make seeds that would grow plants with better qualities like faster growth or sweeter fruit. The United States federal government became involved in the process in 1819, when William H. Crawford, the secretary of the treasury, asked American ambassadors and military officers to get seeds as they traveled around the world and bring them back to the US. The commissioner of patents, Henry Ellsworth, began gathering and distributing samples of foreign seeds in 1836. Ellsworth received government funding three years later to distribute seeds directly to farmers and by 1855 the United States Patent Office was distributing around one million seed packets to farmers. Six years later, in 1861, that number had risen to over two million.

== Program ==
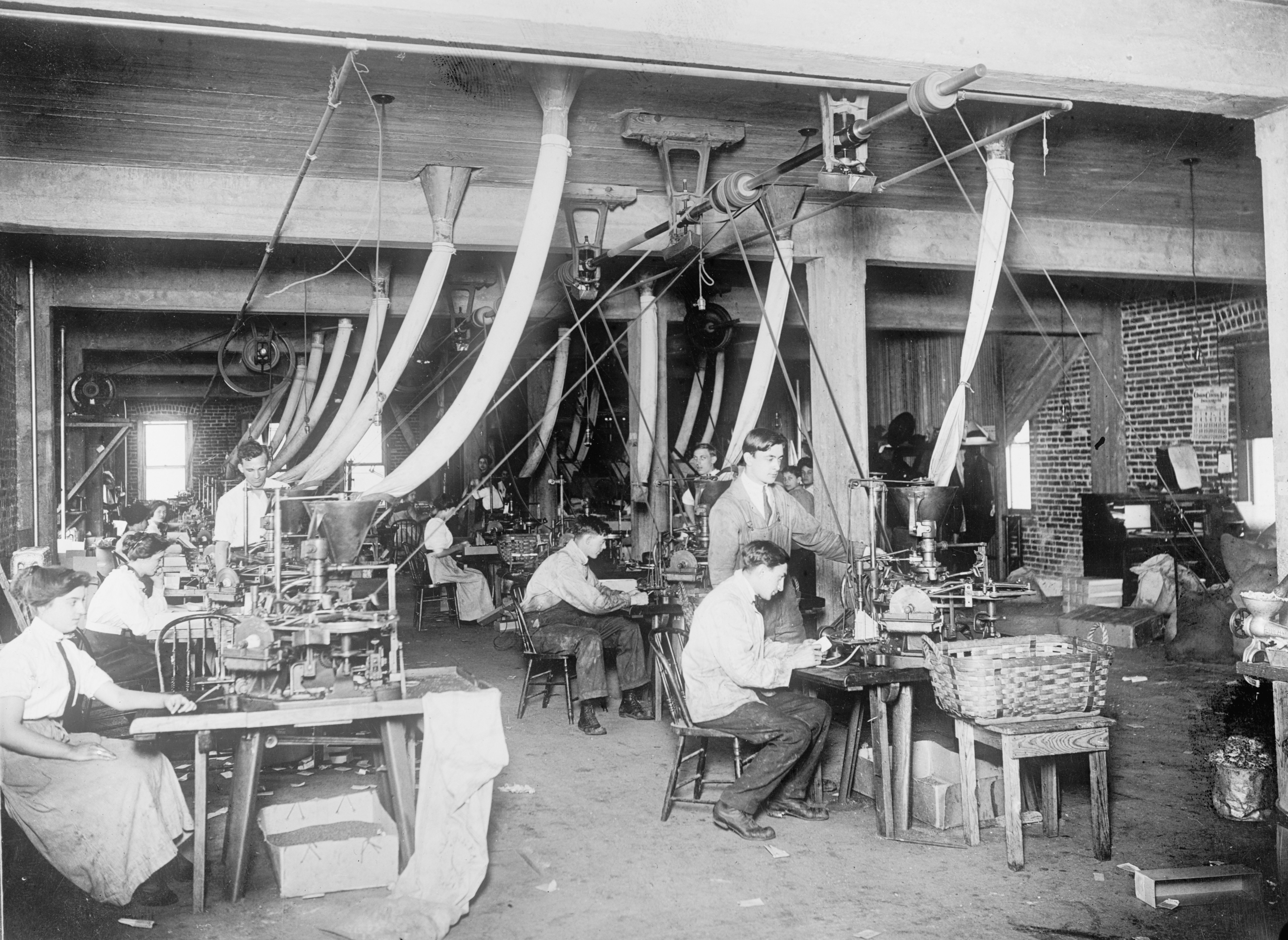
Seed sorting in the Seed Building

The United States Department of Agriculture (USDA) was established by an act of Congress in 1862. One of its functions as outlined in the legislation was to "collect new and valuable seeds and plants; to propagate such as may be worthy of propagation; and to distribute them among agriculturalists". The same year the Morrill Land-Grant Act of 1862 was passed, establishing many state agricultural colleges that would work to develop better seeds. The USDA sent seeds where congressmen told them to. Distribution of seeds was a large portion of the USDA's early function. In 1868, the USDA created a 'Seed Division'—later the Office of Congressional Seed Distribution—that was tasked mainly with "procuring and distributing seeds of superior and new plants." The division also worked to gather "from the recipients of seeds evaluation reports and other information that could be used to improve the seed distribution program." The USDA worked to create a commercial seed industry in the US by giving out small amounts of seeds for free. The program sent the vast majority of seeds through members of congress to farmers in their constituencies.

Members of the United States House of Representatives had several means to distribute seeds to the region they represented, including: using franking privilege to send them to specific farmers or giving seeds to postal workers/local party officials to distribute. Opponents criticized the system as a way to influence voters. Seed distribution floundered early on over concerns of its quality and suitability for American farms. In 1867, it was described as censured “in and out of Congress." United States Commissioner of Agriculture Frederick Watts resolved the issue by creating protocols to ensure high quality seeds and it gained some support. William Gates LeDuc, Watts' successor, unsuccessfully proposed creating labs around the country to manage seed testing and distribution. Congress increased appropriations for seed distribution to $75,000 in 1884 (equivalent to $2,624,722 in 2024). That year, Vick's Illustrated Magazine condemned "silence and tacit acquiescence" that allowed “this farce of a free seed distribution" as an example of political corruption. Others maintained that the program was unconstitutional. Appropriations for it reached $160,000 in 1893 (equivalent to $559,941 in 2024).

After a 1880 controversy over the distribution program, the program expanded to provide seeds directly to farmers and several other groups including agricultural societies and experiment stations. However, 3/4 of the seeds still had to go through "Congress members or their delegates". While the USDA had begun only distributing "new and improved" varieties of plants, as the program grew they were forced to include common varieties. In 1895, 9,901,153 seed packages were distributed, consisting of 8,963,059 packages of 162 varieties of vegetables, 771,780 packages of 73 varieties of flowers, 32,847 packages of 7 varieties of corn, and 18,752 packages of 4 varieties of cotton.

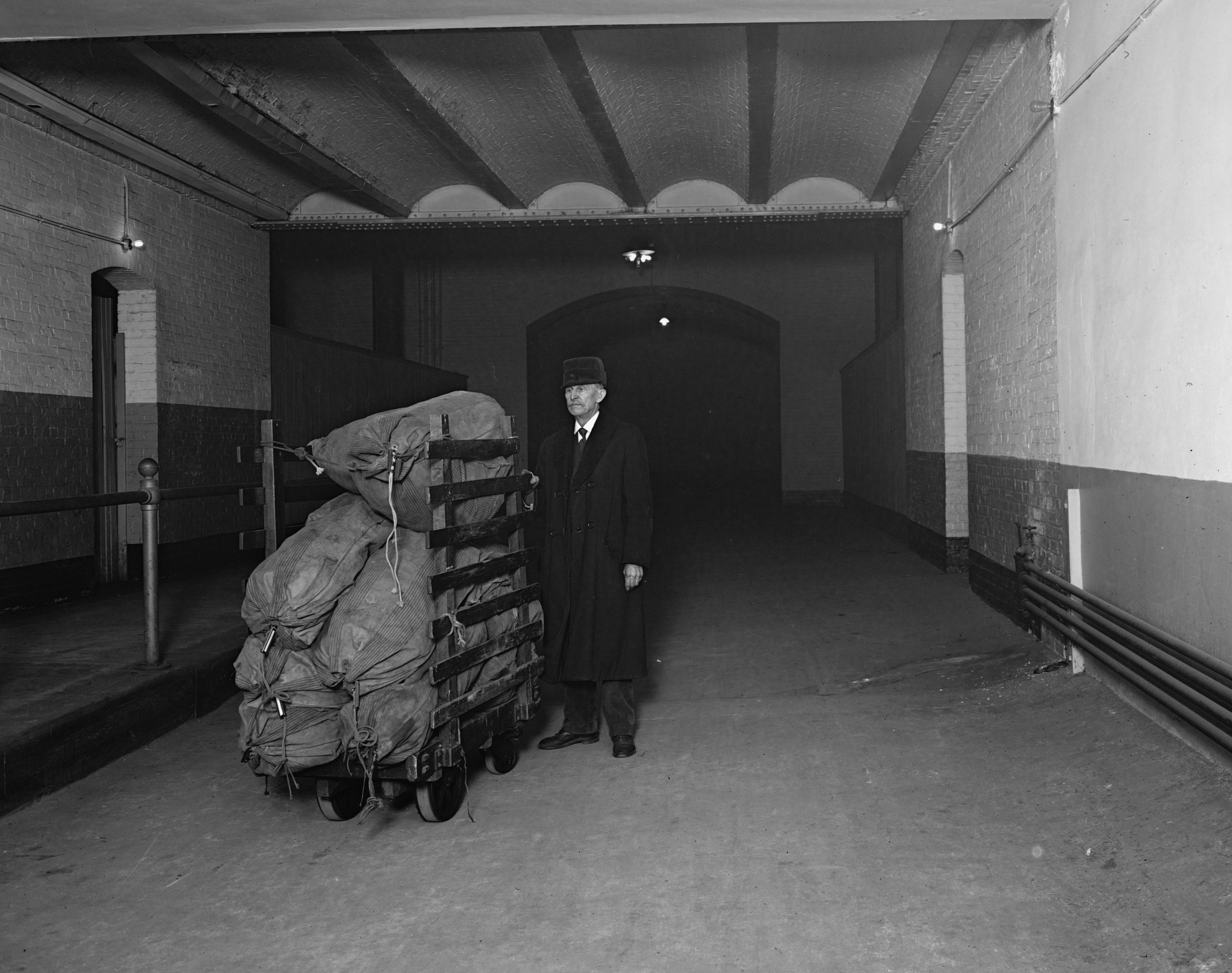
Seed distribution at the US Capitol

When Julius Sterling Morton became agriculture secretary in 1893, he fought to end congressional seed distribution. He felt it made politicians corrupt and that farmers should make their own decisions regarding seeds. He further highlighted qualms as to the constitutionality of the program and maintained that the government was too big, feeling that private seed companies would be more efficient than the government. Morton oversaw drastic cutting of the program's cost and found problems in the procedure for testing seed quality—as there were too many to reasonably test them. By 1896, he took the drastic step of purchasing no seeds at all to be distributed. Congress retaliated by passing a joint resolution that ordered a purchase of seeds and holding 5/6 for the members of congress to distribute.

Morton's replacement, James Wilson, also favored ending the program but worked to spend the majority of money allotted to him. In 1902, the USDA shifted to only focus on new varieties of seed. The secretary of the USDA created a Seed and Plant Introduction Section aimed at collecting new plant samples. By 1903, the program had $270,000 a year as it increased efforts to bring in new foreign seeds. Around the turn of the century the seed program shifted to providing needed scientific improvements in farming, such as drought tolerant varieties and those that could better handle the Boll weevil and the USDA expanded programs to educate farmers. While these choices increased the popularity of congressional seed distribution, some still criticized it as “a cheap bid for favor.”

== Decline ==
Advocacy groups for seed trade groups such as the American Seed Trade Association had been criticizing congressional seed distribution since at least the 1880s. Discussions about ending the distribution of free seed gradually gained more traction around 1907, through a proposal to transfer distribution to the USDA while continuing to send free seeds to schoolchildren. After lengthy debates, Congress increased the appropriation for that year. In 1910, 60,620,000 packets of seeds were distributed. Efforts continued to eliminate or reduce the program, notably in 1916 and 1917—when the Senate attempted to modify appropriations for the program, but over 13 million seed packages were still distributed in 1918. The seed program was not ended until it was left out of appropriations during 1923 for 1924.

== Evaluation ==
Historian Daniel Carpenter called congressional seed distribution “the dominant federal agricultural program of the nineteenth century.” Deborah Fitzgerald wrote that it was “a way for Congressmen to enhance their images by appearing sympathetic to agricultural interests in their districts.” The program provided for the introduction of sorghum, Japanese rice, durum wheat, and other new plant varieties to the US.

== Gallery ==
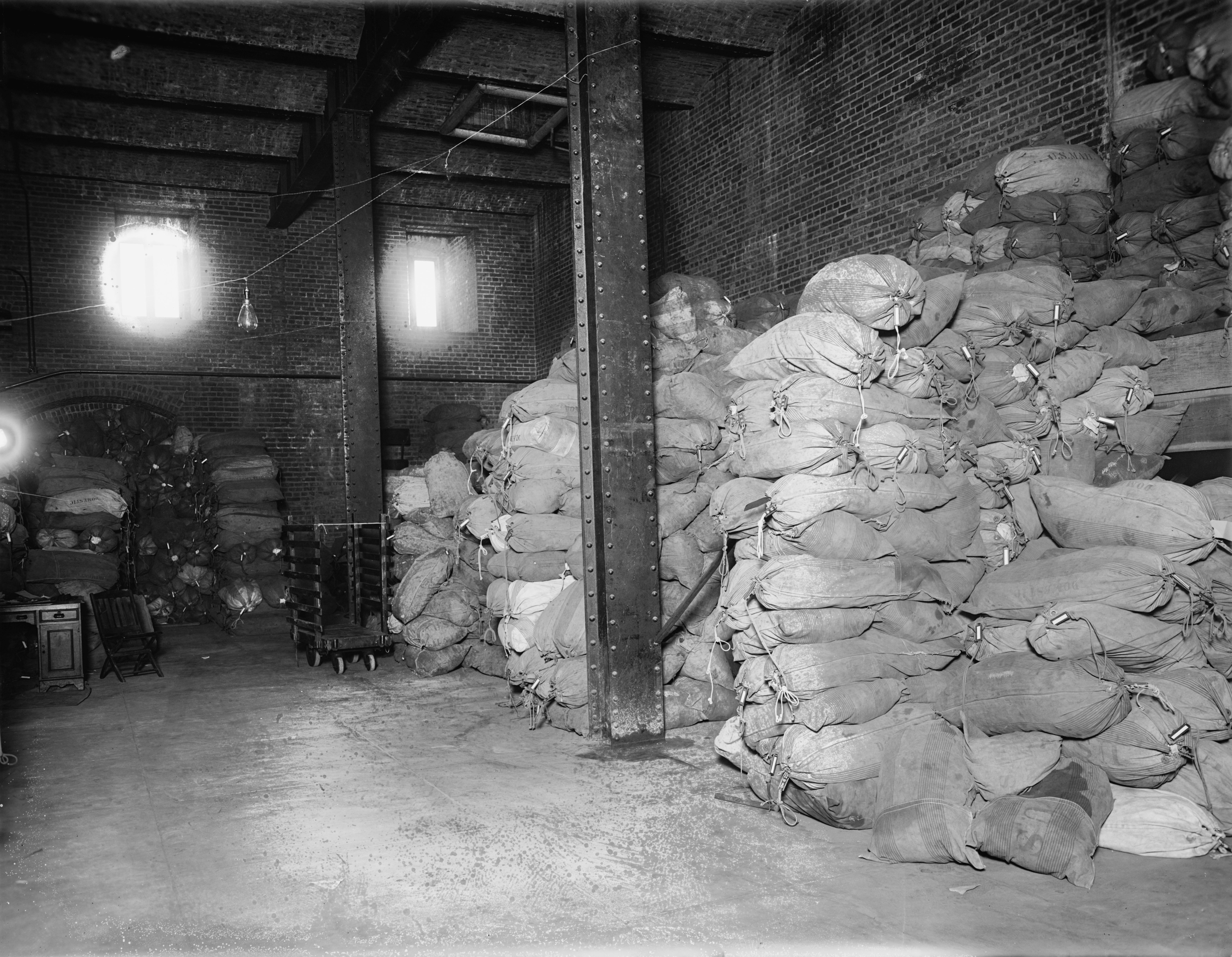
Seed stands in the United States Capitol

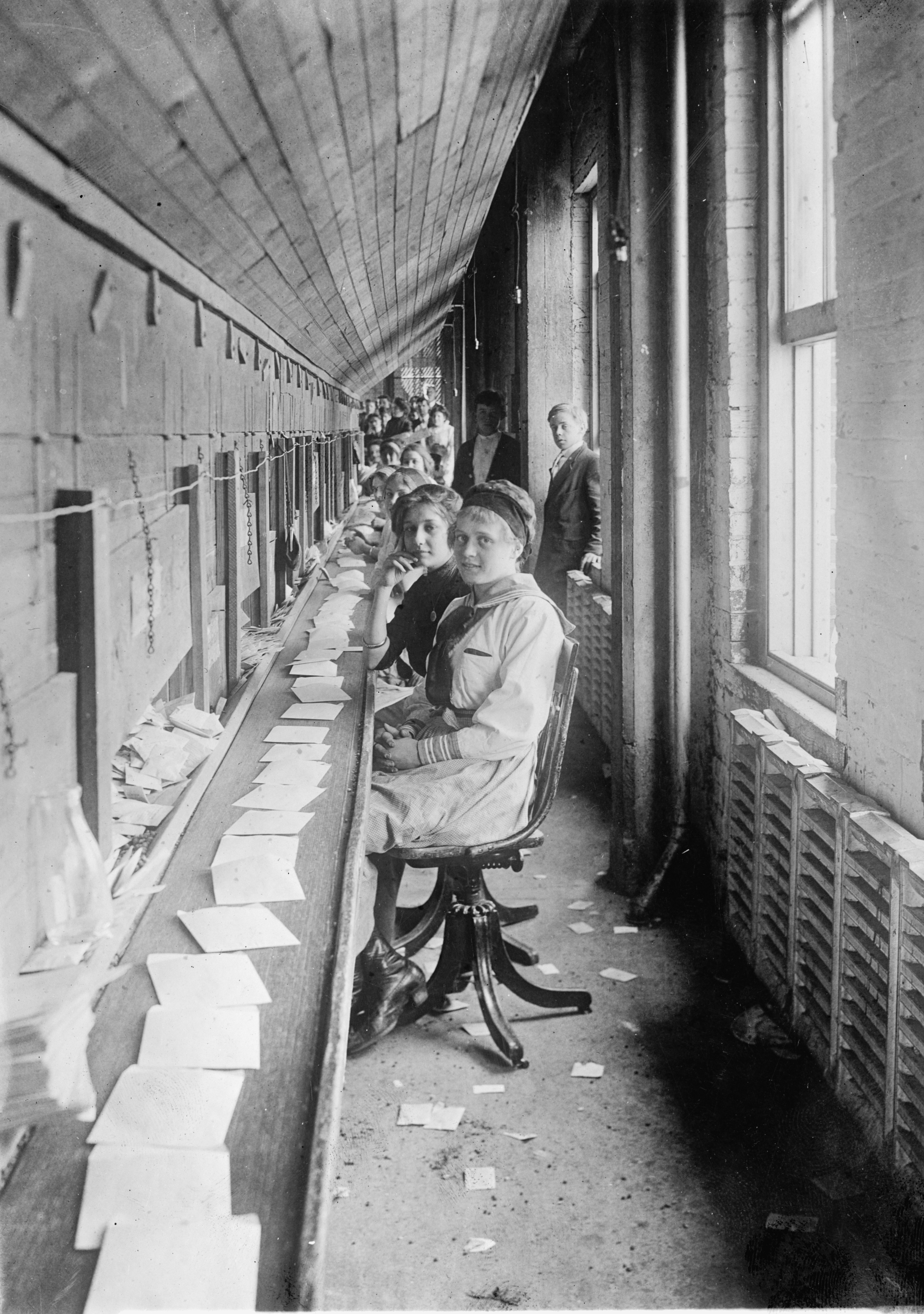
Seed distribution

== Bibliography ==
- Cooke, Kathy J. (July 2018). ""Who Wants White Carrots?": Congressional Seed Distribution, 1862 to 1923". The Journal of the Gilded Age and Progressive Era. 17 (3): 475–500. doi:10.1017/S1537781418000075. ISSN 1537-7814. S2CID 165171291.
- Service, United States National Archives and Records (1954). Preliminary Inventory of the Cartographic Records of the United States Marine Corps: (Record Group 127). National Archives, National Archives and Records Service, General Services Administration.
- Griesbach, R. J. (June 2013). "150 Years of Research at the United States Department of Agriculture: Plant Introduction and Breeding" (PDF). United States Department of Agriculture.
- "Plants, Patents, and Seed Innovation in the Agricultural Industry" (PDF). Congressional Research Service. September 13, 2002.
