= Robert Fish =

Robert Fish may refer to:

- Robert L. Fish (1912–1981), American author
- Robert Fish (footballer) (1871–1944), English footballer
- Robert Fish (shipbuilder) (c. 1812–1883), American yacht modeler and shipbuilder
- Bobby Fish (born 1976), American professional wrestler
- Bob Fish (NASCAR owner) (died 1958), American NASCAR Grand National Series race car owner
- Bob Fish (singer) (1949–2021), British rock and roll and doo-wop singer
- Robert W. Fish (1897–1982), American politician from Pennsylvania

== See also ==
- Robert "Fish" Jones, American businessman and showman
