= Mechanicsburg, Pennsylvania =

Borough in Pennsylvania, US

Mechanicsburg
- Borough
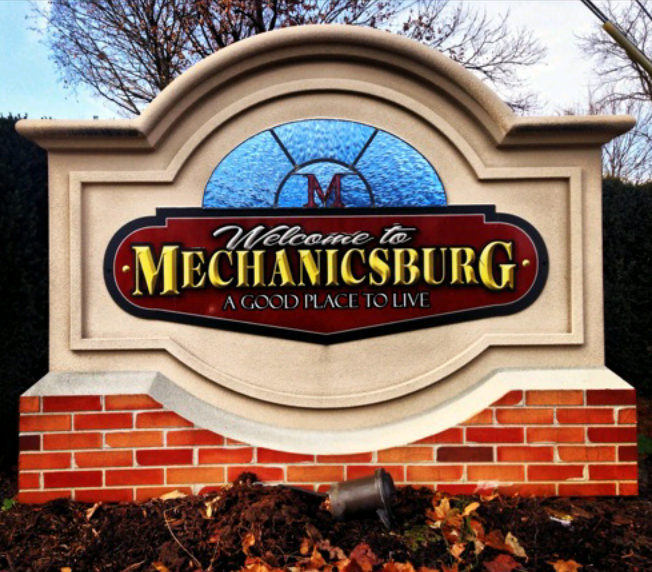

- Flag Seal
- Motto: "A good place to live since 1828"
- Location of Mechanicsburg in Cumberland County, Pennsylvania.

- Location in Pennsylvania and the United States Mechanicsburg (the United States)
- Coordinates: 40°12′44″N 77°00′22″W
- Country: United States
- State: Pennsylvania
- County: Cumberland
- Settled: 1806
- Incorporated: 1828

Government
  - Type: Borough Council
  - Mayor: Jack Ritter
  - Council President: Kyle Miller
  - Council Vice President: John Anthony
  - Borough Manager: Layne Thompson
  - Borough Solicitor: Michael Cassidy

Area
  - Total: 2.41 sq mi (6.25 km^{2})
  - Land: 2.41 sq mi (6.24 km^{2})
  - Water: 0 sq mi (0.00 km^{2})
- Elevation: 446 ft (136 m)

Population (2020)
  - Total: 9,311
  - Density: 3,862.7/sq mi (1,491.39/km^{2})
- Time zone: UTC-5 (Eastern (EST))
  - Summer (DST): UTC-4 (EDT)
- ZIP Codes: 17055, 17050
- Area code: 717
- FIPS code: 42-48376
- Website: www.mechanicsburgpa.org

Mechanicsburg is a borough in Cumberland County, Pennsylvania, United States. The borough is eight miles (13 km) west of Harrisburg. It is part of the Harrisburg–Carlisle metropolitan statistical area. As of the 2020 census, the population was 9,311, up from 8,981 recorded at the 2010 census.

== Geography ==
Mechanicsburg is located in eastern Cumberland County at 40°12′44″N 77°00′22″W. It is in a rich agricultural region known as the Cumberland Valley, a broad zone between South Mountain and the Ridge-and-Valley Appalachians.

Mechanicsburg is bordered by Silver Spring Township to the northwest, Monroe Township to the southwest, Upper Allen Township to the south, Lower Allen Township to the east, and Hampden Township to the northeast. Pennsylvania Route 641 (Trindle Road) is the main east–west street through the borough, leading east 4 miles (6 km) to Camp Hill and west 10 miles (16 km) to Carlisle, the county seat. Pennsylvania Route 114 leads north out of town on York Street and south on Market Street. The Pennsylvania Turnpike (I-76) passes just south of Mechanicsburg, with access to the southeast of town via Exit 236 (U.S. Route 15).

According to the United States Census Bureau, the borough has a total area of 2.41 square miles (6.25 km^{2}), of which 1.1 acres (4,478 m^{2}), or 0.07%, is water. It has a hot-summer humid continental climate (Dfa) and monthly average temperatures range from 29.9 °F (−1.2 °C) in January to 74.8 °F (23.8 °C) in July. The hardiness zone is borderline between 6b and 7a, meaning that the annual average absolute minimum temperature is approximately 0 °F.

== Demographics ==
In 1900, 3,841 people lived here; in 1910, the population was 4,469, which increased to 5,709 in 1940. As of the 2010 census, the borough population was 8,981.

Historical population
Census	Pop.	Note	%±
1830	534		—
1840	670		25.5%
1850	888		32.5%
1860	1,939		118.4%
1870	2,569		32.5%
1880	3,018		17.5%
1890	3,691		22.3%
1900	3,841		4.1%
1910	4,469		16.3%
1920	4,688		4.9%
1930	5,647		20.5%
1940	5,709		1.1%
1950	6,786		18.9%
1960	8,123		19.7%
1970	9,385		15.5%
1980	9,487		1.1%
1990	9,452		−0.4%
2000	9,042		−4.3%
2010	8,981		−0.7%
2020	9,311		3.7%

As of the census of 2000, there were 9,042 people, 4,023 households, and 2,466 families residing in the borough. The population density was 3,494.6 inhabitants per square mile (1,349.3/km^{2}). There were 4,169 housing units at an average density of 1,611.3 units per square mile (622.1 units/km^{2}). The racial makeup of the borough was 96.97% White, 0.43% African American, 0.09% Native American, 1.15% Asian, 0.28% from other races, and 1.08% from two or more races. Hispanic or Latino of any race were 0.83% of the population.

There were 4,024 households, out of which 25.7% had children under the age of 18 living with them, 49.1% were married couples living together, 8.8% had a female householder with no husband present, and 38.7% were non-families. Of all households, 32.8% were made up of individuals, and 10.3% had someone living alone who was 65 years of age or older. The average household size was 2.23 and the average family size was 2.85.

In the borough the population was spread out, with 21.5% under the age of 18, 7.3% from 18 to 24, 30.8% from 25 to 44, 24.6% from 45 to 64, and 15.8% who were 65 years of age or older. The median age was 39 years. For every 100 females, there were 91.3 males. For every 100 females age 18 and over, there were 86.7 males.

The median income for a household in the borough was $45,200, and the median income for a family was $54,228. Males had a median income of $37,130 versus $27,940 for females. The per capita income for the borough was $22,812. About 2.4% of families and 4.2% of the population were below the poverty line, including 6.0% of those under age 18 and 5.0% of those age 65 or over.

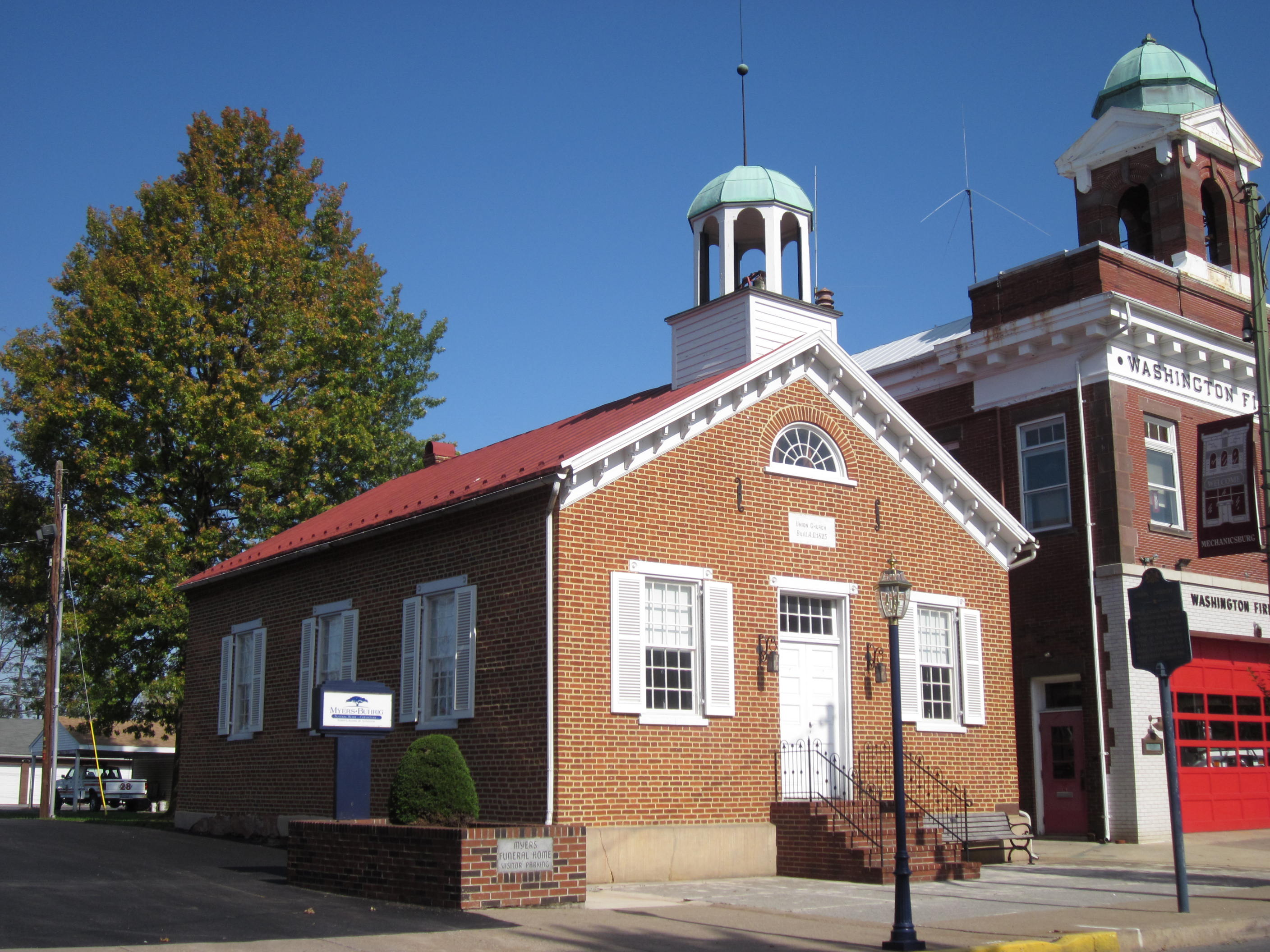
Union church in Mechanicsburg

== History ==
=== 19th century ===
Mechanicsburg was named after a settlement of mechanics who made and repaired Conestoga wagons in the early 19th century.

In 1837, when the Cumberland Valley Railroad (CVRR) completed its line, Mechanicsburg was designated as a water station, where workers could restock the locomotive with firewood and water. This proved especially useful for those traveling between Carlisle and Harrisburg, two large cities at the time. This important function also contributed to the town's growth. The train became the town's link to the world of business and industry. Grain and feed companies, lumber yards and numerous factories were purposely built alongside the railroad tracks. Archives show that, at one time, there were 25 trains chugging through the town daily carrying travelers, coal, feathers, fruit, ice, mail and newspapers. During the American Civil War, the railroad was a valuable method of transporting troops and supplies.

On June 28, 1863, Confederate troops led by Brig. Gen. Albert G. Jenkins raided Mechanicsburg, and two days later, met Union forces in the Skirmish of Sporting Hill, just east of town. Following the Skirmish of Sporting Hill, the Confederate forces retreated south into the little town of Gettysburg where the Battle of Gettysburg would be fought.

The oldest building in Mechanicsburg is the Frankenberger Tavern. One of Mechanicsburg's first residents was George Frankenberger, who in 1801 applied for a license to open his newly built log home for the "convenience" of travelers. In exchange for a small fee, Mr. Frankenberger offered cattle drivers a warm meal and a place to sleep. This proved to be rather lucrative, as many people were making the two-day trek between Harrisburg (the state capital) and Carlisle (Cumberland County's county seat).

=== 20th and 21st century ===
Approximately six trains travel through Mechanicsburg presently, which has increased due to new operations on the local sub-line owned by Norfolk Southern. Although automotive technology changed the town forever, today's residents cannot dismiss the vital role the railroad played in its development.

Mechanicsburg's contemporary growth has also included the building of the Naval Support Activity on 840 acres (340 ha) of land in Hampden Township, Pennsylvania. NSA Mechanicsburg continues to serve as one of the Defense Department's major logistics sites.

Mechanicsburg is centered on 100 acres (40 ha) that Leonard Fisher purchased from Joseph Heynes' tract (No. 1442 of an original grant of 267 acres (1.08 km^{2}) from William Penn. Before becoming incorporated on April 12, 1828, the town went by several different names. First, Drytown, because of the extreme scarcity of water during the winter and summer. It was also known as Pinchgut, a German name used as a sign of amusement given to a small village of only a few people. Some also referred to the town as Staufferstown, in honor of Henry Stauffer, the owner of much of the land in the center of town, or briefly as Creekville during the Colonial Era.

Mechanicsburg is home to many historic markers, such as Irving Female College (named for Washington Irving, a trustee), the first women's college in Pennsylvania to grant degrees in arts and sciences.

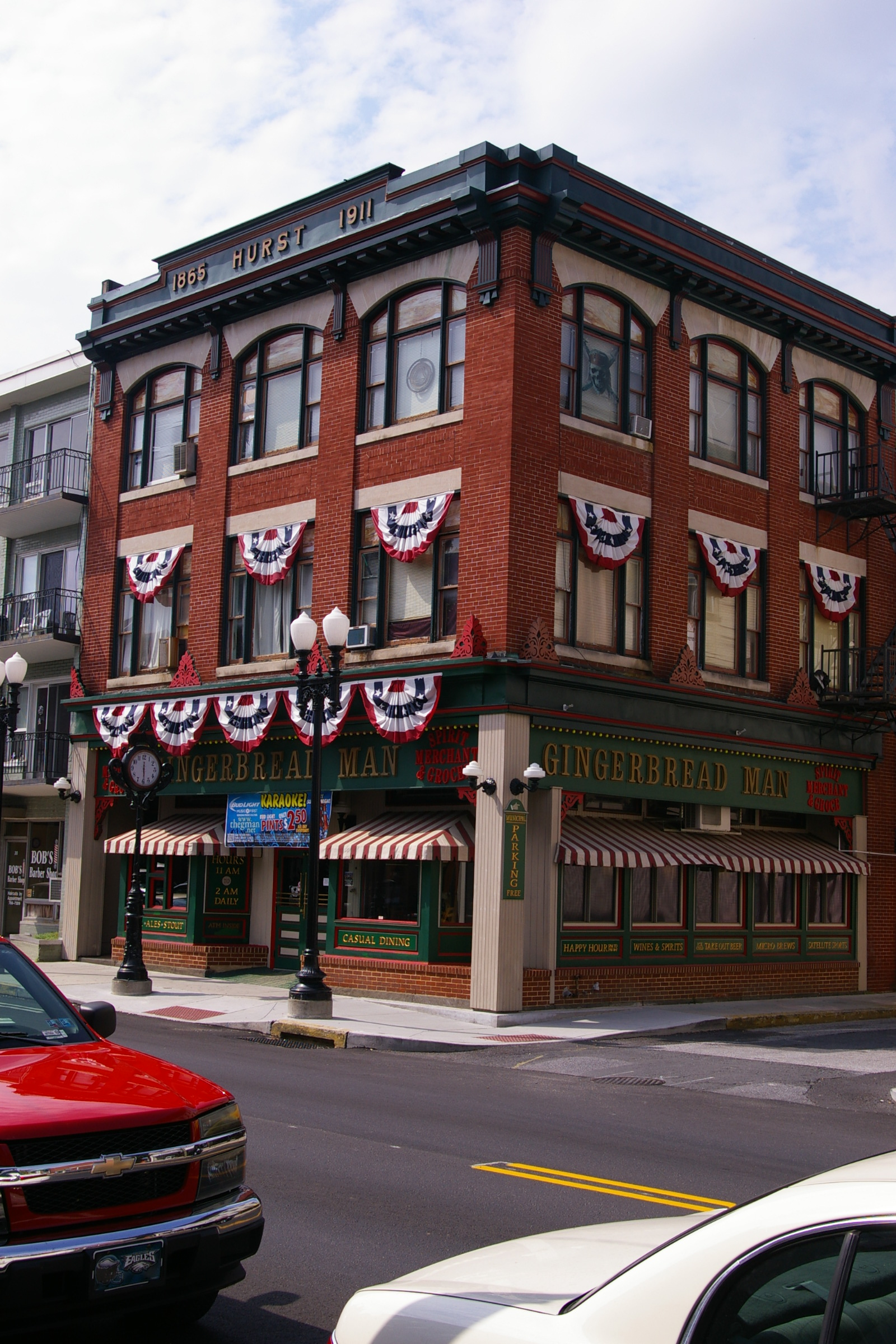
A restaurant within the Mechanicsburg Commercial Historic District

The Mechanicsburg Commercial Historic District, Irving Female College, Cumberland Valley Railroad Station and Station Master's House, Adam Orris House, and Simpson Street School are listed on the National Register of Historic Places.

== Government and infrastructure ==
The Pennsylvania Department of Corrections has its headquarters in Hampden Township, Cumberland County, near Mechanicsburg. Mechanicsburg lies in the center of a regional transportation crossroads, with Interstate 81, Interstate 76, Interstate 83, US Route 11, and US Route 15 passing in close proximity to the borough. The Appalachian Trail passes through Pennsylvania a few miles west of Mechanicsburg, in nearby Boiling Springs. The Naval Support Activity Mechanicsburg is located off the Carlisle Pike just outside of Mechanicsburg.

== Education ==
The school district for the borough is Mechanicsburg Area School District. The district operates Mechanicsburg Area Senior High School, with Joseph Reidy as the principal of the school within the Mechanicsburg borough.

Messiah University is in nearby Upper Allen Township.

Cumberland Valley High School of Cumberland Valley School District is in Silver Spring Township, with a Mechanicsburg postal address. That district does not cover Mechanicsburg borough.

== Points of interest ==
- Liberty Forge Arboretum
- Williams Grove Speedway
- Union Church
- Stationmaster's House
- Frankenberger Tavern
- Hall's tower

== Notable people ==
- Shawn Abner, former Major League Baseball outfielder
- Lionel Bender, linguist
- Dustin Bixler, soccer player
- Dave Brandt, soccer coach
- Brent Brockman, soccer player and coach
- Abner Carroll Binder, newspaper correspondent and editor for the Chicago Daily News and the Minneapolis Tribune
- Bobby Dall, musician, bassist for Poison
- George M. Eckels (1857–1916), member of the Pennsylvania House of Representatives
- Robert W. Fish (1897–1982), member of the Pennsylvania House of Representatives
- Charles Forsman, comic book writer
- Shane Gillis, comedian
- Candace Kirby, blogger, humor columnist, and former television writer
- Alec Jeffery Koone, musician and producer better known by the stage name Balam Acab
- Randall R. Marchi, US Army major general
- Luke Matheny, Academy Award-winning director, actor, and writer
- Mark D. McCormack, US Army major general
- Bret Michaels, musician, lead singer for Poison
- Garth Rickards, racing driver
- Jon Ritchie, former professional football player, currently a Philadelphia sports radio personality on WIP middays
- Rikki Rockett, musician drummer for Poison
- Scump, former eSports player
- Carla Thomas, former professional basketball player
- Andrew Kevin Walker, screenwriter
- Bobby Warshaw, retired professional soccer player
- Mike Tyler, radio personality
