= Mechanicsburg Commercial Historic District =

Mechanicsburg Commercial Historic District may refer to:

- Mechanicsburg Commercial Historic District (Mechanicsburg, Ohio), listed on the National Register of Historic Places in Champaign County, Ohio
- Mechanicsburg Commercial Historic District (Mechanicsburg, Pennsylvania), listed on the National Register of Historic Places in Cumberland County, Pennsylvania
