= Wildseed Farms =

Wildflower farm in Texas

Coordinates: 30°13′21.9″N 98°46′5.7″W

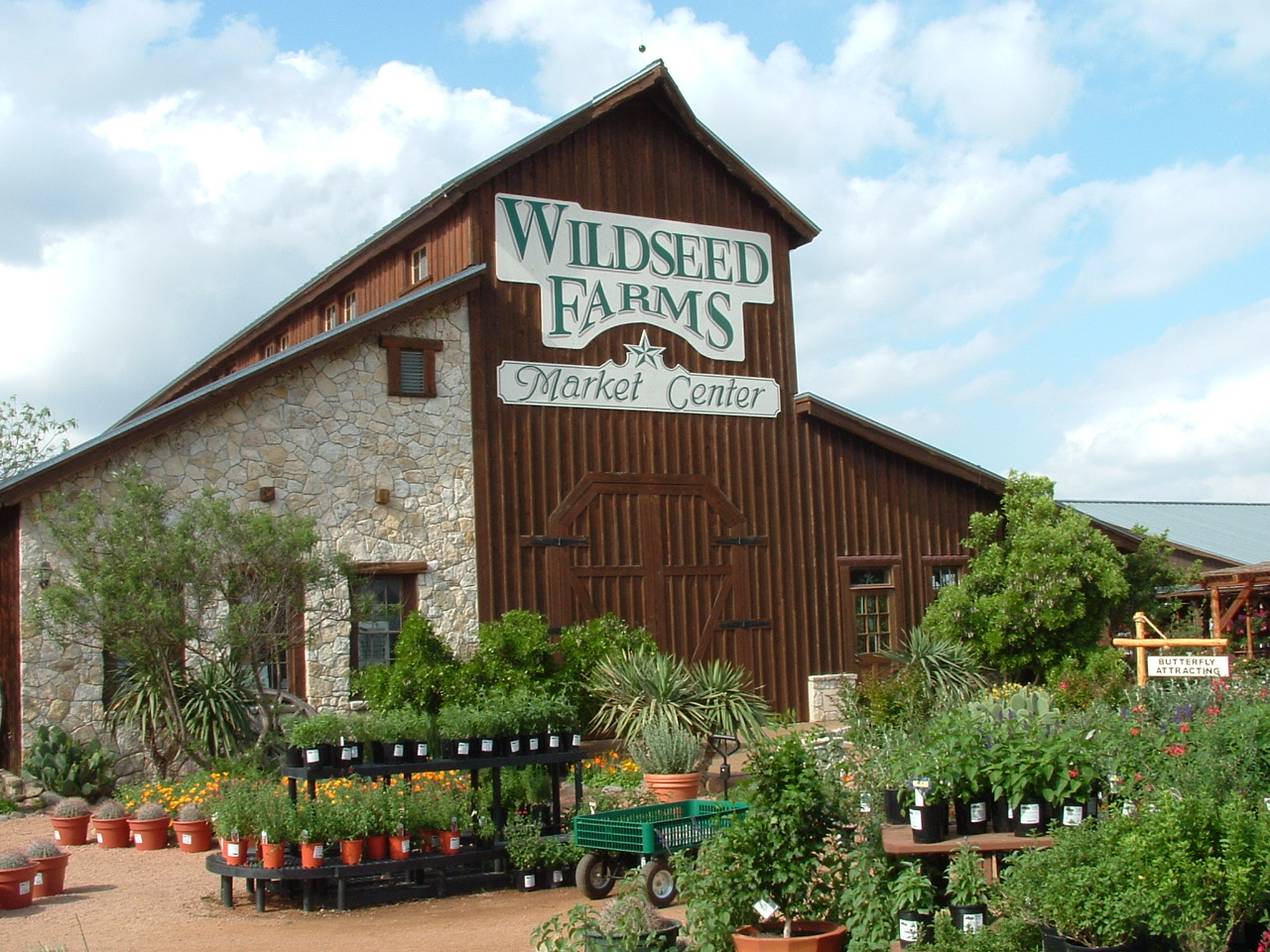
- Type: Privately Held
- Industry: Mail-Order Gardening
- Founded: 1983 Eagle Lake, Texas USA
- Headquarters: Fredericksburg, Texas, USA
- Products: Seeds, plants, garden art, and accessories
- Website: www.wildseedfarms.com

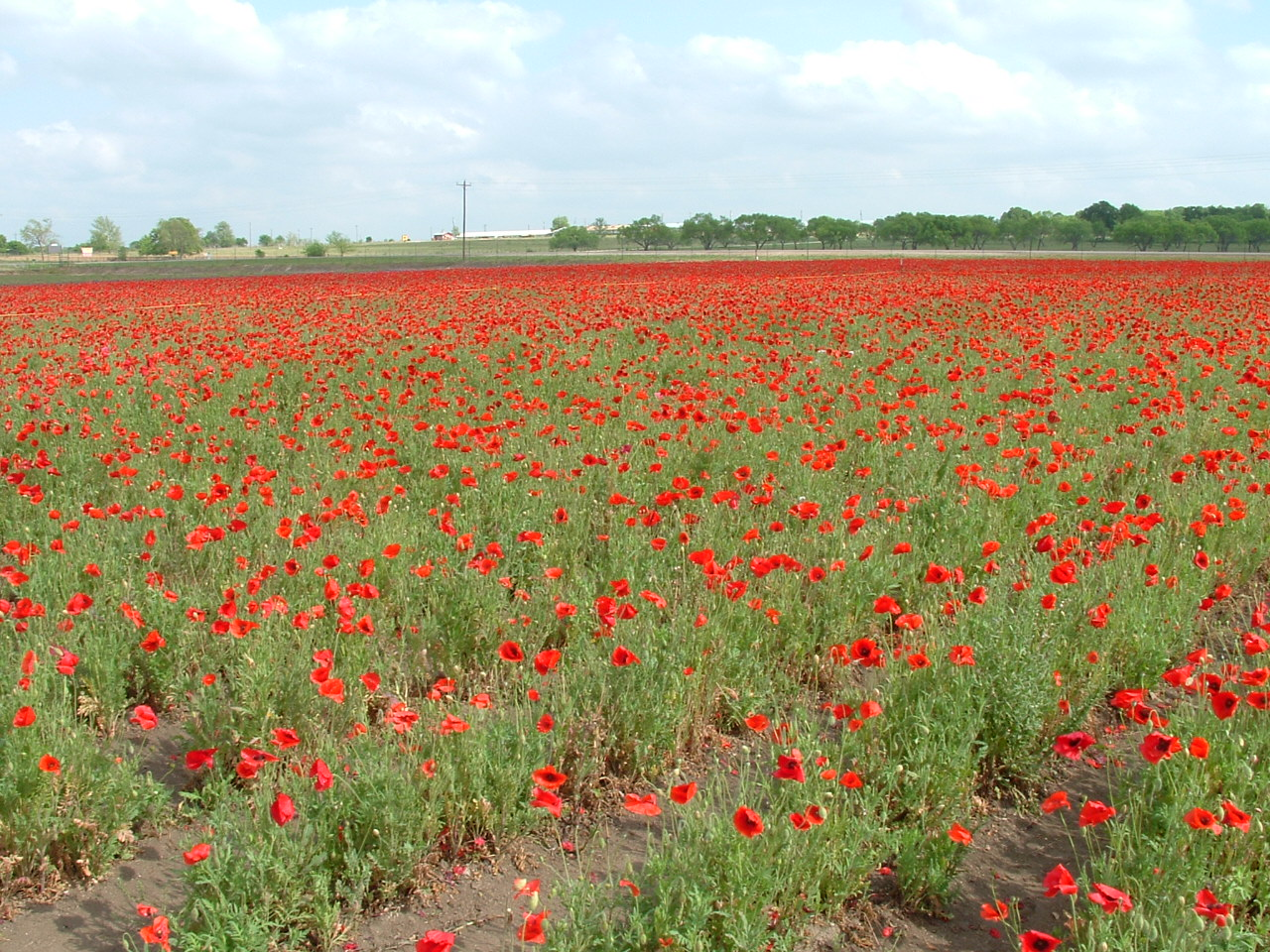
Poppy field at Wildseed Farms

Wildseed Farms is a wildflower farm near Fredericksburg, Texas, United States. It is the largest working wildflower farm in the country. The farm won the Garden Center 2001 Innovator award.

== History ==
The farm opened in 1983 in Eagle Lake as a seed producer and initially only allowed the public to visit in April of every year. These visit days proved to be extremely popular, so much so that the owners, John and Marilyn Thomas, decided to relocate to a more accessible location. In 1995, they purchased the plot on Texas State Highway 290. Development for a retail facility and visitor center was completed in 1997. Because the farm is located near Fredericksburg, a town that has a 19th-century feel to it, the main buildings of the farm were also constructed to match the decor of the town.

== Revenue and operations ==
Wildseed Farms does about $4 million in sales each year, with approximately $1.5 million coming from the retail facility, which can see roughly 100,000 visitors between March and May of each year. Besides plant sales, the farm also has a butterfly area and hosts live concerts and other attractions.
