= Candace Kirby =

American blogger

- Born: September 25; Mechanicsburg, Pennsylvania
- Occupation: Humor Columnist

Candace "Candy" Kirby is an American blogger, humor columnist, and former television writer who resides in Los Angeles, California. She publishes the popular family humor site, The Laughing Stork, and writes humor columns for Redbook, Disney and Nickelodeon's comedy site for moms, NickMom.

Kirby was born in Mechanicsburg, Pennsylvania, and majored in Government at Shippensburg University in Shippensburg, Pennsylvania, graduating in 1996. She then moved to New York, New York to work in public relations. Kirby earned a master's degree in Marketing Communications at Northwestern University in 2000 and subsequently moved to Los Angeles to launch a career in writing. She became a television writer for the CBS soap opera The Bold and the Beautiful in 2004, where she worked for 92 episodes before segueing into humorous online writing in 2006.
