= Adam Orris House =

Historic house in Pennsylvania, United States

- U.S. National Register of Historic Places
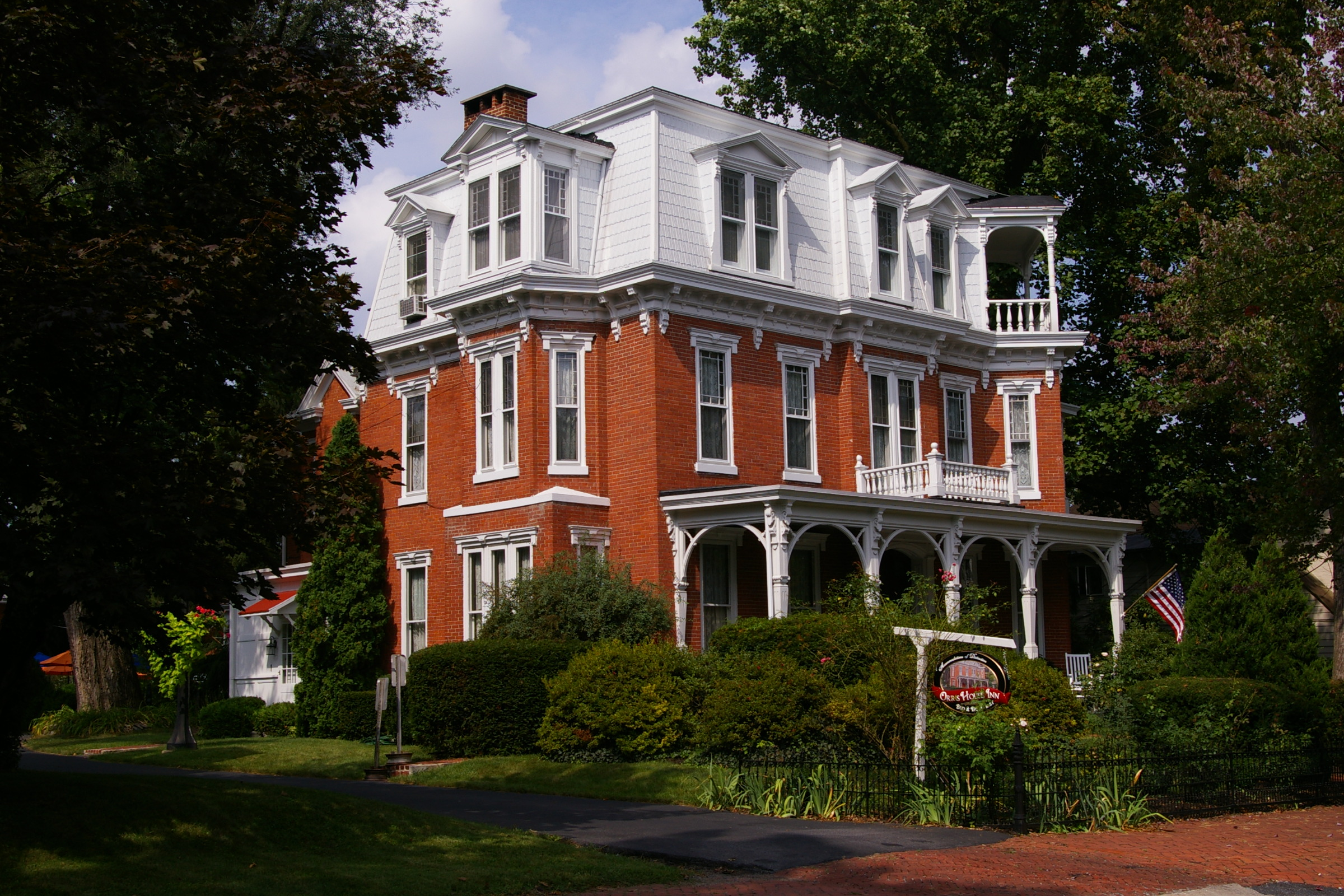

- Location within Pennsylvania Location within the United States
- Location: 318 W. Main St., Mechanicsburg, Pennsylvania
- Coordinates: 40°12′42″N 77°0′51″W
- Area: 0.8 acres (0.32 ha)
- Built: c. 1887
- Architectural style: Second Empire
- NRHP reference No.: 87002206
- Added to NRHP: December 30, 1987

Adam Orris House is a historic home located at Mechanicsburg in Cumberland County, Pennsylvania. It was built about 1887, and is a three-story, rectangular brick building in the Second Empire style. It features a tin mansard roof, projecting three-story bay, corner tower, and full-width front porch. Also on the property is a contributing carriage house, also built about 1887.

It was listed on the National Register of Historic Places in 1987.
