= William Gates LeDuc =

Fourth United States Commissioner of Agriculture

William LeDuc
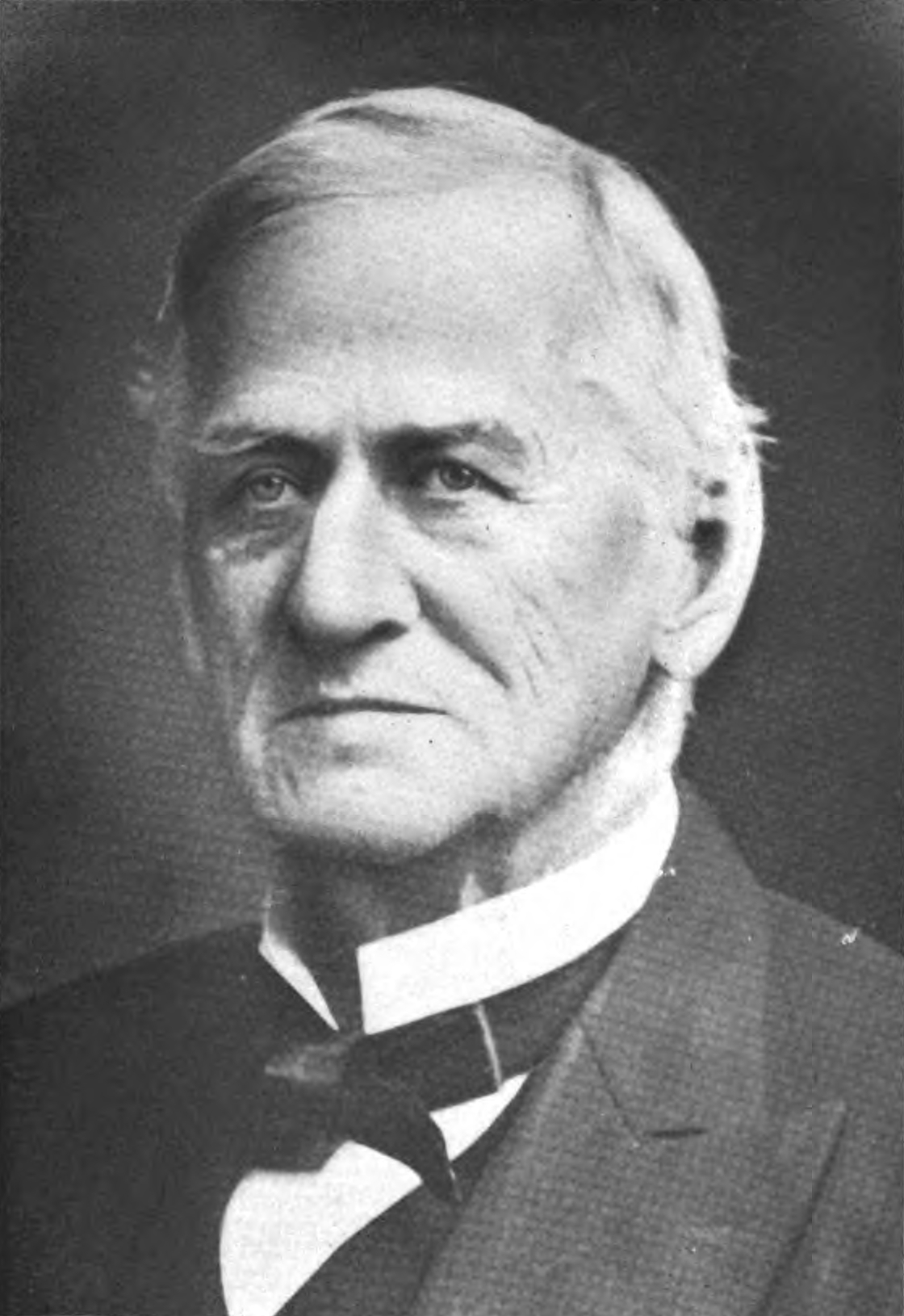

4th United States Commissioner of Agriculture
- In office July 1, 1877 – March 4, 1881
- President: Rutherford B. Hayes
- Preceded by: Frederick Watts
- Succeeded by: George B. Loring

Personal details
- Born: William Gates LeDuc; March 29, 1823 Wilkesville, Ohio, U.S.
- Died: October 30, 1917 (aged 94) Hastings, Minnesota, U.S.
- Education: Kenyon College (BA)

William Gates LeDuc (March 29, 1823 – October 30, 1917) was an American politician from Minnesota who served as the fourth United States commissioner of agriculture from July 1, 1877, to 1881. He also served in the Union Army during the American Civil War and was a prominent figure in the early development of Minnesota.

== Biography ==
=== Early life and career ===
William Gates LeDuc was born on March 29, 1823, in Wilkesville, Ohio. He attended public schools and Howe's Academy in Lancaster, Ohio. He was friends with William Tecumseh Sherman and Sherman's sister while at school. From 1844 to 1848 he attended Kenyon College. LeDuc was admitted to the bar in Ohio in 1849 or 1850, after studying under Columbus Delano in Mount Vernon. His wife was named Mary.

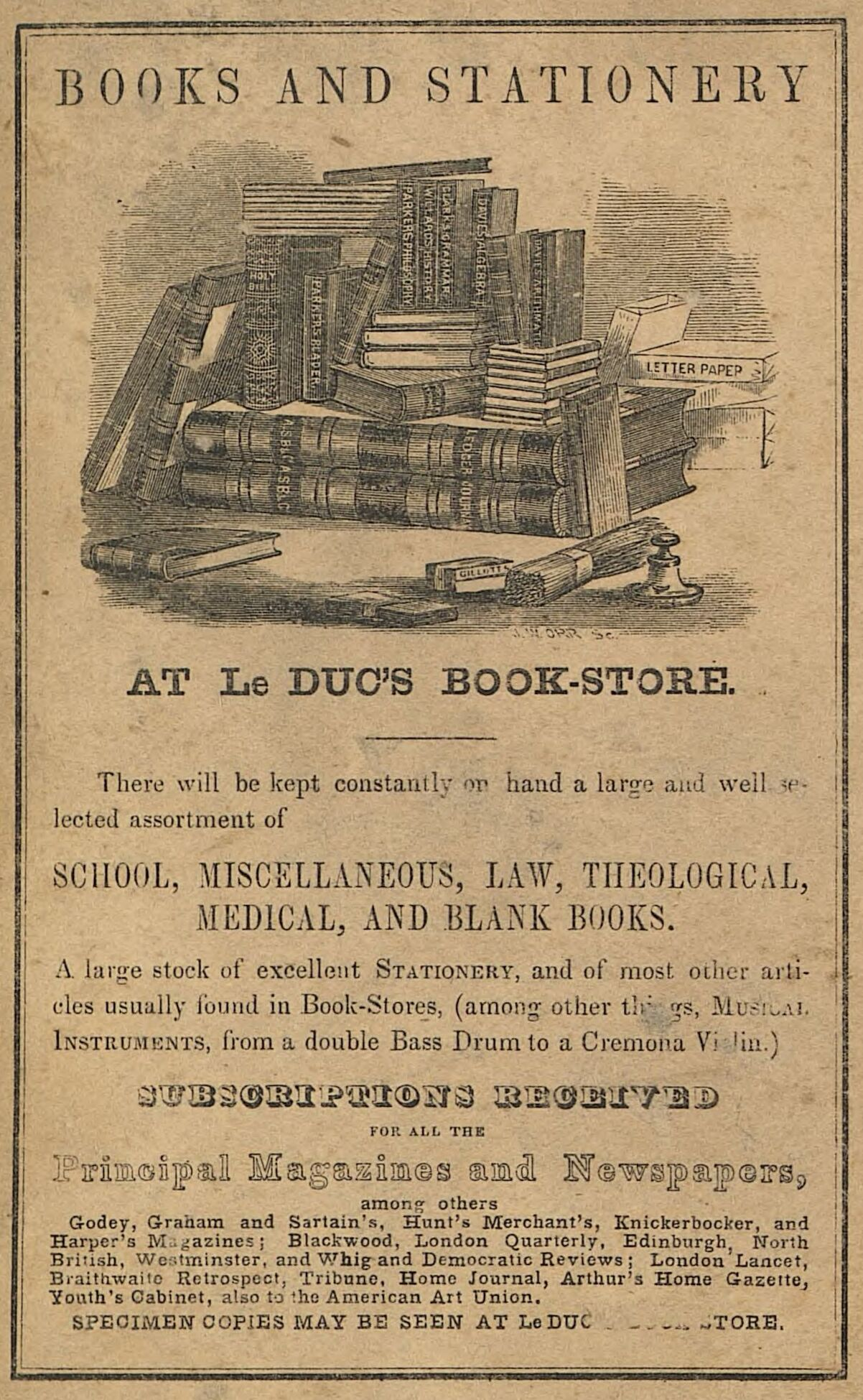
Advertisement for Le Duc's Bookstore, from Minnesota Year Book for 1851.

He moved to Saint Paul, Minnesota Territory, in 1850, reportedly with less than $100. Mary came to the city the following year. LeDuc either initially worked as a bookseller in the city and later began to practice law relating to the land office, or first practiced law and then opened a bookstore. He also sold merchandise in the city. The Star Tribune described LeDuc as "the state's first promoter." In 1851, he was present when the Treaty of Traverse des Sioux was signed. He published a Minnesota Year Book in 1851, 1852, and 1853. LeDuc was involved in planning West St. Paul, Minnesota.

In 1853, he was made commissioner for Minnesota to the Exhibition of the Industry of All Nations (the World's Fair in New York). With a grant of $300 from the territory, LeDuc gathered samples of common items in Minnesota, such as grain, fur pelts, mining items, and Native American items, including a "birch-bark canoe, beaded clothing and wild rice". He also took a bison to New York, leading it through the city to the location of the World's Fair. When the bison was crossing Fifth Avenue, it became excited and made a "dash toward the lamp post," leaving behind "a wrecked road wagon and a badly frightened horse flying up at the avenue ..." The exhibition was relatively successful, and LeDuc sold the bison to a zookeeper.

LeDuc worked to promote immigration to Minnesota, receiving the first charter for a railroad in the region (two companies that he was involved in the chartering of were the Mississippi and Lake Superior Railroad Company and the Louisiana and Minnesota Railroad Company of Saint Paul) and organizing the St. Paul Bridge Company to build the Wabasha Street Bridge over the Mississippi River. He was part of an expedition that followed Ojibwe Native Americans after they attacked Saint Paul in April 1853. LeDuc moved to Hastings, Minnesota in 1856 or 1857 and was a wheat grower and miller there, as well as engaging in land speculation. LeDuc organized the Hastings, Minnesota River, and Red River of the North Railroad Company to construct railroads to Hastings in 1856. He would serve as president of the company until 1870 and oversaw the construction of the Hastings and Dakota Railroad. In 1856 LeDuc and his wife began construction on a mansion (completed 1867), later named the "William G. LeDuc House" and listed on the National Register of Historic Places.

=== Civil War ===
LeDuc served in the American Civil War beginning in 1862, when he was made a lieutenant in the Quartermaster Corps. He aided George McClellan during the peninsular campaign. His service in building corduroy roads in the retreat before the Seven Days Battles was credited by the Minnesota Historical Society as having helped save "a considerable portion of the artillery". LeDuc continued to serve in the Army of the Potomac until after the Battle of Gettysburg, when he was transferred to the Western Army. In the Western Army, LeDuc was involved in the Chattanooga campaign, initially in command of the supplies at Bridgeport, Alabama. However, he soon realized that it would be difficult to efficiently transport supplies and organized the construction of a steamboat to transport supplies up the Tennessee River.

LeDuc also was present during the Atlanta campaign and the battle and capture of Atlanta. He was responsible for evacuating people from the city while Sherman razed it. He was then temporarily attached to the staff of George Henry Thomas and repaired a bridge during the Battle of Franklin. During the Battle of Nashville he accompanied John Schofield. When the Civil War ended in 1865, LeDuc was discharged at the rank of brevet brigadier general and returned to Hastings.

=== Later career and death ===
He unsuccessfully attempted to profitably mine in Utah. In 1877, Rutherford B. Hayes appointed LeDuc the fourth United States commissioner of agriculture. He took office on July 1, 1877. He reorganized the department, and while in office oversaw the establishment of a Division of Forestry as well as the groundwork for establishment of the Bureau of Animal Industry. LeDuc, who felt that agriculture was the "fundamental industry", advocated diversifying farming so that the United States could produce. "everything now imported from other nations." As such, he advocated the United States becoming self-sufficient in the production of tea and sugar, which made up the majority of America's agricultural imports, warning that the United States would go "to the devil on the down grade and with no brakes" if it did not grow its own sugar. While he initially thought that this sufficiency would come from increasing the production of cane sugar, LeDuc soon began to advocate making sorghum sugar and sugar from beets. He was similarly convinced that introducing tea farming to the nation would greatly benefit the nation, introducing it to several Southern states. His attempt to facilitate a tea industry was unsuccessful. He fought unsuccessfully to end Congressional seed distribution and left office in 1881.

In 1881 he was elected a member of the Agricultural Society of France. He was a member of the Minnesota Historical Society. LeDuc died at his home in Hastings on October 30, 1917.

== Bibliography ==
- Ives, Gideon S. (1919). "William Gates Le Duc" (PDF). Minnesota History Bulletin. 3 (2): 57–65. JSTOR 20160300.
- Miscellaneous Publications of the United States Department of Agriculture. U.S. Government Printing Office. 1937.
- Rogers, Ben F. (Autumn 1955). "William Gates Le Duc: Commissioner of Agriculture" (PDF). Minnesota History. 34 (7): 287–295. JSTOR 20175935.

Political offices
Preceded by Frederick Watts	United States Commissioner of Agriculture; 1877–1881	Succeeded by George B. Loring
