= Cumberland Valley Railroad Station and Station Master's House =

- U.S. National Register of Historic Places
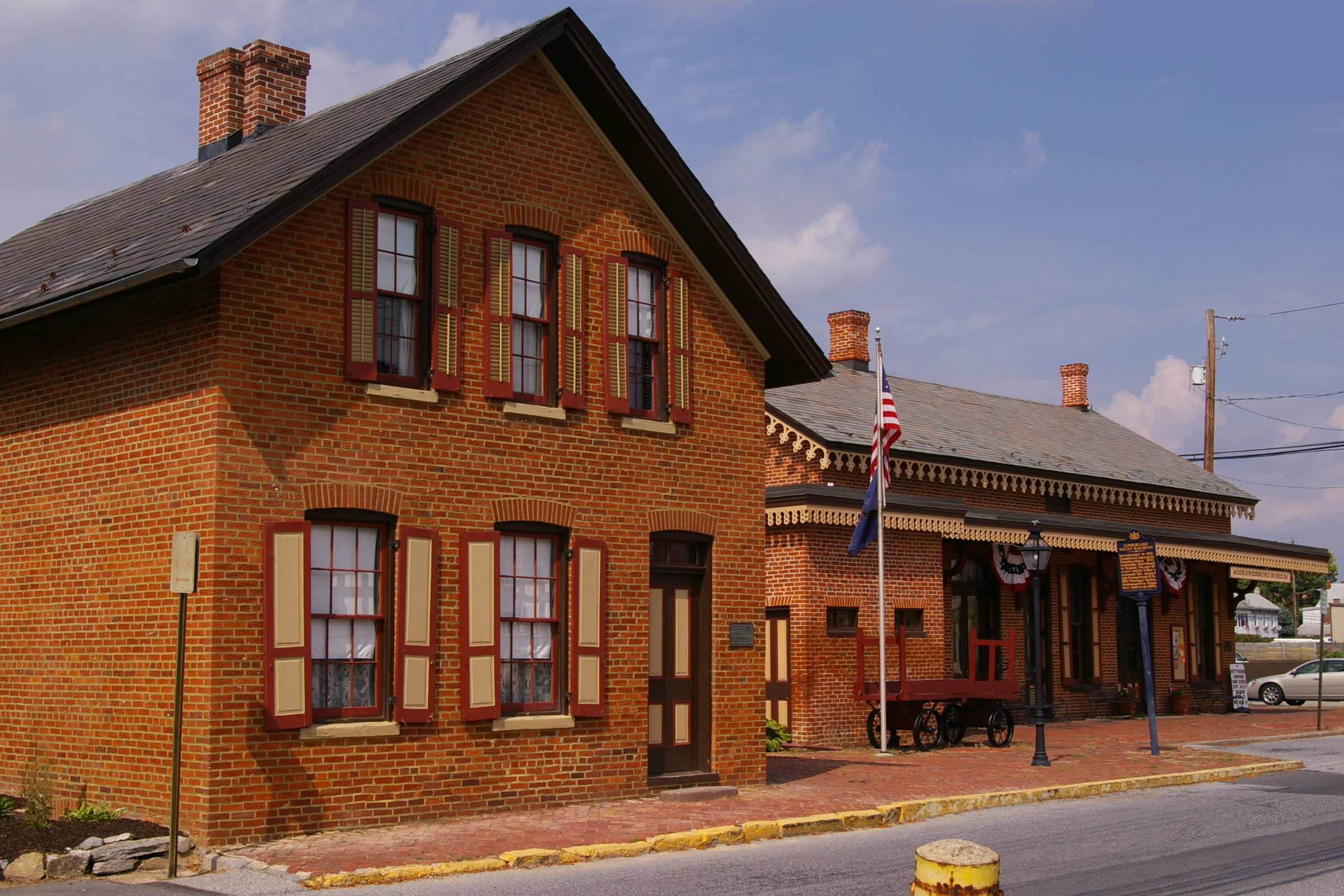
- Cumberland Valley Railroad Station, September 2013

- Location within Pennsylvania Location within the United States
- Location: 2 W. Strawberry Alley and 4 W. Strawberry Alley, Mechanicsburg, Pennsylvania
- Coordinates: 40°12′49″N 77°0′32″W
- Area: 0.1 acres (0.040 ha)
- Built: 1875
- NRHP reference No.: 78002384
- Added to NRHP: November 17, 1978

Cumberland Valley Railroad Station and Station Master's House, also known as the Mechanicsburg Railroad Station, is a historic railway station and house located at Mechanicsburg in Cumberland County, Pennsylvania. The station was erected about 1875 by the Cumberland Valley Railroad. It is a 1 1/2-story, brick building with a gable roof. It measures 52 feet by 27 feet. The station master's house is located adjacent to the station, and is a 2 1/2-story, brick building with a gable roof.

It was listed on the National Register of Historic Places in 1978.

The building now serves as the main museum and headquarters of the Mechanicsburg Museum Association.
