= Cumberland Valley Railroad Bridge =

Bridge in Harrisburg, Pennsylvania

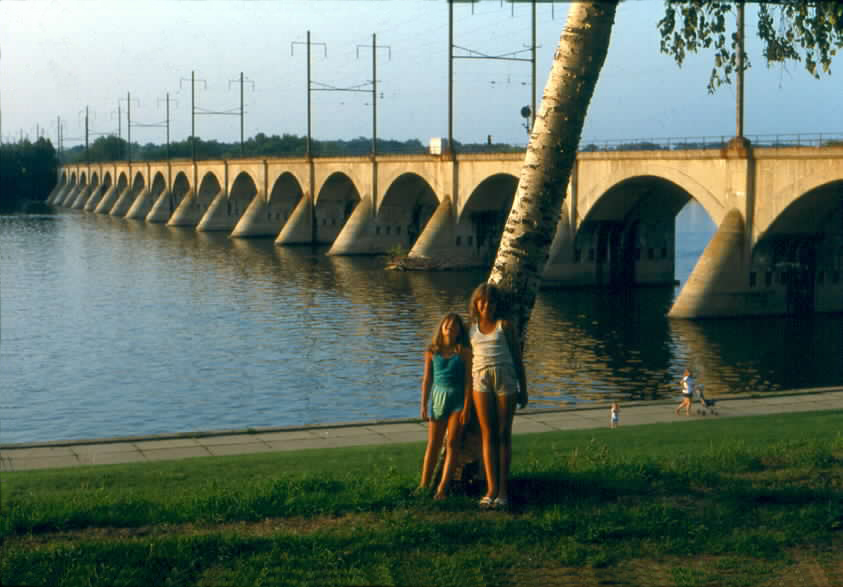
- Coordinates: 40.2523°N 76.8851°W
- Carries: vacant
- Crosses: Susquehanna River
- Locale: Cumberland County, Pennsylvania and Harrisburg, Pennsylvania

Location
- Interactive map of Cumberland Valley Railroad Bridge

The Cumberland Valley Railroad Bridge is a currently unused railroad bridge.

The bridge links downtown Harrisburg, City Island, and the western suburbs of Cumberland County, Pennsylvania. The bridge was originally constructed by the Cumberland Valley Railroad as part of the mainline from Harrisburg to Hagerstown via Chambersburg. The Cumberland Valley Railroad itself was leased as a subsidiary by the Pennsylvania Railroad.

The first crossing, a wooden covered bridge, began construction in the summer of 1836 and opened on January 16, 1839. It was destroyed by fire on December 4, 1844. The four eastern spans remained, but were washed away during the spring floods in 1846.

A second crossing in a slightly different location began construction on February 3, 1845, and was completed in 1846. This bridge had an upper deck for railroad traffic, and a lower deck for pedestrian and wagon traffic. Use of the lower deck was discontinued when the bridge was strengthened in 1850. The bridge's latticework timbers were removed and replaced with heavier braces from 1855 to 1856, and new wooden arches were built in 1872. From 1880 to 1886, the piers beneath the bridge were gradually replaced, allowing it to carry much heavier traffic.

Construction on an open iron truss bridge parallel to the existing wooden span began in September 1886. The work was done by the Union Bridge Company and the Edge Moore Bridge Company. The new bridge, whose eastern piers were 4 feet (1.2 m) higher than the old span's, opened in July 1887.

The present concrete structure was completed about 1916, and President Woodrow Wilson was one of the first to travel over the newly constructed bridge. Traffic on the bridge ceased in the late 1980s after the Cumberland Valley Railroad was purchased by Conrail. Although the majority of the bridge has been abandoned for rail use, other uses for the bridge have been suggested, such as becoming the principal crossing for the Corridor One rail commuter system to serve the renewed rail needs of the metropolitan area and of Harrisburg's west shore. Alternate ideas have also included opening the bridge solely for express bus and emergency vehicle traffic. Two of these are the railroads on either side which continue to operate on the tracks immediately off of the bridge on either side. The third owner is Capital Area Transit which currently does not own any property with immediate access to the bridge. Immediately to the south of the Cumberland Valley Bridge, a similar iron truss structure was erected in 1891 by the Reading Company, originally known as the Philadelphia and Reading Railroad.

As of 2026, advocates are pushing for commuter rail service to be established between Carlisle and Harrisburg, the latter of which would use the bridge.

== See also ==
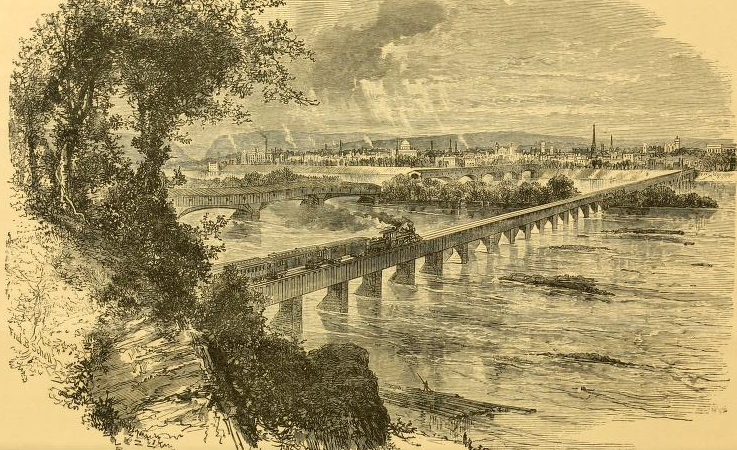
The bridge c.1881

- List of crossings of the Susquehanna River

== Bibliography ==
- Egle, William Henry (1891). Notes and Queries: Chiefly Relating to Interior Pennsylvania. Third Series, Volume II. Harrisburg, Pa.: Daily Telegraph Printers.
