= American Seed Trade Association =

U.S. trade organization

Members of ASTA’s Executive Committee in a meeting with Secretary of Agriculture Sonny Perdue in Washington D.C, September 19, 2019

Founded in 1883, the American Seed Trade Association (ASTA) is one of the oldest trade organizations in the United States. Its membership consists of over 700 companies involved in seed production and distribution, plant breeding, and related industries in North America. As an authority on plant germplasm, ASTA advocates science and policy issues related to the development, marketing and movement of seed, associated products and services throughout the world.

== Membership ==
ASTA’s membership roster includes active members that are directly involved in seed production or distribution and research and development; corresponding members that produce or distribute seed outside of North America; affiliate members that are related associations and agencies; reciprocal members; and associate members that provide products or services for the seed industry. Ninety-five percent of ASTA’s active members are small businesses that report annual sales of less than $15 million. Most active, affiliate, and associate members of ASTA are headquartered in North America, predominantly in the United States. ASTA values and promotes diversity of membership, in terms of company size, products and geographic area served. Each member company is given one vote, regardless of size.

== Initiatives ==
Among ASTA’s many current initiatives to serve the seed industry are:

The Guide to Seed Treatment Stewardship – In partnership with CropLife America, ASTA has developed a comprehensive guide for the safe handling and transport of treated seed to prevent potential risks to the environment.

First the Seed Foundation (FTSF) — FTSF is a not-for-profit organization established in 2008 by ASTA to inform today’s consumers and tomorrow’s workforce about the importance of the seed industry. Its mission is to conduct education, outreach and communication on the value [of crops and food produced from seed.

Seed Advocate – ASTA launched a national recruitment campaign to mobilize a grassroots force of seed industry activists, known as Seed Advocates, to promote seed-friendly legislation and regulation at the state and federal levels.

Future Seed Executives (FuSE) — FuSE is an official Sub-Committee of the American Seed Trade Association’s (ASTA) Management Skills Committee. Since its formal inception in 2004, the FuSE Initiative has focused on educating and supporting future seed industry executives, namely those with fewer than seven years of seed industry experience. Programs are designed as regional opportunities to expand learning, cultivate management skills, promote networking, and improve general understanding of the seed industry.

In 2014, the ASTA attended a lobby meeting with the European Seed Association (ESA) and the official US and EU delegations to discuss the industry's interest in the ongoing Transatlantic Trade and Investment Partnership (TTIP) negotiations.

== Leadership ==
ASTA is driven by its membership, which is represented by a board of directors composed of a 15-member executive committee, all past-presidents of the association, division chairs, up to three directors-at-large, chairs of the International and Legislative & Legal Concerns Committees, and ASTA representatives to the Canadian Seed Trade Association and Mexican Seed Trade Association. The executive committee is composed of the association’s president, first vice president and second vice president; three most recent past-presidents; regional vice presidents, representing U.S. northeast, southeast, southern, central, north central, northwestern and western regions; and vice presidents from Canada and Mexico.

The current chairman of the ASTA Board is Bryan Gerard of JoMar Seeds. Andrew W. LaVigne has been the president and chief executive officer of ASTA since 2005.

== Annual meetings ==
ASTA hosts several industry meetings every year:

The Corn & Sorghum Seed Research Conference (CSS); Soybean Seed Research Conference: and Seed Expo First held in the mid-1900s, ASTA’s annual CSS & Seed Expo draws seed breeders, growers and distributors and seed equipment manufacturers to Chicago each December for a major sales and information exchange.

The Vegetable & Flower Seed Conference For over 50 years, produce and floral seed industry professionals have been meeting each January – in various Southern and Western resort locations – to exchange research information, to discuss policies and regulations, and to sell and purchase seed.

Farm & Lawn Seed Conference ASTA’s annual fall conference in Kansas City is held in conjunction with the Western Seed Association’s annual meeting.
