= R. H. Shumway =

American seed company, and founder information

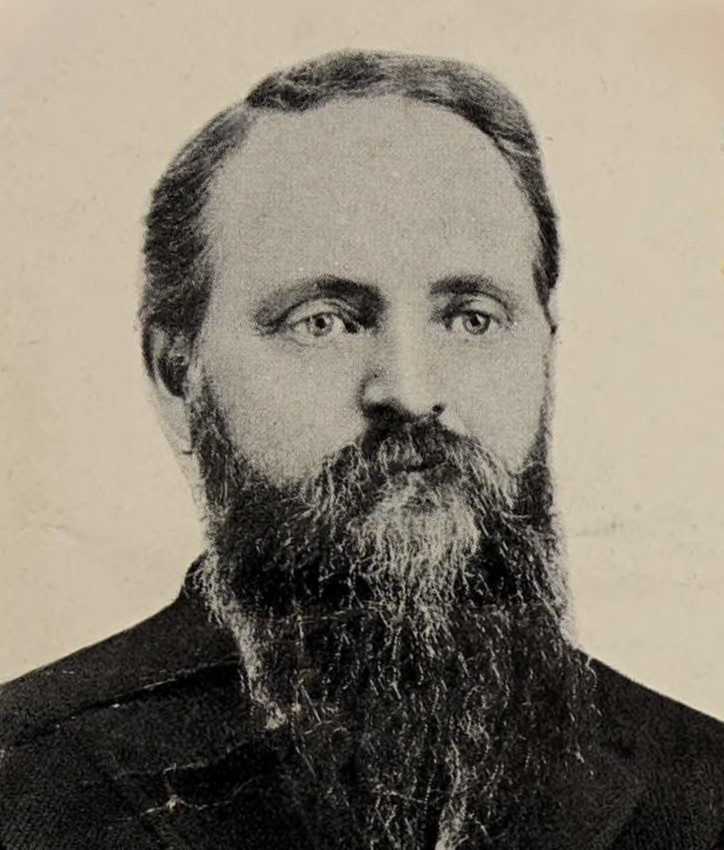
R. H. Shumway

Roland H. Shumway (July 26, 1842 – December 30, 1925) was the founder of the mail-order seed company R. H. Shumway, at one time the largest seed company in the world. He has been called "The Pioneer Seedsman".

== Early life ==
Shumway was born July 26, 1842, at his family farm in Kishwaukee, Illinois. At the age of 19, he was enlisted and served in Illinois forces (there being no national standing army until World War I) during the American Civil War. Two years later, he re-enlisted in the 50th Illinois Volunteer. Between enlistments, he married Emma Davis in 1864, and together they had four sons and two daughters. He was discharged in 1865.

== Seed company ==
In 1870, he founded the R. H. Shumway seed company on his farm in Rockford, Illinois. By 1881 his company was expanding, so the company relocated to South First street in order to accommodate larger facilities. By his death in 1925, it was the largest in the world, shipping 200,000 catalogues per year.

== Death and legacy ==
Shumway died in Rockford on the evening of December 30, 1925 from injuries suffered after being hit by an automobile three days prior. After his death, his son Myron Shumway assumed responsibilities of the company. M. Raymond "Ray" Shumway ran the large mail-order business until he died of heart disease on March 16, 1933.

In the 1980s the rights to the name were purchased and, after some effort to publicly rediscover the lines of seeds once carried, began operation, continuing to this day. Today the R.H. Seed Company name (along with Seymour's Select Seeds, Totally Tomatoes, Vermont Bean Seed Company, and HPS) belongs to the J.W. Jung Seed Company.
