= Simpson Street School =

- U.S. National Register of Historic Places
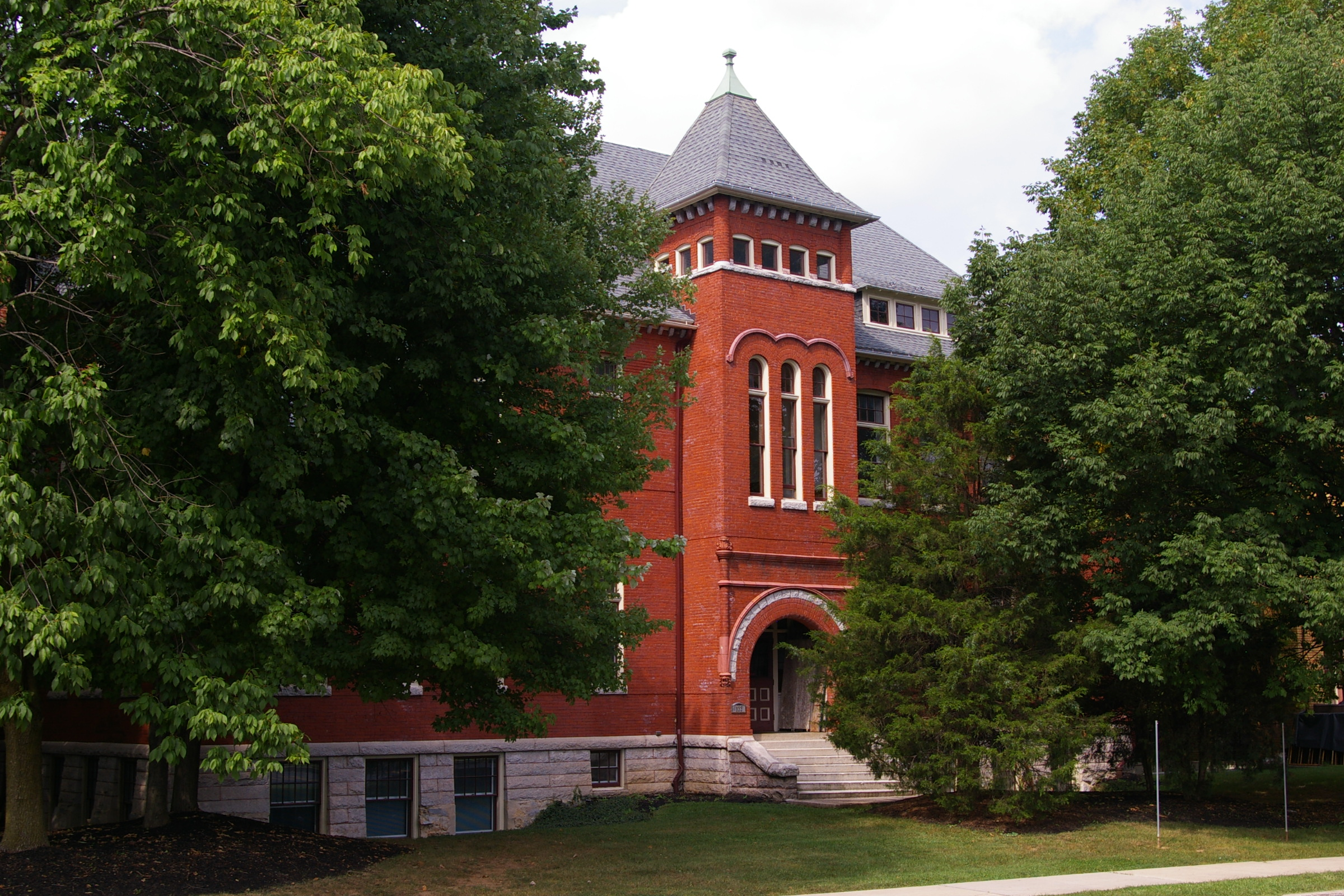
- Simpson Street School, September 2013

- Location within Pennsylvania Location within the United States
- Location: Simpson & High Sts., Mechanicsburg, Pennsylvania
- Coordinates: 40°12′39″N 77°00′39″W
- Area: 1.9 acres (0.77 ha)
- Built: 1892
- Architect: Smith, J.C.; Lappley, Clayton
- Architectural style: Late Gothic Revival, Romanesque
- NRHP reference No.: 83002233
- Added to NRHP: February 24, 1983

The Simpson Street School is an historic school complex in Mechanicsburg in Cumberland County, Pennsylvania, United States.

It was listed on the National Register of Historic Places in 1983.

== History and architectural features ==
This complex consists of a Romanesque Revival-style building that was built in 1892, and two Late Gothic Revival-style buildings that were added during the 1920s. The 1892 building is square in plan, two-and-one-half-story structure with a raised basement. It was built using pressed brick and features three ornate projecting entrances. The addition was built in two phases, in 1926 and 1929. It is a two-story structure that was built using yellow brick with brownstone trim. It was used as a high school until 1957, then as a junior high until 1981, when it was sold by the school district.
