= Mechanicsburg Commercial Historic District (Mechanicsburg, Pennsylvania) =

Historic district in Pennsylvania, United States

- U.S. National Register of Historic Places
- U.S. Historic district
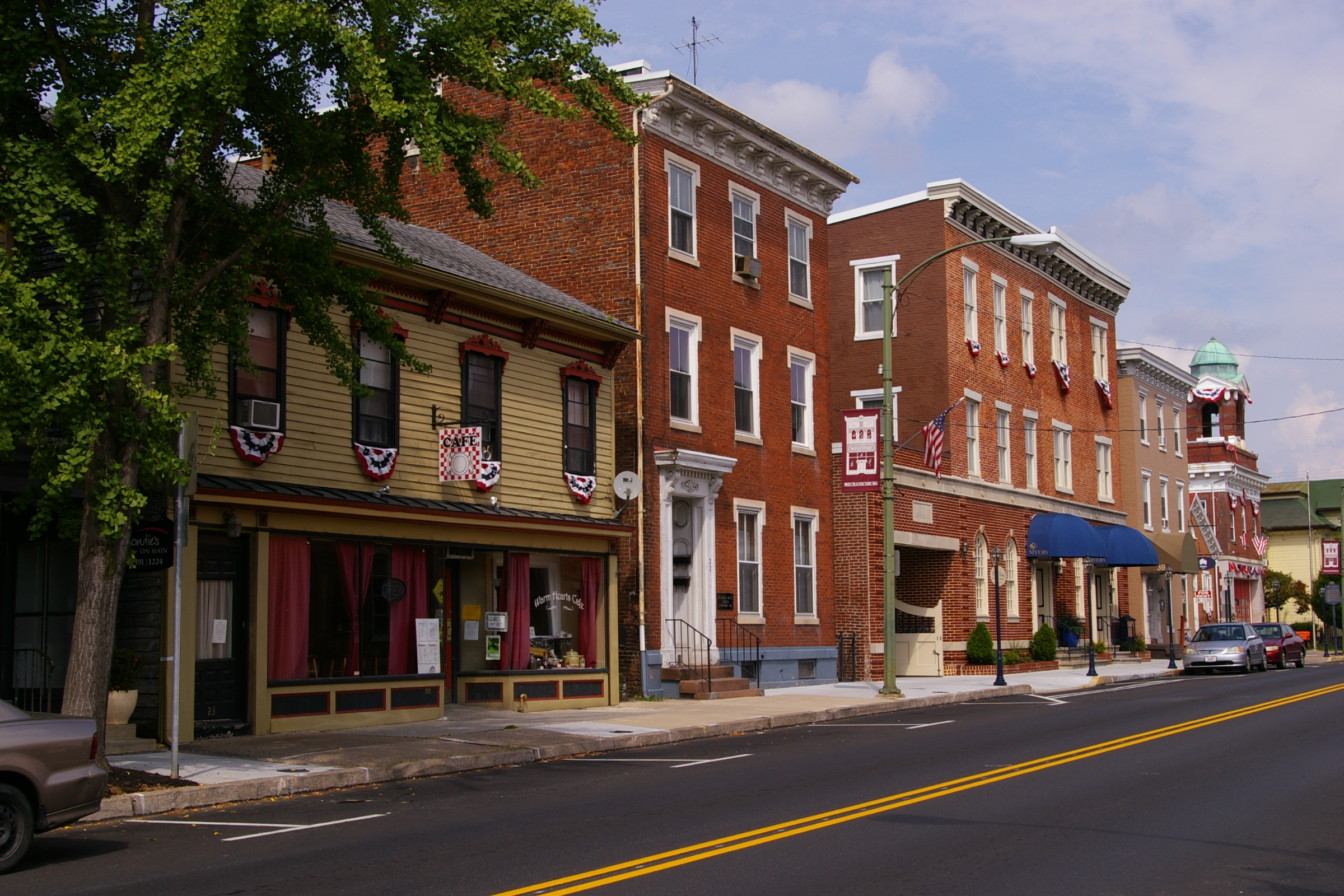

- Location within Pennsylvania Location within the United States
- Location: Main St. from Arch to High St., Mechanicsburg, Pennsylvania
- Coordinates: 40°12′46″N 77°0′33″W
- Area: 16.7 acres (6.8 ha)
- Architect: Multiple
- Architectural style: Late Victorian, Georgian
- NRHP reference No.: 83002232
- Added to NRHP: April 21, 1983

The Mechanicsburg Commercial Historic District is a national historic district located at Mechanicsburg, Cumberland County, Pennsylvania. The district includes 91 contributing buildings in the central business district of Mechanicsburg. Most of the contributing buildings date to the 19th century and includes notable examples of the Late Victorian and Georgian styles. Notable buildings include two churches, two banks, and the police department.

It was added to the National Register of Historic Places in 1983.

== Notable buildings ==
The Mechanicsburg Commercial Historic District encompasses 91 contributing buildings in the central business district of Mechanicsburg. Most of the contributing buildings date to the 19th century and includes notable examples of the Late Victorian and Georgian styles. Notable buildings include two churches, two banks, and the police department.
