= Robert W. Fish =

American politician (1897–1982)

Member of the Pennsylvania House of Representatives from the Cumberland County district
- In office 1947–1948

Personal details
- Born: Robert Warren Fish; August 4, 1897 Mechanicsburg, Pennsylvania, U.S.
- Died: July 12, 1982 (aged 84) Carlisle, Pennsylvania, U.S.
- Resting place: Saint John's Cemetery; Shiremanstown, Pennsylvania, U.S.
- Party: Republican
- Spouse: A. Catherine (died 1973)
- Children: 2
- Education: Blackstone Institute of Law
- Occupation: Politician

Robert Warren Fish (August 4, 1897 – July 12, 1982) was an American politician from Pennsylvania. He served in the Pennsylvania House of Representatives from 1947 to 1948.

== Early life ==
Robert Warren Fish was born on August 4, 1897, in Mechanicsburg, Pennsylvania. He graduated from Alexander Hamilton Business School and Blackstone Institute of Law.

== Career ==
Fish was commissioned as a lieutenant in the U.S. Army during World War I. He served in Dijon, France. He was elected as a Republican to the Pennsylvania House of Representatives, representing Cumberland County from 1947 to 1948. He worked for Mack Trucks.

== Personal life ==
Fish married A. Catherine "Kitty". They had two daughters, Josephine and Marian. His wife died in 1973. He lived in Mechanicsburg throughout his life and was a member of Mechanicsburg Presbyterian Church. He was president of the Mechanicsburg Hunting Camp.

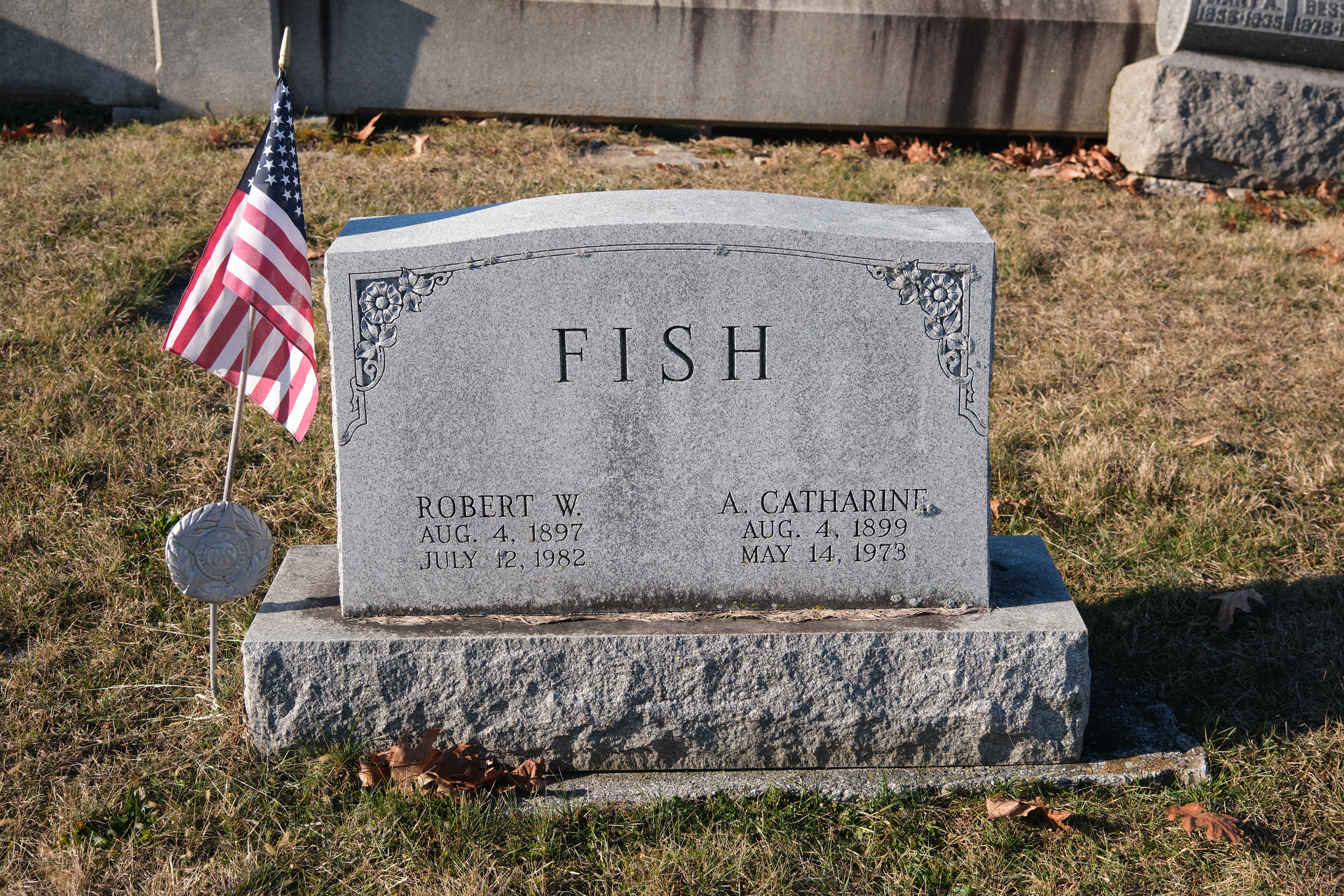
Grave of Fish at Saint John's Cemetery

Fish died on July 12, 1982, at Carlisle Hospital in Carlisle. He was buried in Saint John's Cemetery in Shiremanstown.
