= Euroseeds =

- Abbreviation: Euroseeds
- Formation: November 2000
- Type: Non-profit association
- Purpose: Representing members in the plant breeding, agriculture, and biotechnology industries
- Headquarters: Brussels, Belgium
- Region served: European Union, European Economic Area
- President: Michael Gohn
- Secretary General: Garlich von Essen
- Website: www.euroseeds.eu

Euroseeds is a non-profit association for the seed industry in the European Union and the European Economic Area. An umbrella organization of national seed associations and individual seed companies, their members represent all aspects of the European seed industry including research, plant breeding, and the production and marketing of seeds of agricultural, horticultural and ornamental plant species. It was founded in November 2000 and was granted the legal status of international non-profit International Association (AISBL) according to Belgian law in April 2002. Its headquarters are located in Brussels, Belgium.

== History ==
Following increasing inter-organizational cooperation begun in 1998, four separate European seed trade associations were merged into a single organization, at that time ESA, in 2000. They were COSEMCO (seed trade, founded in 1961), ASSOPOMAC (potato breeders, founded in 1964), AMUFOC (forage seed production, founded in 1970) and COMASSO (plant breeders, founded in 1977).

== Functions and scope of activities ==
According to the Euroseeds' mission statement, it is "the voice of the European seed industry and represents companies and national organisations active in research, breeding, production and marketing of seeds of agricultural, horticultural and ornamental plant species." Euroseeds represents the European seed industry to European institutions (European Commission, European Parliament, Council of Ministers) as well as the EU's Community Plant Variety Office (CPVO) and numerous European and international bodies and organisations. Euroseeds serves as a lobby group for all seed industry-related issues in the European Union and European Economic Area and specifically on:

- Seed marketing
- Plant breeding
- Intellectual property rights such as plant breeders's rights and biotech patents
- Plant and seed health such as phytosanitary rules and seed treatments
- Biodiversity and access to genetic resources
- Land use and food production
- Competitiveness of the EU agri-food chain
- working on collective problems of its membership such as market access in other countries

=== Observer status ===
Euroseeds has been granted observer status with the following organizations:

- International Seed Federation (ISF)
- International Union for the Protection of New Varieties of Plants (UPOV)
- Organisation for Economic Co-operation and Development (OECD)
- International Seed Testing Association (ISTA)
- International Plant Protection Convention (IPPC)
- Food and Agriculture Organization (FAO)

== Events ==
Each year in October, Euroseeds holds its Congress which is attended by around 900 participants from industry as well as policy makers, representatives of the European Commission, the EU's Community Plant Variety Office, and international organizations such as UPOV, FAO OECD, the International Seed Testing Association (ISTA).

== Membership ==
Euroseeds represents over 100 members out of which 34 are national seed associations from EU Members States and the wider Europe. Next to these association members, Euroseeds' membership also comprises 67 individual direct company members, both multi-national as well as specialised small and medium-sized enterprises (SMEs), and 33 associate members from seed related industries, media and academia and from outside of Europe.

== Euroseeds presidents ==
2000–2003	Anthony Keeling, Elsoms Seeds Ltd. (UK)
2003–2006	Sten Moberg, Svalöf Weibull (Sweden)
2006–2009	Francois Desprez, Florimond Desprez (France)
2009–2012	Christoph Amberger, KWS Saat AG (Germany)
2012–2015	Gerard Backx, HZPC (the Netherlands)
2015–2018	Nigel Moore, KWS SAAT SE (UK)
2018-2021	Régis Fournier, Limagrain Field Seeds (France)
2021-	Michael Gohn (Austria)
