= Richters Herbs =

Canadian seed company

Richters Herbs is a Canadian nursery and seed company based in Goodwood, Ontario. Richters is one of the top suppliers of herbs in Canada.

== History ==
Richters was founded as a flower and garden center in 1967 by Waltraut and Otto Richter. Waltraut and Otto moved from Austria to Canada in the 1950s. After they began growing their own herbs, a 1969 feature article in the Toronto Star brought them wide attention. They sent out their first catalogue in 1970. In early years, they did business as Otto Richter and Sons.

Otto is a trained horticulturist. Waltraut ran the business, assisted by their son, Conrad, who has a master's degree in botany

Originally located in Locust Hill, Ontario, Waltraut and Otto moved the herb operation to Goodwood in 1975 after their farm was expropriated for the planned development of Seaton. The financial impact forced them to reduce their 29,000 square feet (2,700 m^{2}) of greenhouses to 6,000 square feet (560 m^{2}), devastating their bedding plant business.

The company pivoted to focus on herbs in the mid-1980s and began adding commercial growers to their client list.

== Operations ==
Richters offers seeds for both culinary and medicinal herbs. All plants sold by Richters are grown in its greenhouses or on its site. By 1989, Richters had increased their greenhouse space to more than 20,000 square metres (220,000 sq ft).

The headquarters is located east of Toronto. It has distributors in Australia, Germany, and Israel.

The company has certifications to allow it to export seeds and plants to the United States, and approximately 25 percent of the company's sales are to American customers. Richters will attempt to ship anywhere in the world.

The catalogue provides educational content about the uses of herbs. To expand the varieties of herbs the company can offer, Conrad established seed collection agencies in Nepal, Ghana, China, and Ecuador in the 1980s. They also have a Chinese herbal researcher on staff. By 2000, Richters carried 800 varieties of herbs.

As of 2019, Conrad is president of the company. He travels globally to locate herbs that can be grown successfully in Canada. Conrad has supported regulation of herb growers, pointing to Australia for an example of "workable rules for regulating medicinal herbs".
