= Cumberland Valley Railroad =

Early railroad in Pennsylvania, U.S.

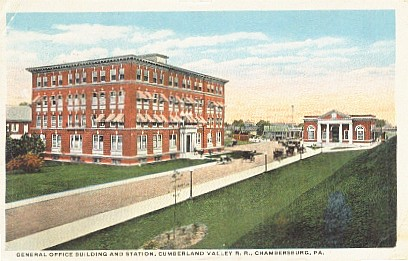
- CVRR station and offices in Chambersburg, Pennsylvania

Overview
- Headquarters: Chambersburg, Pennsylvania, U.S.
- Reporting mark: CVRR
- Locale: U.S. states of Pennsylvania, Maryland, Virginia and West Virginia
- Dates of operation: 1837–1919
- Successor: Pennsylvania Railroad

Technical
- Track gauge: 4 ft 8 1/2 in (1,435 mm) standard gauge
CVRR route map in 1919

The Cumberland Valley Railroad (reporting mark CVRR) was an early railroad in Pennsylvania, United States, originally chartered in 1831 to connect with Pennsylvania's Main Line of Public Works. Freight and passenger service in the Cumberland Valley in south central Pennsylvania from near Harrisburg to Chambersburg began in 1837, with service later extended to Hagerstown, Maryland, and then extending into the Shenandoah Valley to Winchester, Virginia. It employed up to 1,800 workers.

During the American Civil War the line had strategic importance in supplying Union troops in the Shenandoah Valley. It also ran the first passenger sleeping car in the U.S. on the Chambersburg-Harrisburg route in 1839. The Pennsylvania Railroad (PRR) gained control of the CVRR as early as 1859, and officially purchased it on June 2, 1919. The PRR's successor, the Penn Central, closed all railway facilities in Chambersburg in 1972 and its successor, Conrail, abandoned major pieces of the line in 1981.

== History ==
The Cumberland Valley Railroad Company was chartered by the Pennsylvania Legislature on April 2, 1831, to construct a railroad from Carlisle to a point on the Susquehanna River at or near Harrisburg. This charter expired, but it was renewed on April 15, 1835, allowing the road to be built from the Susquehanna River to Chambersburg. On June 27, 1835, Thomas Grubb McCullough was elected as the first President of the road, and in August, William Milner Roberts was selected as Chief Engineer.

The initial cost of building the road, including a bridge across the Susquehanna, was estimated before construction at $564,064, and the average annual receipts of the road at $284,617.50, calculated at 100 passengers each way per day at 3 cents per mile, and 35,000 tons of through freight and 51,950 tons of local freight, at 4½ cents per ton per mile. $642,000 was raised by local stock subscription and construction began in the Spring of 1836.

The railroad opened for travel from White Hill, near Harrisburg to Carlisle in August 1837, and through to Chambersburg in November, 1837. The first locomotive, built by William Norris in Philadelphia, had two driving wheels, wooden spokes, and was named "Cumberland Valley,"

The passenger cars carried 14 passengers each and were bought used from the Philadelphia and Columbia Railroad, according to the 1887 "History of Franklin County Pennsylvania." The railroad track was constructed of cross ties laid 4.5 feet (1.4 m)apart without ballast, with 5 in × 9 in (130 mm × 230 mm) oak stringers serving as rails. Iron bar, 0.625 inches (15.9 mm) thick by 2.25 inches (57 mm) wide, was spiked to the top of the stringers. When service began to Chambersburg, the iron was not laid for the last 3 miles (4.8 km) and the cars were run in on the wooden stringers.

The first Cumberland Valley Railroad Bridge across the Susquehanna was opened for travel on January 16, 1839. The first regular passenger service to Philadelphia, via the Harrisburg, Portsmouth, Mount Joy and Lancaster Railroad, began on February 1, 1839, with the following schedule:

Leave Chambersburg at 4 o'clock in the morning; Arrive at Harrisburg at 8, at Lancaster at 12, at Philadelphia before 6 P.M. Returning it will leave Harrisburg as soon as the cars from Philadelphia arrived, about 5 o'clock in the evening and arrive at Chambersburg at 10 P.M.

== Innovation ==
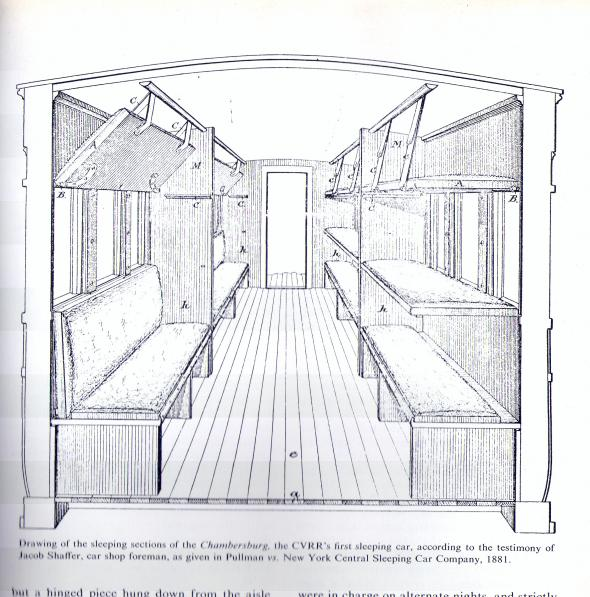
The first American sleeping car, the "Chambersburg" started service on the CVRR in 1839

The Cumberland Valley Railroad pioneered the use of sleeping cars in the spring of 1839, a first on any American railroad, with a car named "Chambersburg." The berths were upholstered boards, in three rows, one above the other, held by leather straps, and in the daytime were folded back against the walls. A couple of years later a second car, the "Carlisle," was introduced into service.

Passengers traveling from Pittsburgh to Philadelphia traveled by horse drawn stage for 36 hours to get to Chambersburg, arriving about midnight, then left by rail about 1 am, arriving at Harrisburg about 5 am, in time to catch a HPMt.J&L train to Philadelphia.

"The History of Franklin County Pennsylvania" also claims that the first locomotive cab was constructed in the CVRR shops in Chambersburg in 1841 for a Franklin Railroad locomotive, named "Washington."

== Growth ==
In 1839 the CVRR bought three locomotives for $21,250 and two passenger cars for $4,175, and ran two passenger trains and one freight train each day between Chambersburg and Harrisburg. They boasted that no passenger had been injured in the 2½ years that the road had been operated.

Frederick Watts was elected the third president of the CVRR in 1841 and served in the post for 32 years. He reported that total annual earnings were $70,116.82 for 1842. By 1849, annual earnings were $101,084.77, and tonnage hauled was reported for the first time, totaling 37,439 tons, including 7,818 tons of flour, 5,126 of iron ore, 4,247 of coal, 2,123 of grain, and 2,237 of lumber. In that year plans were made to reconstruct the track with heavy iron rails.

External videos
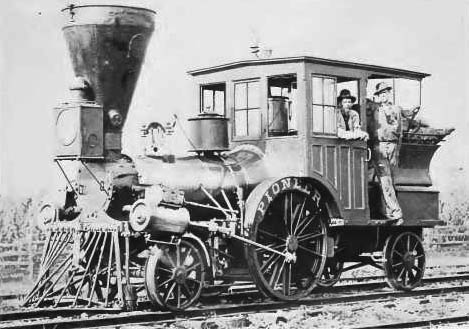
- The locomotive "Pioneer"
- B&O Railroad and the Civil War, 19:15-20:30, C-SPAN

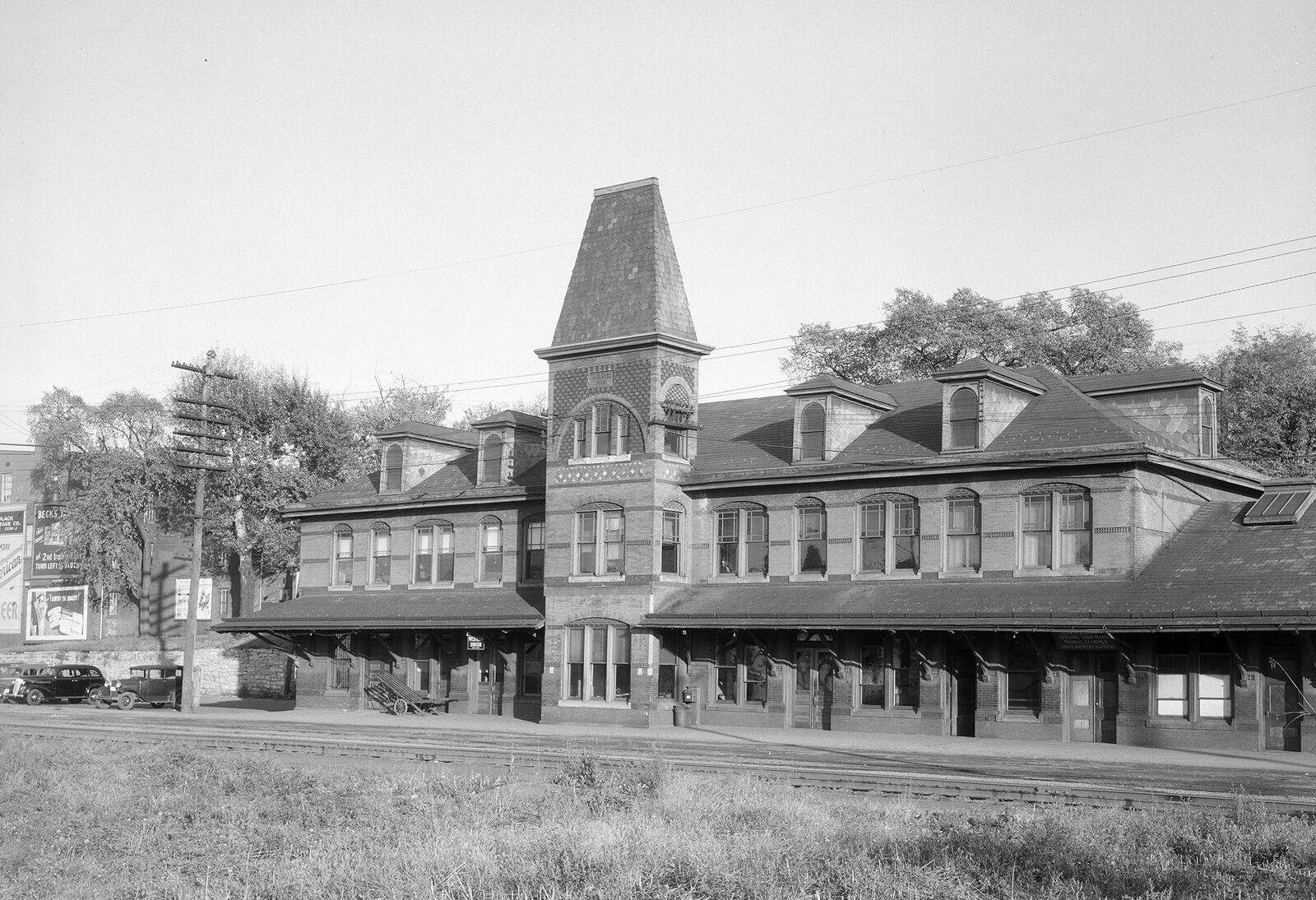
Hagerstown station, built c. 1883

In March 1832, the Franklin Railroad was chartered by the Pennsylvania Legislature, and on January 16, 1837, by the Legislature of Maryland. The road was built from Chambersburg to Greencastle, Pennsylvania, in 1837, and to Hagerstown, Maryland in 1841. It owned its own steam locomotives, but these were sold about 1841, when the CVRR began operating the road. Horse power, rather than steam power, was used during the 1840s and 1850s. Ownership and operating rights changed hands several times, until 1860 when the track was rebuilt with heavy rails and the CVRR contracted to operate the track. In 1865 the two railroads were merged.

Daniel Tyler was hired in 1850 to supervise the line's rebuilding. He hired Alba Smith as superintendent of the machinery shop in 1850. Smith served as superintendent of the railway from 1851 to 1856, and helped introduce lighter-weight "single-wheel" locomotives on the line. These locomotives included the Pioneer and the Jenny Lind, bought in 1851, and the Boston and Enterprise bought in 1853–54. In 1999, the Pioneer was moved from its display at the Smithsonian Institution in Washington, D.C. to the as yet unopened National Museum of Industrial History in Bethlehem, Pennsylvania. (The locomotive was later moved to the Baltimore and Ohio Railroad Museum in Baltimore, Maryland.)

The CVRR timetable in 1916

In October 1862, the Confederate forces destroyed railway buildings in Chambersburg, and on June 15, 1863, during the Gettysburg campaign, they destroyed all company property in the town, and tore up five miles (8.0 km) of Franklin Railroad. In July, 1864 Confederate raiders led by Jubal Early returned and burned the greater part of Chambersburg including most railroad property.

During the 1870s feeder lines such as the Mont Alto Railroad were added in the Cumberland Valley to gain access to iron ore deposits. In 1873 the railroad extended south from Hagerstown to the Potomac River, and reached Martinsburg, West Virginia via the Martinsburg and Potomac Railroad. The Mechanicsburg Pennsylvania Railroad Station was built about 1875. In 1889, the Martinsburg and Potomac's line was extended to Winchester, Virginia, at the head of the Shenandoah Valley, under the Cumberland Valley and Potomac Railway, to be operated by the CVRR. The Cumberland Valley was to have a junction with the South Pennsylvania Railroad in Newville, but the ambitious South Penn ran into financial difficulties during its construction and was never completed.

In June 1882, the Shenandoah Valley Railroad was opened from Hagerstown to Roanoke, Virginia. In conjunction with the Norfolk and Western Railway the CVRR operated the middle link of the New York-Harrisburg-Hagerstown-Roanoke, Va. passenger trains. Trains reportedly traveled at over 90 mph on parts of this route.

== South Penn Branch Line ==
The South Penn Branch was a line that connected the CVRR main line to an iron furnace near Cowans Gap. It left the line near Marion and went to Richmond Furnace, a distance of 26 miles (42 km). This route was one possible route for a cross-Pennsylvania main line, rejected in favor of the route along the Juniata River.

== Demise ==
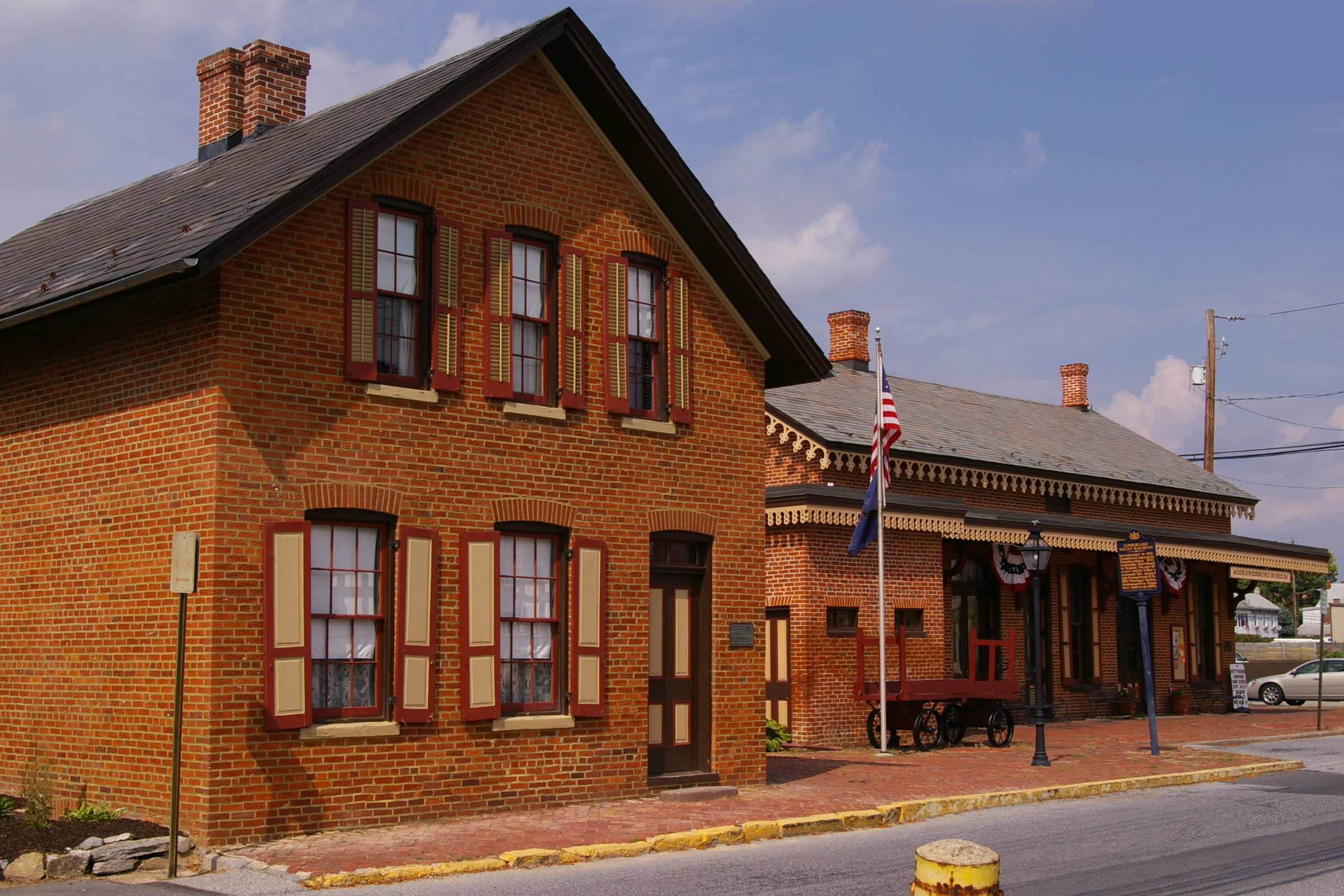
Mechanicsburg Station, built c. 1875

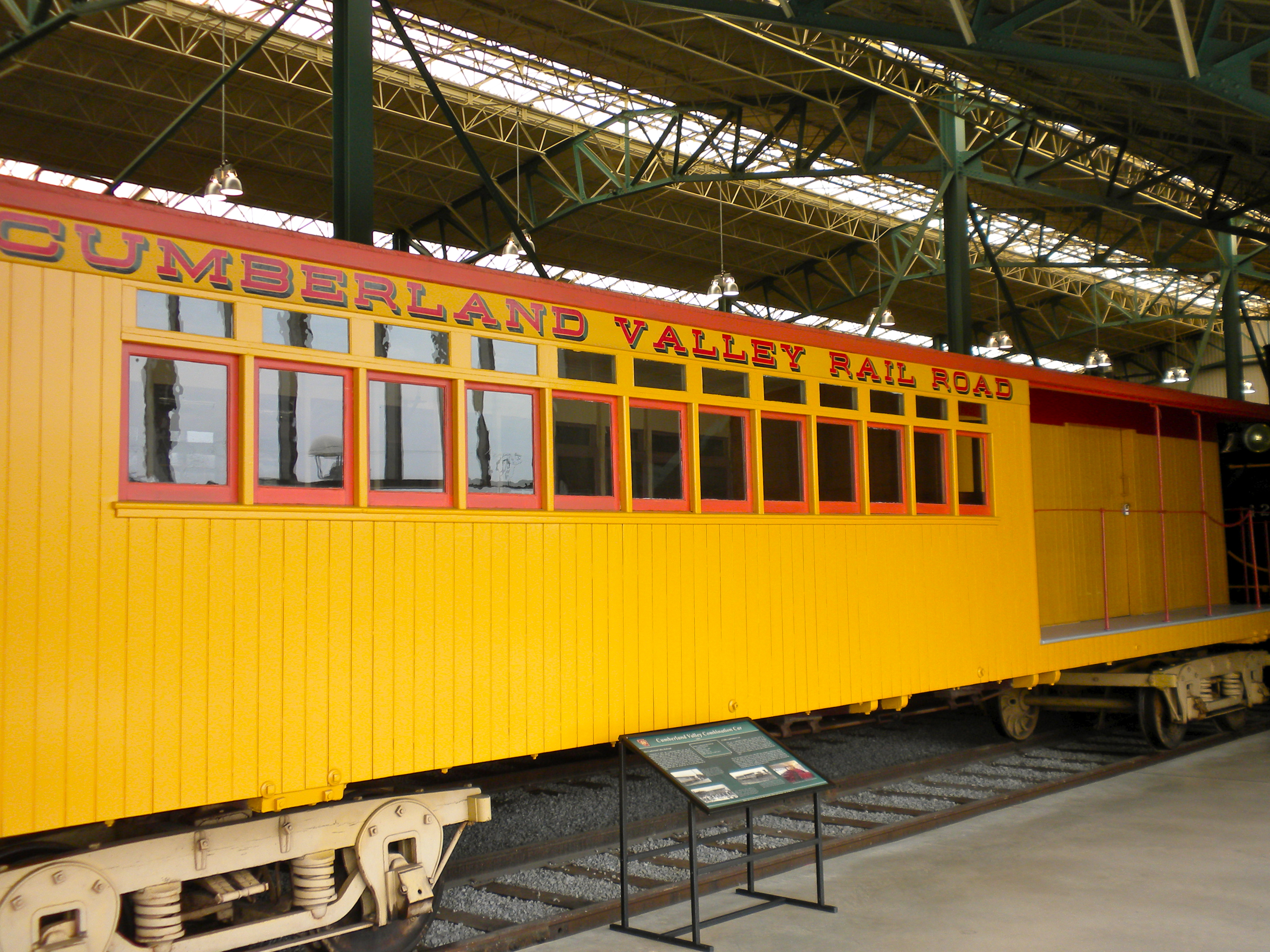
A combined passenger and baggage car, with particularly unusual side vestibule, built in 1855 in Chambersburg, now on the National Register of Historic Places

Regular passenger train service on the CVRR ended in 1952, the last New York-Roanoke train ran in 1961. The PRR's successor, the Penn Central, closed all railway facilities in Chambersburg in 1972.

Its successor, Conrail, first renamed what had been known as the Cumberland Valley Branch with three names: Shippensburg Secondary Track (Harrisburg to PENNROAD, south-east of Shippensburg); Hagerstown Secondary Track (from the Reading junction north-east of Shippensburg, through PENNROAD, to TOWN and HAGER towers in Hagerstown); and Winchester Secondary Track. Conrail later (1979–1980) abandoned the southern half of the Shippensburg Secondary (from the west side of Carlisle to Shippensburg, including street-running trackage on Earl St. in the latter town), opting instead to use the Reading connection for freight trains. Instrumental in this realignment was the placement of a wye track at CAPITOL interlocking in Harrisburg. Conrail also abandoned the trackage on the western portion of the CV bridge in Harrisburg, leaving a wye for Amtrak to turn power. The Winchester Secondary was sold to a short line. The Lurgan Branch name, originally used by Conrail for the ex-Reading trackage that passed through Shippensburg to a connection with the Western Maryland, was retained. Norfolk Southern Railway operates the trackage since the 1999 breakup of Conrail.

The planned CorridorOne commuter rail service between Harrisburg and Carlisle intended to use the old Cumberland Valley Railroad Bridge

== See also ==
- CorridorOne
- Cumberland Valley Railroad Bridge
- Harrisburg Transportation Center
- Lurgan Branch
