= J.W. Jung Seed Company =

American seed catalog company

The J.W. Jung Seed Company is a family-owned and operated garden seed company founded in 1907 in Randolph, Wisconsin by John William "J.W." Jung. The company publishes several seed catalogs including Jung Seed, Totally Tomatoes, Vermont Bean Seed Company, Edmunds Roses, Roots & Rhizomes, R. H. Shumway, McClure & Zimmerman and HPS Seed. The company also runs several retail garden centers in Wisconsin.

Jung Seed Genetics was spun off in the 1990s. Jung Seed Genetics and Jung Seed Company are not the same company and not affiliated.
