= Frederick Watts =

American agricultural reformer, lawyer and businessman

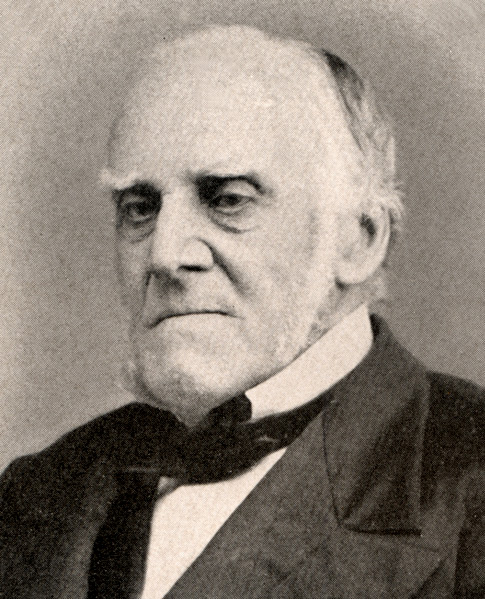

3rd United States Commissioner of Agriculture
- In office August 1, 1871 – March 4, 1877
- President: Ulysses S. Grant
- Preceded by: Horace Capron
- Succeeded by: William Gates LeDuc

Personal details
- Born: May 9, 1801 Carlisle, Pennsylvania, U.S.
- Died: August 17, 1889 (aged 88) Carlisle, Pennsylvania, U.S.
- Political party: Whig (before 1856); Republican (1856–1889)
- Education: Dickinson College

Frederick Watts (May 9, 1801 – August 17, 1889), was an agricultural reformer, lawyer and businessman. He is termed the “Father of the Pennsylvania State University”. He headed the U.S. Department of Agriculture as commissioner of agriculture from 1871 to 1877 under President Ulysses S. Grant.

He served as President of the Board of Trustees of Pennsylvania State University (originally known as the Farmer’s High School, then Pennsylvania Agricultural College) from its founding in 1855 through 1874 and helped to organize many elements of the Land Grant University movement in America. He was President of the Cumberland Valley Railroad from 1840 to 1873. This early railroad ran from Chambersburg to Harrisburg in 1837 and introduced the first "sleeping cars" in America; the bunks were made of three rows of upholstered boards that folded up during the day and then hung from connecting leather straps at night. The first such car, the "Chambersburg," began service in 1839 and the "Carlisle" followed soon afterwards.

== Early life ==
Watts was born in Carlisle, Pennsylvania. He was the son of lawyer David Watts, and the grandson of a Brigadier General in the American Revolution, also named Frederick Watts. Frederick entered Dickinson College in Carlisle in 1815, but did not graduate because of the school temporarily closed.

In 1827 Watts married Eliza Cranston, who bore three daughters before her death in 1832. In 1835 he married Henrietta Ege in 1835, who bore five sons and one daughter. He was a Whig and a member of St. John's Episcopal Church in Carlisle.

== Career ==
He practiced law and held positions in local courts starting in the 1820s. In 1849 he was appointed as president judge of Pennsylvania’s Ninth Judicial District Court.

He had a law office and residence at 20 East High Street, later part of the Fraternal Order of Eagles in Carlisle. He also lived with his family at "Creekside" on the Conodoguinet. It was an important example of brick Gothic Revival residential architecture, now on the Cumberland Valley Register of Historic Places, and also one of Carlisle's listed "Civil War Buildings". The covered wooden Watts Bridge spanned the Creek near there, until it was destroyed by storm and vandals in the 1980s; it was then replaced by a concrete structure.

He organized the Carlisle Gas and Water Company in 1854, and served as a member of the Dickinson College Board of Trustees (1828-1833, 1841-1844).

In 1838, he and a partner bought the Pine Grove Iron Works on South Mountain near Chambersburg, Pennsylvania.

In 1840, at Creekside, and with the help of Cyrus McCormick, he demonstrated the operation of McCormick’s reaper for the first time in Pennsylvania. On the day appointed for the test, between 500 and 1,000 people showed up at Watts' farm to observe the "new-fangled" machine. When the farmhand sent to collect the cut grain was having difficulty managing his task, a stranger stepped out of the crowd to demonstrate the proper technique; it was Cyrus McCormick himself. His reaper proved to be one of the most important labor-saving agricultural devices of the nineteenth century.

In 1851 Watts was elected the first President of the Pennsylvania Agricultural Society.

He lobbied for the passage of the Morrill Act, which became law in 1862 and founded land-grant universities.

In 1871, "At the request of President Ulysses S. Grant [. . . ] he joined his cabinet as United States Agricultural Commissioner and began an official investigation of the condition of the nation's forests. This inquiry led to the creation of the forestry division of the United States Department of Agriculture, which was established a few years later."

Political offices
| Preceded by Horace Capron | United States Commissioner of Agriculture; 1871–1877 | Succeeded by William Gates LeDuc |
