= Robert Fish (footballer) =

English footballer

Personal information
- Full name: Robert Fish
- Date of birth: 26 May 1871
- Place of birth: Darwen, England
- Date of death: 1944 (aged 72–73)
- Position: Wing half

Senior career*
Years	Team	Apps	(Gls)
1891–1899	Darwen	69	(2)
1899	Chorley		
Total		69	(2)
- * Club domestic league appearances and goals

Robert Fish (26 May 1871 – 1944) was an English footballer who played in the Football League for Darwen.
