= Seed company =

Business that produces and sells seeds for flowers, fruit, or vegetables

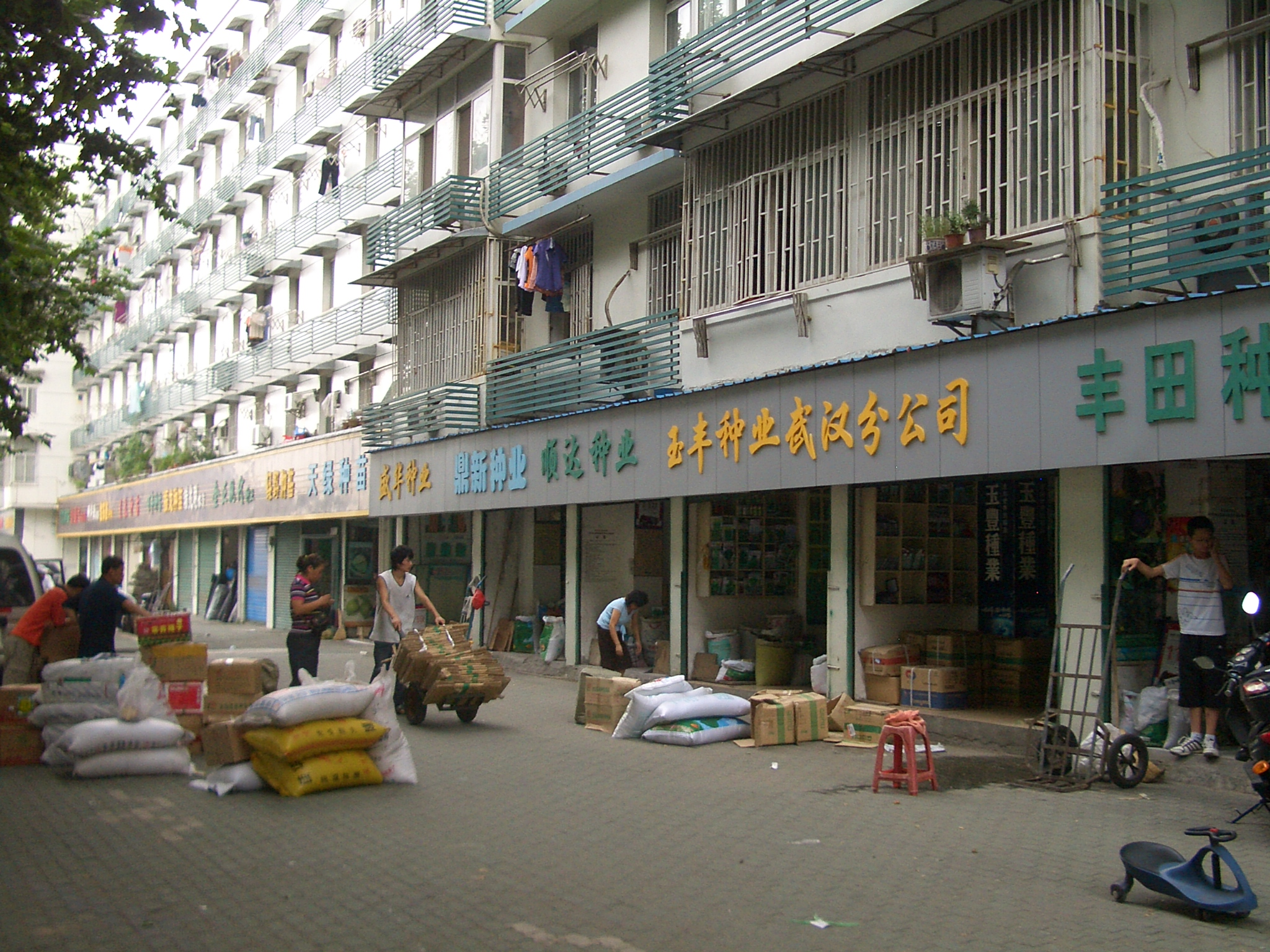
A street full of seed shops in Wuhan, China, a few blocks from Wuchang Railway Station

Seed companies produce and sell seeds for flowers, fruits and vegetables to commercial growers and amateur gardeners. The production of seed is a multibillion-dollar global business, which uses growing facilities and growing locations worldwide. While most of the seed is produced by large specialist growers, large amounts are also produced by small growers who produce only one to a few crop types. The larger companies supply seed both to commercial resellers and wholesalers. The resellers and wholesalers sell to vegetable and fruit growers, and to companies who package seed into packets and sell them on to the amateur gardener.

Most seed companies or resellers that sell to retail produce a catalog, for seed to be sown the following spring, that is generally published during early winter. These catalogs are eagerly awaited by the amateur gardener, as during winter months there is little that can be done in the garden so this time can be spent planning the following year’s gardening. The largest collection of nursery and seed trade catalogs in the U.S. is held at the National Agricultural Library where the earliest catalogs date from the late 18th century, with most published from the 1890s to the present.

Seed companies produce a huge range of seeds from highly developed F1 hybrids to open pollinated wild species. They have extensive research facilities to produce plants with genetic materials that result in improved uniformity and appeal. These qualities might include disease resistance, higher yields, dwarf habit and vibrant or new colors. These improvements are often closely guarded to protect them from being utilized by other producers, thus plant cultivars are often sold under the company's own name and protected by international laws from being grown for seed production by others. Along with the growth in the allotment movement, and the increasing popularity of gardening, there have emerged many small independent seed companies. Many of these are active in seed conservation and encouraging diversity. They often offer organic and open pollinated varieties of seeds as opposed to hybrids. Many of these varieties are heirloom varieties. The use of old varieties maintains diversity in the horticultural gene pool. It may be more appropriate for amateur gardeners to use older (heirloom) varieties as the modern seed types are often the same as those grown by commercial producers, and so characteristics which are useful to them (e.g. vegetables ripening at the same time) may be unsuited to home growing.

== History ==
Shakers were among the earliest commercial producers of garden seeds; the first seeds sold in paper packets were produced by the Watervliet Shakers in Colonie, New York.

Until 1924, US farmers received seed from the federal government's extensive free seed program that distributed millions of packages of seed annually. At its high point in 1897, over 2 million packages of seed were distributed to farmers. Even at the time the program was eliminated in 1924, it was the third largest line item in the United States Department of Agriculture's budget.

In 1930, seed companies were not primarily concerned with varietal production, but were still trying to successfully commodify seeds. There was no need to protect seed breeding at that time because there were few markets for seeds. Seed companies' first priority was simply to establish a market, and they continued to view congressional seed distribution as a principal constraint.

=== Consolidation of the commercial seed industry ===
From 1994 to 2010, seed prices increased drastically due to a consolidation of the commercial seed industry into six major companies. During this time, companies introduced six genetically engineered crops for just two traits: herbicide tolerance and insect resistance. In 1996, Monsanto introduced its first RoundUp Ready seeds engineered to tolerate the company's proprietary herbicide.

By 2019, four seed companies, Bayer, Corteva, ChemChina and BASF had consolidated to dominate the commercial seed market, controlling 60% of the global proprietary seed sales. Economists have claimed that the industry has lost its competitive edge and anticipate less choice and higher prices for farmers. There is further concern that due to the companies' interest in intellectual property, there will in future be less innovation and more restrictions on seed availability, which could make the seeds inaccessible to public researchers, farmers, and independent breeders, thereby threatening the world's food security. Activists have called for stronger antitrust measures in the face of these mergers and acquisitions, and recommended a United Nations treaty on competition to make changes internationally. Pope Francis refers to these issues in his 2015 encyclical letter Laudato si', on "care for our common home":

In various countries, we see an expansion of oligopolies for the production of cereals and other products needed for their cultivation. This dependency would be aggravated were the production of infertile seeds to be considered; the effect would be to force farmers to purchase them from larger producers.

Francis calls for a dialogue on seed production issues involving seed producers and all parties affected.

== Seed packets and seed information ==
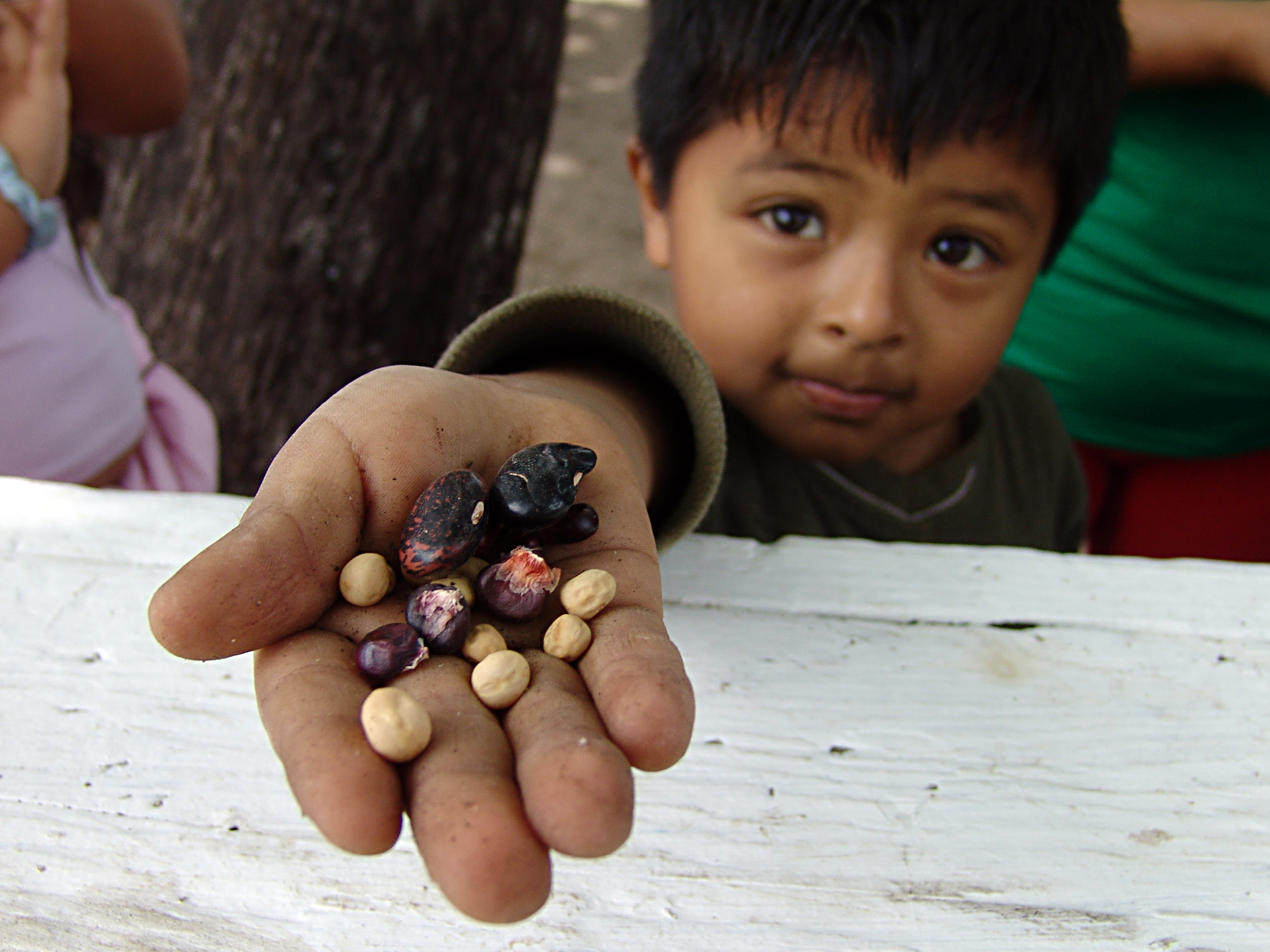
A farmer's son holding out seeds

Generally, seed packet labels include information covering:

- Common plant name and the botanical name (in parentheses).
- Spacing and depth: How deep to place the seeds in the soil, space between plants (from one row to the other one and from one plant to the other one in the same row).
- Height: Approximate height the plant will reach when mature.
- Soil: Type of soil the plant prefers.
- Water, such as "keep the soil lightly damp", "bottom water the plant", "drench the soil with water", "daily misting of water" and "almost dry out before re-watering".
- Sun: Full direct sunlight, partial sun, diffused sunlight, or grows well in the shade.
- Indoors or outdoors: If the plant is best suited for growing indoors, outdoors or both.
- Whether it is a perennial or annual.
- Planting, germination and harvest period: This information can be indicated by months or quarters of the year.
- Special requirements, if necessary.

This information may be represented graphically.

== See also ==
- American Seed Trade Association
- Arboretum
- Biodiversity
- ESA European Seed Association
- List of seed packet companies
- Monoculture
- Seed bank
