= Pennsylvania Route 114 =

State highway in Pennsylvania, US

Pennsylvania Route 114

Route information
- Maintained by PennDOT
- Length: 19.372 mi (31.176 km)
- Existed: 1928–present

Major junctions
- West end: PA 944 in Wertzville
- I-81 in Wertzville; US 11 in Hogestown; PA 641 in Mechanicsburg; US 15 in Upper Allen Township; PA 382 in Fairview Township; PA 262 in Fairview Township; I-83 near New Cumberland
- East end: SR 1003 (Old York Road) near New Market

Location
- Country: United States
- State: Pennsylvania
- Counties: Cumberland, York

Highway system
- Pennsylvania State Route System; Interstate; US; State; Scenic; Legislative
← PA 113	→ PA 115

Pennsylvania Route 114 (PA 114) is a 19-mile-long (31 km) state highway located in Cumberland and York counties in Pennsylvania. The western terminus is at PA 944 in Wertzville. The eastern terminus is at State Route 1003 (SR 1003, Old York Road) adjacent to the Capital City Airport near New Market. PA 114 heads south from PA 944 through the western suburbs of Harrisburg and has an interchange with Interstate 81 (I-81) before it comes to an intersection with U.S. Route 11 (US 11) in Hogestown. The route continues south to Mechanicsburg, where it forms a concurrency with PA 641. From here, PA 114 heads south to an interchange with US 15 and turns east in Bowmansdale, continuing to Lisburn. The route leaves Cumberland County for York County and reaches a junction with PA 382, where it turns north through rural areas and intersects PA 262. PA 114 curves northeast and comes to an interchange with I-83 before it continues to its terminus.

PA 114 was designated in 1928 between US 11 in Hogestown and Lisburn. The portion of the current route east of present-day PA 382 was designated as part of PA 24, which reached its northern terminus at US 111 (Old York Road) in New Market. In the 1940s, PA 114 was extended east from Lisburn to PA 24. The north end of PA 24 was cut back from Old York Road to an interchange with I-83/US 111 in the 1950s. In the 1960s, PA 114 was extended north from its eastern terminus to Old York Road along the former alignment of PA 24. The route was extended north from US 11 in Hogestown to PA 944 in Wertzville in the 1970s, with the portion between I-81 and US 11 widened to a divided highway.

== Route description ==
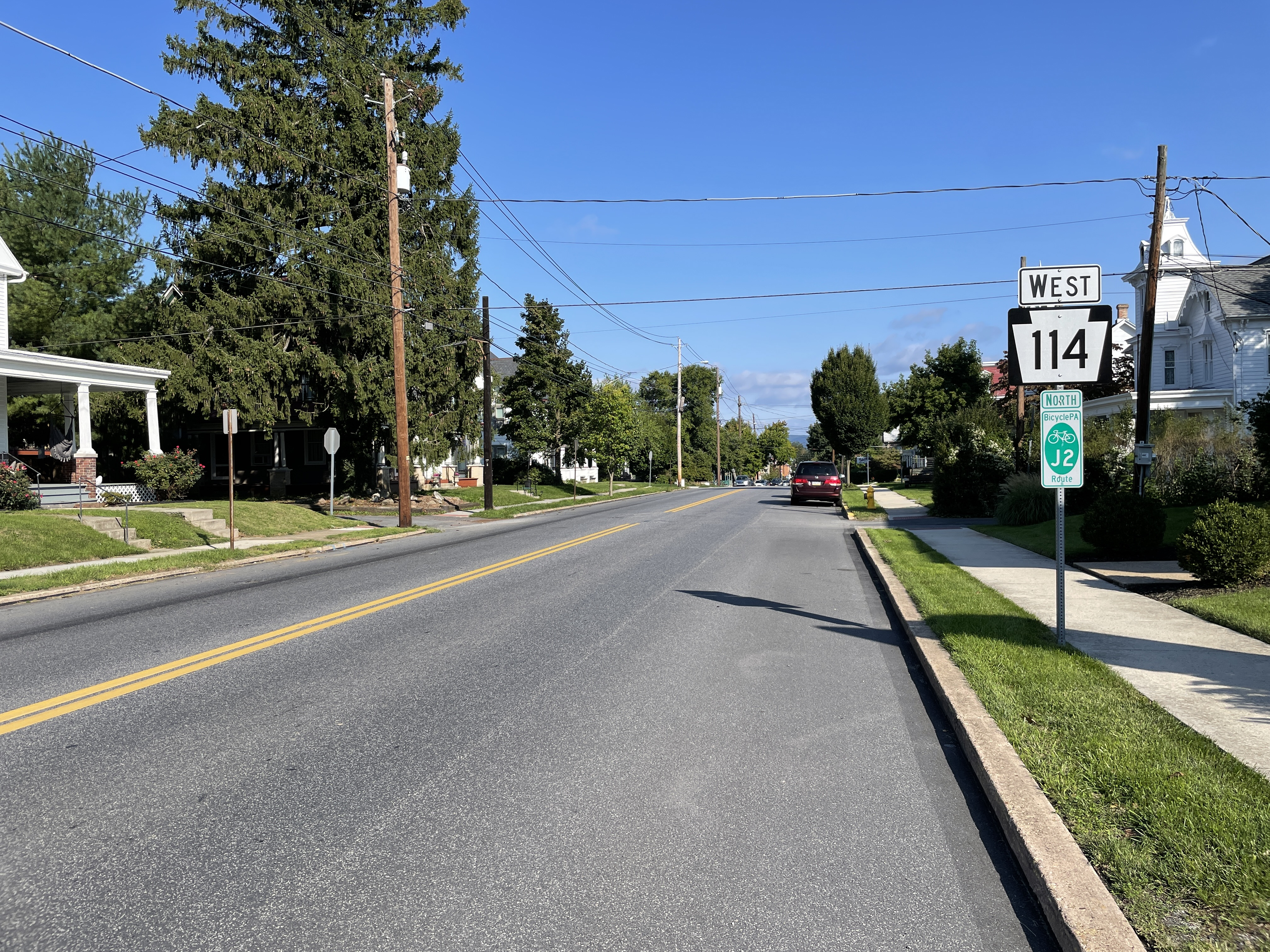
PA 114 westbound in Mechanicsburg

PA 114 begins at an intersection with PA 944 in Silver Spring Township, Cumberland County, heading south on two-lane undivided Conodoguinet Parkway. The road heads through areas of farms and woods, passing west of a park and ride lot and reaching a diamond interchange with I-81, where it becomes a four-lane divided highway. From this point, the route heads southeast and crosses the Conodoguinet Creek, continuing south into business areas and intersecting US 11 in Hogestown. Past this intersection, PA 114 becomes two-lane undivided Hogestown Road and runs through agricultural areas with some housing developments, curving southeast. The road heads through residential areas as it turns south and comes into the borough of Mechanicsburg, with the road name becoming North York Street. Here, the route passes industrial areas to the west and homes to the east. PA 114 enters residential and business areas as it crosses Norfolk Southern's Shippensburg Secondary railroad line at-grade and intersects PA 641, turning east to form a concurrency with that route on West Main Street. The road runs through the commercial downtown, with PA 114 splitting from PA 641 by turning south onto South Market Street.

The route continues past several homes, crossing into Upper Allen Township. The road briefly becomes the border between Upper Allen Township to the west and Mechanicsburg to the east before fully entering Upper Allen Township again and running through areas of farmland and housing developments, crossing over I-76 (Pennsylvania Turnpike). PA 114 continues south through residential subdivisions with some commercial establishments, reaching a diamond interchange with the US 15 freeway. The route continues southeast past more suburban development, turning east onto East Lisburn Road in Bowmansdale. PA 114 heads north-northeast into agricultural areas, turning southeast to pass under Norfolk Southern's Lurgan Branch railroad line before resuming north-northeast. The road continues east through a mix of farmland and woodland with some homes, crossing into Lower Allen Township and running through the residential community of Lisburn on Main Street.

PA 114 crosses the Yellow Breeches Creek into Fairview Township in York County and becomes Cedars Road, heading through rural areas with a few residences. The route intersects PA 382 and turns to the north onto Lewisberry Road, curving northeast into forested areas with some homes. PA 114 comes to an intersection with PA 262 in Bunches and turns northwest to continue along Lewisberry Road. The road passes through more wooded areas before turning north and running through a mix of fields and residential development. The route curves northeast near Fair Acres and heads through more rural residential areas as it comes to a partial cloverleaf interchange with I-83. Past this, the route runs through woods and crosses under I-76 (Pennsylvania Turnpike). PA 114 runs through more residential areas prior to ending at SR 1003 (Old York Road) west of the Capital City Airport near New Market.

== History ==
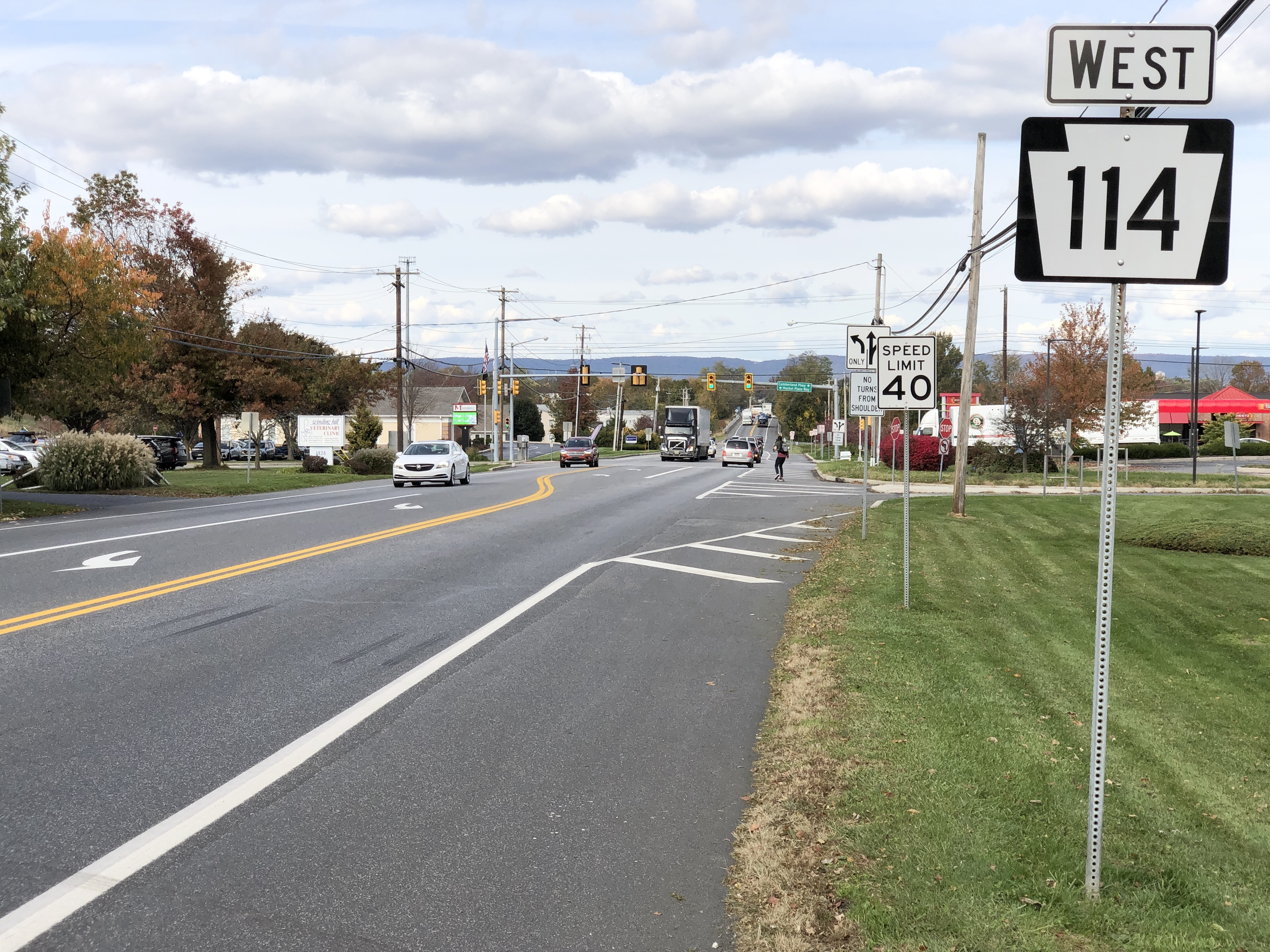
PA 114 westbound in Upper Allen Township

When Pennsylvania legislated routes in 1911, the portion of present-day PA 114 east of current PA 382 was designated as part of Legislative Route 250, which ran between York and the Harrisburg area. By this time, the current route east of Mechanicsburg was an unpaved road, with a small paved section to the west of the Yellow Breeches Creek. PA 114 was designated in 1928 to run from US 11 in Hogestown south and east to Lisburn, where an unnumbered, unpaved road continued east to PA 24 (now PA 382). The present-day route east of there was designated as the northernmost part of PA 24, which reached its northern terminus at US 111 (Old York Road) in New Market. At this time, the entire length of PA 114 along with this section of PA 24 was paved. By 1930, the road between Wertzville and Hogestown was an unnumbered, unpaved road. In the 1930s, the unnumbered roads between Wertzville and Hogestown and Lisburn and PA 24 were paved. PA 114 was extended east from Lisburn to PA 24 in the 1940s. In the 1950s, the northern terminus of PA 24 was cut back to an interchange with I-83/US 111 southwest of New Market, resulting in the road between I-83/US 111 and Old York Road becoming unnumbered. The eastern portion of PA 114 was extended north from PA 382 to Old York Road in New Market in the 1960s, replacing that portion of PA 24. In the 1970s, the route was extended north from US 11 in Hogestown to PA 944 in Wertzville, with an interchange at I-81; the portion of the road between I-81 and US 11 was widened into a divided highway.

== Major intersections ==
County	Location	mi	km	Destinations	Notes
Cumberland	Silver Spring Township	0.000	0.000	PA 944 (Wertzville Road) – Carlisle Springs, Wertzville	Western terminus
Cumberland	Silver Spring Township	1.026	1.651	I-81 – Harrisburg, Carlisle	Exit 57 (I-81)
Cumberland	Silver Spring Township	2.883	4.640	US 11 (Carlisle Pike) – Camp Hill, Carlisle	
Cumberland	Mechanicsburg	5.795	9.326	PA 641 west (Main Street)	West end of PA 641 concurrency
Cumberland	Mechanicsburg	6.093	9.806	PA 641 east (Main Street)	East end of PA 641 concurrency
Cumberland	Upper Allen Township	8.890	14.307	US 15 – Harrisburg, Gettysburg	Interchange
York	Fairview Township	14.914	24.002	PA 382 south (Lewisberry Road) – Lewisberry	Northern terminus of PA 382
York	Fairview Township	15.835	25.484	PA 262 east (Fishing Creek Road)	Western terminus of PA 262
York	Fairview Township	18.310	29.467	I-83 to I-76 / Penna Turnpike – Harrisburg, York	Exit 39A (I-83)
York	Fairview Township	19.372	31.176	SR 1003 (Old York Road) to I-83 north	Eastern terminus
1.000 mi = 1.609 km; 1.000 km = 0.621 mi: Concurrency terminus
