= Bowmansdale, Pennsylvania =

Unincorporated community in Pennsylvania, US

- Unincorporated village
- Location within the state of Pennsylvania Bowmansdale (the United States)
- Coordinates: 40°09′58″N 76°58′41″W
- Country: United States
- State: Pennsylvania
- County: Cumberland
- Township: Upper Allen
- Elevation: 408 ft (124 m)
- Time zone: UTC-5 (Eastern (EST))
  - Summer (DST): UTC-4 (EDT)
- GNIS feature ID: 1170073

Bowmansdale is an unincorporated community located in Upper Allen Township in Cumberland County, Pennsylvania, United States, south of Mechanicsburg. It is named after Jacob Bowman, a former Cumberland County sheriff.

Bowmansdale has been recognized as a historic district by the Cumberland County Planning Department. The other historic districts in eastern Cumberland County include the Market Street District in Camp Hill, the Lisburn Historic District, the McCormick Road Historic District, the Mechanicsburg Commercial Historic District, the New Cumberland Historic District, the Shepherdstown Historic District, and West Fairview Village.

Before permanent settlements were built in Cumberland County, numerous Native American transportation paths crossed the county, including those of the Shawnee and Delaware tribes. Bowmansdale was a recognized stop on the Conoy Trail that ran between the places that are now known as Lisburn and Carlisle.

Bowmansdale is home to the historic Lindenwood Farm. The founding date for the estate is unknown, but a document from the Cumberland County Courthouse recorded its sale by William Crawford to Robert Bryson in 1751. By the late 1780s, the property was home to tanning and limekiln businesses. Several buildings from the 1860s remain on the property, along with barns that are older.

By 1884, Bowmansdale was a stop on the Harrisburg and Potomac Railroad that connected Harrisburg to Shippensburg. The rail line was later purchased by the Reading Railroad.

The Bowmansdale Stoner covered bridge, built in 1867, was relocated to the campus of nearby Messiah College in Grantham in 1972.

== Notable people ==
- Russ Wrightstone: professional baseball player
