= WVMM =

Radio station at Messiah College in Grantham, Pennsylvania

Coordinates: 40.160°N 76.983°W

- Grantham, Pennsylvania; United States
- Broadcast area: Grantham, Pennsylvania/Harrisburg, Pennsylvania
- Frequency: 90.7 MHz
- Branding: The Pulse

Programming
- Format: College radio

Ownership
- Owner: Messiah University

History
- First air date: October 6, 1989

Technical information
- Licensing authority: FCC
- Facility ID: 41312
- ERP: 100 watts
- HAAT: 50 meters (160 ft)

Links
- Public license information: Public file; LMS
- Website: pulse.messiah.edu/pulseradio

WVMM is Messiah University's student-operated radio station, located at 90.7 FM. The station is known by its listeners as "The Pulse". Messiah College had a radio station from 1970 to 1983. On October 6, 1989, WVMM was resumed, this time as an over-the-air FM radio station. Prior to that, it was heard only on campus. WVMM now operates at 100 watts, and can be heard throughout the Harrisburg area.

== Programming ==
WVMM maintains an eclectic mix of programming, ranging from the primary format of indie/college rock to bluegrass, Latin, hardcore, hip hop, jazz, world, and electronica. The station also airs the BBC World Service weekdays from 7 a.m. to 11 a.m., as well as sports/entertainment programming from the BBC at certain weekend times, and other current events/issues programming during the week.
