= Siddonsburg, Pennsylvania =

Unincorporated community in Pennsylvania, U.S.

Coordinates: 40°08′45″N 76°57′58″W

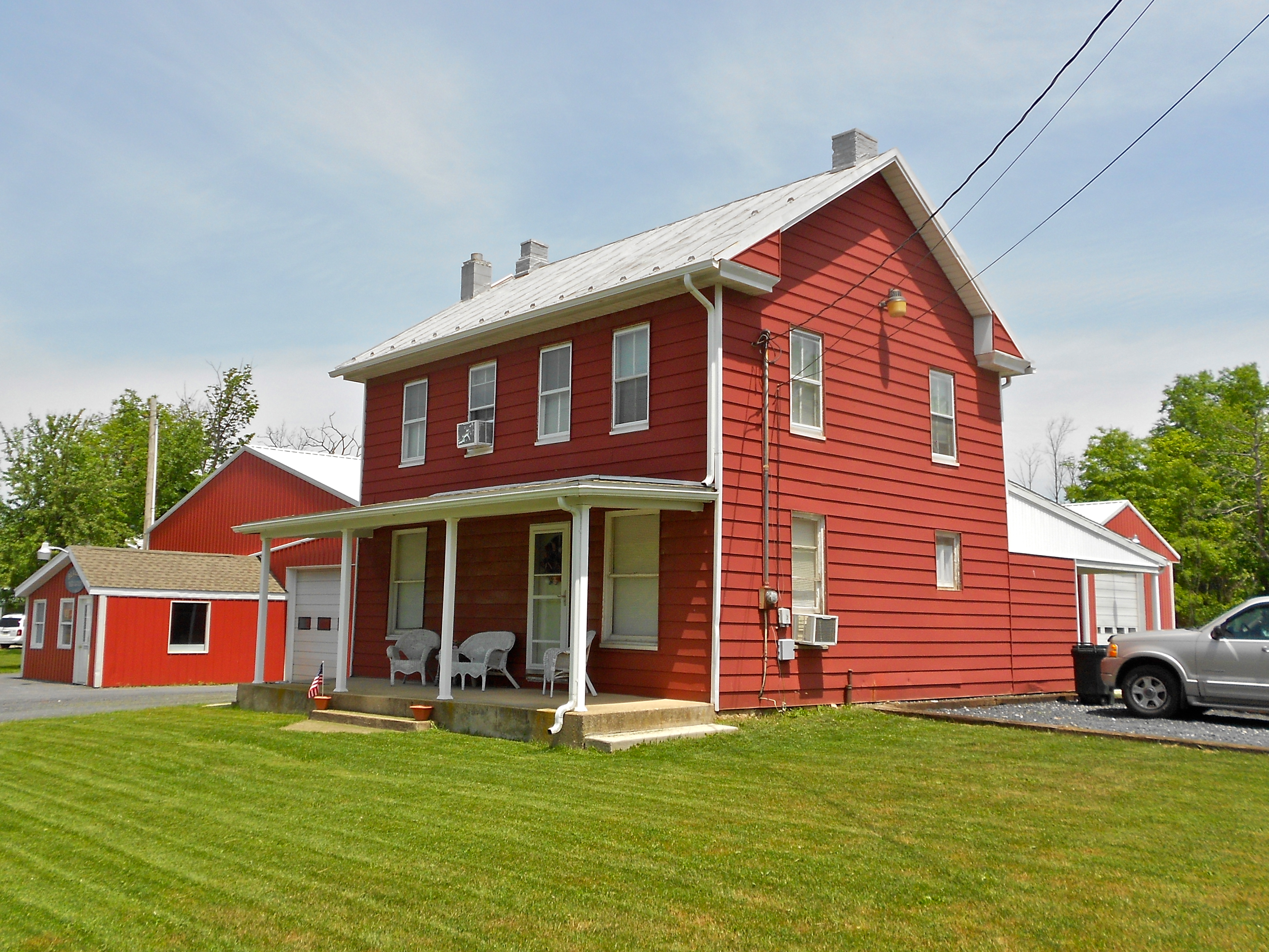
House in Siddonsburg

Siddonsburg is an unincorporated community in Monaghan Township, York County, Pennsylvania, United States. The community is located approximately two miles south of Messiah College. Siddonsburg was originally named Siddonstown. Siddonstown was established by Benjamin Siddons.
