= Wertzville, Pennsylvania =

Unincorporated community in Pennsylvania, U.S.

Coordinates: 40°17′01″N 77°02′38″W

Wertzville is an unincorporated community in Silver Spring Township, Cumberland County, Pennsylvania, United States, along the southern foothill of Blue Mountain. The Simmons Creek flows south through the village to the Conodoguinet Creek, which flows generally east to the Susquehanna River. It is located on the northwestern terminus of Route 114 with Route 944 and is served by the Cumberland Valley School District. The community is served by the Mechanicsburg post office, with the ZIP code of 17050.
