= Gilbert Bridge =

- U.S. National Register of Historic Places
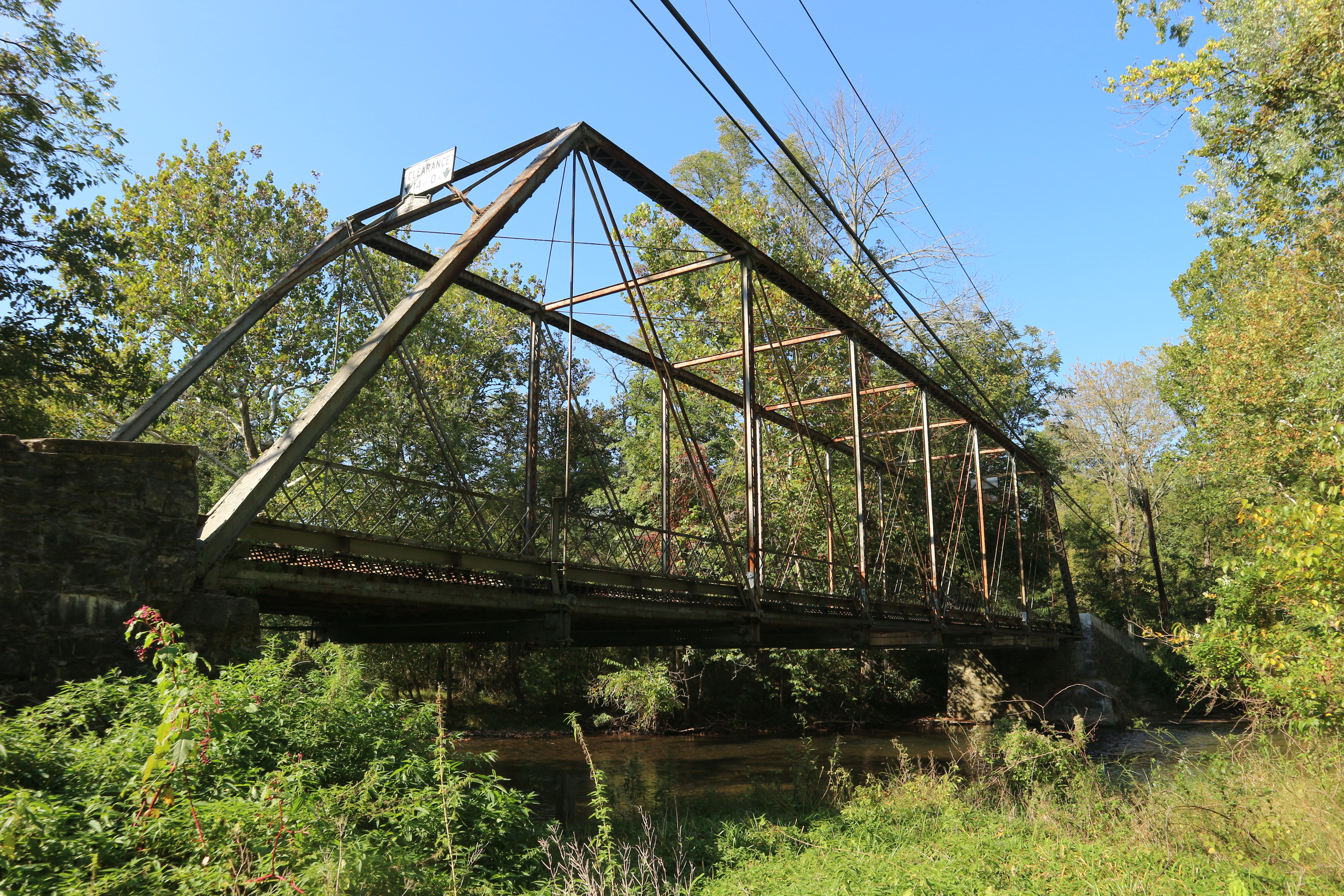

- Location within Pennsylvania Location within the United States
- Location: Bishop Road / Gilbert Road over Yellow Breeches Creek, northwest of Siddonsburg, Monaghan Township, Pennsylvania and Upper Allen Township, Pennsylvania
- Coordinates: 40°9′13″N 76°58′57″W
- Area: less than one acre
- Built: 1899
- Built by: Wrought Iron Bridge Co.
- Architectural style: Pratt through truss
- NRHP reference No.: 89000355
- Added to NRHP: May 5, 1989

The Gilbert Bridge, also known as the Hall Estate Bridge, was an historic Pratt truss bridge in Monaghan Township, York County, Pennsylvania and Upper Allen Township, Cumberland County, Pennsylvania, United States.

It was added to the National Register of Historic Places in 1988.

== History and architectural features ==
Erected in 1899, this historic steel bridge was built by the Wrought Iron Bridge Company and measures 102 feet (31 m) long and 18 feet (5.5 m) wide overall. It crosses the Yellow Breeches Creek.

== Gallery ==
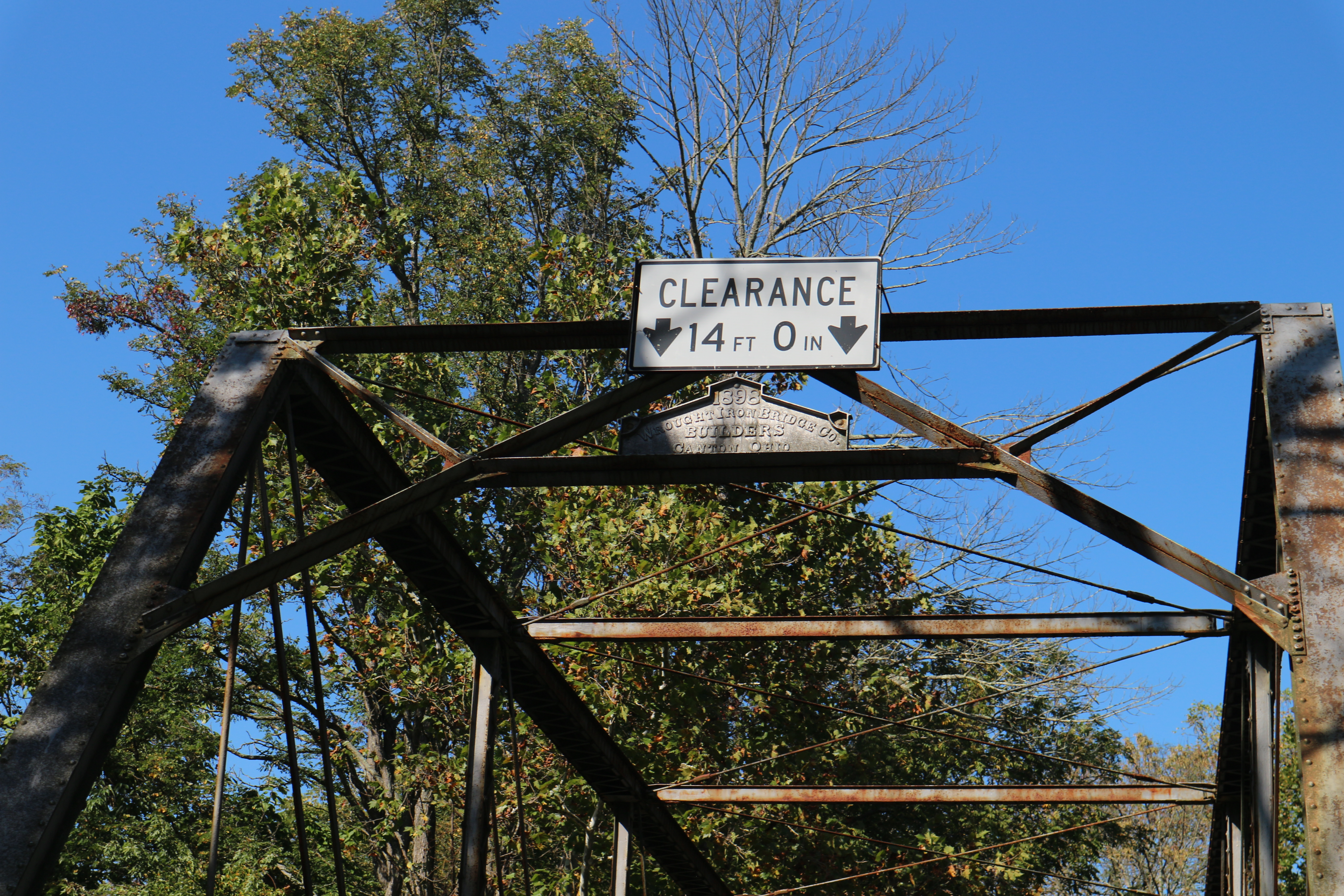
Bridge plaque

== See also ==
- Green Lane Bridge (Yellow Breeches Creek)
- National Register of Historic Places listings in Cumberland County, Pennsylvania
- National Register of Historic Places listings in York County, Pennsylvania
