= Grantham, Pennsylvania =

Unincorporated community in Pennsylvania, US

- Unincorporated community
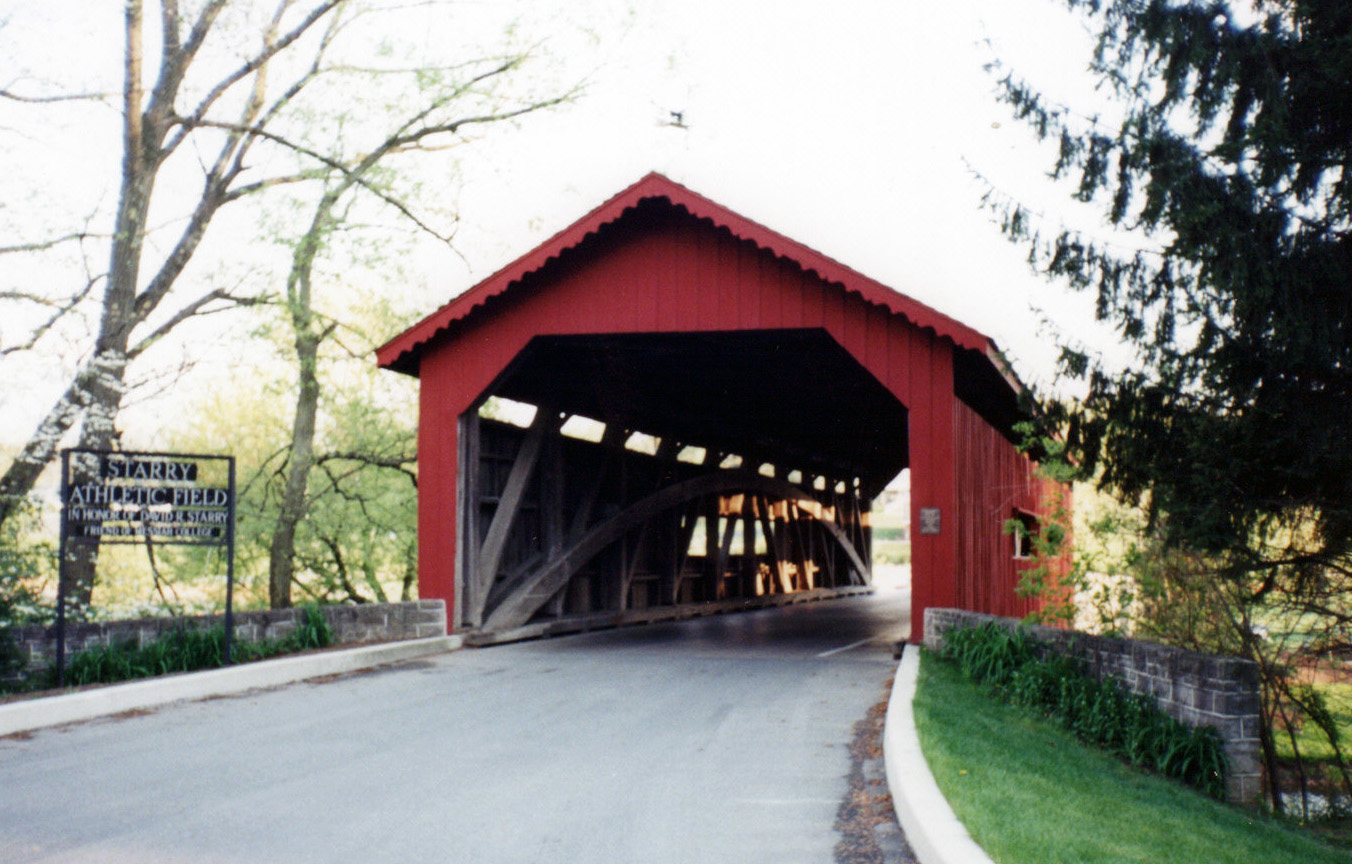
- The covered bridge on the Messiah University campus in Grantham

- Location within the U.S. state of Pennsylvania Grantham (the United States)
- Coordinates: 40°09′23″N 76°59′47″W
- Country: United States
- State: Pennsylvania
- County: Cumberland
- Township: Upper Allen
- Time zone: UTC-5 (Eastern (EST))
  - Summer (DST): UTC-4 (EDT)

Grantham is an unincorporated community in Upper Allen Township, Cumberland County, in the U.S. state of Pennsylvania, best known today for the Christian liberal arts college, Messiah University, whose students make up most of its population.

== History ==
There is no industry, no mass-commercialization, and very little night life outside of the college. The population of Grantham is 85-90% between the ages of 18 and 25 years old - if you only count the student population. The actual residents number between 600-650, a large number of which are Messiah alumni, employees or parents of the same. Founded in the early twentieth century, Grantham was built around the rapidly growing industry built along the nearby railway line, which supplied the labor and logistical support to the macaroni factory run by Messiah University's (formerly Messiah College) first president S.R. Smith. After the noddle factory went out of business, the facility was used for aircraft parts and a greeting card business. It was destroyed by fire prior to 1957 and stood derelict for many years; eventually it was demolished to provide a new maintenance facility for the growing college.

Most of the oldest homes in "downtown" Grantham were built around 1915-17 to house workers for the factory. Currently some of these older homes are used as rentals for college students and others, while others remain private homes. The original Grantham National Bank building (which printed its own currency before the advent of the Fed) still stands on Mill Road; its kitchen retains the original vault.

The other early business was the mill, a large stone building built in 1775, located on a chase that feeds from Yellow Breeches Creek. It was the closest place for farmers to bring their grain for milling. The mill is currently a private residence; the home of the original miller (the Griswold Residence) is being renovated as a private residence after being used by Messiah College students from about 2003 to 2007. As of 2007, the rest of the Griswold farm (7 acres) was being developed into a small subdivision of single family homes.

As the college grew, the "uptown" section of Grantham was developed in the 1950s and '60s with small post-war starter homes, which were just fine for the college's faculty and staff who were moving into them. At the far edges of the community are some newer townhomes, and since the closing in 2004 of Grantham Road at U.S. Route 15 (a long-time dangerous intersection) the town enjoys relative peace and quiet. Summer weekend evenings are often punctuated by the roar of nearby Williams Grove Speedway, but traffic through town is now minimal, which allows for safe biking and walking along Grantham's roads.

An active Grantham Community Association meets regularly to address issues related to township zoning, town-gown relations and public safety. An annual yard sale weekend is posted to bring maximum traffic to the town.

The Gilbert Bridge was added to the National Register of Historic Places in 1989.

== See also ==
- Messiah College, Pennsylvania, a census-designated place covering the Messiah College campus but not Grantham proper
