= Etters Bridge =

- U.S. National Register of Historic Places
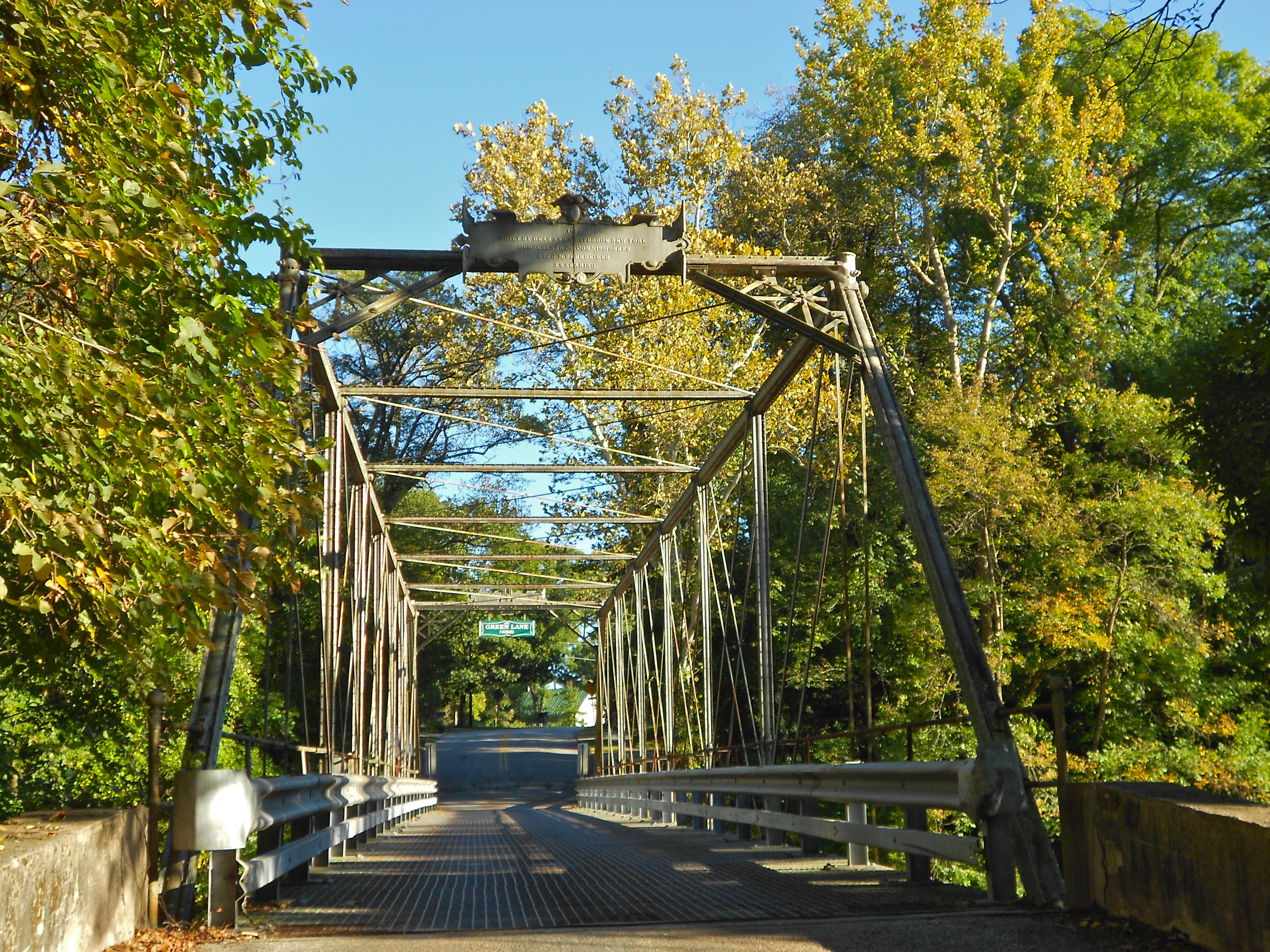

- Location within Pennsylvania Location within the United States
- Location: Green Lane Dr. and Yellow Breeches Creek, Fairview Township and Lower Allen Township, Pennsylvania
- Coordinates: 40°13′26″N 76°53′51″W
- Area: less than one acre
- Built: 1889
- Built by: Dean & Westbrook; Phoenix Bridge Co. (steel fabricator)
- Architect: Dean & Westbrook
- Architectural style: Pratt truss bridge
- NRHP reference No.: 86000308
- Added to NRHP: February 27, 1986

Etters Bridge, also known as Green Lane Bridge, is a historic Pratt truss bridge in Lower Allen Township, Cumberland County and Fairview Township, York County, Pennsylvania. It was built in 1889, and measures 131-foot-long (40 m) and 18-foot-wide (5.5 m) overall. The wrought iron bridge was designed and constructed by Dean & Westbrook. The Phoenix Bridge Company fabricated the superstructure. The bridge crosses Yellow Breeches Creek.

It was added to the National Register of Historic Places in 1986.

== See also ==
- Gilbert Bridge
- National Register of Historic Places listings in Cumberland County, Pennsylvania
- National Register of Historic Places listings in York County, Pennsylvania
