= New Market, Pennsylvania =

Unincorporated place in Pennsylvania, US

- Census-designated place
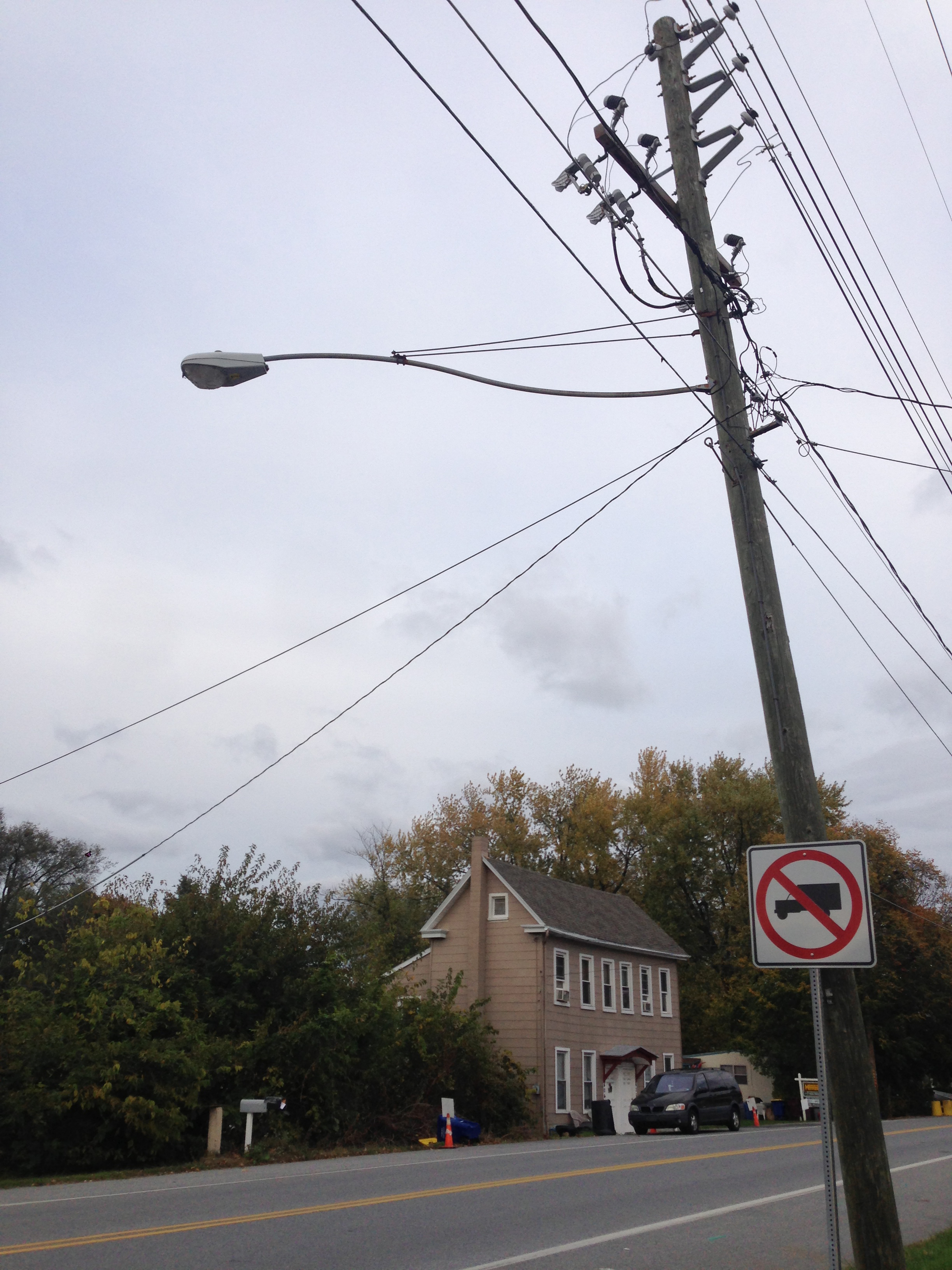
- Ross Avenue

- Location in York County and the state of Pennsylvania.
- Coordinates: 40°13′23″N 76°51′22″W
- Country: United States
- State: Pennsylvania
- County: York
- Township: Fairview

Area
  - Total: 0.19 sq mi (0.49 km^{2})
  - Land: 0.19 sq mi (0.49 km^{2})
  - Water: 0 sq mi (0.00 km^{2})
- Elevation: 315 ft (96 m)

Population (2020)
  - Total: 705
  - Density: 3,751.4/sq mi (1,448.43/km^{2})
- Time zone: UTC-5 (Eastern (EST))
  - Summer (DST): UTC-4 (EDT)
- FIPS code: 42-53872
- GNIS feature ID: 2633884

New Market is a census-designated place located in Fairview Township, York County in the state of Pennsylvania, United States. The community is located near the Susquehanna River in far northern York County, near the borough of New Cumberland, which is located in Cumberland County. As of the 2020 census, the population was 705 residents.

== History ==
In 1744 David Priest accepted a warrant of a 400-acre land tract, which was sold in 1756 to the Willis family. In 1807, Henry Mosser and William Culbertson laid out the village into 120 lots. A ferry, originally owned and operated by John Harris Jr., was operated in New Market continuously through multiple owners and eventually the Commonwealth of Pennsylvania from 1740 until about 1820.

== Notable person ==
- John Kirk, American Indian Wars soldier on List of Medal of Honor recipients for the Indian Wars

== Demographics ==
As of the 2020 census data, the total population was 705 individuals. Among them, 543 individuals are 18 years and older, constituting approximately 77.0% of the total population. The demographic breakdown by race and ethnicity shows Hispanic or Latino individuals comprise 15.9% of the population, while White individuals, not of Hispanic or Latino descent, represent the majority at 70.6%. Additionally, Black or African American individuals, excluding those of Hispanic or Latino origin, account for 5.1% of the populace. American Indian or Alaska Native individuals, not of Hispanic or Latino heritage, constitute 0.6% of the population, while Asian individuals, also not of Hispanic or Latino descent, make up 1.0%. There are no individuals identified as Native Hawaiian and Other Pacific Islander alone or under the category of Some Other Race, not Hispanic or Latino. Individuals identifying with Two or More Races, not of Hispanic or Latino descent, contribute 6.8% to the overall demographic makeup. There were a total of 410 housing units with an occupancy rate of 97.6%.

Historical population
Census	Pop.	Note	%±
1840	170		—
2010	816		—
2020	705		−13.6%
