= Steve Thurston =

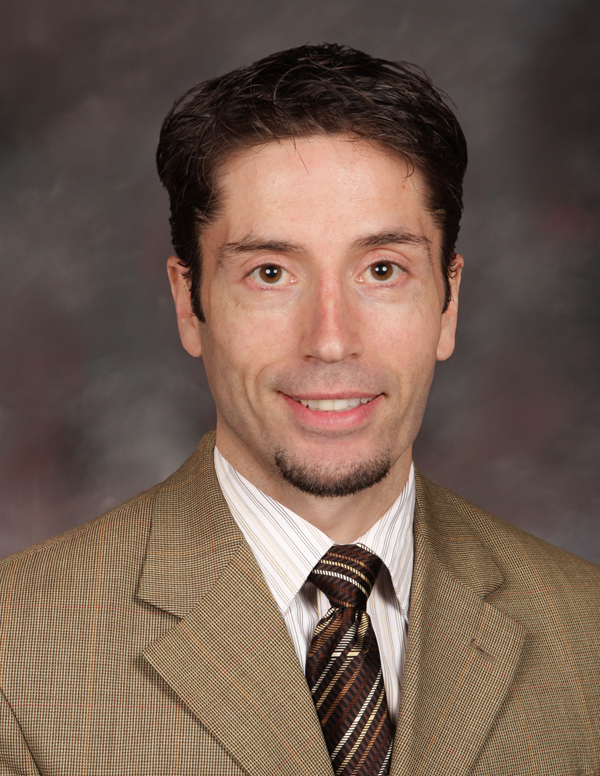
- Born: Steve Edward Thurston Gallegos; May 15, 1974 (age 52); Santiago, Chile
- Education: Messiah College (BA)
- Occupations: Journalist, Chief executive officer, President, Author, Associate Director of Marketing

Steve Thurston (born May 15, 1974) is a Chilean-American journalist, entrepreneur, humanitarian photographer and co-founder, CEO and president of Integrity Ministries (Integridad Network, Inc.), a non-profit media organization.

Thurston also founded the spiritual lifestyle website InterVizion.net in October 1997 which was subsequently rebranded and relaunched as Integridad.com, a Spanish Christian Lifestyle Community website on November 5, 2001. He also founded EnlaceMusical.com, an electronic magazine dedicated to the diffusion, promotion and distribution of Christian music on December 11, 2002. EnlaceMusical.com was rebranded as ZonaVertical.com in 2016. He also writes a column for ZonaVertical.com on leadership, ministry and inspirational thoughts as practical help for those struggling to live faithfully in a rapidly shifting culture.

== Biography ==
=== Family and education ===
Steve Thurston is the second born of three children to missionaries James and Lina Thurston. He was born in Santiago, Chile in 1974. His father James Edward Thurston, was a representative of Campus Crusade for Christ International, appointed to work in the Chilean university campuses. James later married Lina Yerin Gallegos Suñer and a decade later, after their work with Campus Crusade for Christ came to an end, they remained in Chile as independent missionaries.

Thurstons' education began in grade school at The International School Nido de Aguilas, in Chile. He continued his basic elementary and high school studies at Santiago Christian Academy from 1980 to 1993 in Santiago, Chile. He then studied Radio, Television and Film and attended Messiah College as well as Asbury University, formerly Asbury College in the United States. Through a specialized partnership between Messiah College and Temple University, Thurston also attended Temple University and received enhanced course offerings in Film and Media Arts. He later received his Bachelor of Arts from Messiah College in 1998.

During his studies at Messiah College, He participated in a program through Asbury University and the Atlanta Committee for the Olympic Games (ACOG) where he received training, and later worked in paid broadcasting positions at the Centennial Olympic Games in Atlanta, Georgia, United States in 1996 with Canadian Broadcasting Corporation and National Broadcasting Company.

=== Personal ===
In high school, Thurston became interested in various artistic endeavors, and began to write and became an amateur photographer. For several years, he continued to develop his photography skills while working various volunteer and paid jobs. Most notably, his work is primarily focused on live music events for Enlace Musical magazine at such events as Creation Festival, Premios ARPA and Expolit. Thurston currently volunteers his time as a humanitarian photographer, covering countries such as Chile, Nicaragua and Mexico.

== Career ==
In 1998, he started his career as Web administrator for the Law School Admission Council, a nonprofit corporation that provides products and services in the admissions process for law schools. He also was adjunct faculty at Valley Forge Christian College from August 2006 through May 2010 and taught Digital Media Photography, Design and Visual Language, and Advertising and Brand Leadership courses. He also served as Webmaster at Valley Forge Christian College until March 2011.

Thurston is an alliance partner with Global Christian Internet Alliance which includes partners from Christianity Today (United States), Top Chretien (France) and Kommunion (Norway). He is also one of the Christian leaders who have endorsed and supported the Internet Evangelism Day, to help develop strategies needed to use digital media for evangelism.

Thurston currently serves as associate director of marketing at Valley Forge Christian College, an accredited Christian college of Arts, Sciences and Professions, and continues his work with Integrity Ministries. He is also a member of the National Association of Hispanic Journalists.

== Awards and recognition ==
Chilean newspaper, El Mercurio, through its supplement, Zona de Contacto, awarded Thurston second place at their first annual video and film contest in 1992. In 2000, Thurston was awarded the Hispanic National Religious Broadcasters Presidential Award for his work serving Hispanics. Thurston is also the recipient of three Premios ARPA awards for his work on EnlaceMusical.com. The awards were given by the National Academy of Christian Music and Arts Association in 2005, 2007 and 2008.
