= William Black Homestead =

Historic house in Pennsylvania, United States

- U.S. National Register of Historic Places
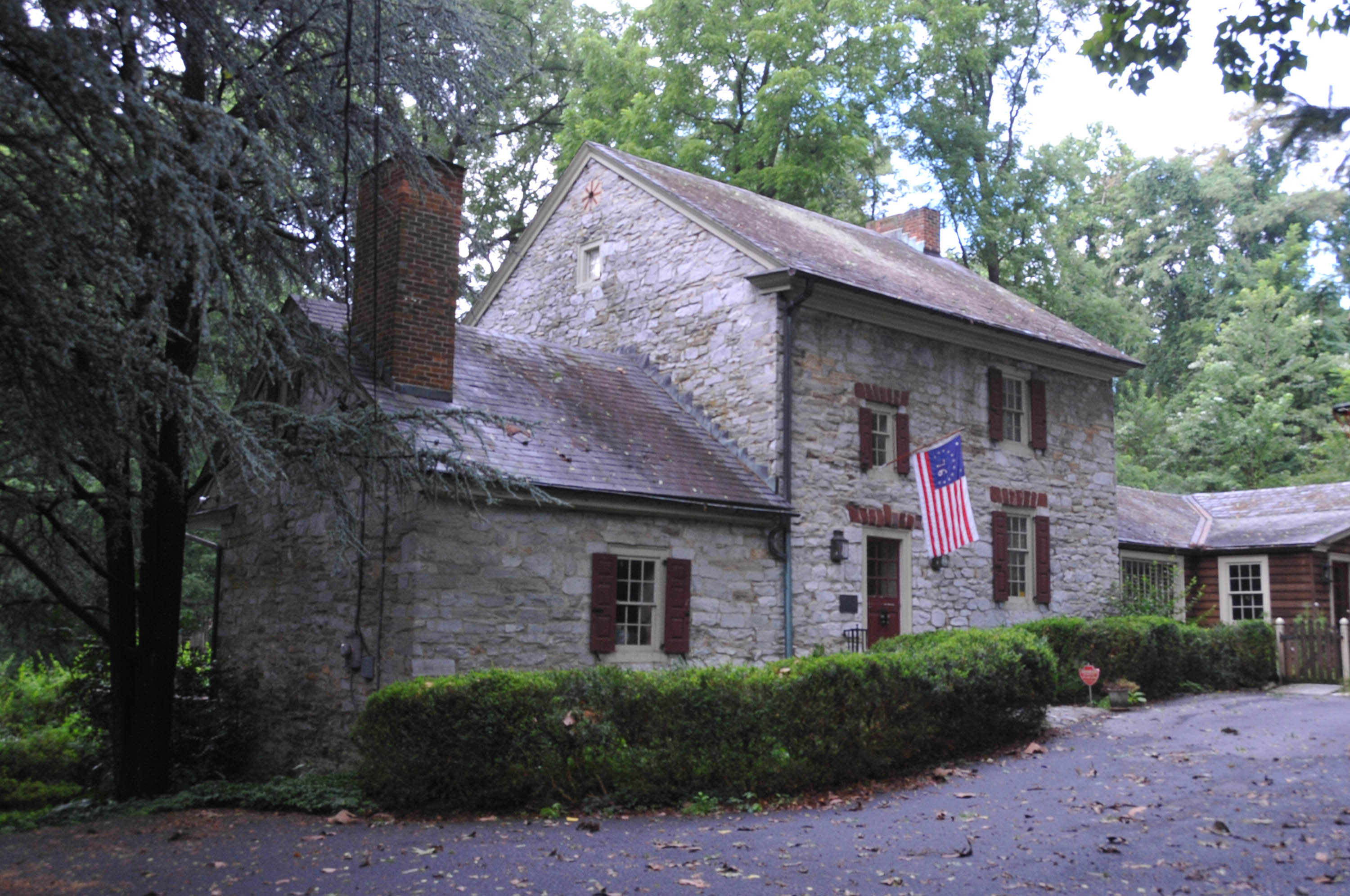

- Location within Pennsylvania Location within the United States
- Location: Drexel Hill Park Rd., New Cumberland, Pennsylvania
- Coordinates: 40°13′20″N 76°53′3″W
- Area: 1 acre (0.40 ha)
- Built: c. 1776
- NRHP reference No.: 77001159
- Added to NRHP: July 20, 1977

William Black Homestead is a historic home located at New Cumberland in Cumberland County, Pennsylvania. It was built about 1776, and consists of a 2 1/2-story, 3-bay, fieldstone main section with a gable roof, and a 1-story kitchen wing. The house was restored in 1960. A large one-story frame wing was added in 1975, containing modern amenities.

It was listed on the National Register of Historic Places in 1977.
