= Pennsylvania Route 944 =

State highway in Cumberland County, Pennsylvania, US

Pennsylvania Route 944

Route information
- Maintained by PennDOT
- Length: 30.869 mi (49.679 km)

Major junctions
- West end: PA 233 in Lower Mifflin Township
- PA 74 in North Middleton Township; PA 34 in Middlesex Township; PA 114 in Silver Spring Township; I-81 in Hampden Township
- East end: US 11 / US 15 in East Pennsboro Township

Location
- Country: United States
- State: Pennsylvania
- Counties: Cumberland

Highway system
- Pennsylvania State Route System; Interstate; US; State; Scenic; Legislative
← PA 943	→ PA 945

Pennsylvania Route 944 (PA 944) is a 31-mile-long (50 km) state highway located in Cumberland County, Pennsylvania. The western terminus is at PA 233 in Lower Mifflin Township. The eastern terminus is at U.S. Route 11 (US 11)/US 15 in East Pennsboro Township. PA 944 runs through northern Cumberland County a short distance south of Blue Mountain. The route heads east from PA 233 and runs through farmland, crossing PA 74 and forming a concurrency with PA 34. Farther east, PA 944 heads into the western suburbs of Harrisburg and intersects PA 114 in Wertzville before reaching an interchange with Interstate 81 (I-81). The route reaches Enola and comes to its end at US 11/US 15.

PA 944 was designated in 1928 between Wertzville and PA 5 (now US 11/US 15) in Enola. In 1937, the route was extended west and southwest to US 30 in western Franklin County, following its present route to PA 233 before heading southwest through Roxbury and Upper Strasburg to US 30. In the 1940s, the west end of PA 944 was cut back to PA 433/PA 641 in Roxbury; the former alignment southwest of there became unnumbered with a portion south of Upper Strasburg removed for the Letterkenny Army Depot. The western terminus of the route was truncated to its current location at PA 233 in the 1960s, with the road between Roxbury and PA 233 becoming a northern extension of PA 997.

== Route description ==
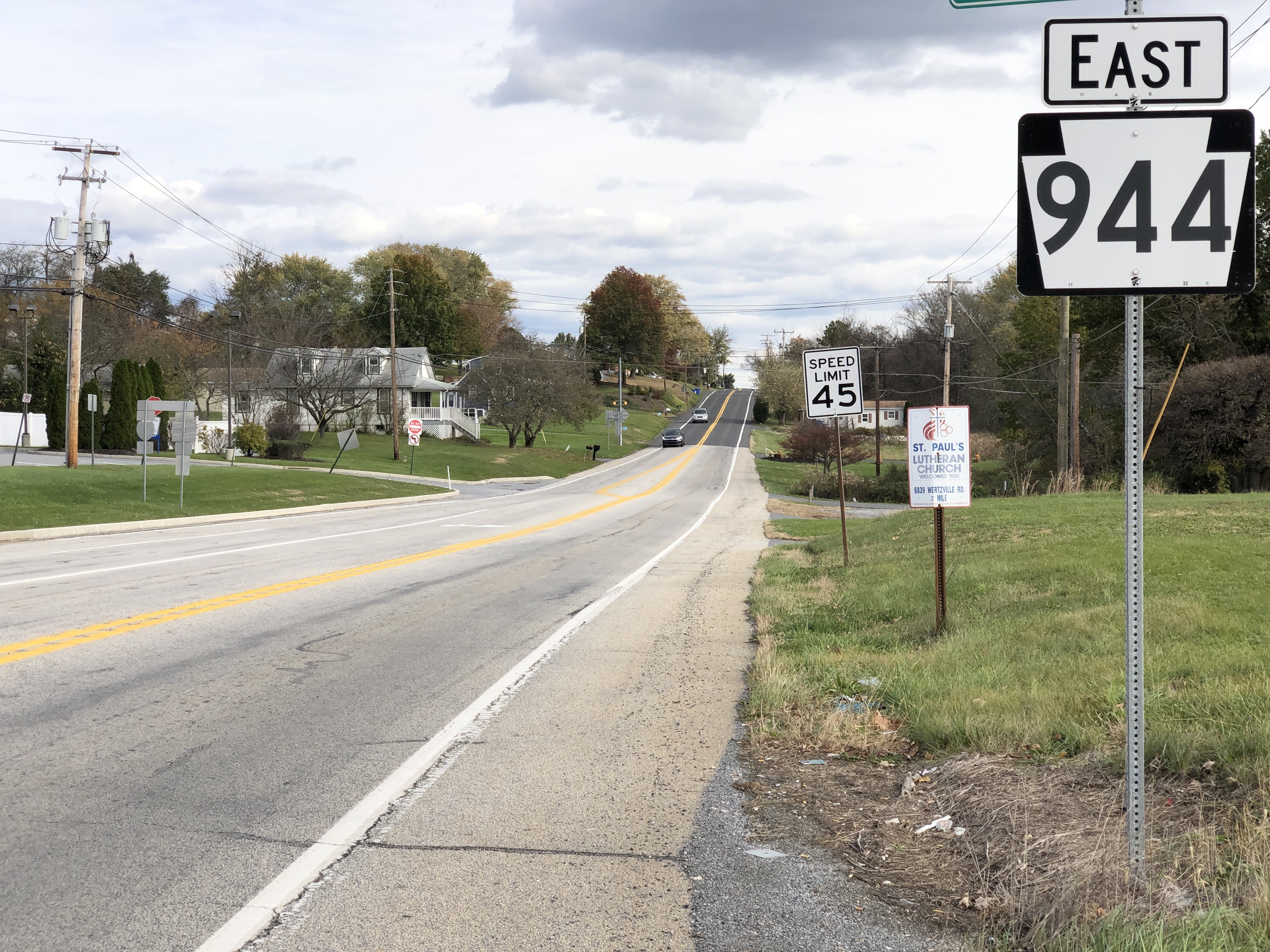
PA 944 eastbound past PA 114 in Wertzville

PA 944 begins at an intersection with PA 233 in Lower Mifflin Township, heading northeast on two-lane undivided Enola Road. The road heads through agricultural areas with some woods a short distance to the south of Blue Mountain, turning east and entering Upper Frankford Township. The route heads through more rural areas before coming to the residential community of Bloserville, where it turns north before curving back to the east. The road passes more farms before heading into Lower Frankford Township and running through a mix of woods and fields. Entering more agricultural areas, PA 944 curves northeast before heading east into North Middleton Township and intersecting PA 74. From this junction, the route continues east, heading through forests before passing more farms as it enters Middlesex Township. In this area, PA 944 comes to a junction with PA 34, at which point the route turns northeast to form a concurrency with that route on Spring Road, passing through the community of Carlisle Springs.

PA 944 splits from PA 34 by heading east onto Wertzville Road, passing through more farmland with occasional homes. The road curves north and then east again as it runs through a mix of farms and woods with some homes, passing through Donnellytown. The route crosses the Appalachian Trail and enters Silver Spring Township, continuing to an intersection with the western terminus of PA 114. From here, PA 944 heads into residential development, passing through Wertzville. The road heads through a mix of farms and development prior to entering Hampden Township. Here, the route passes through suburban residential subdivisions prior to widening into a four-lane divided highway and reaching a diamond interchange with I-81 (Capital Beltway). Following this, PA 944 narrows back into a two-lane undivided road and passes through woods before heading near more residential neighborhoods, crossing into East Pennsboro Township. In this area, the road passes more inhabited subdivisions along with some commercial development, running through West Enola. The route heads through woodland, coming into Enola where it turns south onto South Enola Drive, passing homes. PA 944 curves to the southeast and bears left onto State Street, reaching its eastern terminus at US 11/US 15 in West Fairview; this intersection has no access from PA 944 to northbound US 11/US 15.

== History ==
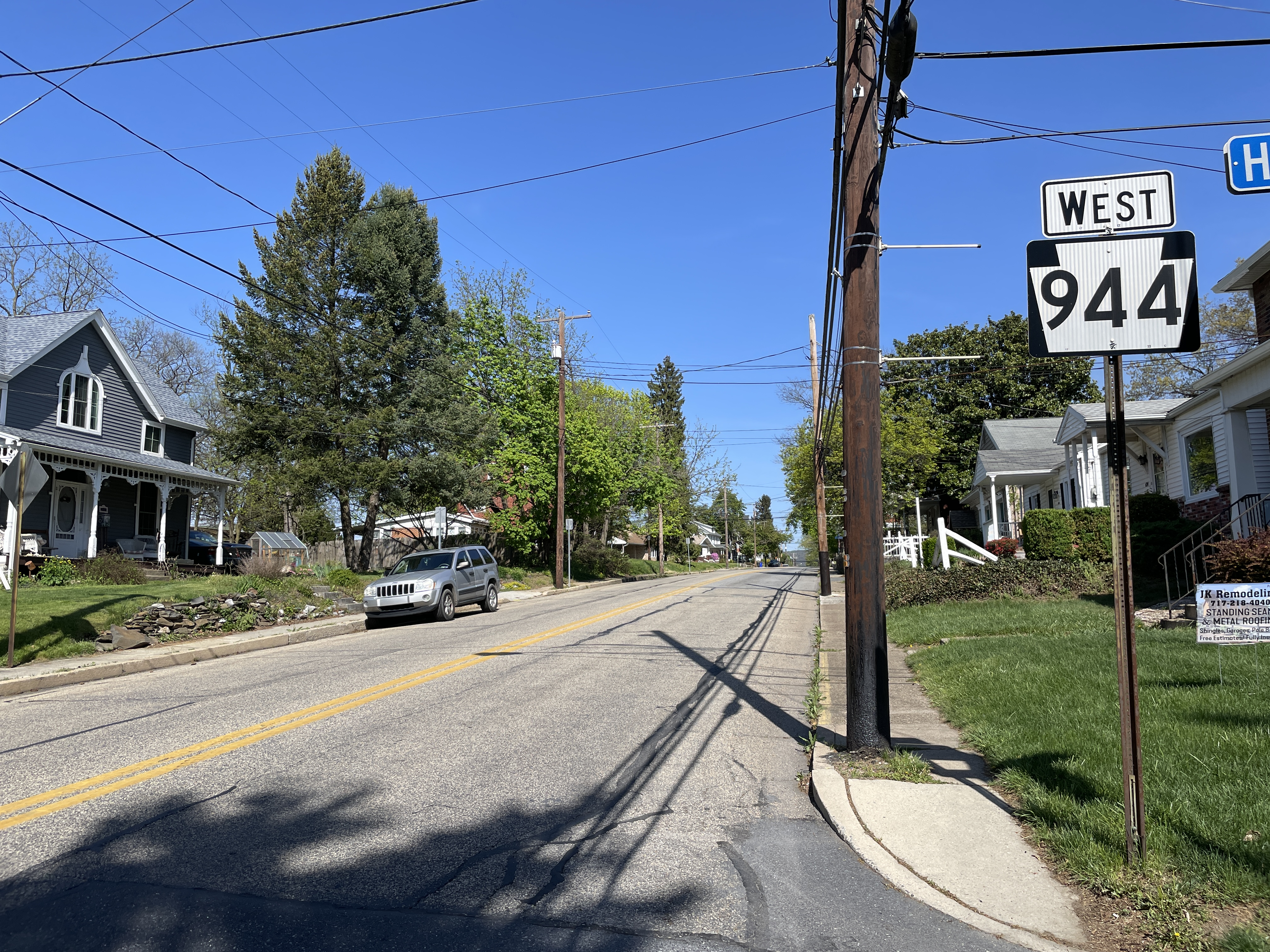
PA 944 westbound in Enola

When routes were legislated in Pennsylvania in 1911, what is now PA 944 was not assigned a number. By this time, Wertzville Road was an unpaved road. The road between Wertzville and Enola later became Legislative Route 569. PA 944 was designated in 1928 to run from Wertzville east to PA 5 (now US 11/US 15) in Enola. At this time the entire length of the route was unpaved except for the easternmost portion. Upon designation, plans were made to improve this stretch of road. On February 25, 1929, a bill passed that would extend PA 944 west from Wertzville to Carlisle Springs as well another bill that authorized the state to take over the road between Newburg and McCrea. By 1930, the unpaved portion of the route was under construction. PA 944 was extended from Wertzville southwest to US 30 between Fort Loudon and St. Thomas in Franklin County in 1937, following its current alignment west to PA 233 before it continued southwest through Roxbury and Upper Strasburg to US 30. The entire length of PA 944 was paved in the 1930s except between south of Maple Grove and PA 316 south of Upper Strasburg and for a distance to the south of Roxbury. In the 1940s, the western terminus of PA 944 was cut back to PA 433/PA 641 in Roxbury. The section of the former route between Roxbury and US 30 became unnumbered, with a portion of road to the south of Upper Strasburg removed to make way for the Letterkenny Army Depot. In the 1960s, the western terminus of PA 944 was truncated to its current location at PA 233, with the former alignment between Roxbury and PA 233 becoming a northern extension of PA 997.

== Major intersections ==
The entire route is in Cumberland County.

Location	mi	km	Destinations	Notes
Lower Mifflin Township	0.000	0.000	PA 233 (Doubling Gap Road) – Newville, Landisburg, Roxbury	Western terminus
North Middleton Township	11.268	18.134	PA 74 (Waggoners Gap Road) – Landisburg, Carlisle	
Middlesex Township	16.509	26.569	PA 34 south (Spring Road) – Carlisle	West end of PA 34 overlap
Middlesex Township	16.833	27.090	PA 34 north (Spring Road) – New Bloomfield	East end of PA 34 overlap
Silver Spring Township	23.435	37.715	PA 114 east (Conodoguinet Parkway) to I-81 – Mechanicsburg	Western terminus of PA 114
Hampden Township	27.033	43.505	I-81 (Capital Beltway) – Harrisburg, Carlisle	Exit 61 on I-81
East Pennsboro Township	30.869	49.679	US 11 south / US 15 south (South Enola Road) – Harrisburg, Camp Hill	Eastern terminus
1.000 mi = 1.609 km; 1.000 km = 0.621 mi: Concurrency terminus
