= Yellow Breeches Creek =

River in the United States of America

Coordinates: 40.18674°N 76.92794°W

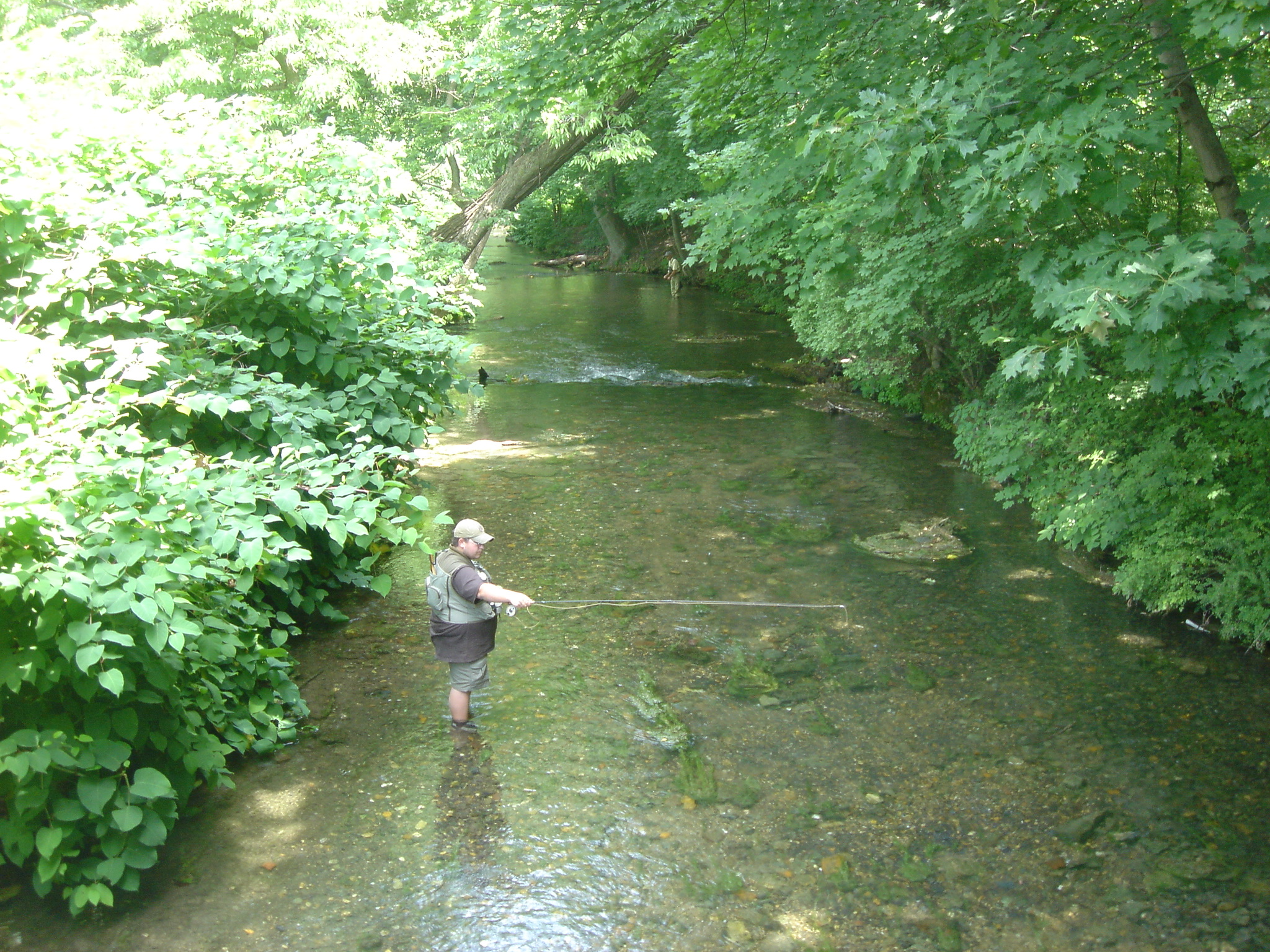
Fishing in the Boiling Springs Lake tributary to the Yellow Breeches Creek in Boiling Springs

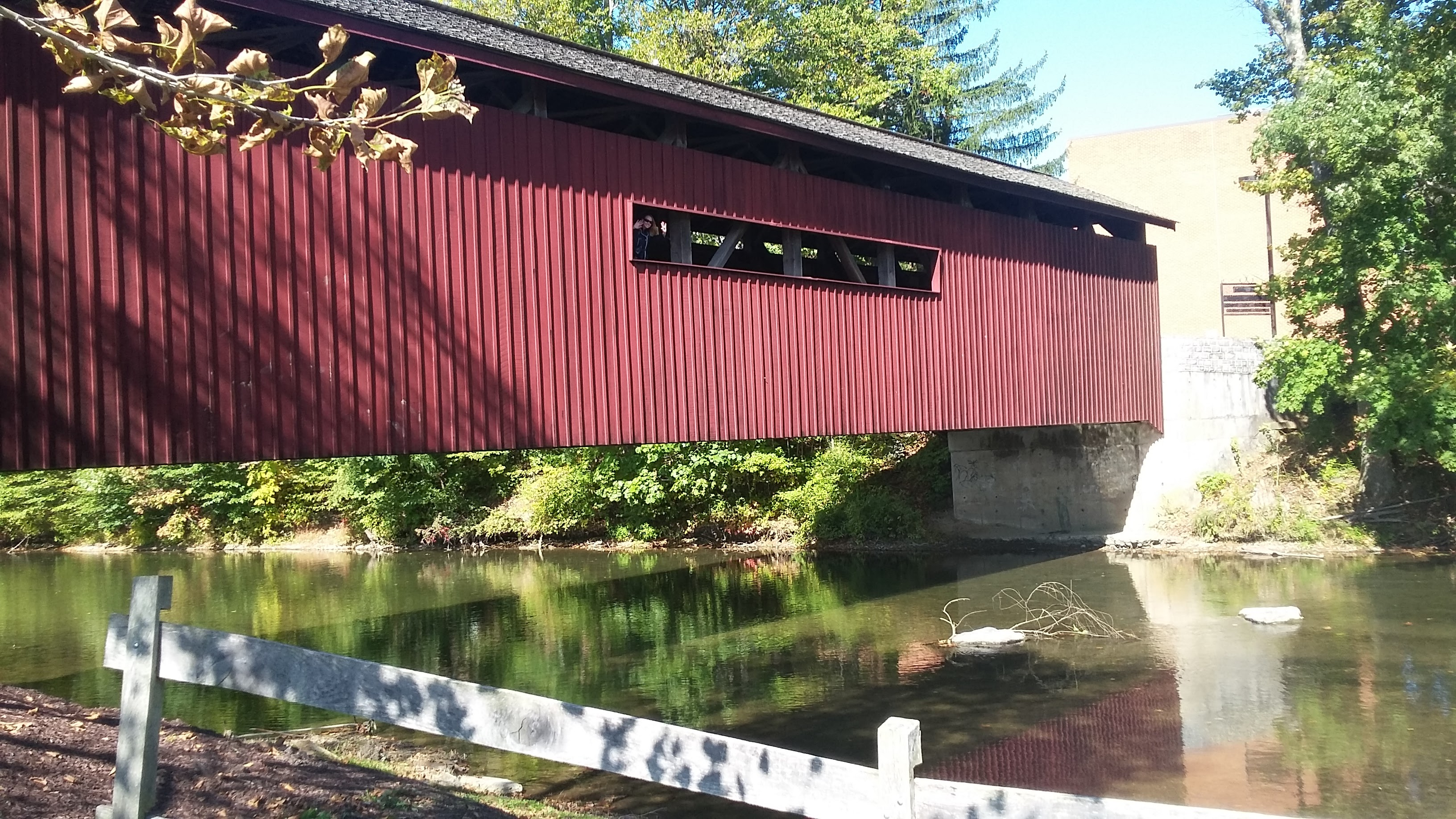
Covered bridge over the Creek at Messiah University

Yellow Breeches Creek, also known as Callapatscink Creek, Callapatschink Creek (Lenape for "where it returns") or Shawnee Creek is a 56.1-mile-long (90.3 km) tributary of the Susquehanna River in central Pennsylvania, USA. There is no agreed upon explanation for the name Yellow Breeches Creek, which is found in land warrants as early as 1736.

== Description ==
In 1718 Peter Chartier and his father Martin established a trading post about a mile north of the Yellow Breeches along the Susquehanna River. Chartiers Landing was located just off the river between what are now 15th and 16th Streets in New Cumberland, Pennsylvania.

Yellow Breeches Creek rises on the northwestern side of South Mountain, in the Michaux State Forest, and collects the drainage of several hollows along the mountainside. It flows north through Walnut Bottom and turns east to run down the Cumberland Valley, paralleled by an ex-Reading Railroad line. It passes through Huntsdale, site of the Huntsdale State Fish Hatchery. The creek begins to meander, and swings around the north side of Mount Holly Springs. Just below the town, it is joined by Mountain Creek. Old Town Run enters just before the creek passes along the south side of Boiling Springs and the spring-fed lake that gives the town its name. The Boiling Springs Lake tributary (photo) enters Yellow Breeches Creek east of the town. The tributary's crystal clear water is a popular trout fishing spot.

The creek passes through Williams Grove and meets Dogwood Run just downstream. Below Williams Grove, it forms the boundary between Cumberland and York counties. It flows through the campus of Messiah University, then is joined by Stony Run and enters a series of sharp meanders as the railroad line swings away to the north. Pippins Run joins it, and it flows east to Lisburn, where it makes a sharp turn to flow northwest. It turns north, and then makes a number of meanders to turn east, cutting through the suburbs of New Cumberland. Cedar Run enters near the top of the northernmost meander. It cuts east, then north again, emptying into the Susquehanna.

Known for its great fishing, the Yellow Breeches is a popular spot for fly fishers who flock to the mile-long catch and release section near Boiling Springs. The Yellow Breeches is stocked by the Pennsylvania Fish and Boat Commission as well as the Yellow Breeches Anglers' Club. It is one of the designated Pennsylvania Scenic Rivers.

Several protected species designated by the state of Pennsylvania can be found in the Yellow Breeches Creek Watershed. The Bog Turtle and the Eastern Mud Salamander are listed as Pennsylvania threatened species, and the Sedge Wren is listed as a Pennsylvania endangered species.

The Etters Bridge crosses Yellow Breeches Creek in Fairview Township and Lower Allen Township, Pennsylvania. The Gilbert Bridge crosses Yellow Breeches Creek in Monaghan Township, York County, Pennsylvania and Upper Allen Township, Pennsylvania.

== Tributaries ==
- Cedar Run
- Pippins Run
- Stony Run
- Dogwood Run
- Old Town Run
- Mountain Creek
- Boiling Springs Lake Run

== See also ==
- List of rivers of Pennsylvania
