= Upper Allen Township, Pennsylvania =

Township in Pennsylvania, US

Coordinates: 40°10′00″N 76°58′59″W

- Township
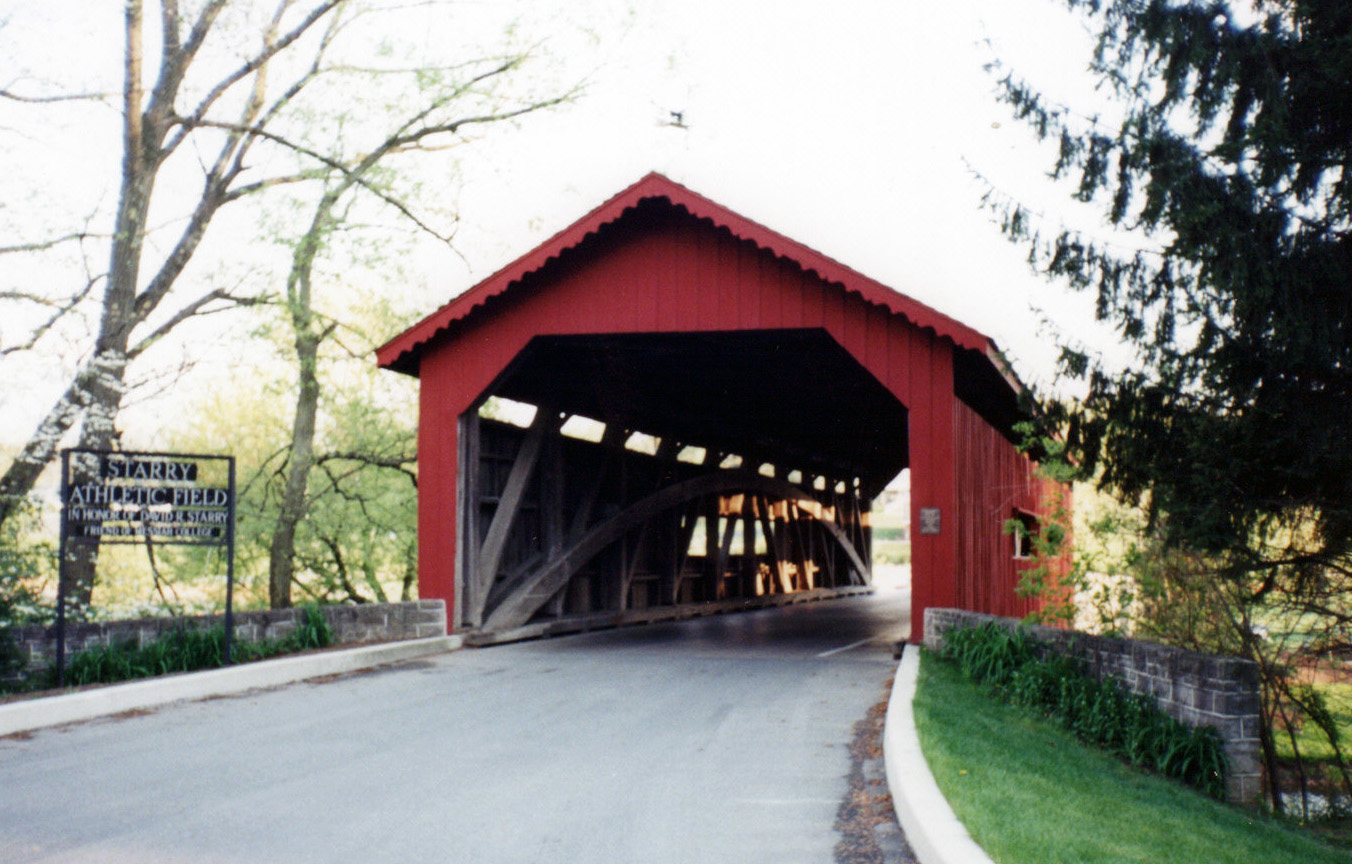
- A covered bridge at Messiah University in Upper Allen Township

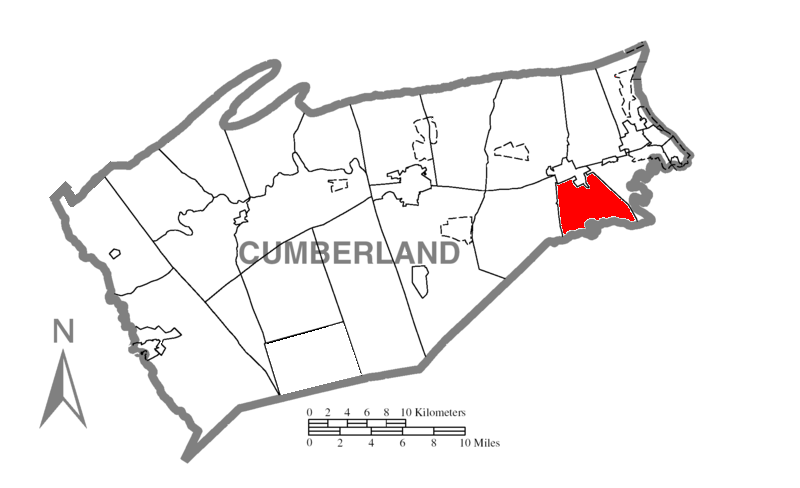
- Map of Cumberland County, Pennsylvania highlighting Upper Allen Township

- Map of Cumberland County, Pennsylvania
- Country: United States
- State: Pennsylvania
- County: Cumberland
- Incorporated: 1850

Government
  - Type: Board of Commissioners
  - President: Eric Y. Fairchild
  - Vice President: Karen Overly Smith
  - Commissioner: Kenneth M. Martin
  - Commissioner: Phil J. Walsh
  - Commissioner: Jennifer A. Clark

Area
  - Total: 13.30 sq mi (34.45 km^{2})
  - Land: 13.20 sq mi (34.18 km^{2})
  - Water: 0.10 sq mi (0.27 km^{2})

Population (2020)
  - Total: 23,183
  - Estimate (2020 (est.)): 23,197
  - Density: 1,501.6/sq mi (579.79/km^{2})
- Time zone: UTC-5 (Eastern (EST))
  - Summer (DST): UTC-4 (EDT)
- Area code: 717
- FIPS code: 42-041-78736
- Website: www.uatwp.org

Historical population
Census	Pop.	Note	%±
2010	18,059		—
2020	23,183		28.4%
2021 (est.)	23,197		0.1%
U.S. Decennial Census

Upper Allen Township is a township in Cumberland County, Pennsylvania, United States. The population was 23,183 at the 2020 census, up from 18,059 at the 2010 census.

== Geography ==
The township is in eastern Cumberland County, bordered by the borough of Mechanicsburg to the north and York County to the south. Interstate 76, the Pennsylvania Turnpike, crosses the northern part of the township from east to west, while the U.S. Route 15 freeway crosses the township from northeast to southwest. Three highway interchanges provide access from US 15 to the township, while a fourth connects to Exit 236 on the Pennsylvania Turnpike. From the US 15/I-76 interchange it is 8 miles (13 km) northeast to Harrisburg, the state capital, and 31 miles (50 km) southwest to Gettysburg, both via US 15, while it is 111 miles (179 km) east to Philadelphia and 196 miles (315 km) west to Pittsburgh via the Turnpike.

According to the United States Census Bureau, the township has a total area of 13.3 square miles (34.4 km^{2}), of which 13.2 square miles (34.2 km^{2}) is land and 0.1 square miles (0.3 km^{2}), or 0.78%, is water. Yellow Breeches Creek forms the southern border of the township, separating it from York County.

Several unincorporated communities are in the township, including Grantham, Bowmansdale, Shepherdstown, Nantilly, Stumpstown, Mt. Allen, Kollertown, Winding Heights, and Winding Hill (not to be confused with the Winding Hills development). The campus of Messiah University is defined as a census-designated place for population statistics.

== Demographics ==
As of the census of 2020, there were 23,183 people and 7,893 households residing in the township. The population density was 1,750.1 inhabitants per square mile (675.7/km^{2}). The racial makeup of the township was 86% White, 6.3% African American, 0.2% Native American, 4.0% Asian, 2.4% from two or more races. Hispanic or Latino of any race were 1.9% of the population.

There were 7,893 households, out of which 19.5% had children under the age of 18 living with them, 61.5% were married couples living together, 7.5% had a female householder with no husband present, and 28.8% were non-families. 24.3% of all households were made up of individuals, and 9.4% had someone living alone who was 65 years of age or older. The average household size was 2.28 and the average family size was 2.95.

In the township the population was spread out, with 19.8% under the age of 18, 19.2% from 18 to 24, 23.3% from 25 to 44, 22.3% from 45 to 64, and 15.5% who were 65 years of age or older. The median age was 36 years. For every 100 females, there were 83.7 males. For every 100 females age 18 and over, there were 79.4 males.

The median income for a household in the township was $86,817, and the median income for a family was $65,349. Males had a median income of $45,589 versus $30,103 for females. The per capita income for the township was $45,486. About 2.9% of families and 4.2% of the population were below the poverty line, including 5.8% of those under age 18 and 4.1% of those age 65 or over.

== Education ==
Upper Allen Township residents are served by the Mechanicsburg Area School District. Shepherdstown Elementary, Upper Allen Elementary, and Mechanicsburg Middle School are located within Upper Allen Township. Mechanicsburg Area Senior High School is in Mechanicsburg borough.

Upper Allen Township was previously served by Upper Allen School District, which operated 12 one-room schoolhouses throughout its existence. In 1953, these schools were merged into a new, larger school known as Upper Allen Elementary (now known as Shepherdstown Elementary). In 1964, Upper Allen School District and Mechanicsburg School District combined to form Mechanicsburg Area School District.

Additionally, the township is home to Messiah University.

== Recreation ==
The township has several parks, including Fisher Park, Winding Hill Park, Friendship Park, Simpson Park, McCormick Park, Generations Park, Grantham Park, Mt. Allen Park, Spring Run Acres Park, Trout Run Park (formerly Center Square Park), Miller's Crest, Country Estates Park, Rosegarden Park, and Aspen Park. Upper Allen has received various awards for recent park additions, including the Excellence in Recreation Award from the PA Recreation and Parks Society. The township is also accredited as a Certified Autism Center for inclusivity within its parks.

Upper Allen Township operates the Upper Allen Dog Park and helps maintain Koser Park within the Borough of Mechanicsburg. The township works with the Mechanicsburg Area Recreation Department to manage the Mechanicsburg Area Community Pool, which residents can purchase membership at a reduced price.

Upper Allen Township has been named a certified Bird Town by Bird Town Pennsylvania. The Appalachian Audubon Society maintains Trout Run Nature Preserve, a 21.4-acre spring-fed wetland within the township. The nearby Trout Run Park also includes a preserved wetland area with a nature trail. Grantham Pond within Grantham Park, fed by Trout Run, is a popular fishing spot.

Trails and Trees Environmental Center, operated by the Mechanicsburg Area School District, contains a large wooded area used for educational and recreational purposes. A mountain bike trail system was constructed there in 2022.
