= Mechanicsburg Area School District =

School district in Pennsylvania

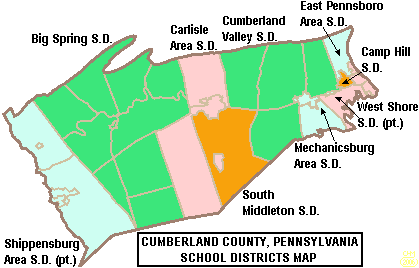

Address
- 600 South Norway Street, 2nd Floor Mechanicsburg, Cumberland County, Pennsylvania, 17055; United States

District information
- Type: Public
- Superintendent: Andrew Bitz
- Asst. superintendent(s): Dr. Christopher Bowman
- School board: Richard Bradley, Tracy Morgan, Katie Dang, Peter Frengel, Julie Huff, Deborah Kearns, Jason Kichline, Layne Lebo, Morgan Strehlow
- Chair of the board: Richard Bradley

Students and staff
- District mascot: Wildcats

Other information
- Website: www.mbgsd.org

The Mechanicsburg Area School District is a midsized, suburban, public school district serving the Harrisburg suburbs of Mechanicsburg and Upper Allen Township in Cumberland County, Pennsylvania. The Mechanicsburg Area School District encompasses approximately 16 square miles (41 km^{2}). According to the 2000 federal census data, it served a resident population of 25,901. In 2010, the population had grown to 28,664 people. The US Census Bureau reported that district residents' per capita income was $23,507 while the median family income was $60,722 a year.

Mechanicsburg Area School District operates: Kindergarten Academy, Broad Street Elementary School, Northside Elementary School, Shepherdstown Elementary School, Upper Allen Elementary School, Elmwood Academy, Mechanicsburg Middle School and Mechanicsburg Area Senior High School. In addition, the District owns the Trails & Trees Environmental Center, 30-acre (120,000 m^{2}) education area behind the middle school.

The district includes the Messiah University census-designated place.

== Extracurriculars ==
Mechanicsburg Area School District offers a wide variety of clubs, activities and an extensive sports program.

=== Sports ===
The District funds:

Boys

- Baseball - AAAA
- Basketball- AAAA
- Cross Country - Class AAA
- Football - AAAA
- Golf -AAA
- Soccer - AAA
- Swimming and Diving - Class AAA
- Tennis - AAA
- Track and Field - AAA
- Water Polo - Class AAAA
- Wrestling - AAA

Girls

- Basketball - AAAA
- Cross Country - AAA
- Field Hockey - AAA
- Golf - AAA
- Soccer (Fall) - AAA
- Softball - AAAA
- Girls' Tennis - AAA
- Track and Field - AAA
- Volleyball - AAA
- Water Polo - AAAA

Middle School Sports

Boys

- Basketball
- Cross County
- Football
- Soccer
- Wrestling

Girls

- Basketball
- Cross Country
- Field Hockey
- Volleyball

According to PIAA directory July 2012
