= Lisburn, Pennsylvania =

Unincorporated community in Pennsylvania, US

Lisburn is a small village located in Lower Allen Township, Cumberland County, Pennsylvania, United States. It was named after Lisburn in Northern Ireland. The village dates back to the early 19th century, and was for a time a stop on the Underground Railroad. In the past there was a post office and were many stores, but they have since closed up, and have been turned into homes.

The village is home to the Lower Allen Township Park and Lisburn Fire Department, which hosts a four-day Olde Tyme Festival every year in August. The festival includes amusement rides, homemade food, games and live music. There is a small cemetery located next to the fire hall that dates back to the 19th century. Yellow Breeches Creek winds around the village.
