= Messiah University =

Private university in Grantham, Pennsylvania, US

- Former names: Messiah Bible School and Missionary Training Home (1909–1921); Messiah Bible School (1921–1951); Messiah College (1951–2020)
- Motto: Christ Preeminent
- Type: Private university
- Established: 1909; 117 years ago
- Religious affiliation: Founded by Brethren in Christ Church; currently interdenominational
- Academic affiliations: Christian College Consortium, Council for Christian Colleges and Universities
- Endowment: $141.1 million (2025)
- President: Jon C. Stuckey
- Provost: Christine J. Gardner
- Faculty: 173 full-time
- Undergraduates: 2,495
- Postgraduates: 736
- Location: near Mechanicsburg, Pennsylvania, U.S. 40.1553°N 76.9933°W
- Campus: Suburban/rural
- Colors: Navy & white
- Nickname: Falcons
- Sporting affiliations: NCAA Division III, the Middle Atlantic Conferences
- Mascot: Flex the Falcon
- Website: messiah.edu
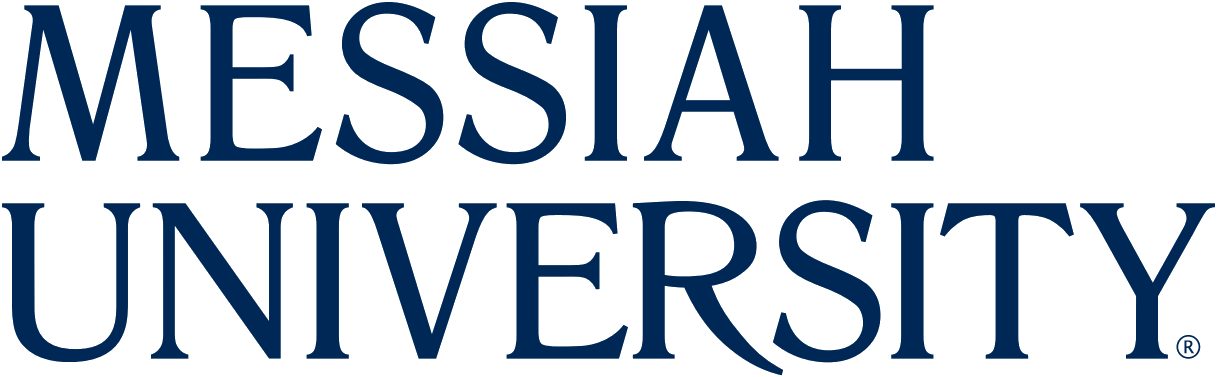

Messiah University is a private interdenominational evangelical Christian university with its main campus in Grantham, Pennsylvania and Upper Allen Township, Pennsylvania, near Mechanicsburg.

== History ==
The school was founded as "Messiah Bible School and Missionary Training Home" in 1909 by the Brethren in Christ Church. Originally located in Harrisburg, Pennsylvania, in the home of Messiah's first president, Samuel Rogers (S.R.) Smith, a local businessman and leader in the Brethren in Christ Church, the school was moved to Grantham in 1911, following the construction of the campus' first building, Old Main. (The university now uses a Mechanicsburg mailing address, but its main campus is still located in Grantham.) The building was constructed on land donated by S.R. Smith, who had moved his home and various business interests outside of the city to allow for growth in the farmlands surrounding Grantham. In the early years, the school offered a high school curriculum and several Bible programs. By 1921, it had also become a junior college, making it the second junior college in Pennsylvania, and changed its name to "Messiah Bible School". The campus covers 375 acres.

By the 1950s, the school offered four-year college programs and accordingly in 1951 it changed its name to "Messiah College". Messiah discontinued its high school program in 1959 and added liberal arts programs during this period. It was accredited as a four-year college in 1963, and continued to expand its liberal arts programs.

In 1964, Messiah College took over the operations of "Upland College" in Upland, California, a Brethren in Christ Church college that had been operating since the 1920s. The Upland campus was closed and all operations were consolidated to Pennsylvania. Four years later, Messiah College opened its Philadelphia Campus in a partnership with Temple University. This campus closed at the end of the Spring 2014 semester.

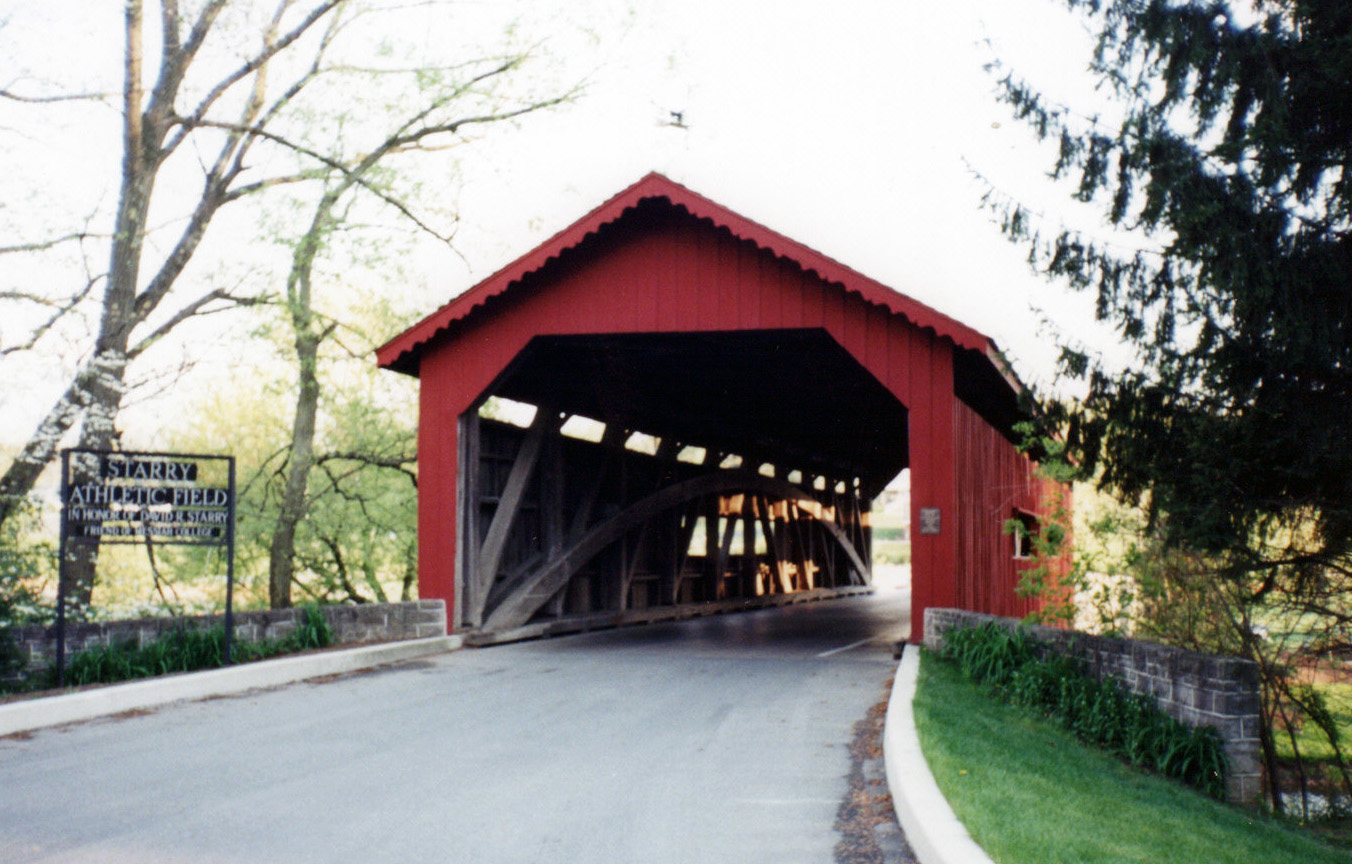
Historic covered bridge on Messiah University campus

In 2002, Messiah College's Harrisburg Institute was founded in downtown Harrisburg. Its purpose was to serve as an academic and research center and connect students with the unique needs of an urban environment. The institute also provided housing for up to 25 students.

Following the US Justice Department Scandal involving alumna Monica Goodling in 2007, several members of the media ridiculed Messiah College. Jon Stewart on The Daily Show referred to Messiah as a school "where people have faith that they'll receive a quality education, and yet somehow it never arrives," and "that everyone in the God business knows (Messiah) is a 'savior school'." Bill Maher also mocked Messiah, calling it "the home of the Fighting Christies."

Even though it is no longer owned by the Brethren in Christ Church, Messiah continues to be influenced by its traditions, primarily in the Anabaptist, but also the Radical Pietist and Wesleyan holiness movements. Today, it is a nondenominational Christian college, with a faith base that is broadly evangelical and includes students and employees from a variety of denominations and Christian faith traditions.

In July 2020, Messiah College became Messiah University.

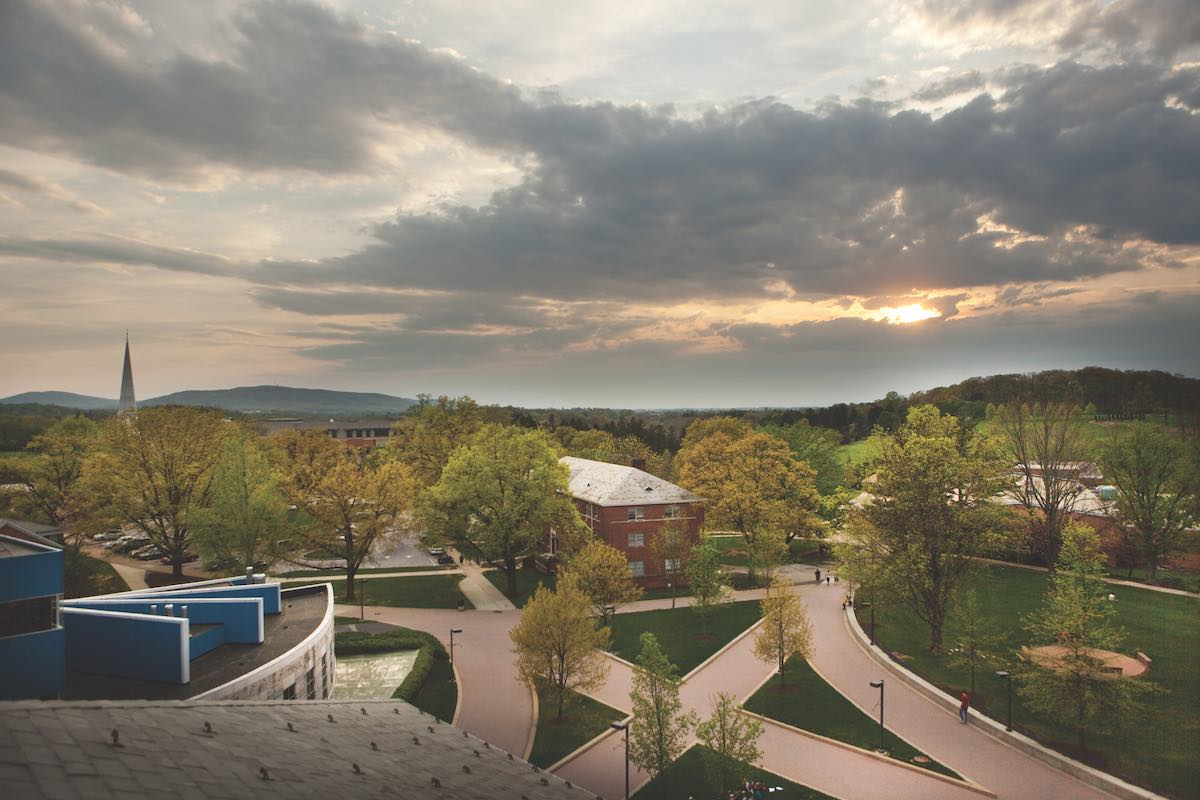
Photo of the Messiah University campus taken from above Kline Hall in the Fall of 2016

=== 2008 Compassion Forum ===
The Compassion Forum was a question-and-answer session hosted by Messiah in which CNN commentators Jon Meacham and Campbell Brown as well as select members of the audience posed questions about Faith and Politics to Democratic political candidates Hillary Clinton and Barack Obama. The forum took place on April 13, 2008, and was given live national coverage by CNN. The event was organized by the religious organization Faith in Public Life. John McCain was invited to participate in the event but declined the invitation, citing a schedule conflict.

== Academics ==
Messiah University offers more than 150 undergraduate majors, minors, concentrations, teaching certificates and pre-professional advising options in two schools: the School of Arts, Culture and Society; and the School of Science, Engineering and Health. In addition to major requirements, there is a general education curriculum, required for all students. General education requirements include but are not limited to one or more classes in theology, philosophy, literature, social sciences, art, world views, and physical education. Students are also required to take first year and senior seminars.

Messiah University awards Bachelor of Arts and Bachelor of Science degrees in the liberal and applied arts and sciences. Specialized programs include extensive off-campus study, individualized majors, independent study, service-learning, internships, allied health programs in partnership with other institutions and a College Honors Program. Some majors allow students to graduate one or two semesters early, depending on their particular field of study.

In 2009, Messiah University launched its first graduate programs, and currently offers master's programs. It also offers certificate programs along with an ACEND-accredited dietetic internship program.

Messiah University students have earned academic honors and fellowships such as Rhodes, Fulbright, Carnegie, Truman and Boren scholarships. Joy Yu-Ho Wang became Messiah University's first Rhodes Scholar in 1997.

Messiah University's academic year is divided into Fall and Spring Terms. The January Term, or J-Term, was a three-and-a-half-week period where students could choose to take one course intensively, participate in a cross cultural study program or simply stay home for an extended vacation. J-Term was discontinued in 2021.

The university is accredited by the Middle States Commission on Higher Education. Academic programs in engineering, dietetics, nursing, athletic training, music, social work, education, theater, business, art and design, counseling and occupational therapy are each accredited by professional associations.

=== International programs ===
In 2015, the institution was ranked 25th among all undergraduate institutions in the country that send students to study abroad by the Institute for International Education's Open Doors Report. In 2014–2015, more than 500 Messiah students earned academic credit by studying abroad in more than 40 different countries.

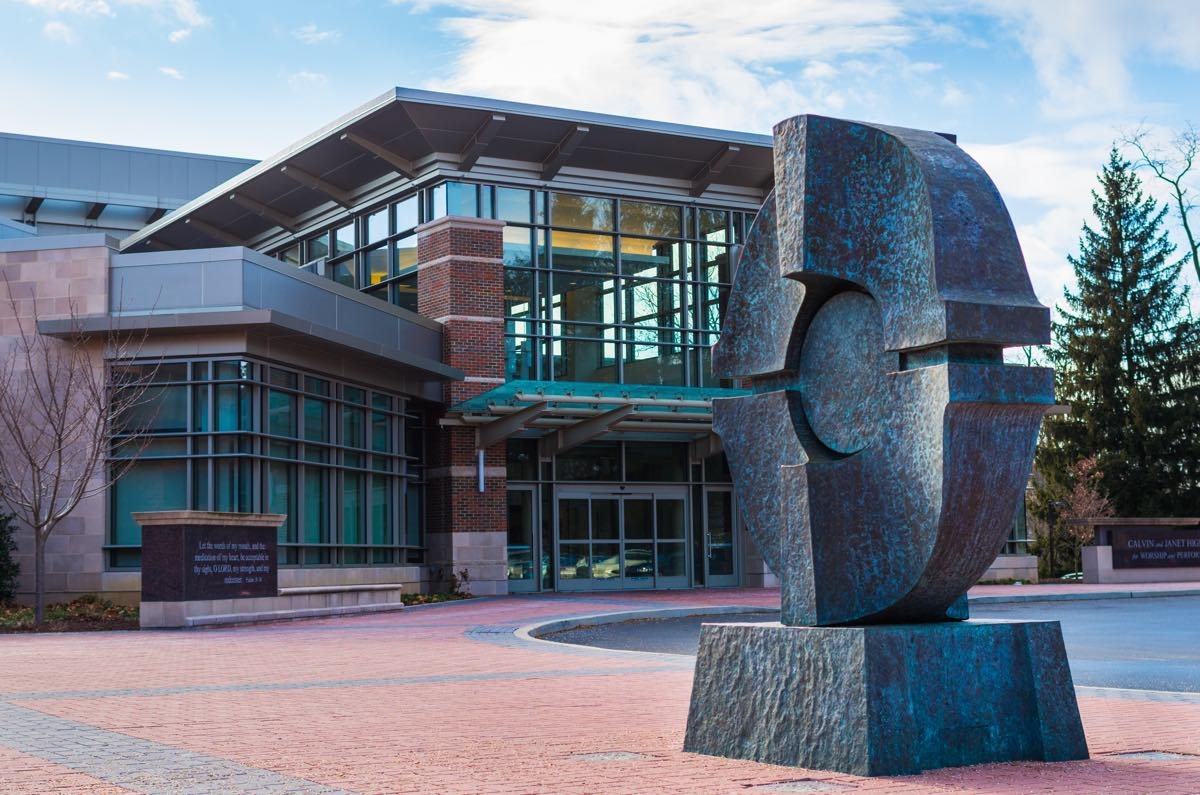
The Calvin and Janet High Center for Worship and Performing Arts is a 92,000-square-foot (8,500 m^{2}) facility with classroom, office and rehearsal space for the School of the Arts. The centerpiece of the building is Parmer Hall, a performance hall complete with a choir loft and pipe organ. Also within the center is the High Foundation Recital Hall.

Cross-cultural courses are offered during May term. These trips are led by faculty members, and students earn credits by participating in an intense three-week study of a particular geographic region or culture. Messiah University students can also participate in the International Business Institute (IBI), an overseas program in international economics and business designed to give students an opportunity to integrate academic study with international field experience. Students who travel with IBI during the summer visit corporate headquarters, manufacturing plants, and government and international agencies across Europe and Asia. Students can also work in a variety of fields through an international internship.

== Spiritual life ==
=== Community Covenant ===
Students at Messiah University are required to sign a Community Covenant upon entering. The document states that every person is created in the image of God, and that there are certain responsibilities of living in community that must also be assumed in relation to God, others, and his creation.

The Community Covenant affirms belief in God and the Bible. The Covenant requires commitment to academic integrity, responsible decision making in light of Christian values, and balancing personal freedom with concern for others. The Covenant bans both on- and off-campus the use of illegal drugs, alcohol, and tobacco as well as gambling, profanity, "occult practices," sexual intercourse outside of marriage, and "same-sex sexual expression." It also prescribes the avoidance of drunkenness, stealing, and dishonesty. The covenant also prohibits certain attitudes, such as greed, lust, and jealousy, but allows that these attributes are typically expressed less outwardly.

==== LGBT prohibition ====
Messiah's student handbook prohibits "same-sex sexual expression" including identifying as a couple or expressing physical intimacy, although heterosexual couples are specifically allowed to do these things by the handbook. Unlike many religious schools with a similar policy, Messiah has never requested a Title IX exemption for permission to discriminate against LGBT students.

The university's stance on homosexuality, as stated in the Community Covenant, has been a source of contention and controversy amongst the student body, administration, and alumni. A number of articles have been published concerning the issue in the university's student newspaper, the Swinging Bridge, as well as in local media.

An alumni group, Inclusive Alumni, was formed in support of the former student Isaiah Thomas and aimed at changing the institution's policy. Isaiah Thomas transferred out of Messiah in May 2011, after saying he was harassed by various students and a professor. He also said he had received a death threat via Facebook. He said that the institution said that they had followed up on his reports of harassment but refused to change the policy.

=== Chapel ===
Full-time residential students at Messiah University are expected to attend 14 chapels each semester. Full-time commuters are expected to attend 7 chapels per semester. They are free to choose from over 40 unique chapel opportunities to fulfill that requirement.

In addition to chapel services, Messiah University provides discipleship groups, ministry outreach teams, community service, mission trips and other special programs such as "Powerhouse," a weekly student-led contemporary worship service.

== Student activities ==
Students at Messiah University can spend their free time participating in many activities, including but not limited to intramural sports leagues, participating in various clubs, watching on-campus movies, and eating at local diners. Underclassmen can also participate in floor activities organized by their RAs. The Student Government Association funds 60+ organizations on campus that aim at providing a co-curricular atmosphere conducive to a holistic education and a more enjoyable experience while enrolled at Messiah. The SGA also provides students with opportunity to influence governance and overall institutional prerogatives.

Messiah University's Student Activities Board (SAB) is an executive organization that attempts to help students engage with popular culture by bringing different concerts, films, and other forms of entertainment to campus. Messiah University has, through SAB, hosted such musicians and bands as Bob Dylan, Counting Crows, Katy Perry, Chiddy Bang, Fun., Jack's Mannequin, Ingrid Michaelson, Mat Kearney, Owl City, Brand New, Guster, Janelle Monáe, Conor Oberst and the Mystic Valley Band, Anberlin, Nickel Creek, White Rabbits, The Decemberists, Regina Spektor, Iron & Wine, M. Ward, The Low Anthem, Mates of State, Exit Clov, Feist, Wilco, Rosie Thomas, Copeland, mewithoutYou, Phantom Planet, Erin McKeown, Rilo Kiley, 4th Avenue Jones, Lifehouse, Jon Bellion, Johnnyswim, Jason Mraz, Josh Ritter, Magic, 21 Pilots, Colony House, Smallpools, NF, Lecrae, Ben Rector, and VERITE, and as well as Christian artists Needtobreathe, Andy Mineo, Relient K, Jeff Deyo, August Burns Red, Jars of Clay, Cross Movement, Matt Wertz and Out of Eden, among others. They also plan dances, coffeehouses, cultural engagement and other activities like outings, Broadway trips, and festivals for students. SAB hosts a free concert series throughout the semester, held in the Larsen Student Union building. Local, indie and up-and-coming bands and artists play throughout the school year. These concerts are free to students and the general public.

== Traditions ==
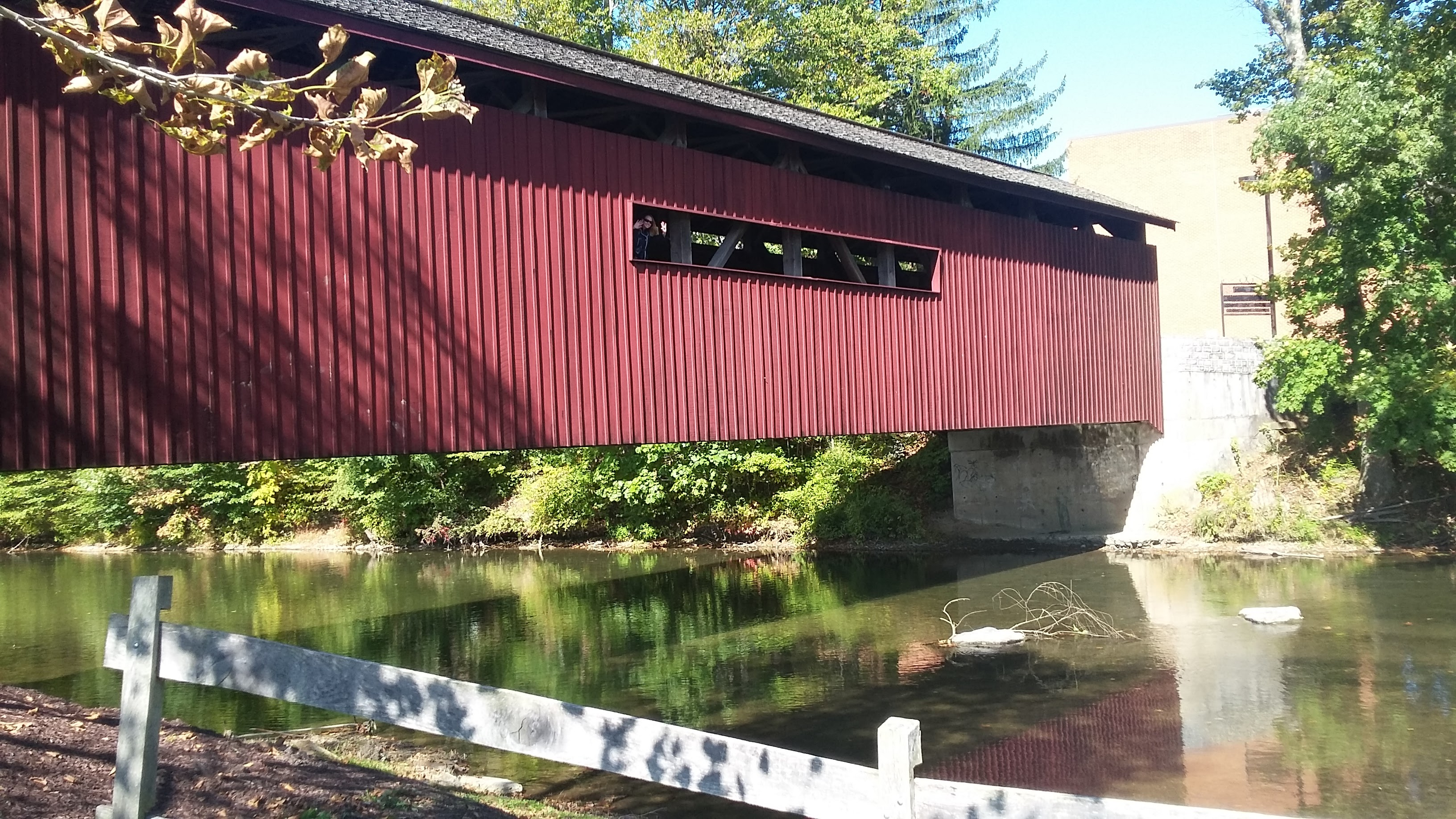
Covered bridge over the Yellow Breeches Creek, where the "creeking" tradition occurs

- White-Out March during homecoming
- Midnight Scream during Finals week
- Candlelight service for new students and their parents before the start of the Fall semester
- "Creeking": This tradition started out as a way of congratulating male students who had recently gotten engaged. The student would be taken to the nearby Yellow Breeches Creek by his friends and thrown in. It is also common for people to be "creeked" on their birthdays. The tradition has been extended to the female population.
- Pancake night in Lottie Nelson Dining Hall
- Service Day: In April, the University sponsors a day of service in which faculty, staff, administration, and students serve in campus and local community service projects.
- Tubing in the Yellow Breeches Creek

== Demographics ==
Messiah College CDP, Pennsylvania
- Census-designated place
- Location within Pennsylvania
- Coordinates: 40°09′27″N 76°59′03″W
- Country: United States
- State: Pennsylvania
- County: Cumberland
- Township: Upper Allen

Area
  - Total: 0.34 sq mi (0.87 km^{2})
  - Land: 0.32 sq mi (0.83 km^{2})
  - Water: 0.015 sq mi (0.04 km^{2})
- Elevation: 479 ft (146 m)

Population (2020)
  - Total: 2,841
  - Density: 8,900/sq mi (3,400/km^{2})
- Time zone: UTC-5 (Eastern (EST))
  - Summer (DST): UTC-4 (EDT)
- FIPS code: 42-48868
- GNIS feature ID: 2633703

Messiah College CDP is a census-designated place located in Upper Allen Township, Cumberland County, in the state of Pennsylvania. It is located near Grantham and consists of the campus of Messiah University. It was first listed as a CDP in 2010. Per the 2020 census, the population was 2,841.

The school district covering the CDP is Mechanicsburg Area School District.

Historical population
Census	Pop.	Note	%±
2010	2,215		—
2020	2,841		28.3%
U.S. Decennial Census; 2010 2020

=== 2020 census ===
Messiah College CDP, Pennsylvania - Demographic Profile (NH = Non-Hispanic) Note: the US Census treats Hispanic/Latino as an ethnic category. This table excludes Latinos from the racial categories and assigns them to a separate category. Hispanics/Latinos may be of any race.
Race / Ethnicity	Pop 2010	Pop 2020	% 2010	% 2020
White alone (NH)	2,015	1,962	90.97%	69.06%
Black or African American alone (NH)	49	168	2.21%	5.91%
Native American or Alaska Native alone (NH)	2	1	0.09%	0.04%
Asian alone (NH)	56	355	2.53%	12.50%
Pacific Islander alone (NH)	0	0	0.00%	0.00%
Some Other Race alone (NH)	2	1	0.09%	0.04%
Mixed Race/Multi-Racial (NH)	27	133	1.22%	4.68%
Hispanic or Latino (any race)	64	221	2.89%	7.78%
Total	2,215	2,841	100.00%	100.00%

== Athletics ==
Messiah athletics wordmark

The Messiah University Falcons compete in NCAA Division III athletics with 22 intercollegiate athletic teams. Messiah is a member of the Middle Atlantic Conferences. The Messiah University mascot is the Falcon, which was given the name Fandango in 2006. Through the Senior Class Gift from the Class of 2017, the mascot changed his look and was renamed to Flex. Their local rival is Elizabethtown College.

Messiah's men's and women's soccer teams both won the NCAA Division III National Championship in 2005, 2008, 2009 and 2012. The Falcons men's soccer team are eleven-time national champions, winning the NCAA Men's Division III Soccer Championship in 2000, 2002, 2004, 2005, 2006, 2008, 2009, 2010, 2012, 2013 and 2017. Messiah's women's soccer team has won the NCAA Division III Women's Soccer Championship in 2005, 2008, 2009, 2011, 2012, and 2019. Messiah University is the only college in the NCAA to win both the men's and women's soccer national championship in the same year, and they have achieved that distinction four times (in 2005, 2008, 2009 and 2012). The men's and women's track & field teams have won 11 individual NCAA Division III National Championships. In 2010, Messiah was ranked by U.S. News & World Report as the third best school in the nation for soccer fans.

The women's softball team won their first NCAA Division III national championship in 2009.

The women's field hockey team won their first NCAA Division III National Championship in 2016.

The men's wrestling team has won five individual NCAA Division III National Championships. The team finished as the national runner-up in 2016.

In 2017 Tim Moses became the first-ever NCAA Division III men's pole vaulter to earn All-American honors in every indoor and outdoor season (eight total).

== Notable people ==
=== Alumni ===
- Vanessa Alfano (1999), founder of healthystyleny.com and former American weather anchor for WWOR-TV in New York City
- Jonathan Bean (2003), author and illustrator of children's books
- Ernest Boyer (did not graduate; transferred out), Chancellor of the State University of New York, U.S. Commissioner of Education, and President of the Carnegie Foundation for the Advancement of Teaching
- Chris Boyles (2002), decathlete
- Dave Brandt (1985), professional soccer coach
- Lynn H. Cohick (1984), New Testament scholar and provost at Northern Seminary
- Ray Crist (1916), chemist who participated in the Manhattan Project
- Nate Davidson (2011), Member of the Pennsylvania House of Representatives from the 103rd district
- Brian Duffield (2008), filmmaker
- Peter Enns (1982), Biblical scholar, theologian, and writer
- Monica Goodling (1995), U.S. government lawyer and George W. Bush administration political appointee
- Peter Greer (1997), anti-poverty advocate, author, and president and CEO of Hope International (Christian microfinance)
- Chris Heisey (attended 2003–2006, did not graduate), Major League Baseball player
- Derreck Kayongo (1995), CEO of the National Center for Civil and Human Rights
- Levi Landis (2003), curator, musician, festival producer, and CEO of GoggleWorks Center for the Arts.
- Brian Sell (did not graduate; transferred out), long-distance runner
- Jay Smith, Christian apologist
- David J. Steinberg (1986), late actor
- Gregory Alan Thornbury (1993), president of The King's College
- Steve Thurston (1998), journalist, entrepreneur, and CEO of Integrity Ministries (Integridad Network, Inc.)
- LeRoy Walters (1962), bioethicist and Christian ethicist at the Kennedy Institute of Ethics

=== Faculty ===
- Robin Collins, American philosopher
- Douglas Jacobsen, religious studies scholar and author, professor emeritus
- Donald Kraybill, former Provost of Messiah College and former professor at Elizabethtown College
- Ron Sider, theologian and social activist, professor emeritus
