= New Cumberland, Pennsylvania =

Borough in Pennsylvania, US

- Borough
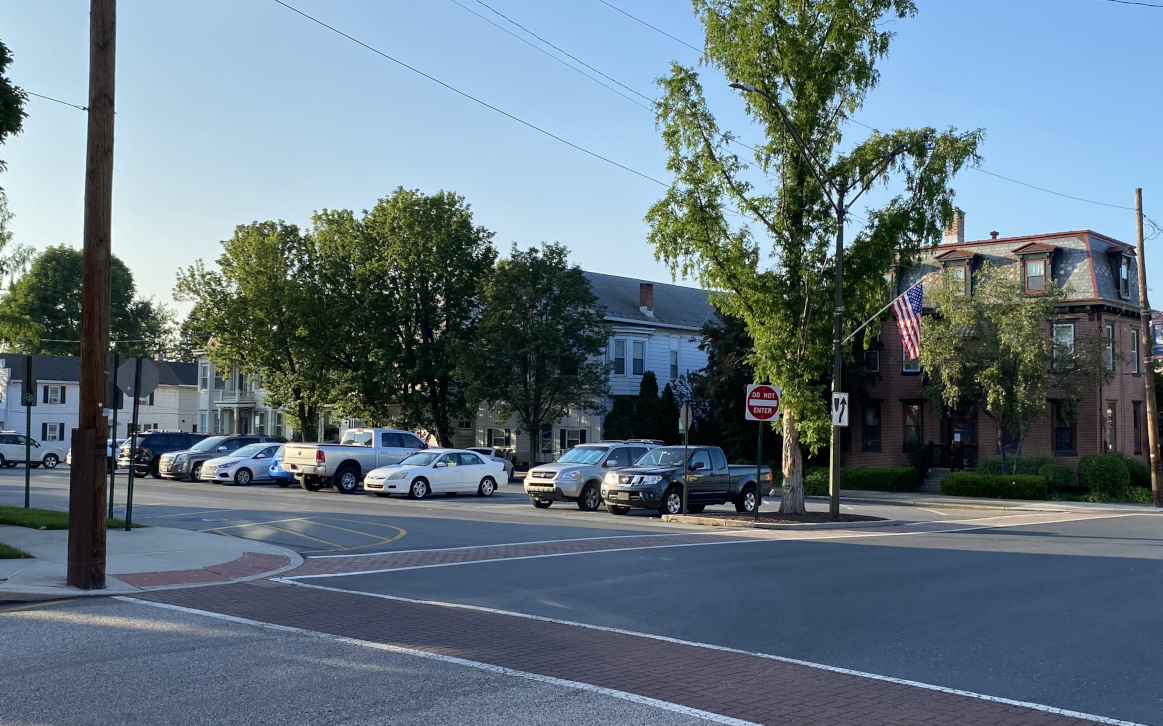
- 3rd & Market Streets in New Cumberland

- Location of New Cumberland in Cumberland County, Pennsylvania.

- Location in Pennsylvania and the United States New Cumberland (the United States)
- Coordinates: 40°13′45″N 76°52′26″W
- Country: United States
- State: Pennsylvania
- County: Cumberland

Government
  - Type: Borough Council
  - Mayor: Joan Erney
  - Borough Manager: Nathaniel Dysard
  - Council President: David H. Stone
  - Council Vice President: Gennifer R. Richie
  - Council Member: List of Council Members: Fred Miles; Drew Lawrence; Gibby Parthemore; Mary Baker; Robert Hasemeier

Area
  - Total: 1.68 sq mi (4.36 km^{2})
  - Land: 1.68 sq mi (4.34 km^{2})
  - Water: 0.012 sq mi (0.03 km^{2})
- Elevation: 364 ft (111 m)

Population (2020)
  - Total: 7,507
  - Density: 4,482.7/sq mi (1,730.79/km^{2})
- Time zone: UTC-5 (Eastern (EST))
  - Summer (DST): UTC-4 (EDT)
- ZIP code: 17070
- Area codes: 717 and 223
- FIPS code: 42-53464
- Website: newcumberlandborough.com

New Cumberland is a borough in the easternmost region of Cumberland County, Pennsylvania, United States. New Cumberland was incorporated on March 21, 1831. The population was 7,507 at the 2020 census. The borough is noted for its historic downtown which includes landmarks like the historic West Shore Theater, Borough Park and the yearly Apple Festival, which gathers hundreds of vendors and thousands of visitors.

New Cumberland is part of the Harrisburg–Carlisle metropolitan statistical area.

== History ==
New Cumberland has had many names — Shawneetown, Chartiers Landing, Lowther Manor, Haldeman’s Town, and Cumberland — before being officially named “New Cumberland” in 1827 and incorporated as a borough in 1831. Early on, the river and creek provided a harbor for lumber rafting, leading to sawmills, a grain mill, and a depot that turned the town into a shipping point for lumber, grain and iron to larger cities. By 1845 it had a small but growing community of over 300 people, stores, mills, and a tavern. After the Civil War lumber dwindled, but the town diversified with woolen mills, nail and carpet factories and retail shops. In the 20th century New Cumberland transformed from an industrial town to a suburban borough — expanding its area, building infrastructure like paved streets, sewage, schools, churches, and services, while maintaining small-town character with civic organizations, a library, a park where mills once stood, a town band and festivals that preserved a sense of community.

== Geography ==
New Cumberland is located at 40°13′45″N 76°52′26″W (40.229140, -76.873992) and borders the western bank of the Susquehanna River in South Central Pennsylvania. It is bordered to the south by Yellow Breeches Creek, across which is York County and the Capital City Airport. To the west is Lower Allen Township, and to the north is the borough of Lemoyne. New Cumberland is situated along the southern edge of the Cumberland Valley.

Interstate 83 follows part of the western border of the borough, with access from Exit 40B (Simpson Ferry Road).

The William Black Homestead is located in New Cumberland and is listed on the National Register of Historic Places.

According to the United States Census Bureau, the borough has a total area of 1.68 square miles (4.36 km^{2}), of which 1.68 square miles (4.34 km^{2}) is land and 0.01 square miles (0.03 km^{2}), or 0.62%, is water.

== Demographics ==
Historical population
Census	Pop.	Note	%±
1840	284		—
1850	315		10.9%
1860	394		25.1%
1870	515		30.7%
1880	569		10.5%
1890	754		32.5%
1900	1,035		37.3%
1910	1,472		42.2%
1920	1,577		7.1%
1930	4,283		171.6%
1940	4,525		5.7%
1950	6,204		37.1%
1960	9,257		49.2%
1970	9,803		5.9%
1980	8,051		−17.9%
1990	7,665		−4.8%
2000	7,349		−4.1%
2010	7,277		−1.0%
2020	7,507		3.2%

As of the census of 2000, there were 7,349 people, 3,301 households, and 2,016 families residing in the borough. The population density was 4,389.7 inhabitants per square mile (1,694.9/km^{2}). There were 3,417 housing units at an average density of 2,041.0 units per square mile (788.0 units/km^{2}). The racial makeup of the borough was 97.20% White, 0.64% African American, 0.10% Native American, 0.72% Asian, 0.05% Pacific Islander, 0.41% from other races, and 0.88% from two or more races. Hispanic or Latino of any race were 1.13% of the population.

There were 3,301 households, out of which 25.7% had children under the age of 18 living with them, 49.0% were married couples living together, 9.1% had a female householder with no husband present, and 38.9% were non-families. 33.0% of all households were made up of individuals, and 12.0% had someone living alone who was 65 years of age or older. The average household size was 2.22 and the average family size was 2.84.

In the borough the population was spread out, with 21.2% under the age of 18, 6.5% from 18 to 24, 30.1% from 25 to 44, 23.4% from 45 to 64, and 18.8% who were 65 years of age or older. The median age was 40 years. For every 100 females, there were 92.7 males. For every 100 females age 18 and over, there were 89.3 males.

The median income for a household in the borough was $44,783, and the median income for a family was $56,138. Males had a median income of $38,438 versus $27,964 for females. The per capita income for the borough was $24,672. About 2.6% of families and 3.6% of the population were below the poverty line, including 4.3% of those under age 18 and 2.7% of those age 65 or over.

== Notable people ==
- Patrick Fabian (born 1964), actor
- Stephen Zack (born 1992), basketball player
