= West Shore (Harrisburg) =

Region consisting of western suburbs of Harrisburg, Pennsylvania

Coordinates: 40.241°N 76.894°W

The West Shore of the Harrisburg area is a group of suburbs of Harrisburg, Pennsylvania which are located to the west of the Susquehanna River. The Susquehanna River is very wide near Harrisburg, and that contributes to the perception, at least among the local inhabitants, that the East Shore and West Shore have distinct identities. The West Shore area includes parts of eastern Cumberland County, southeastern Perry County and northern York County.

The Patriot-News has a West Shore edition for local news and the Pennsylvania Turnpike (Interstate 76) junction with Interstate 83 located just south of New Cumberland in Fairview Township, York County is named the Harrisburg West Shore Interchange. The West Shore Farmers Market is located in Lemoyne. The West Shore School District includes municipalities in Cumberland and York Counties.

== List of communities ==
The communities commonly considered on the West Shore include the following:

=== Cumberland County ===
Boroughs:

- Camp Hill
- Lemoyne
- Mechanicsburg
- New Cumberland
- Shiremanstown
- Wormleysburg

Townships:

- East Pennsboro
- Hampden
- Lower Allen
- Monroe
- Silver Spring
- Upper Allen

=== Perry County ===
Boroughs:

- Duncannon
- Marysville

Townships:

- Penn
- Rye

=== York County ===
Boroughs:

- Dillsburg
- Goldsboro
- Lewisberry
- York Haven

Townships:

- Carroll
- Fairview
- Monaghan
- Newberry

== Geography and climate ==
The West Shore's defining eastern boundary is the Susquehanna River, which separates it from Dauphin County. The three most prominent creeks from north to south are the Shermans Creek, Conodoguinet Creek, and the Yellow Breeches Creek. Each of these drains eastward into the Susquehanna. The county boundaries are natural in the region with Blue Mountain separating Cumberland and Perry Counties and the Yellow Breeches Creek separating Cumberland and York Counties. The climate borders between hot-summer humid continental (Dfa) and humid subtropical (Cfa,) with Cfa found in some lowlands of the Cumberland and York portions. The hardiness zone is 7a except for very small areas of 6b on Blue Mountain and on Perry County ridges at sufficient elevation and 7b along the Susquehanna in the York county portion.

Climate data for Harrisburg, Pennsylvania (Harrisburg Capital City Airport) 1991-2020 normals (Records 1939-2021)
Month	Jan	Feb	Mar	Apr	May	Jun	Jul	Aug	Sep	Oct	Nov	Dec	Year
Record high °F (°C)	73 (23)	83 (28)	86 (30)	93 (34)	97 (36)	100 (38)	107 (42)	101 (38)	102 (39)	97 (36)	84 (29)	75 (24)	107 (42)
Mean daily maximum °F (°C)	40.3 (4.6)	43.2 (6.2)	52.6 (11.4)	64.9 (18.3)	74.7 (23.7)	83.2 (28.4)	87.6 (30.9)	85.4 (29.7)	78.6 (25.9)	66.7 (19.3)	55.1 (12.8)	44.4 (6.9)	64.7 (18.2)
Daily mean °F (°C)	32.6 (0.3)	34.7 (1.5)	43.2 (6.2)	54.1 (12.3)	64.0 (17.8)	73.0 (22.8)	77.5 (25.3)	75.4 (24.1)	68.5 (20.3)	56.7 (13.7)	46.0 (7.8)	37.0 (2.8)	55.2 (12.9)
Mean daily minimum °F (°C)	24.9 (−3.9)	26.2 (−3.2)	33.9 (1.1)	43.3 (6.3)	53.2 (11.8)	62.8 (17.1)	67.4 (19.7)	65.5 (18.6)	58.4 (14.7)	46.7 (8.2)	37.0 (2.8)	29.5 (−1.4)	45.7 (7.6)
Record low °F (°C)	−9 (−23)	−5 (−21)	2 (−17)	19 (−7)	31 (−1)	40 (4)	49 (9)	45 (7)	30 (−1)	23 (−5)	13 (−11)	−8 (−22)	−9 (−23)
Average precipitation inches (mm)	2.64 (67)	2.36 (60)	3.35 (85)	3.70 (94)	3.48 (88)	3.72 (94)	4.30 (109)	3.68 (93)	4.12 (105)	3.68 (93)	2.80 (71)	3.15 (80)	40.98 (1,041)
Average precipitation days (≥ 0.01 in)	9	9	10	12	14	12	12	11	10	11	9	10	127
Source: NOAA

== Recreation ==
A significant portion of the recreation opportunities of the Capital Region are located on the West Shore. The Appalachian Trail passes through the Perry County portion. The area also hosts the Capital City Mall and the Williams Grove Speedway in the Cumberland portion.

== Economy ==
Being served by Interstates 76, 81, and 83 and the 581 expressway, the West Shore hosts a number of large employers and a significant amount of Class A office space. Rite Aid Corporation is a major drugstore chain with a major office (formerly the longtime headquarters) in East Pennsboro Township. The US military maintains a strong presence in the Capital Region as an employer, and this includes two facilities on the West Shore: New Cumberland Defense Depot in Fairview Township and Naval Support Activity Mechanicsburg in Hampden Township. Such an ample presence of employers in the area helps keep unemployment consistently lower than the state average and helped make Cumberland County the fastest-growing Pennsylvania county in the past decade according to the 2020 census.

== Colleges ==
- Central Penn College, Summerdale
- Messiah University, Grantham
