= Lower Allen, Pennsylvania =

Unincorporated community in Pennsylvania, US

- Census-designated place
- Location within the U.S. state of Pennsylvania Lower Allen (the United States)
- Coordinates: 40°13′41″N 76°54′8″W
- Country: United States
- State: Pennsylvania
- County: Cumberland
- Township: Lower Allen

Area
  - Total: 2.23 sq mi (5.78 km^{2})
  - Land: 2.20 sq mi (5.69 km^{2})
  - Water: 0.035 sq mi (0.09 km^{2})
- Elevation: 390 ft (120 m)

Population (2020)
  - Total: 7,465
  - Density: 3,397.9/sq mi (1,311.95/km^{2})
- Time zone: UTC-5 (Eastern (EST))
  - Summer (DST): UTC-4 (EDT)
- FIPS code: 42-44824
- GNIS feature ID: 1867496

Lower Allen is a census-designated place (CDP) in Lower Allen Township in Cumberland County, Pennsylvania, United States. The population was 6,694 at the 2010 census. It is part of the Harrisburg–Carlisle metropolitan statistical area.

== Geography ==
Lower Allen is located in eastern Cumberland County, occupying the northeastern corner of Lower Allen Township at 40°13′41″N 76°54′8″W (40.227990, -76.902305). The CDP consists of several suburban neighborhoods in the Harrisburg area, including White Hill, Highland Park, Eberlys Mill, Cedar Cliff, and Allendale. Neighboring communities are the boroughs of Camp Hill and Lemoyne to the north and the borough of New Cumberland to the east. The remainder of Lower Allen Township is to the west and southwest. Yellow Breeches Creek forms part of the southern boundary of the CDP, across which is Fairview Township in York County.

Interstate 83 runs along the eastern edge of Lower Allen, with access from Exits 40B and 41A. The Harrisburg Capital Beltway (Pennsylvania Route 581) runs along the northern edge of the CDP. U.S. Route 15 forms the western extent of the CDP, with the nearest access from Lower Allen Drive at the Capital City Mall, just outside the CDP's limit.According to the U.S. Census Bureau, Lower Allen has a total area of 2.2 square miles (5.8 km^{2}), of which 2.2 square miles (5.7 km^{2}) is land and 0.04 square miles (0.1 km^{2}), or 1.51%, is water.

== Demographics ==
Historical population
Census	Pop.	Note	%±
2020	7,465		—
U.S. Decennial Census

As of the 2000 census, there were 6,619 people, 3,031 households, and 1,851 families residing in the CDP. The population density was 2,827.7 inhabitants per square mile (1,091.8/km^{2}). There were 3,131 housing units at an average density of 1,337.6 per square mile (516.5/km^{2}). The racial makeup of the CDP was 94.32% White, 2.55% African American, 0.06% Native American, 1.89% Asian, 0.02% Pacific Islander, 0.47% from other races, and 0.69% from two or more races. Hispanic or Latino of any race were 1.69% of the population.

There were 3,031 households, out of which 24.2% had children under the age of 18 living with them, 50.0% were married couples living together, 9.3% had a female householder with no husband present, and 38.9% were non-families. 34.5% of all households were made up of individuals, and 18.2% had someone living alone who was 65 years of age or older. The average household size was 2.13 and the average family size was 2.73.

In the CDP, the population was spread out, with 19.3% under the age of 18, 5.1% from 18 to 24, 26.6% from 25 to 44, 24.7% from 45 to 64, and 24.3% who were 65 years of age or older. The median age was 44 years. For every 100 females, there were 81.4 males. For every 100 females age 18 and over, there were 76.2 males.

The median income for a household in the CDP was $50,379, and the median income for a family was $61,964. Males had a median income of $40,237 versus $30,669 for females. The per capita income for the CDP was $27,956. About 6.8% of families and 7.7% of the population were below the poverty line, including 12.3% of those under age 18 and 3.8% of those age 65 or over.

== Education ==
The school district is West Shore School District.

== Notable people ==
- George K. James, former Cornell University head football coach
