= Ashton-Hursh House =

Historic house in Pennsylvania, United States

- U.S. National Register of Historic Places
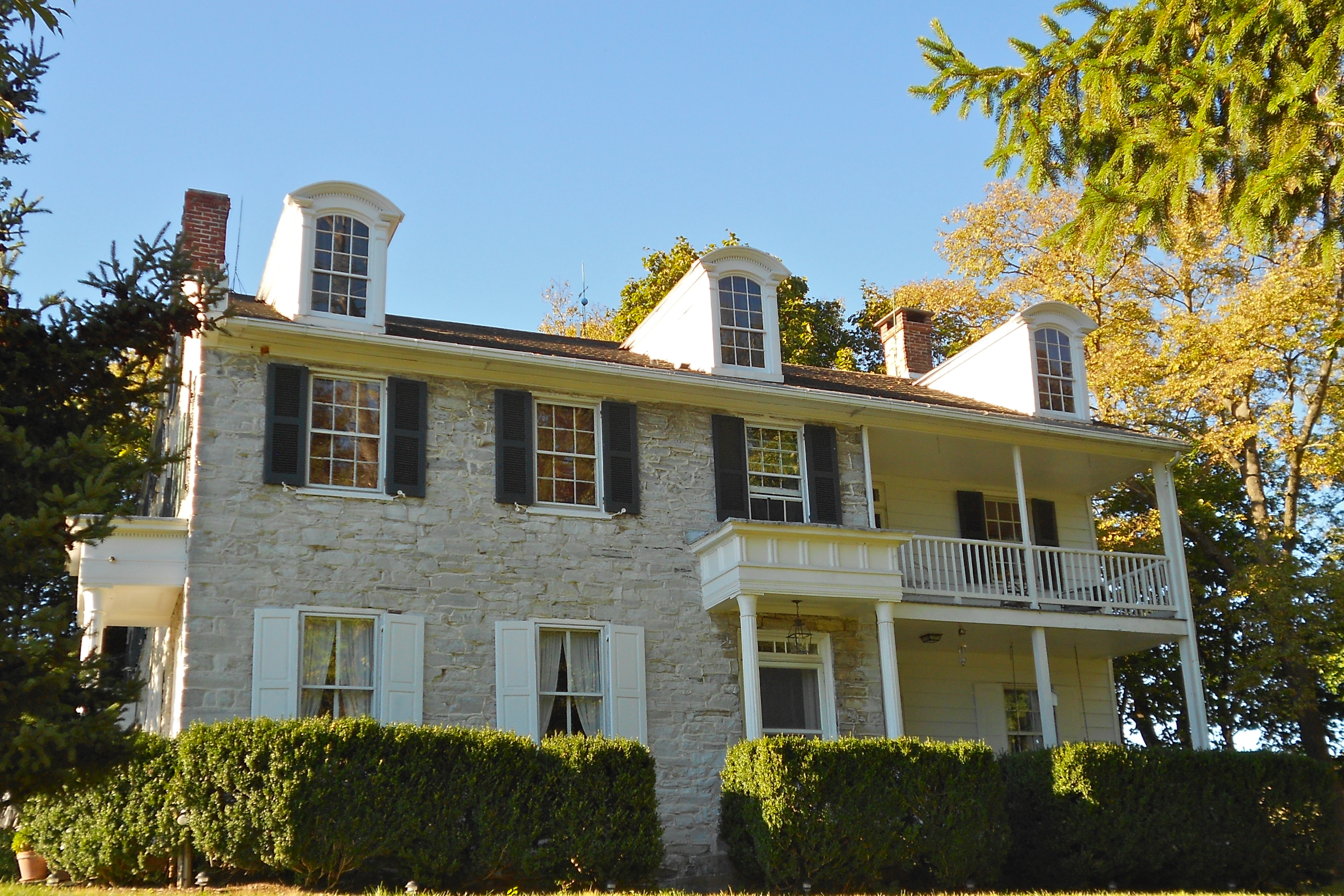
- Ashton-Hursh House, 2013

- Location within Pennsylvania Location within the United States
- Location: 204 Limekiln Road, south of New Cumberland, Fairview Township, Pennsylvania
- Coordinates: 40°13′1″N 76°52′23″W
- Area: 2.5 acres (1.0 ha)
- Built: c. 1830
- Architectural style: Federal, Greek Revival
- NRHP reference No.: 03001155
- Added to NRHP: November 15, 2003

The Ashton-Hursh House is a historic home and outbuilding located at 204 Limekiln Road in Fairview Township, York County, Pennsylvania. Built in stages between approximately 1764 and 1830, it is a 2 1/2-story, L-shaped, Federal style log, frame, and stone dwelling. Situated on a limestone foundation, the home also has a gable roof and three Greek Revival-style porticos. The frame outbuilding may date as early as 1734; it was renovated circa 1830. The outbuilding is believed by historians to be York County's oldest occupied structure.

This property was added to the National Register of Historic Places in 2003.

== History ==
According to architectural historian B. Raid, who prepared the nomination form to secure the placement of this property on the National Register of Historic Places, Samuel Blunston was commissioned by the family of William Penn to begin issuing licenses for land which had been owned by Penn and his family in what are, today, Cumberland and York counties; the first forty-nine were obtained by men hoping to settle in Cumberland County in 1733 while the fiftieth ("the very first to be issued for land in York County") was awarded to "Richard Ashton, a fur trader, who named his limestone-rich tract of land 'Fortune'" that same year. Sometime after the death of Ashton and his wife (prior to 1761), "the 359-acre property located on the south side of the Yellow Breeches Creek" was transferred to their children William and Sarah, who then sold her half of the property to William, who then sold the entire property to Peter Hursh in November 1788.

=== Placement of the property on the National Register of Historic Places ===
Pennsylvania's Historic Preservation Board reviewed the nomination of the Ashton-Hursh House for Placement on the National Register of Historic Places at the board's meeting on September 9, 2003, at 9:45 a.m. in Room 515 of the Pennsylvania Historical and Museum Commission at Third and North Streets in Harrisburg, Pennsylvania. Among the other nominations reviewed at this same meeting were those of the: Narbrook Park Historic District in Montgomery County, Fricks Locks Historic District and St. Peters Village Historic District in Chester County, Upper Roxborough Historic District (boundary increase) in Philadelphia, and the Franklin and Marshall College Campus Historic District in Lancaster.

The Ashton-Hursh House was then approved for addition to the National Register of Historic Places in 2003.

== Architectural features ==
Built in the Federal style of architecture in stages on a limestone foundation between roughly 1764 and 1830, the Ashton-Hursh House is a 2 1/2-story, L-shaped, log, frame, and stone dwelling with a gable roof and three Greek Revival-style porticos. The frame outbuilding, which is thought to be the oldest occupied structure in York County, Pennsylvania, was likely built sometime around 1734; it was then renovated circa 1830.
