= Helen Waddell (baseball) =

American baseball player (1930–2025)

Helen "Sis" Waddell-Wyatt (April 24, 1930 – November 11, 2025) was an American baseball player who competed in the All-American Girls Professional Baseball League (AAGPBL) from 1949 to 1951. She both threw and batted right-handed in outfield, and utility infield positions.

== Early life ==
Waddell was born in Lemoyne, Pennsylvania, on April 24, 1930. She had five older brothers, who she claimed, "beat the hell out of [her]," toughening her up which helped her with her baseball.

== Baseball career ==
After trying out for the AAGPBL in 1949, she was assigned to spring training for the South Bend Blue Sox. She never played for South Bend, being traded to the Rockford Peaches just before the start of the 1950 season. Waddell played with the Springfield Sallies (1949), the Rockford Peaches (1950, 1951) and the Battle Creek Belles (1951). When she played for the Rockford Peaches, the team was managed by Bill Allington. She played second base for the Peaches when they won the All-American Girls Professional Baseball title in 1951.

== Personal life and death ==
Waddell married Neil Wyatt in 1951. They were married for 53 years and had two sons. She died on November 11, 2025, at the age of 95.

== Career statistics ==
Year	G	AB	R	H	2B	3B	HR	RBI	SB	BB	SO	AVG
1949	-	-	-	-	-	-	-	-	-	-	-	-
1950	54	149	11	14	3	0	0	12	3	17	37	.094
1951	60	217	25	32	2	0	0	17	6	24	36	.147
