= West Shore School District =

School district in Pennsylvania

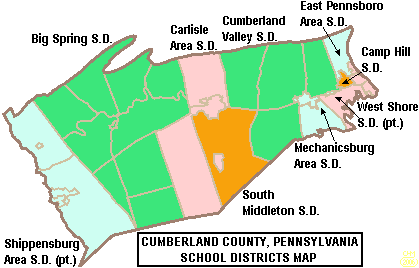

Address
- 507 Fishing Creek Road New Cumberland, Cumberland County and York County, Pennsylvania, 17070-9517; United States

District information
- Type: Public
- Grades: K-12
- Established: 1966
- Schools: 14

Students and staff
- District mascot: Red Land Patriots; Cedar Cliff Colts; Allen Mustangs; Crossroads Patriots (formerly Thunder); New Cumberland Tigers; Fairview Colts (formerly Panthers); Old Trail Patriots; Hillside Hedgehogs; Highland Stallions; Washington Heights Eagles; Rossmoyne Bulldogs; Red Mill Dolphins; Newberry Bobcats; Fishing Creek Sharks
- Colors: Blue and Gold (Cedar Cliff), Red and Blue (Red Land)

Other information
- Website: www.wssd.k12.pa.us

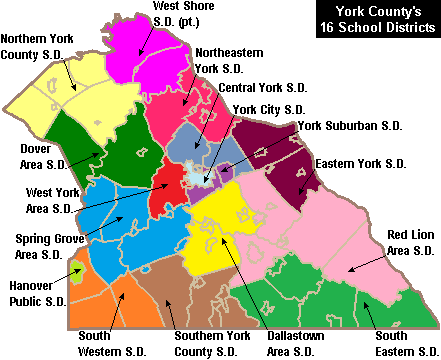
West Shore School District region in York County

West Shore School District, is a large, suburban, public school district with its main office located in Lewisberry, Pennsylvania. This district serves students in eastern Cumberland County and northern York County. It serves the municipalities of Lemoyne, New Cumberland and Wormleysburg boroughs and Lower Allen Township in Cumberland County; Goldsboro and Lewisberry boroughs, Fairview Township and Newberry Township in York County. It includes the Lower Allen census-designated place. West Shore School District encompasses approximately 78 square miles (200 km^{2}). According to 2000 federal census data, the district served a resident population of 57,960 people. By 2010, the district's population increased to 62,514 people.

According to the Pennsylvania Budget and Policy Center, 26 of the district's pupils lived at 185% or below the Federal Poverty Level as shown by their eligibility for the federal free or reduced price school meal programs in 2012. In 2009, the District residents' per capita income was $24,740, while the median family income was $57,500. In the Commonwealth, the median family income was $49,501 and the United States median family income was $49,445, in 2010. In York County, the median household income was $57,494. By 2013, the median household income in the United States rose to $52,100.

Based on enrollment, the school district is the largest serving Cumberland County and one of the largest in the greater Harrisburg metropolitan area. It was formed in 1966 from four small Cumberland County districts and one school district in York County. About 58 percent of the district's students come from York County, with the remaining 42 percent coming from Cumberland County. Eighty percent of the district's area resides in York County.

West Shore School District operates two high schools (grades 9–12). Most students from Cumberland County attend Cedar Cliff High School and most of the York County students attend Red Land High School. The district also operates three middle schools (grades 6–8 previously, 7-8 as of 2024), 2 intermediate schools (grades 5-6, opened in 2024), and 7 elementary schools (grades K-5 previously, grades k-4 as of 2024).

== Schools ==
- Cedar Cliff High School Principal: Jennifer Post
- Red Land High School Principal: Melissa Herbert
- Allen Middle School Principal: Tamira Howard
- New Cumberland Middle School Principal: Tamira Howard
- Crossroads Middle School Principal: Tracy Dominick
- Fairview Intermediate Principal: Tyler Gensler
- Old Trail Intermediate Principal: Dr. Michelle Trevino
- Washington Heights Elementary School Principal: Travis Peck
- Red Mill Elementary School Principal: Adam Marshall
- Newberry Elementary School Principal: Shelly McGowan, recent Interim Principal: Kathryn England
- Rossmoyne Elementary School Principal: Christopher Stine
- Hillside Elementary School Principal: Julie Dougherty
- Highland Elementary School Principal: Kevin Scharlau
- Fishing Creek Elementary School Principal: Matthew Wensel

Herman Avenue and Washington Heights were sister schools up until 2000, when Herman Avenue closed; Herman Avenue was grades k-2, and Washington Heights was grades 3-5. Washington Heights is now k-4, since its rebuild in 1999. Lower Allen and Rossmoyne Elementary Schools were sister schools, however, Lower Allen closed in 2021, and Rossmoyne is now k–4. Mount Zion and Fairview Elementary Schools once were sister schools, until Mount Zion closed in 2012. Fairview Elementary School became k-5 upon Mount Zion’s closure, but was replaced by Fairview Intermediate in 2024, which is 5-6. Allen Middle is temporarily closed for renovation, as West Shore School District will be expanding the building, to allow for the future closure of New Cumberland Middle School. Seventh graders were sent to New Cumberland Middle School, and eighth graders were sent to a designated section of Cedar Cliff High School, called Allen Academy. Allen Middle School is expected to reopen at the beginning of the 2028-2029 school year.

== Extracurriculars ==
West Shore School District offers a variety of clubs, activities and an extensive sports program.

=== Sports ===
The District funds:

Cedar Cliff High School

Boys

- Baseball – AAAA
- Basketball – AAAA
- Cross Country – AAA
- Football – AAAA
- Golf – AAA
- Soccer – AAA
- Swimming and Diving – AAA
- Tennis – AAA
- Track and Field – AAA
- Volleyball – AAA
- Wrestling – AAA
- Marching Band – Tournament of Bands Chapter VI and USBands (Offered to 8th graders as well)

Girls

- Basketball – AAAA
- Cross Country – Class AAA
- Field Hockey – AAA
- Golf – AAA
- Soccer (Fall) – AAA
- Softball – AAAA
- Swimming and Diving – AAA
- Girls' Tennis – AAA
- Track and Field – AAA
- Volleyball – AAA
- Marching Band – Tournament of Bands Chapter VI and USBands (Offered To 8th graders as well)

Red Land High School

Boys

- Baseball – AAAA
- Basketball – AAAA
- Cross Country- AAA
- Football – AAA
- Golf – AAA
- Soccer – AAA
- Swimming and Diving – AAA
- Tennis – AAA
- Track and Field – AAA
- Volleyball – AA
- Wrestling – AAA
- Marching Band – Tournament of Bands Chapter VI and USBands (Offered to 8th graders as well)

Girls

- Basketball – AAAA
- Cross Country – AAA
- Field Hockey – AAA
- Golf – AAA
- Soccer (Fall) – AAA
- Softball – AAAA
- Swimming and Diving – AAA
- Girls' Tennis – AAA
- Track and Field – AAA
- Volleyball – AAA
- Marching Band – Tournament of Bands Chapter VI and USBands (Offered to 8th graders as well)

Middle Schools:

Boys

- Basketball
- Cross Country
- Football
- Soccer
- Track and Field
- Wrestling
- Marching Band- (Offered to 8th graders only)

Girls

- Basketball
- Cross Country
- Field Hockey
- Track and Field
- Softball
- Marching Band (Offered to 8th graders only)

According to PIAA directory July 2012

On March 19, 2015, the West Shore School District school board voted 6–2 to combine the Cedar Cliff and Red Land marching bands, to form West Shore Marching Band. It is under the direction of Robert Starrett (band director at Red Land) and George Clements (band director at Cedar Cliff High School).

== Closed Schools ==
=== Cedar Run Elementary School ===
Cedar Run was closed in 1984 but was leased to the Capital Area Intermediate Unit until 2009. The district had considered turning the former elementary school into a school for at-risk and gifted students who need specialized study. https://www.pennlive.com/midstate/2012/04/west_shore_school_district_sel.html

=== Herman Avenue Elementary School ===
Herman Avenue and Washington Heights were sister schools up until 2000; Herman Avenue was grades k-2, and Washington Heights was grades 3-5. Washington Heights is now k-5, since its rebuild in 1999. Lemoyne Borough purchased the school on 11/27/2005 for $415,000 and after renovations, subsequently opened as the new Lemoyne Borough Office and West Shore Regional Police Department.

=== Mount Zion Elementary School ===
Mount Zion Elementary School was a grade k-2 school located in Lewisberry, Pennsylvania, Fairview Township. After completing second grade, students would continue to third grade at Fairview Elementary School.

In January 2012, the members of the school board proposed the closure of Mount Zion Elementary School, to help save the district's budget. In spring 2012, the final vote was made to close Mount Zion after the end of the school year. Since its close, the district temporarily placed its students and incoming students of that area to other elementary schools in the district, until expansions at Fairview Elementary School were complete. Fairview Elementary School served as a k-5 elementary school, but became an intermediate school for grades 5 and 6 in Fall 2024.

=== Lemoyne Middle School ===
The West Shore School Board voted unanimously to close Lemoyne Middle School in June 2013 to deal with budget constraints. The initial decision was to close either Lemoyne Middle School or New Cumberland Middle School. Students were reassigned to the remaining 3 middle schools in the district, and the eighth graders moved on to Cedar Cliff.

=== Lower Allen Elementary School ===
Lower Allen Elementary was a grade k-2 school located in Camp Hill, Pennsylvania, Lower Allen Township. After completing second grade, students would continue to Rossmoyne Elementary School.

Following the completion of the new Rossmoyne Elementary School build, Lower Allen Elementary closed in 2021. As of 2025, the building now houses Capital Area Intermediate Unit.

=== Fairview Elementary school ===
Fairview Elementary was a k-5 school located in Lewisberry, Pennsylvania, Fairview Township. In November 2022, the school district voted to close Fairview once the intermediate schools open in fall 2024 due to budget restraints. Fairview was later chosen to be the site of one of the new intermediate schools. Fairview Elementary remained open while its successor was being built, its last school year being the 2023-2024 school year. Fairview Intermediate School opened at the beginning of the 2024-2025 school year, and serves grades 5 and 6.
