= Cumberland County, Pennsylvania =

County in Pennsylvania, United States

- County
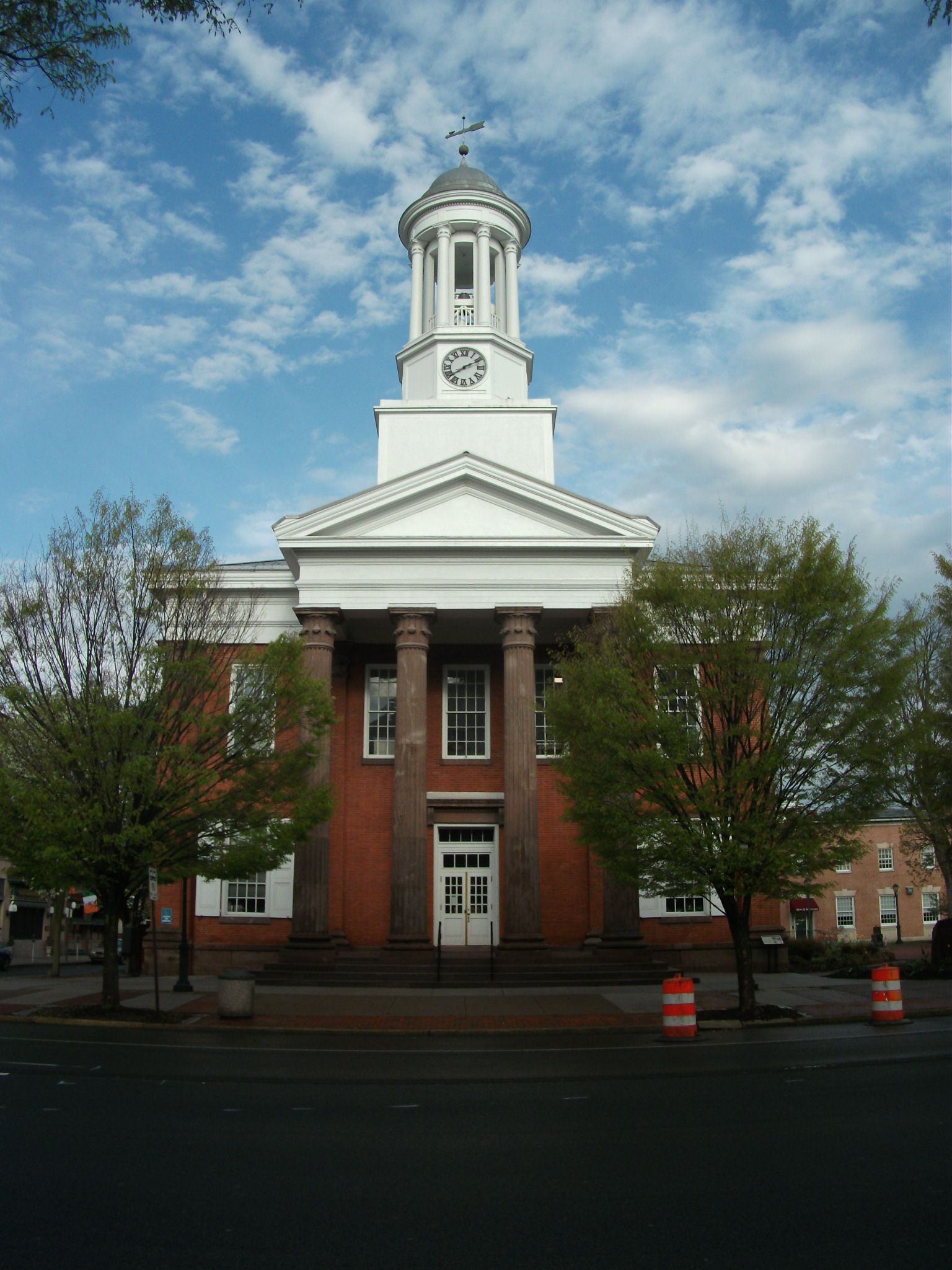
- Old Cumberland County Courthouse in Carlisle in April 2011

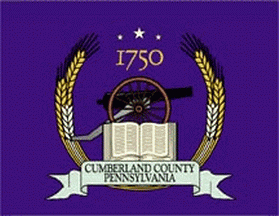
- Flag Seal

- Location within the U.S. state of Pennsylvania
- Coordinates: 40°10′N 77°16′W
- Country: United States
- State: Pennsylvania
- Founded: January 27, 1750
- Named for: Cumberland, England
- Seat: Carlisle
- Largest borough: Carlisle

Area
  - Total: 550 sq mi (1,400 km^{2})
  - Land: 545 sq mi (1,410 km^{2})
  - Water: 4.8 sq mi (12 km^{2}) 0.9%

Population (2020)
  - Total: 259,469
  - Estimate (2025): 277,270 ▲
  - Density: 476/sq mi (184/km^{2})
- Time zone: UTC−5 (Eastern)
  - Summer (DST): UTC−4 (EDT)
- Congressional districts: 10th, 13th
- Website: www.cumberlandcountypa.gov

Pennsylvania Historical Marker
- Designated: May 17, 1982

Cumberland County is a county in the Commonwealth of Pennsylvania. As of the 2020 census, the population was 259,469. Its county seat is Carlisle. Cumberland County is included in the Harrisburg–Carlisle metropolitan statistical area. The county is part of the South Central region of the commonwealth. (Note: Includes Lancaster, York, Berks, Dauphin, Cumberland, Franklin, Lebanon, Adams and Perry Counties)

== History ==
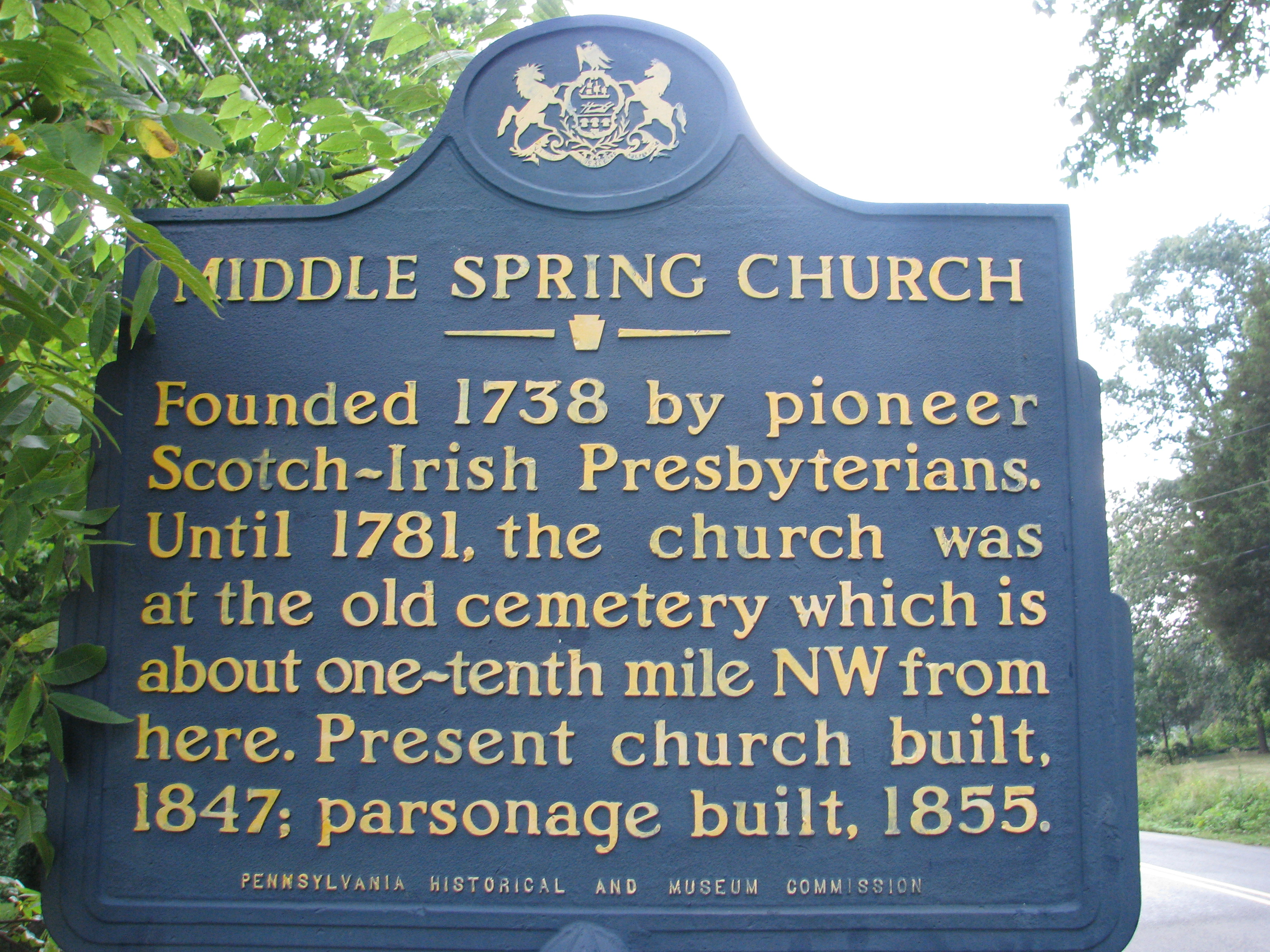
Plaque at Middle Spring Presbyterian Church

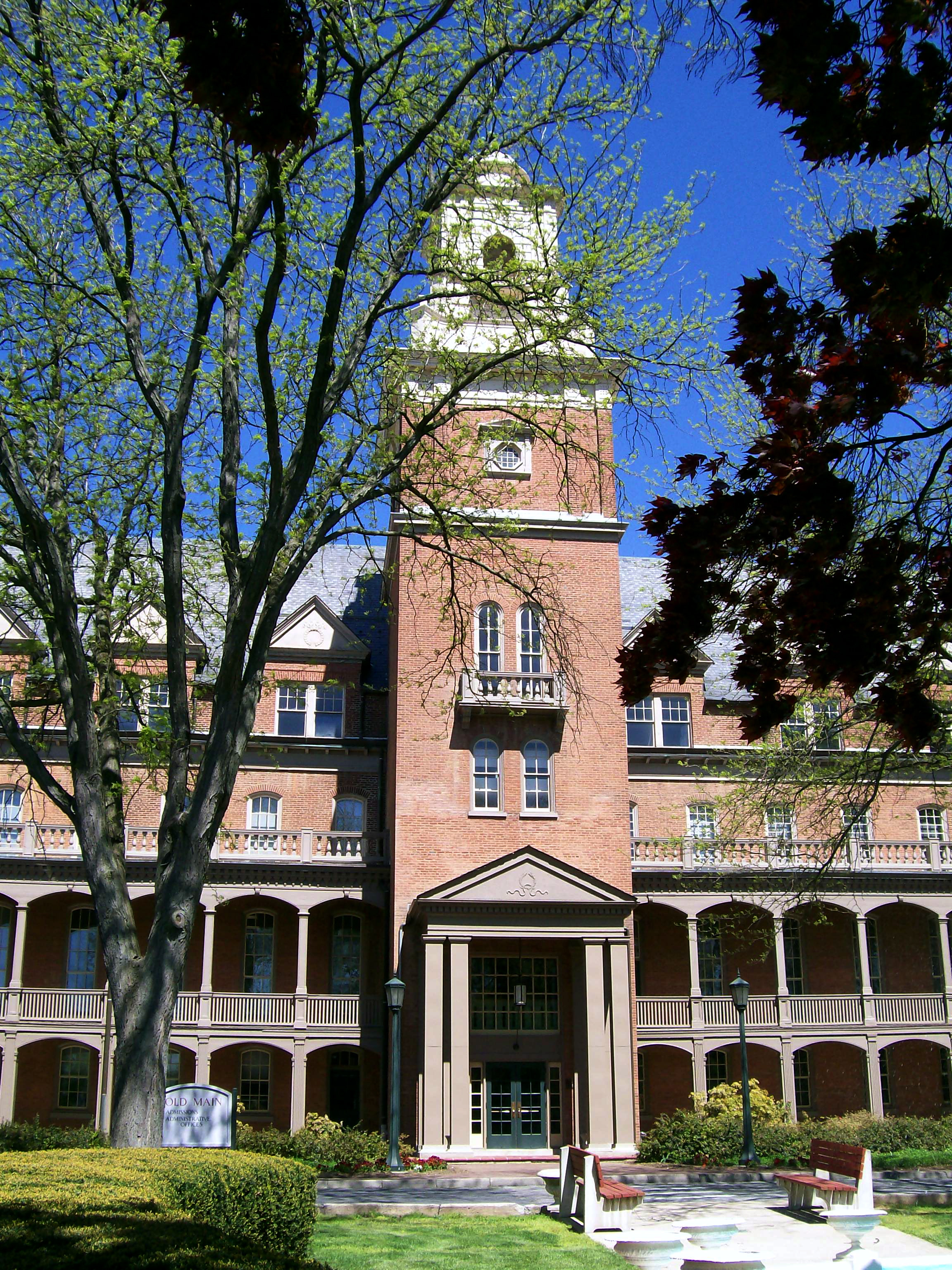
Old Main at Shippensburg University of Pennsylvania

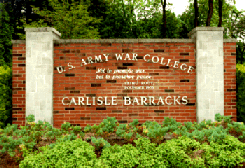
The U.S. Army War College

Cumberland County was first settled by a majority of Scots-Irish immigrants who arrived in approximately 1730. English and German settlers constituted about ten percent of the early population. The settlers originally mostly devoted the area to farming and later developed other trades. These settlers built the Middle Spring Presbyterian Church, among the oldest houses of worship in central Pennsylvania, in 1738 near present-day Shippensburg, Pennsylvania.

The General Assembly (legislature) of the Pennsylvania colony on January 27, 1750, created Cumberland County from Lancaster County, Pennsylvania, naming it for Cumberland, England. Its county seat is Carlisle. The county also lies within the Cumberland Valley adjoining the Susquehanna River at its eastern border, stretching approximately 42 miles from the borough of Shippensburg on the west to the Susquehanna River in east Cumberland County.

The oldest towns in the county are Shippensburg and Carlisle, each with its unique history. Shippensburg is home to Shippensburg University of Pennsylvania, one of 14 universities of the Pennsylvania State System of Higher Education. Carlisle is also home to Dickinson College, established in 1773, and the Penn State Dickinson School of Law.

The United States Army War College is a United States Army school located in Carlisle, Pennsylvania, on the 500 acres (2.0 km^{2}) campus of the historic Carlisle Barracks, a military post dating back to the 1770s. It caters to high-level military personnel and civilians and prepares them for strategic leadership responsibilities. It is the U. S. Army's most senior military educational institution.

During the Gettysburg campaign of the American Civil War in the summer of 1863, Confederate troops marched through the Cumberland Valley, briefly occupying much of the county.

In the 20th century, the suburbs of Harrisburg, the state capital, expanded extensively into eastern Cumberland County. Carlisle also developed suburbs in adjoining townships.

== Geography ==
According to the U.S. Census Bureau, the county has a total area of 550 square miles (1,400 km^{2}), of which 545 square miles (1,410 km^{2}) is land and 4.8 square miles (12 km^{2}) (0.9%) is water. The area code is 717 with an overlay of 223. Blue Mountain forms Cumberland's northern natural boundary and Yellow Breeches Creek forms part of its SE natural boundary. The Susquehanna River drains the county and forms its eastern natural boundary. A large portion of Cumberland is drained by the Conodoguinet Creek, which winds its way west-to-east across the county into the Susquehanna.

=== Climate ===
Almost all of Cumberland has a hot-summer humid continental climate (Dfa) and its hardiness zone is 7a, except in small higher areas near the NW and SW boundaries, where it is 6b. Average monthly temperatures in Lemoyne range from 29.9 °F in January to 74.9 °F in July, in Carlisle they range from 29.8 °F in January to 75.2 °F in July, and in Shippensburg they range from 29.6 °F in January to 74.6 °F in July. The latest temperature averages show some low-lying eastern areas of the county to have a humid subtropical climate (Cfa.)

Climate data for Harrisburg, Pennsylvania (Harrisburg Capital City Airport) 1991-2020 normals (Records 1939-2021)
Month	Jan	Feb	Mar	Apr	May	Jun	Jul	Aug	Sep	Oct	Nov	Dec	Year
Record high °F (°C)	73 (23)	83 (28)	86 (30)	93 (34)	97 (36)	100 (38)	107 (42)	101 (38)	102 (39)	97 (36)	84 (29)	75 (24)	107 (42)
Mean daily maximum °F (°C)	40.3 (4.6)	43.2 (6.2)	52.6 (11.4)	64.9 (18.3)	74.7 (23.7)	83.2 (28.4)	87.6 (30.9)	85.4 (29.7)	78.6 (25.9)	66.7 (19.3)	55.1 (12.8)	44.4 (6.9)	64.7 (18.2)
Daily mean °F (°C)	32.6 (0.3)	34.7 (1.5)	43.2 (6.2)	54.1 (12.3)	64.0 (17.8)	73.0 (22.8)	77.5 (25.3)	75.4 (24.1)	68.5 (20.3)	56.7 (13.7)	46.0 (7.8)	37.0 (2.8)	55.2 (12.9)
Mean daily minimum °F (°C)	24.9 (−3.9)	26.2 (−3.2)	33.9 (1.1)	43.3 (6.3)	53.2 (11.8)	62.8 (17.1)	67.4 (19.7)	65.5 (18.6)	58.4 (14.7)	46.7 (8.2)	37.0 (2.8)	29.5 (−1.4)	45.7 (7.6)
Record low °F (°C)	−9 (−23)	−5 (−21)	2 (−17)	19 (−7)	31 (−1)	40 (4)	49 (9)	45 (7)	30 (−1)	23 (−5)	13 (−11)	−8 (−22)	−9 (−23)
Average precipitation inches (mm)	2.64 (67)	2.36 (60)	3.35 (85)	3.70 (94)	3.48 (88)	3.72 (94)	4.30 (109)	3.68 (93)	4.12 (105)	3.68 (93)	2.80 (71)	3.15 (80)	40.98 (1,041)
Average precipitation days (≥ 0.01 in)	9	9	10	12	14	12	12	11	10	11	9	10	127
Source: NOAA

=== Adjacent counties ===
- Perry County (north)
- Dauphin County (east)
- York County (southeast)
- Adams County (south)
- Franklin County (southwest)

=== Major highways ===
- I-76 / Penna Turnpike
- I-81
- I-83
- US 11
- US 15
- PA 34
- PA 74
- PA 94
- PA 114
- PA 174
- PA 233
- PA 465
- PA 533
- PA 581
- PA 641
- PA 696
- PA 944
- PA 997

=== State protected areas ===
- Colonel Denning State Park
- Kings Gap Environmental Education and Training Center
- Pine Grove Furnace State Park

== Demographics ==
Historical population
Census	Pop.	Note	%±
1790	18,208		—
1800	25,386		39.4%
1810	26,757		5.4%
1820	23,606		−11.8%
1830	29,226		23.8%
1840	30,953		5.9%
1850	34,327		10.9%
1860	40,098		16.8%
1870	43,912		9.5%
1880	45,977		4.7%
1890	47,271		2.8%
1900	50,344		6.5%
1910	54,479		8.2%
1920	58,578		7.5%
1930	68,236		16.5%
1940	74,806		9.6%
1950	94,457		26.3%
1960	124,816		32.1%
1970	158,177		26.7%
1980	178,541		12.9%
1990	195,257		9.4%
2000	213,670		9.4%
2010	235,406		10.2%
2020	259,469		10.2%
2025 (est.)	277,270	▲	6.9%
U.S. Decennial Census; 1790-1960 1900-1990; 1990-2000 2010-2019

=== Racial and ethnic composition ===
Cumberland County, Pennsylvania – Racial and ethnic composition Note: the US Census treats Hispanic/Latino as an ethnic category. This table excludes Latinos from the racial categories and assigns them to a separate category. Hispanics/Latinos may be of any race.
Race / Ethnicity (NH = Non-Hispanic)	Pop 1980	Pop 1990	Pop 2000	Pop 2010	Pop 2020	% 1980	% 1990	% 2000	% 2010	% 2020
White alone (NH)	173,494	188,129	199,925	210,514	211,990	97.17%	96.35%	93.57%	89.43%	81.70%
Black or African American alone (NH)	2,432	2,979	4,959	7,237	10,581	1.36%	1.53%	2.32%	3.07%	4.08%
Native American or Alaska Native alone (NH)	131	235	251	293	318	0.07%	0.12%	0.12%	0.12%	0.12%
Asian alone (NH)	1,304	2,473	3,556	7,028	13,836	0.73%	1.27%	1.66%	2.99%	5.33%
Native Hawaiian or Pacific Islander alone (NH)	x	x	66	60	113	x	x	0.03%	0.03%	0.04%
Other race alone (NH)	313	86	183	229	1,074	0.18%	0.04%	0.09%	0.10%	0.41%
Mixed race or Multiracial (NH)	x	x	1,851	3,597	9,582	x	x	0.87%	1.53%	3.69%
Hispanic or Latino (any race)	867	1,355	2,883	6,448	11,975	0.49%	0.69%	1.35%	2.74%	4.62%
Total	178,541	195,257	213,674	235,406	259,469	100.00%	100.00%	100.00%	100.00%	100.00%

=== 2020 census ===
As of the 2020 census, the county had a population of 259,469. The median age was 40.8 years. 20.4% of residents were under the age of 18 and 19.5% of residents were 65 years of age or older. For every 100 females there were 96.5 males, and for every 100 females age 18 and over there were 94.5 males age 18 and over.

The racial makeup of the county was 82.8% White, 4.3% Black or African American, 0.2% American Indian and Alaska Native, 5.4% Asian, <0.1% Native Hawaiian and Pacific Islander, 1.8% from some other race, and 5.4% from two or more races. Hispanic or Latino residents of any race comprised 4.6% of the population.

79.1% of residents lived in urban areas, while 20.9% lived in rural areas.

There were 103,405 households in the county, of which 27.7% had children under the age of 18 living in them. Of all households, 51.0% were married-couple households, 17.0% were households with a male householder and no spouse or partner present, and 25.2% were households with a female householder and no spouse or partner present. About 28.9% of all households were made up of individuals and 12.8% had someone living alone who was 65 years of age or older.

There were 109,125 housing units, of which 5.2% were vacant. Among occupied housing units, 69.5% were owner-occupied and 30.5% were renter-occupied. The homeowner vacancy rate was 1.1% and the rental vacancy rate was 6.0%.

=== 2000 census ===
At the census of 2000, there were 213,674 people, 83,015 households, and 56,118 families residing in the county. The population density was 388 inhabitants per square mile (150/km^{2}). There were 86,951 housing units at an average density of 158 units per square mile (61/km^{2}). The racial makeup of the county was 94.40% White, 2.36% Black or African American, 0.13% Native American, 1.67% Asian, 0.04% Pacific Islander, 0.43% from other races, and 0.97% from two or more races. 1.35% of the population were Hispanic or Latino of any race. 35.3% were of German, 10.6% American, 10.1% Irish, 7.5% English and 6.8% Italian ancestry. 94.7% spoke English and 1.4% Spanish as their first language.

There were 83,015 households, out of which 29.50% had children under the age of 18 living with them, 56.50% were married couples living together, 8.00% had a female householder with no husband present, and 32.40% were non-families. 26.70% of all households were made up of individuals, and 10.30% had someone living alone who was 65 years of age or older. The average household size was 2.41 and the average family size was 2.92.

In the county, the population was spread out, with 22.00% under the age of 18, 10.60% from 18 to 24, 28.50% from 25 to 44, 24.10% from 45 to 64, and 14.90% who were 65 years of age or older. The median age was 38 years. For every 100 females, there were 95.20 males. For every 100 females age 18 and over, there were 92.70 males.

Its per capita income is $31,627, making it the wealthiest Pennsylvania county outside greater Philadelphia, and fifth wealthiest overall.

== Metropolitan Statistical Area ==
The United States Office of Management and Budget has designated Cumberland County as part of the Harrisburg-Carlisle, PA Metropolitan Statistical Area (MSA). As of the 2010 U.S. census the metropolitan area ranked 6th most populous in the State of Pennsylvania and the 96th most populous in the United States with a population of 549,475. Cumberland County is also a part of the larger Harrisburg–York–Lebanon combined statistical area (CSA), which combines the populations of Cumberland County as well as Adams, Dauphin, Lebanon, Perry and York Counties in Pennsylvania. The Combined Statistical Area ranked 5th in the State of Pennsylvania and 43rd most populous in the United States with a population of 1,219,422.

== Government and politics ==
Cumberland County has been a Republican Party stronghold in presidential contests since William McKinley's election in 1896, with only five Democratic Party candidates winning the county. The most recent Democrat to win the county in a presidential election was Lyndon B. Johnson in 1964, who won in a landslide statewide and nationally. In 2024, Kamala Harris won 44.45% of the vote in the county, the highest percentage since 1964, despite losing Pennsylvania and the overall presidential election.

=== Voter registration ===
United States presidential election results for Cumberland County, Pennsylvania
Year	Republican		Democratic		Third party(ies)	
Year	No.	%	No.	%	No.	%
1880	4,431	44.17%	5,462	54.45%	138	1.38%
1884	4,659	45.74%	5,375	52.77%	151	1.48%
1888	4,693	45.36%	5,386	52.05%	268	2.59%
1892	4,520	44.06%	5,446	53.09%	293	2.86%
1896	6,178	52.30%	5,202	44.04%	432	3.66%
1900	5,587	49.06%	5,428	47.66%	374	3.28%
1904	7,138	56.74%	5,038	40.05%	404	3.21%
1908	6,261	51.35%	5,403	44.32%	528	4.33%
1912	2,566	21.91%	5,023	42.89%	4,123	35.20%
1916	5,296	42.96%	6,432	52.17%	601	4.87%
1920	8,579	54.73%	6,455	41.18%	640	4.08%
1924	10,196	53.22%	7,643	39.89%	1,321	6.89%
1928	19,170	78.08%	5,189	21.14%	192	0.78%
1932	13,098	50.86%	12,086	46.93%	567	2.20%
1936	14,912	43.83%	18,850	55.41%	259	0.76%
1940	15,297	49.15%	15,758	50.63%	68	0.22%
1944	17,782	59.30%	12,068	40.25%	134	0.45%
1948	18,028	60.71%	11,421	38.46%	246	0.83%
1952	26,302	67.17%	12,762	32.59%	91	0.23%
1956	29,468	68.10%	13,651	31.55%	153	0.35%
1960	35,636	68.79%	15,968	30.83%	197	0.38%
1964	23,685	46.88%	26,633	52.71%	207	0.41%
1968	32,908	61.54%	15,467	28.93%	5,097	9.53%
1972	42,099	72.87%	14,562	25.20%	1,114	1.93%
1976	39,950	62.16%	23,008	35.80%	1,312	2.04%
1980	41,152	61.18%	19,789	29.42%	6,319	9.39%
1984	49,282	69.29%	21,374	30.05%	467	0.66%
1988	47,292	65.29%	24,613	33.98%	528	0.73%
1992	43,447	51.37%	26,635	31.49%	14,491	17.13%
1996	43,943	55.63%	28,749	36.40%	6,293	7.97%
2000	54,802	62.17%	31,053	35.23%	2,289	2.60%
2004	67,648	63.77%	37,928	35.75%	506	0.48%
2008	63,739	56.00%	48,306	42.44%	1,780	1.56%
2012	64,809	58.29%	44,367	39.90%	2,015	1.81%
2016	69,076	55.94%	47,085	38.13%	7,325	5.93%
2020	77,212	54.30%	62,245	43.78%	2,730	1.92%
2024	80,267	53.85%	66,255	44.45%	2,546	1.71%

United States Senate election results for Cumberland County, Pennsylvania1
Year	Republican		Democratic		Third party(ies)	
Year	No.	%	No.	%	No.	%
1994	39,718	61.24%	21,872	33.72%	3,268	5.04%
2000	55,799	64.56%	28,080	32.49%	2,556	2.96%
2006	42,410	53.65%	36,638	46.35%	0	0.00%
2012	61,296	55.71%	46,294	42.07%	2,445	2.22%
2018	54,525	52.23%	47,738	45.73%	2,137	2.05%
2024	78,178	53.04%	64,713	43.90%	4,512	3.06%

United States Senate election results for Cumberland County, Pennsylvania3
Year	Republican		Democratic		Third party(ies)	
Year	No.	%	No.	%	No.	%
1992	48,377	59.17%	30,245	36.99%	3,135	3.83%
1998	37,643	71.34%	13,276	25.16%	1,843	3.49%
2004	67,677	65.28%	27,171	26.21%	8,817	8.51%
2010	52,890	65.52%	27,829	34.48%	0	0.00%
2016	71,638	58.75%	44,796	36.74%	5,509	4.52%
2022	59,663	51.47%	53,278	45.96%	2,986	2.58%

Pennsylvania Gubernatorial election results for Cumberland County
Year	Republican		Democratic		Third party(ies)	
Year	No.	%	No.	%	No.	%
1970	22,970	52.05%	18,778	42.55%	2,382	5.40%
1974	24,047	52.88%	20,863	45.88%	562	1.24%
1978	35,311	69.88%	14,798	29.28%	425	0.84%
1982	32,743	59.51%	21,931	39.86%	347	0.63%
1986	33,285	62.53%	19,591	36.80%	355	0.67%
1990	16,692	33.94%	32,487	66.06%	0	0.00%
1994	32,903	50.40%	19,003	29.11%	13,381	20.50%
1998	37,801	70.93%	8,610	16.16%	6,882	12.91%
2002	40,966	61.37%	24,237	36.31%	1,549	2.32%
2006	46,189	58.52%	32,737	41.48%	0	0.00%
2010	56,284	69.65%	24,531	30.35%	0	0.00%
2014	43,625	58.22%	31,311	41.78%	0	0.00%
2018	49,496	47.37%	52,807	50.54%	2,175	2.08%
2022	52,280	45.07%	61,319	52.86%	2,403	2.07%

As of May 19, 2025, there are 179,481 registered voters in Cumberland County.

- Republican: 88,313 (49.20%)
- Democratic: 59,862 (33.35%)
- Independent: 24,624 (13.72%)
- Third Parties: 6,682 (3.72%)
Chart of Voter Registration
1. Republican (49.2%)
2. Democratic (33.4%)
3. Independent (13.7%)
4. Other Parties (3.72%)

The Republican Party has been dominant in Cumberland County politics since the 1890s, with the victories of Robert P. Casey for governor in 1990, Bob Casey Jr. for state treasurer in 2004, Tom Wolf for governor in 2018, and Josh Shapiro for governor in 2022 being among the few times where a statewide Democrat carried the county. All but two row offices and all legislative seats serving Cumberland are held by Republicans except for one State Representative.

=== County commissioners ===
- Gary Eichelberger, Independent
- Jean Foschi, Democrat
- Kelly Neiderer, chairman, Republican

=== Other county offices ===
- Clerk of Courts, Dennis Lebo, Republican
- Controller, Alfred Whitcomb, Republican
- Coroner Charles Hall, Republican
- District Attorney, Seán M. McCormack, Republican
- Prothonotary, Montana Hartman, Democrat
- Recorder of Deeds, Susan G. Turner, Democrat
- Register of Wills, Lisa M. Grayson, Esq., Republican
- Sheriff, Jody Smith, Republican
- Treasurer, Kelly Neiderer, Republican

=== State representatives ===
- Thomas Kutz, Republican, 87th district
- Sheryl M. Delozier, Republican, 88th district
- Nate Davidson, Democrat, 103rd district
- Torren C. Ecker, Republican, 193rd district
- Barbara Gleim, Republican, 199th district

=== State senators ===
- Dawn Keefer, Republican, 31st district
- Greg Rothman, Republican, 34th district

=== United States House of Representatives ===
- Scott Perry, Republican, 10th district
- John Joyce, Republican, 13th district

=== United States Senate ===
- John Fetterman, Democratic
- Dave McCormick, Republican

== Education ==
=== Colleges and universities ===
- Central Penn College
- Dickinson College
- Messiah University
- Penn State Dickinson Law
- Shippensburg University of Pennsylvania
- U.S. Army War College

=== Community, junior and technical colleges ===
- ITT Technical Institute

=== Public school districts ===
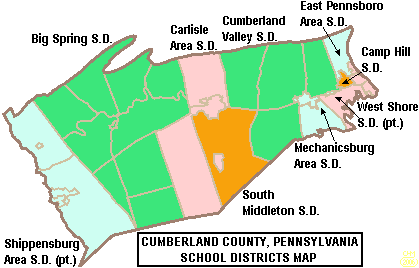
Map of Cumberland County, Pennsylvania School Districts

School districts include:

- Big Spring School District
- Camp Hill School District
- Carlisle Area School District
- Cumberland Valley School District
- East Pennsboro Area School District
- Mechanicsburg Area School District
- Shippensburg Area School District (also in Franklin County)
- South Middleton School District
- West Shore School District (also in York County)

=== Public charter schools ===
- Commonwealth Connections Academy Charter School - Mechanicsburg

=== Technical school ===
- Cumberland-Perry Area Vocational Technical School

=== Private schools ===
As reported by the National Center for Educational Statistics

- Allen Mennonite School - Dillsburg
- Berean Christian Day School - Newville
- Best Friends - New Cumberland
- Bethel Christian Academy - Carlisle
- Blue Ridge Mennonite School - Carlisle
- Brookside Montessori School - Camp Hill
- Chestnut Groove School - Shippensburg
- Children's School of New Cumberland - New Cumberland
- Dickinson College Children's Center - Carlisle
- Emmanuel Baptist Christian Academy - Mechanicsburg
- Faith Tabernacle School - Mechanicsburg
- Good Shepherd Elementary School - Camp Hill
- Harrisburg Academy - Wormleysburg
- Hickory Lane School - Newburg
- Hidden Valley School - Carlisle
- Kindercare Learning Center - Mechanicsburg
- Learning and Sharing - New Cumberland
- Logos School - Carlisle
- Living Faith School - Shippensburg
- Meadow Run - Newburg
- Mechanicsburg Learning Center - Mechanicsburg
- Middle Run Parochial School - Shippensburg
- Oak Grove Parochial School - Shippensburg
- Oakwood Baptist Day School - Camp Hill
- Otterbein School - Newburg
- Quarry Hill School - Newville
- Rocky View School Parochial - Newville
- South Mountain Parochial School - Shippensburg
- South Mountain Parochial School - Newville
- Spring Hill Parochial School - Shipensburg
- St. Joseph School - Mechanicsburg
- St Patrick School - Carlisle
- St Theresa Elementary School - New Cumberland
- Sunset Amish School - Newburg
- The Children's Garden of St Johns Lutheran Church - Shiremanstown
- The Christian School of Grace Baptist Church - Carlisle
- The Goddard School - Enola
- The Goddard School - Mechanicsburg
- The Learning Center - Camp Hill
- Trinity High School (Camp Hill, Pennsylvania)
- West Shore Christian Academy - Shiremanstown
- Yellow Breeches Education Center - Boiling Springs

=== Public libraries ===
- Cumberland County Library System
- Amelia S. Givin Free Library
- Bosler Memorial Library
- East Pennsboro Branch Library
- Cleve J. Fredricksen Public Library
- John Graham Public Library
- New Cumberland Public Library
- Shippensburg Public Library
- Joseph T. Simpson Public Library

== Communities ==
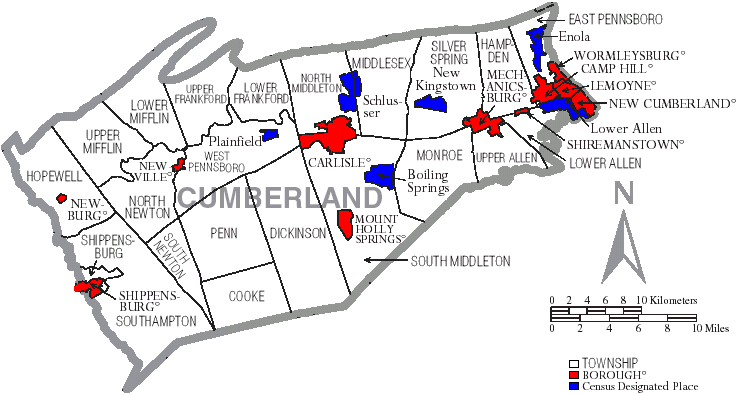
Map of Cumberland County, Pennsylvania with Municipal Labels showing Boroughs (red), Townships (white), and Census-designated places (blue).

Under Pennsylvania law, there are four types of incorporated municipalities: cities, boroughs, townships, and, in at most two cases, towns. The following boroughs and townships are located in Cumberland County:

=== Boroughs ===
- Camp Hill
- Carlisle (county seat)
- Lemoyne
- Mechanicsburg
- Mount Holly Springs
- New Cumberland
- Newburg
- Newville
- Shippensburg (partly in Franklin County)
- Shiremanstown
- Wormleysburg

=== Townships ===
- Cooke
- Dickinson
- East Pennsboro
- Hampden
- Hopewell
- Lower Allen
- Lower Frankford
- Lower Mifflin
- Middlesex
- Monroe
- North Middleton
- North Newton
- Penn
- Shippensburg
- Silver Spring
- South Middleton
- South Newton
- Southampton
- Upper Allen
- Upper Frankford
- Upper Mifflin
- West Pennsboro

=== Census-designated places ===
Census-designated places are geographical areas designated by the U.S. Census Bureau for the purposes of compiling demographic data. They are not actual jurisdictions under Pennsylvania law. Other unincorporated communities, such as villages, may be listed here as well.

- Boiling Springs
- Carlisle Barracks
- Enola
- Lower Allen
- Messiah College
- New Kingstown
- Plainfield
- Schlusser
- Shippensburg University
- West Fairview

=== Unincorporated communities ===
- Bloserville
- Grantham
- Hogestown
- Huntsdale
- Lisburn
- Summerdale
- West Hill

=== Population ranking ===
The population ranking of the following table is based on the 2010 census of Cumberland County.

† county seat

Rank	City/Town/etc.	Municipal type	Population (2010 Census)
1	† Carlisle	Borough	18,682
2	Mechanicsburg	Borough	8,981
3	Camp Hill	Borough	7,888
4	New Cumberland	Borough	7,277
5	Lower Allen	CDP	6,694
6	Enola	CDP	6,111
7	Shippensburg (partially in Franklin County)	Borough	5,492
8	Schlusser	CDP	5,265
9	Lemoyne	Borough	4,553
10	Boiling Springs	CDP	3,225
11	Wormleysburg	Borough	3,070
12	Shippensburg University	CDP	2,625
13	Messiah College	CDP	2,215
14	Mount Holly Springs	Borough	2,030
15	Shiremanstown	Borough	1,569
16	Newville	Borough	1,326
17	West Fairview	CDP	1,282
18	New Kingstown	CDP	495
19	Plainfield	CDP	399
20	Newburg	Borough	336

== Recreation ==
Annual events occur in downtown Carlisle at the Carlisle Fairgrounds. The Capital City Mall in Lower Allen Township serves the West Shore, the Carlisle area, and surrounding communities. Williams Grove Speedway is a half-mile auto-racing track in the county. The Appalachian Trail crosses the central part of Cumberland, which has two state parks:

- Colonel Denning State Park (also in Perry County)
- Pine Grove Furnace State Park (also in Adams County)

== See also ==
- National Register of Historic Places listings in Cumberland County, Pennsylvania
