= Lower Mifflin Township, Pennsylvania =

Township in Pennsylvania, US

Coordinates: 40°14′00″N 77°26′59″W

- Township
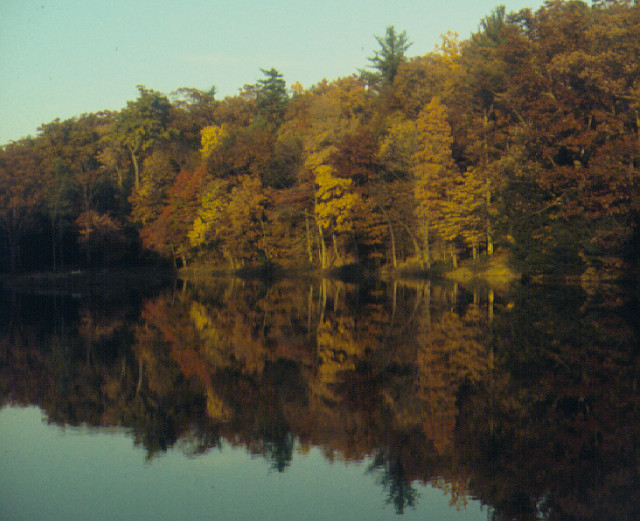
- Colonel Denning State Park

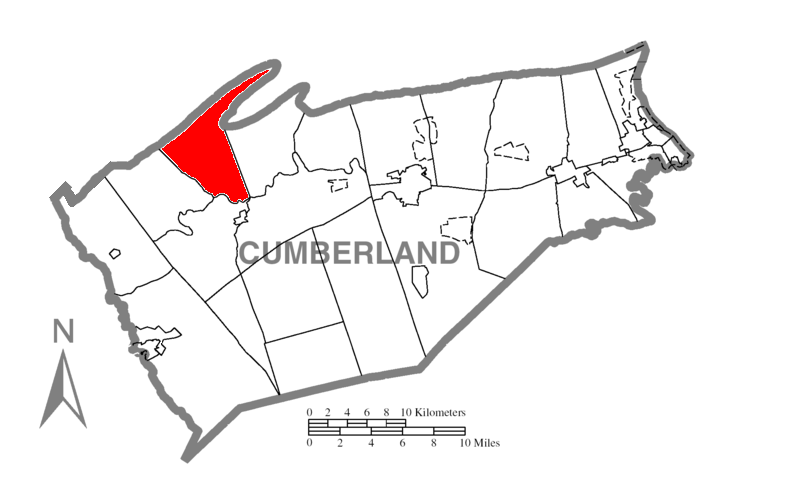
- Map of Cumberland County, Pennsylvania highlighting Lower Mifflin Township

- Map of Cumberland County, Pennsylvania
- Country: United States
- State: Pennsylvania
- County: Cumberland

Government
  - Type: Board of Supervisors

Area
  - Total: 23.90 sq mi (61.91 km^{2})
  - Land: 23.77 sq mi (61.56 km^{2})
  - Water: 0.14 sq mi (0.36 km^{2})

Population (2010)
  - Total: 1,783
  - Estimate (2016): 1,780
  - Density: 74.9/sq mi (28.92/km^{2})
- Time zone: UTC-5 (Eastern (EST))
  - Summer (DST): UTC-4 (EDT)
- Area code: 717
- FIPS code: 42-041-44984
- Website: http://www.lowermifflintownship.com/

Historical population
Census	Pop.	Note	%±
2000	1,620		—
2010	1,783		10.1%
2016 (est.)	1,780		−0.2%
U.S. Decennial Census

Lower Mifflin Township is a township in Cumberland County, Pennsylvania, United States. The population was 1,783 at the 2010 census.

== Geography ==
The township is in northwestern Cumberland County, bordered to the north by Perry County. The county boundary follows the crest of Blue Mountain, which in this area makes a large double bend known as Doubling Gap. Colonel Denning State Park is located within the bend, in the valley of Doubling Gap Creek, which flows south out of the mountain area and across the township to Conodoguinet Creek, which forms the southern boundary of the township and is a tributary of the Susquehanna River.

The Pennsylvania Turnpike (Interstate 76) crosses the southern end of the township, but with no direct access.

According to the United States Census Bureau, the township has a total area of 23.9 square miles (61.9 km^{2}), of which 23.8 square miles (61.6 km^{2}) is land and 0.2 square miles (0.4 km^{2}), or 0.58%, is water.

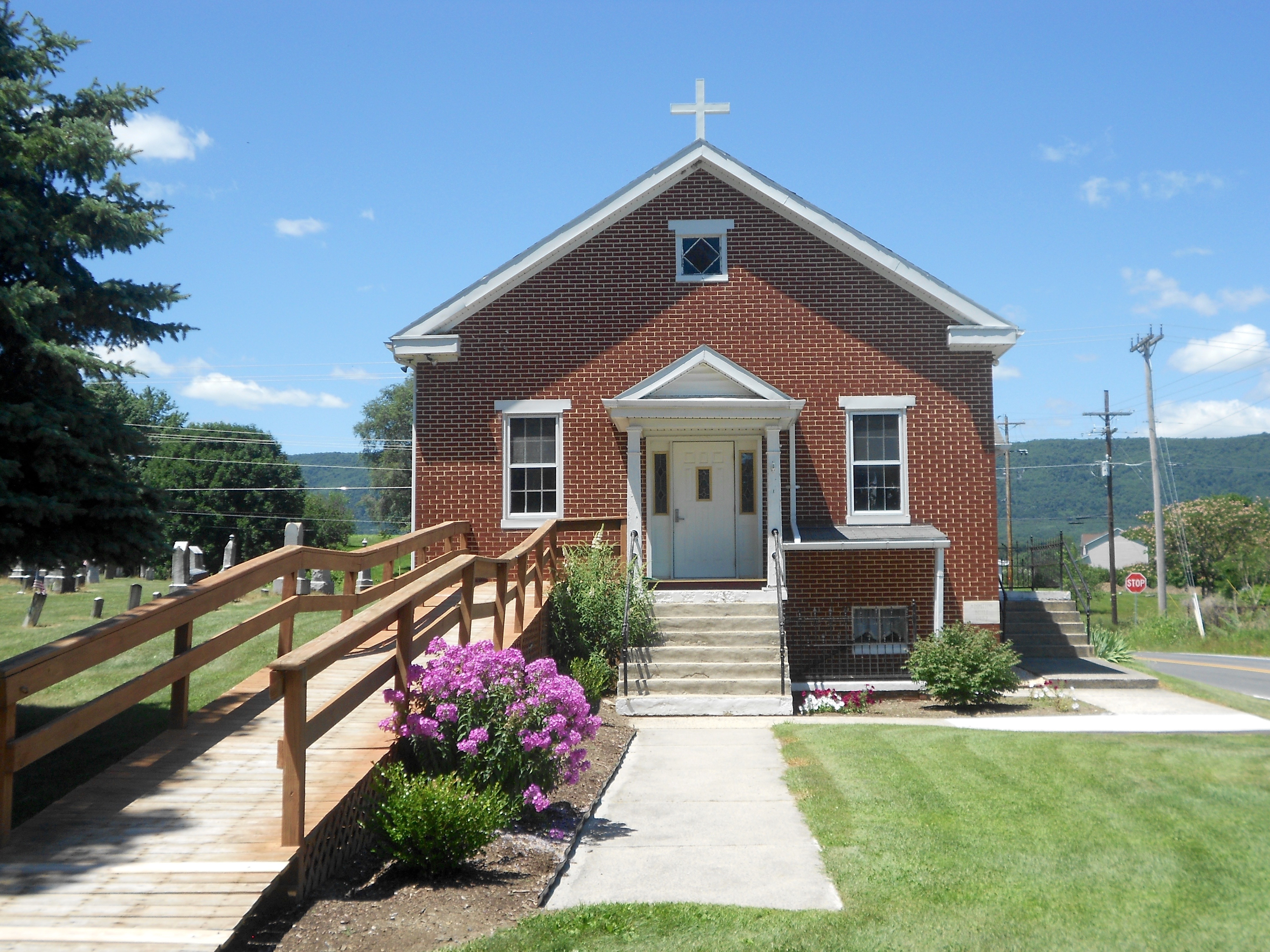
Center Lutheran Church

== Demographics ==
As of the census of 2000, there were 1,620 people, 586 households, and 471 families residing in the township. The population density was 67.5 inhabitants per square mile (26.1/km^{2}). There were 616 housing units at an average density of 25.7 units per square mile (9.9 units/km^{2}). The racial makeup of the township was 98.77% White, 0.56% African American, 0.06% from other races, and 0.62% from two or more races. Hispanic or Latino of any race were 0.68% of the population.

There were 586 households, out of which 39.1% had children under the age of 18 living with them, 70.1% were married couples living together, 6.0% had a female householder with no husband present, and 19.5% were non-families. 15.5% of all households were made up of individuals, and 6.3% had someone living alone who was 65 years of age or older. The average household size was 2.76 and the average family size was 3.06.

In the township the population was spread out, with 28.7% under the age of 18, 7.0% from 18 to 24, 31.4% from 25 to 44, 23.1% from 45 to 64, and 9.8% who were 65 years of age or older. The median age was 36 years. For every 100 females, there were 98.8 males. For every 100 females age 18 and over, there were 95.4 males.

The median income for a household in the township was $42,578, and the median income for a family was $43,846. Males had a median income of $31,528 versus $23,047 for females. The per capita income for the township was $17,687. About 5.1% of families and 5.7% of the population were below the poverty line, including 3.3% of those under age 18 and 14.1% of those age 65 or over.

== Historical Context ==
Mifflin Township, which comprised the current area of Upper Mifflin and Lower Mifflin Townships, was established in 1797 from Newton Township, Cumberland County. In 1892 Mifflin Township separated and became Lower Mifflin Township and Upper Mifflin Township. Early settlers of Cumberland County were mostly of Scots-Irish descent. By the end of the 1700s the majority of settlers had shifted from Scots-Irish to German. During the French and Indian War in the 1750s it was feared that Indian tribes in Western Pennsylvania would raid settlements in Cumberland County. Between 1755 and 1758 several forts were established in the County to protect the residents. These included Mitchel’s Fort at Three Square Hollow in Upper Mifflin Township, and McComb’s Blockhouse near Doubling Gap in Lower Mifflin Township. In 1865, prospectors drilling for oil in Lower Mifflin Township struck a large high quality aquifer. Due to the water’s purity, it was bottled and used for medicinal purposes in 1885. Later, the Cloverdale Spring Company was formed and used the water for its soft drink business. A bottling plant was built near Newville in 1919 which became the Allegheny Pepsi Cola Bottling Company in 1961. The State acquired the area of Colonel Denning State Park in Doubling Gap as a recreation area in 1930. The Civilian Conservation Corps developed it as a park in 1936. The park is named for William Denning who lived near Newville and manufactured cannons for the Continental Army during the Revolutionary War. Tuscarora State Forest is also administered by the Pennsylvania Department of Conservation and Natural Resources (DCNR) and was named for the Iroquois-nation tribe that once inhabited the area.
