= Colonel Denning State Park =

State park in Cumberland County, Pennsylvania

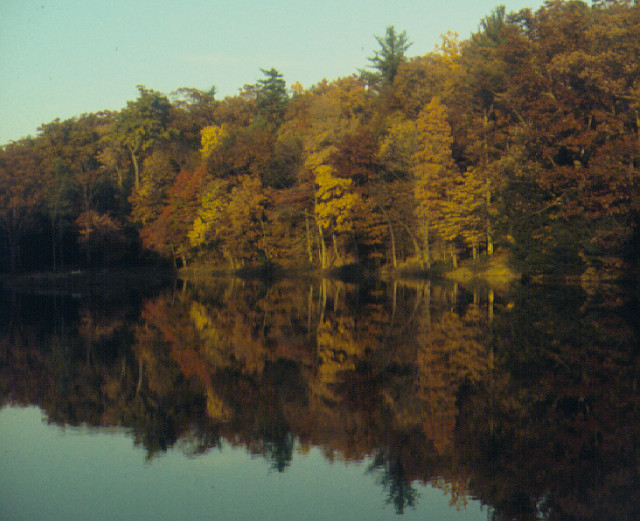
- Doubling Gap Lake

- Location within Pennsylvania Location within the United States
- Interactive map of Colonel Denning State Park
- Location: Cumberland County, Pennsylvania, United States
- Coordinates: 40°16′51″N 77°25′06″W
- Area: 273 acres (110 ha)
- Elevation: 1,132 ft (345 m)
- Established: 1936
- Administrator: Pennsylvania Department of Conservation and Natural Resources
- Named for: William Denning
- Website: Official website
- Pennsylvania State Parks

Colonel Denning State Park is a 273-acre (110 ha) Pennsylvania state park in Lower Mifflin Township, Cumberland County, Pennsylvania in the United States. The park is in the Doubling Gap of Blue Mountain on Pennsylvania Route 233 between Newville and Landisburg. Doubling Gap Lake is a man-made lake covering 3.5 acres (1.4 ha). Colonel Denning State Park is surrounded by Tuscarora State Forest.

== History ==
Colonel Denning State Park is named in honor of William Denning who was, oddly, never a colonel. He was a veteran of the American Revolutionary War and a manufacturer of wrought iron cannons.

Denning was a sergeant in the Continental Army from March 1778 until April 1780. He was stationed near Carlisle at Washingtonburg Forge, now the Carlisle Barracks. While stationed there, Denning explored and mastered the technique of creating lighter and more easily transported cannons. He did this by welding strips of wrought iron together in layers and building the cannon with the layers. Denning lived out his life following the Revolution near Newville. His grave can be found in the cemetery of Big Spring Presbyterian Church in Newville.

Many of the facilities at Colonel Denning State Park were constructed during the Great Depression in the 1930s by the Civilian Conservation Corps. It was formally opened in 1936.

== Recreation ==
Colonel Denning State Park is open to hunting. Hunters are expected to follow the rules and regulations of the Pennsylvania Game Commission. The common game species are squirrels, white-tailed deer, and turkeys. The hunting of groundhogs is prohibited. Hunting is also permitted in the nearby Tuscarora State Forest. Doubling Gap Lake is open for trout fishing during the trout season established by the Pennsylvania Fish and Boat Commission.

There are 18 miles (29 km) of hiking trails at Colonel Denning State Park and the park serves as a trailhead for the Tuscarora Trail (105 miles (169 km)). Visitors are permitted to swim at their own risk in Doubling Gap Lake; lifeguards are not provided.

There are over 200 picnic tables available at Colonel Denning State Park. Flat Rock trail is a 4-mile (6.4 km) out-and-back hike reaching a peak elevation of 1,987 feet (606 m) at Flat Rock. At the rock, a cool breeze is welcome to hikers in the summertime. Occasionally, black bears are seen along the trail.

The camping season at Colonel Denning State Park begins with the start of trout season and ends at the conclusion of deer season. There are 52 tent and trailer sites. Each site is equipped with a fire ring and picnic table. Outhouses are available at the campsite. On Flat Rock Trail 1.1 miles (1.8 km) up the mountain, a camping shelter was built as an Eagle Scout Project in 2000. A picnic table and fire pit accommodate the shelter along with an outhouse located a few hundred feet away.
