= Bob Adams (1920s pitcher) =

American baseball player (1901–1996)

- Adams pictured in Epitome 1934, the Lehigh University yearbook
- Pitcher
- Born: July 24, 1901; Holyoke, Massachusetts, U.S.
- Died: October 17, 1996 (aged 95); Lemoyne, Pennsylvania, U.S.
- Batted: Right Threw: Right

MLB debut
- September 22, 1925, for the Boston Red Sox

Last MLB appearance
- September 23, 1925, for the Boston Red Sox

MLB statistics
- Win–loss record: 0–0
- Earned run average: 7.94
- Strikeouts: 1
- Stats at Baseball Reference

Teams
- Boston Red Sox (1925)

Robert Burnette Adams (July 24, 1901 – October 17, 1996) was an American professional baseball pitcher in Major League Baseball.

== Biography ==
Adams was born in Holyoke, Massachusetts, and attended Lehigh University. While at Lehigh, he played both football and baseball.

A right-handed pitcher, Adams appeared in two games with the Boston Red Sox during the 1925 season. He debuted on September 22, 1925. A day later, he played his final game.

In 5 2/3 innings pitched, Adams came out of the bullpen and got no decisions, allowing five earned runs (7.94) and giving up 10 hits with one strikeout and three walks. As a hitter, he went 1-for-3 with one run scored.

From the 1929 season through the 1937 season, Adams coached the Lehigh Engineers baseball program at Lehigh University in Bethlehem, Pennsylvania. He also worked as an assistant coach with the school's football program.

== Death ==
Adams died in Lemoyne, Pennsylvania, on October 17, 1996, at the age of 95.
