= Shiremanstown, Pennsylvania =

Borough in Pennsylvania, US

- Borough
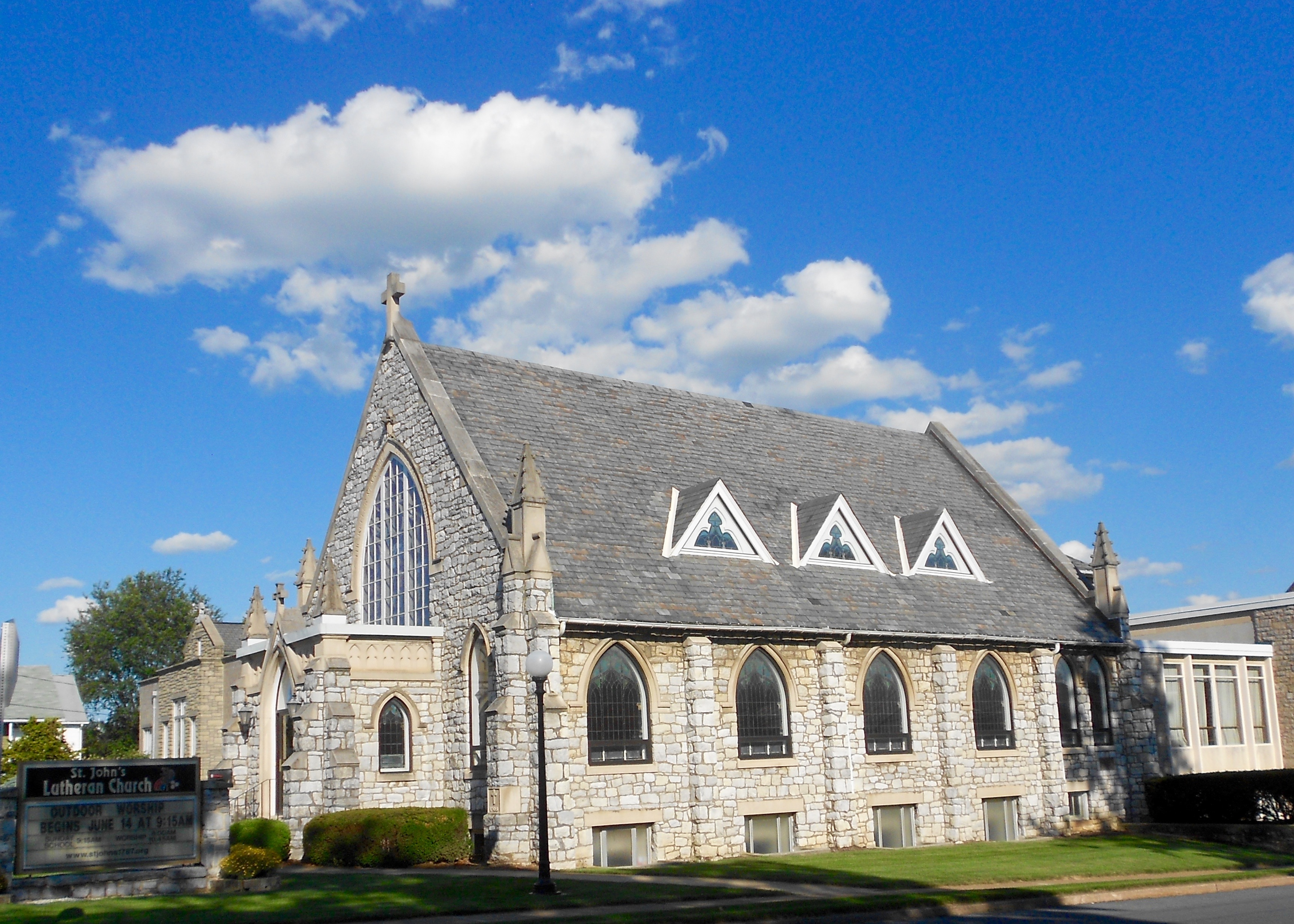
- St. John's Lutheran Church

- Location of Shiremanstown in Cumberland County, Pennsylvania

- Location in Pennsylvania and the United States Shiremanstown (the United States)
- Coordinates: 40°13′22″N 76°57′15″W
- Country: United States
- State: Pennsylvania
- County: Cumberland

Government
  - Type: Borough Council

Area
  - Total: 0.31 sq mi (0.79 km^{2})
  - Land: 0.31 sq mi (0.79 km^{2})
  - Water: 0 sq mi (0.00 km^{2})
- Elevation: 420 ft (130 m)

Population (2010)
  - Total: 1,569
  - Estimate (2019): 1,628
  - Density: 5,315.5/sq mi (2,052.32/km^{2})
- Time zone: UTC-5 (Eastern (EST))
  - Summer (DST): UTC-4 (EDT)
- ZIP code: 17011
- Area code: 717
- FIPS code: 42-70384

Shiremanstown is a borough in Cumberland County, Pennsylvania, United States. Bordered to the north by Hampden Township and to the south by Lower Allen Township, it is part of the Harrisburg–Carlisle Metropolitan Statistical Area.

As of the 2020 census, Shiremanstown had a population of 1,634.

== History ==
The borough has a history that dates back prior to its establishment in 1864. The borough was named after Daniel Shireman, a German immigrant who settled in the area in the 18th century. Daniel Shireman was a butcher by trade and became a prominent figure in the community.

Before its incorporation as a borough, the area was part of Lower Allen Township. The community grew around the Shireman family and their contributions to the local economy. The town community grew again with the addition of St. John's Lutheran Church.

Sometime before 1797, a German Reformed church and school were established near the community of Shiremanstown in Cumberland County, Pennsylvania. It became known as the "Peace Church." Nearly one hundred years later, the log structure was still in use, but only as a school by that time. As the surrounding communities grew over the years, the church's congregation also continued to grow. Eventually, the congregation became known as St. John's Evangelical Lutheran Church.

In 1897, leaders of the congregation expanded the church further by purchasing the old Messiah church located in Shiremanstown. Initially used for evening services, that building also became the congregation's home during the winter months, and was in use regularly until it was destroyed by fire on September 2, 1908.

St. John's Evangelical Lutheran Church is now located on Main Street in Shiremanstown.

== Geography ==
Located in eastern Cumberland County at 40°13′22″N 76°57′15″W. Shiremanstown is bordered to the north by Hampden Township and to the south by Lower Allen Township. It is 6 miles (10 km) southwest of the center of Harrisburg, the state capital.

According to the United States Census Bureau, the borough has a total area of 0.30 square miles (0.77 km^{2}), all land.

== Demographics ==
Historical population
Census	Pop.	Note	%±
1880	404		—
1890	432		6.9%
1900	504		16.7%
1910	545		8.1%
1920	635		16.5%
1930	731		15.1%
1940	777		6.3%
1950	887		14.2%
1960	1,212		36.6%
1970	1,773		46.3%
1980	1,719		−3.0%
1990	1,567		−8.8%
2000	1,521		−2.9%
2010	1,569		3.2%
2020	1,634		4.1%

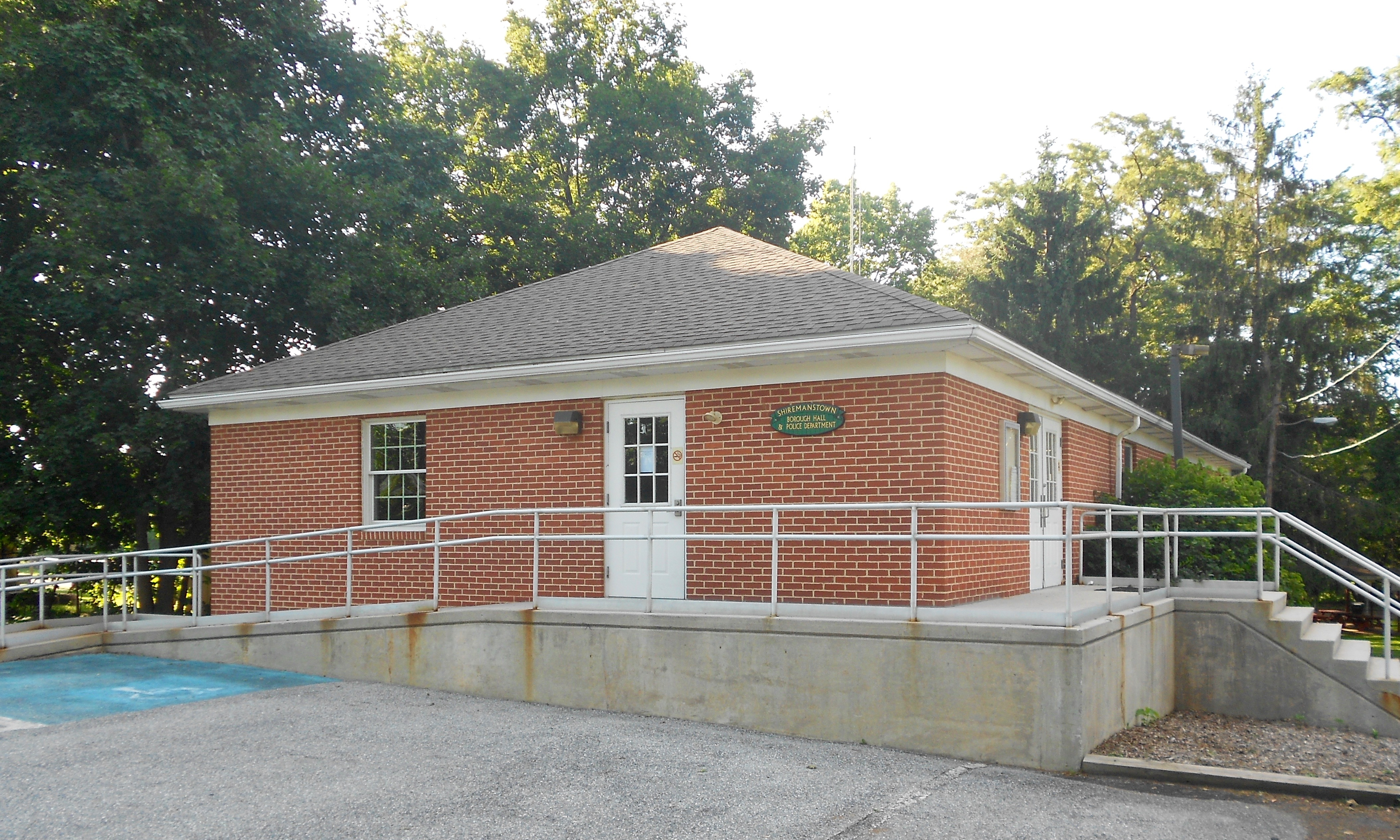
Shiremanstown Borough Hall

As of the 2000 census, there were one thousand five hundred and twenty-one people, seven hundred and nineteen households and four hundred and seven families residing in the borough. The population density was 5,105.8 people per square mile (1,971.4 people/km^{2}).

There were seven hundred and forty-two housing units at an average density of 2,490.8 per square mile (961.7/km^{2}).

The racial makeup of the borough was 95.33% White, 0.53% African American, 0.07% Native American, 2.43% Asian, 0.33% from other races, and 1.31% from two or more races. Hispanic or Latino of any race were 0.53% of the population.

There were seven hundred and nineteen households, out of which 22.5% had children under the age of eighteen living with them; 46.2% were married couples living together, 8.8% had a female householder with no husband present, and 43.3% were non-families. 38.0% of all households were made up of individuals, and 11.7% had someone living alone who was sixty-five years of age or older. The average household size was 2.12 and the average family size was 2.83.

In the borough the population was spread out, with 20.2% under the age of eighteen, 7.0% from eighteen to twenty-four, 29.9% from twenty-five to forty-four, 23.6% from forty-five to sixty-four, and 19.3% who were sixty-five years of age or older. The median age was forty years. For every one hundred females, there were 84.6 males.

For every one hundred females aged eighteen and over, there were 84.5 males.

The median household income in the borough was $43,971, and the median income for a family was $55,268. Males had a median income of $37,500 compared with that of $30,326 for females. The per capita income for the borough was $21,812.

Roughly 1.8% of families and 5.0% of the population were below the poverty line, including 3.5% of those under age eighteen and 2.8% of those aged sixty-five or over.
