= Fairview Township, York County, Pennsylvania =

Township in Pennsylvania, US

Coordinates: 40°11′00″N 76°49′59″W

- Township
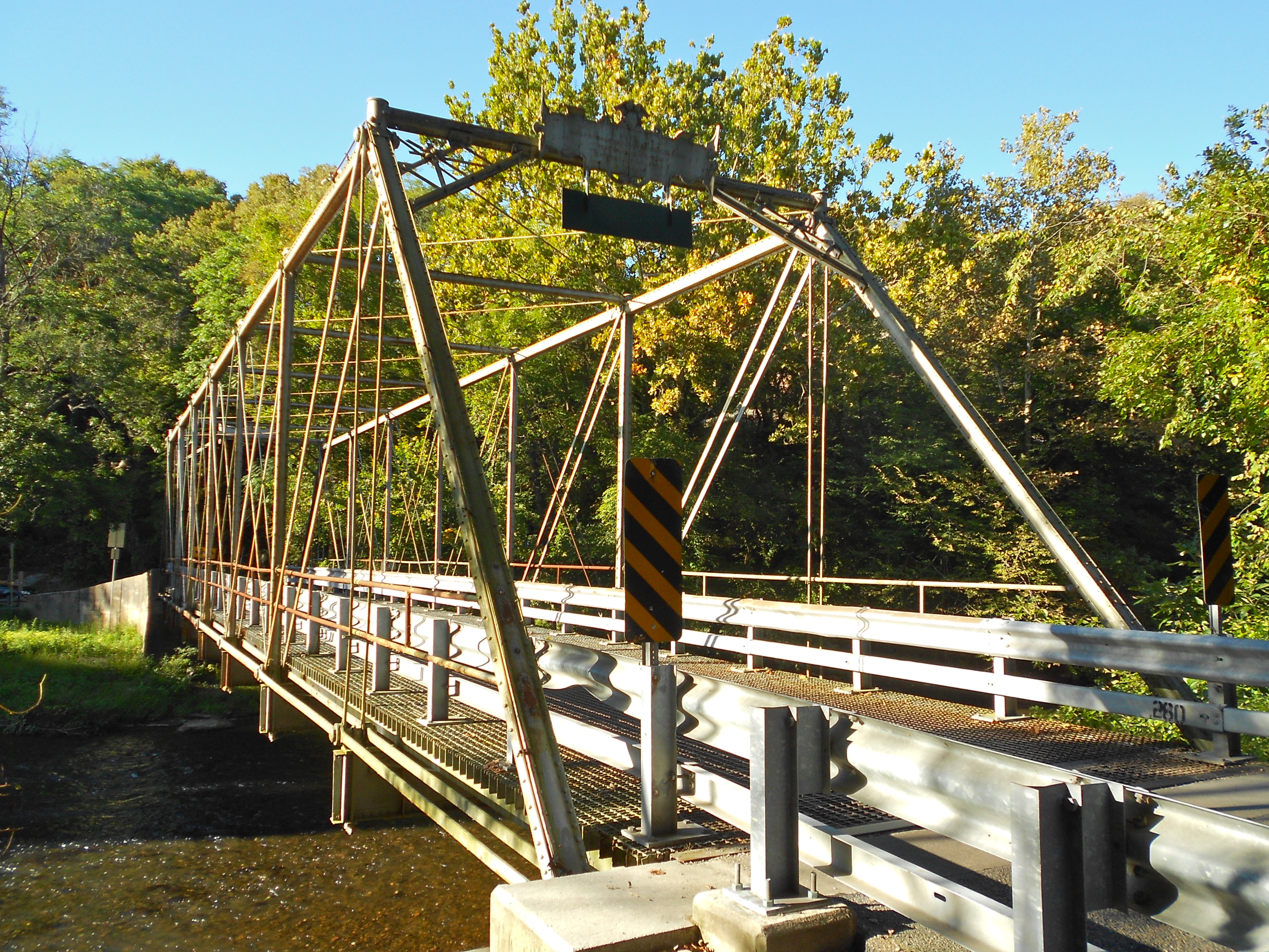
- Etters Bridge

- Location in York County and the state of Pennsylvania.
- Country: United States
- State: Pennsylvania
- County: York
- Settled: 1730
- Incorporated: 1803

Government
  - Type: Board of Supervisors

Area
  - Total: 35.65 sq mi (92.34 km^{2})
  - Land: 35.58 sq mi (92.14 km^{2})
  - Water: 0.077 sq mi (0.20 km^{2})

Population (2020)
  - Total: 17,448 ▲
  - Estimate (2023): 17,675
  - Density: 486.1/sq mi (187.69/km^{2})
- Time zone: UTC-5 (Eastern (EST))
  - Summer (DST): UTC-4 (EDT)
- Area code: 717
- FIPS code: 42-133-24936

Historical population
Census	Pop.	Note	%±
1850	2,138		—
1860	2,126		−0.6%
1870	1,941		−8.7%
1880	2,150		10.8%
1890	2,042		−5.0%
1900	2,078		1.8%
1910	2,028		−2.4%
1920	2,019		−0.4%
1930	2,092		3.6%
1940	2,302		10.0%
1950	5,514		139.5%
1960	6,530		18.4%
1970	9,248		41.6%
1980	11,941		29.1%
1990	13,258		11.0%
2000	14,321		8.0%
2010	16,668		16.4%
2020	17,448		4.7%
2023 (est.)	17,675		1.3%
U.S. Decennial Census

Fairview Township is a township in York County, Pennsylvania, United States. The population was 17,448 at the 2020 census.

== Geography ==
According to the United States Census Bureau, the township has a total area of 35.7 square miles (92 km^{2}), of which 35.6 square miles (92 km^{2}) is land and 0.1 square miles (0.26 km^{2}), or 0.17%, is water.

Fairview is close to the state capital, Harrisburg, which is in Dauphin County. (The boroughs of New Cumberland and Lemoyne, both in Cumberland County, lie between them.)

== Demographics ==
As of the census of 2000, there were 14,321 people, 5,480 households, and 4,131 families residing in the township. The population density was 402.2 inhabitants per square mile (155.3/km^{2}). There were 5,788 housing units at an average density of 162.6 units per square mile (62.8 units/km^{2}). The racial makeup of the township was 96.49% White, 0.87% African American, 0.12% Native American, 1.00% Asian, 0.08% Pacific Islander, 0.50% from other races, and 0.94% from two or more races. Hispanic or Latino of any race were 1.30% of the population.

There were 5,480 households, out of which 33.6% had children under the age of 18 living with them, 65.6% were married couples living together, 6.7% had a female householder with no husband present, and 24.6% were non-families. 19.6% of all households were made up of individuals, and 6.8% had someone living alone who was 65 years of age or older. The average household size was 2.59 and the average family size was 2.98.

In the township the population was spread out, with 24.4% under the age of 18, 6.2% from 18 to 24, 30.4% from 25 to 44, 27.5% from 45 to 64, and 11.5% who were 65 years of age or older. The median age was 39 years. For every 100 females, there were 99.2 males. For every 100 females age 18 and over, there were 96.4 males.

The median income for a household in the township was $57,150, and the median income for a family was $65,903. Males had a median income of $42,579 versus $30,965 for females. The per capita income for the township was $26,343. About 2.8% of families and 3.9% of the population were below the poverty line, including 4.6% of those under age 18 and 4.7% of those age 65 or over.

== History ==
Originally settled by the English Quakers from Chester County as early as 1730, and German immigrants from the York and Hanover areas in the late 18th century, much of the land now encompassed by Fairview Township was part of Pennsborough Township, Lancaster County. York County, when separated from Lancaster in 1749, had no definitely established northern boundary. In 1751, after the formation of Cumberland from Lancaster County, the Provincial Assembly passed a special act making Yellow Breeches Creek the official boundary between counties. At that time, the lands in this area were annexed to Newberry Township, where they remained until February 1803, when the York County Court approved petitions of area citizens to create the Township of Fairview.

In the mid-18th century, the area known as New Market was owned by John Harris, founding father of Harrisburg and a trader with the large Shawnee Indian settlement at the mouth of Yellow Breeches Creek. By 1806, the area boasted several churches, stores, a working forge, and a distillery. The growth of this particular portion of the township was due, in large part, to the establishment of a ferry across the Susquehanna River and the York-Harrisburg Road, which passed through the area. In 1807, a 120-lot village was laid out, and lots were sold by lottery drawing held at the local tavern. The owner of the New Market Forge, Jacob Haldeman Sr., who also had a working forge in Lisburn (thus, Forge Road), was responsible for laying out the town of New Cumberland in 1814, and selling the lots with the same lottery method used for New Market.

Fairview Township began as an agricultural area, with only a small amount of industry and trade. Because of its primary agricultural base, township population growth was very slow after the initial settlement. The first census count in 1820 was 1,764. Eighty years later, in 1900, the number reached 2,042, an increase of only 278. By 1950, it had more than doubled to 5,514, and 1990 figures showed the township population at 13,258. The development of better highway systems and the suburban growth of the Harrisburg area have greatly changed portions of the township over the last 50 years.

The Ashton-Hursh House and Etters Bridge are listed on the National Register of Historic Places.

== Infrastructure ==
Capital City Airport (currently used by general aviation; formerly Harrisburg's principal airport) and the New Cumberland Army Depot both lie in Fairview Township.
