= Lower Allen Township, Pennsylvania =

Township in Pennsylvania, US

Coordinates: 40°13′01″N 76°52′28″W

- Township
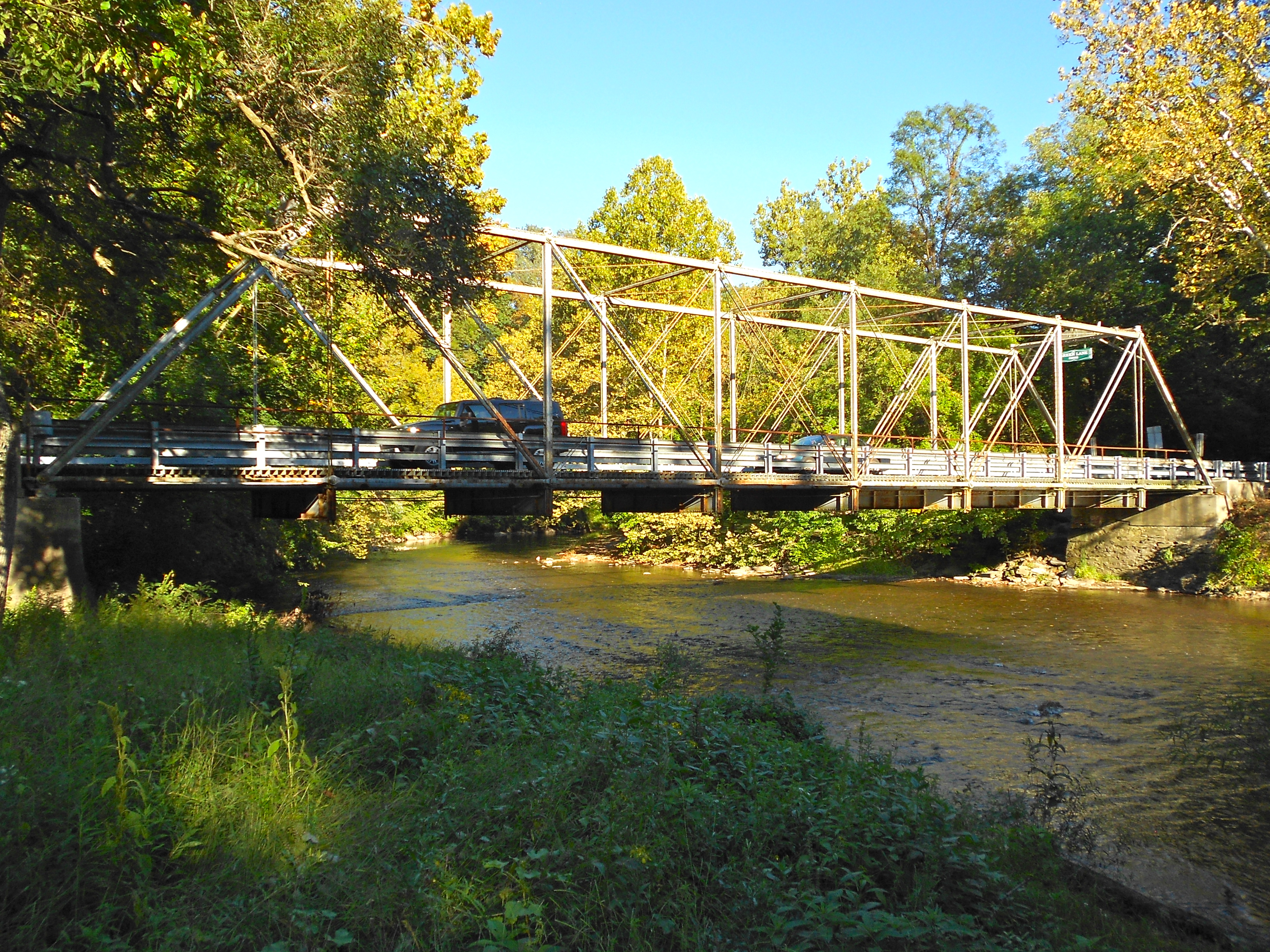
- Etters Bridge, spanning Yellow Breeches Creek
- Motto: "A Township of the First Class"
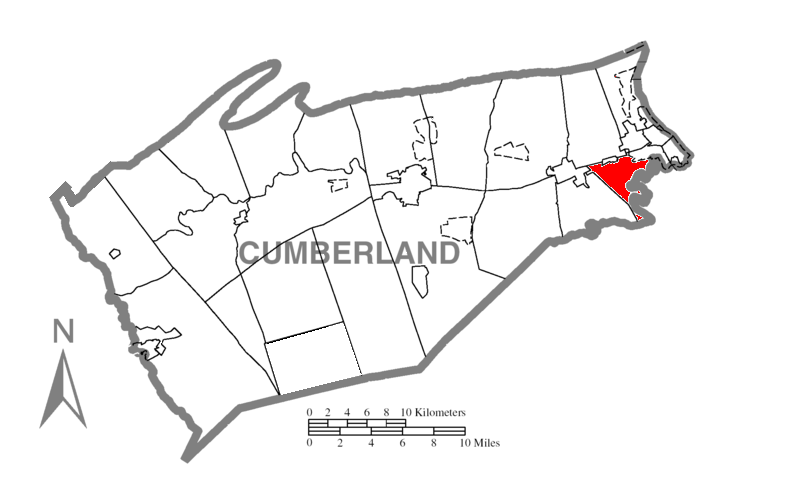
- Map of Cumberland County, Pennsylvania highlighting Lower Allen Township

- Map of Cumberland County, Pennsylvania
- Country: United States
- State: Pennsylvania
- County: Cumberland

Government
  - Type: Board of Supervisors

Area
  - Total: 10.33 sq mi (26.75 km^{2})
  - Land: 10.13 sq mi (26.23 km^{2})
  - Water: 0.20 sq mi (0.52 km^{2})

Population (2010)
  - Total: 17,980
  - Estimate (2016): 19,366
  - Density: 1,912.2/sq mi (738.32/km^{2})
- Time zone: UTC-5 (Eastern (EST))
  - Summer (DST): UTC-4 (EDT)
- Area code: 717
- FIPS code: 42-041-44832
- Website: www.latwp.org

Historical population
Census	Pop.	Note	%±
2000	17,437		—
2010	17,980		3.1%
2016 (est.)	19,366		7.7%
U.S. Decennial Census

Lower Allen Township is a township in Cumberland County, Pennsylvania, United States. The population was 17,980 at the 2010 census.

The township has State Correctional Institution – Camp Hill, and it formerly had the headquarters of the Pennsylvania Department of Corrections.

== History ==
The Etters Bridge was added to the National Register of Historic Places in 1986.

== Geography ==
The township is near the southeastern corner of Cumberland County, bordered to the southeast by Yellow Breeches Creek, a tributary of the Susquehanna River. The creek forms the boundary with York County. The township is bordered to the east by the borough of New Cumberland, to the north by the boroughs of Lemoyne and Camp Hill, Hampden Township, and the borough of Shiremanstown, to the northwest by the borough of Mechanicsburg, and to the west by Upper Allen Township.

According to the United States Census Bureau, the township has a total area of 10.3 square miles (26.8 km^{2}), of which 10.1 square miles (26.2 km^{2}) is land and 0.2 square miles (0.5 km^{2}), or 1.96%, is water.

Interstate 83 runs along the eastern edge of the township, with access from Exits 40B (Carlisle Road) and 41A (Lowther Road). The Harrisburg Capital Beltway runs along the northern border of the township or just north of it, and the U.S. Route 15 freeway crosses the northwest part of the township, with access from three exits (Rossmoyne Road, Slate Hill Road, and Lower Allen Drive at the Capital City Mall). Interstate 76, the Pennsylvania Turnpike, crosses the center of the township, with the closest access to the west in Upper Allen Township, where the turnpike crosses US 15 at Exit 236.

unincorporated communities in the township:

- Lower Allen
- Lisburn

== Demographics ==
As of the census of 2000, there were 17,437 people, 6,314 households, and 3,801 families residing in the township. The population density was 1,695.1 inhabitants per square mile (654.5/km^{2}). There were 6,520 housing units at an average density of 633.8 units per square mile (244.7 units/km^{2}). The racial makeup of the township was 85.71% White, 10.83% African American, 0.13% Native American, 1.89% Asian, 0.06% Pacific Islander, 0.60% from other races, and 0.77% from two or more races. Hispanic or Latino of any race were 3.68% of the population.

There were 6,314 households, out of which 23.2% had children under the age of 18 living with them, 50.2% were married couples living together, 7.8% had a female householder with no husband present, and 39.8% were non-families. 34.3% of all households were made up of individuals, and 16.4% had someone living alone who was 65 years of age or older. The average household size was 2.14 and the average family size was 2.76.

In the township the population was spread out, with 15.4% under the age of 18, 10.0% from 18 to 24, 33.5% from 25 to 44, 21.5% from 45 to 64, and 19.6% who were 65 years of age or older. The median age was 40 years. For every 100 females there were 127.4 males. For every 100 females age 18 and over, there were 131.6 males.

The median income for a household in the township was $46,172, and the median income for a family was $57,973. Males had a median income of $38,013 versus $29,798 for females. The per capita income for the township was $24,735. About 4.5% of families and 6.5% of the population were below the poverty line, including 7.9% of those under age 18 and 4.8% of those age 65 or over.

== Education ==
The school district is West Shore School District. Cedar Cliff High School is in the township.

Other schools in Lower Allen Township:

- Trinity High School
- Al-Huda School
- Cumberland Perry Area Career and Technical Center
