= Lemoyne, Pennsylvania =

Borough in Pennsylvania, US

Lemoyne, Pennsylvania Bridgeport
- Borough
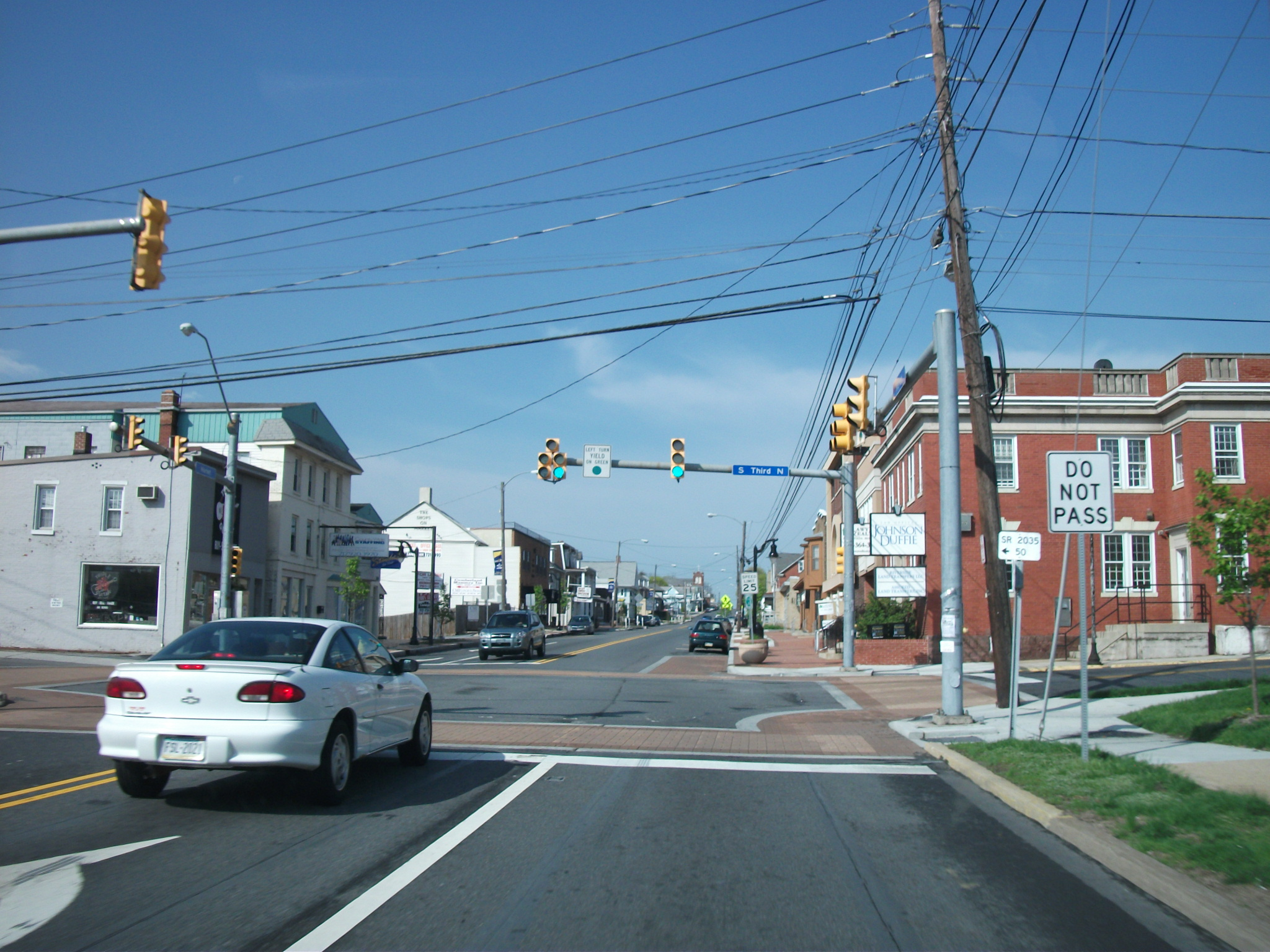
- Intersection of Market and 3rd St, 2011
- Motto: "The little town that has it all!"
- Interactive map of Lemoyne, Pennsylvania
- Coordinates: 40°14′39″N 76°53′56″W
- Country: United States
- State: Pennsylvania
- County: Cumberland
- Settled (as Bridgeport): 1835
- Settled (as Riverton): 1888
- Incorporated: May 23, 1905
- Named for: French soldier Charles LeMoyne

Government
  - Type: Council–manager
  - Mayor: Matthew Salkowski
  - Borough Manager: Amanda Seibert
  - Council President: Gale Gallo
  - Council Vice President: Sue Yenchko
  - Council Member: List of Council Members: Rebecca Coleman; Joe Gargiulo; Mike Kostukovich; Gene Koontz; Jesse Monoski

Area
  - Total: 1.61 sq mi (4.18 km^{2})
  - Land: 1.61 sq mi (4.18 km^{2})
  - Water: 0 sq mi (0.00 km^{2})
- Elevation: 384 ft (117 m)

Population (2020)
  - Total: 4,659
  - Density: 2,890.0/sq mi (1,115.84/km^{2})
- Time zone: UTC−05:00 (EST)
  - Summer (DST): UTC−04:00 (EDT)
- ZIP Code: 17043
- Area codes: 717 and 223
- FIPS code: 42-42648
- Website: www.lemoynepa.com

Lemoyne is a borough in Cumberland County, Pennsylvania, United States, which lies across the Susquehanna River from Harrisburg, Pennsylvania's capital. It is part of the Harrisburg–Carlisle metropolitan statistical area. Lemoyne was incorporated as a borough on May 23, 1905. As of the 2020 census, the borough population was 4,659. Lemoyne is served by Interstate 83 and U.S. Routes 11/15. Lemoyne is a part of the West Shore School District.

== Name ==
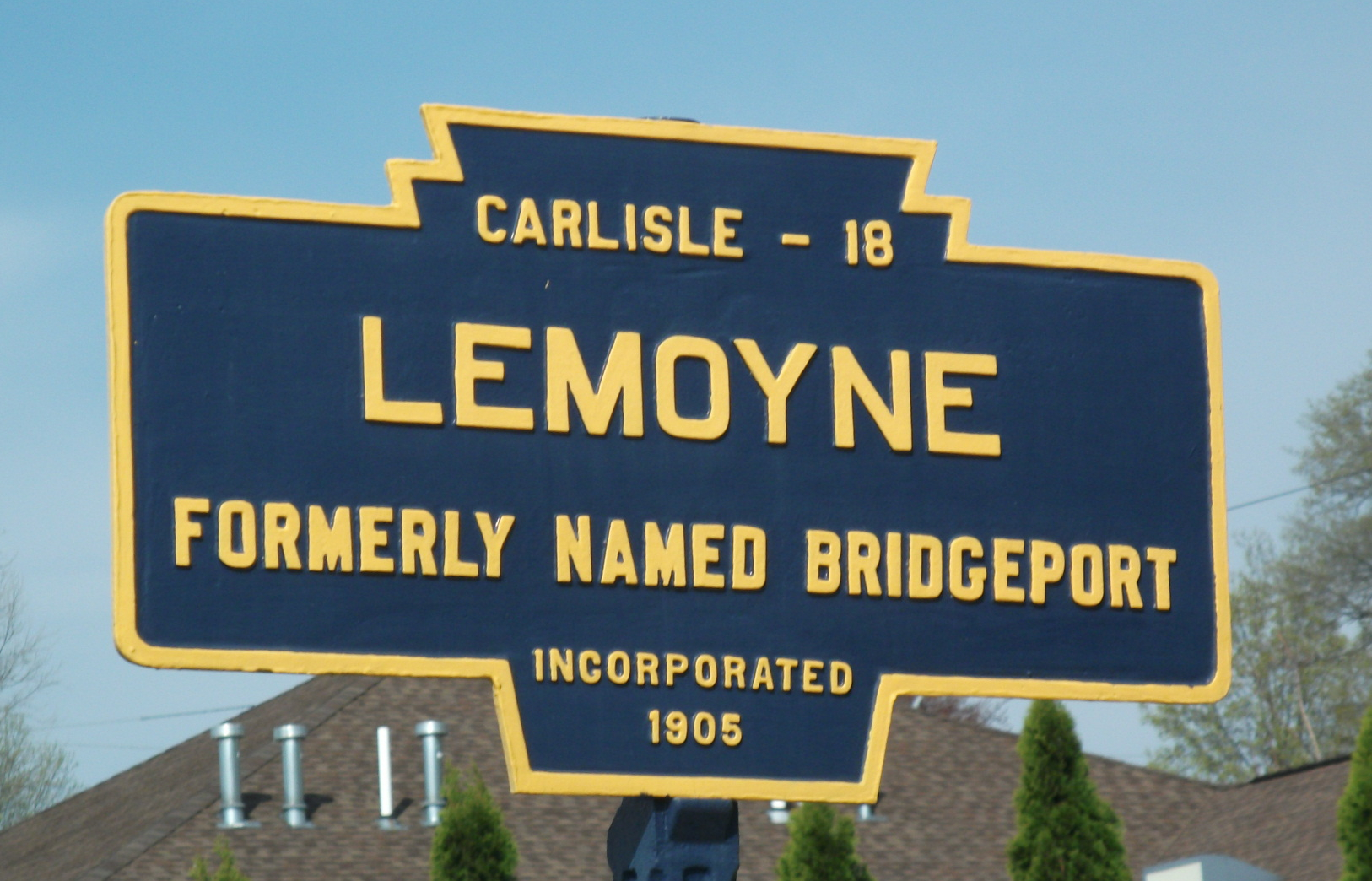
Keystone Marker

Following the 1724 stone house built by John Harris and John Kelso, the emerging settlement was first named by Thomas Penn as the "Manor of Lowther" in 1750. Once the camelback bridge was completed in 1815, the town became "Bridgeport". In 1888, the name was then changed to "Riverton"; once the population of 800 was reached, which was needed to obtain a Post Office, it was denied out of possible confusion for Riverton, Virginia. Therefore, in 1905 it was finally renamed "Lemoyne", said to be in honor of Charles le Moyne, a French soldier who supposedly settled near Harrisburg following an Ohio expedition. Another possible theory was that it was named in honor of Dr. Francis J. LeMoyne.

== Geography ==
Lemoyne is located on the eastern edge of Cumberland County at 40°14′39″N 76°53′56″W (40.244217, -76.899119), on the west bank of the Susquehanna River, directly across from Harrisburg. It is bordered to the north by Wormleysburg, to the west by Camp Hill, and to the south by the borough of New Cumberland and Lower Allen Township.

According to the United States Census Bureau, the borough has a total area of 1.612 square miles (4.18 km^{2}), all land.

== Demographics ==
Historical population
Census	Pop.	Note	%±
1910	1,393		—
1920	1,939		39.2%
1930	4,171		115.1%
1940	4,358		4.5%
1950	4,605		5.7%
1960	4,662		1.2%
1970	4,625		−0.8%
1980	4,178		−9.7%
1990	3,959		−5.2%
2000	3,995		0.9%
2010	4,553		14.0%
2020	4,659		2.3%
U.S. Decennial Census

=== 2020 census ===
As of the 2020 census, Lemoyne had a population of 4,659. The median age was 40.5 years. 19.1% of residents were under the age of 18 and 18.2% of residents were 65 years of age or older. For every 100 females there were 97.7 males, and for every 100 females age 18 and over there were 96.8 males age 18 and over.

100.0% of residents lived in urban areas, while 0.0% lived in rural areas.

There were 2,178 households in Lemoyne, of which 23.8% had children under the age of 18 living in them. Of all households, 35.8% were married-couple households, 24.4% were households with a male householder and no spouse or partner present, and 30.9% were households with a female householder and no spouse or partner present. About 40.1% of all households were made up of individuals and 14.3% had someone living alone who was 65 years of age or older.

There were 2,331 housing units, of which 6.6% were vacant. The homeowner vacancy rate was 1.0% and the rental vacancy rate was 6.5%.

Racial composition as of the 2020 census
Race	Number	Percent
White	3,782	81.2%
Black or African American	211	4.5%
American Indian and Alaska Native	19	0.4%
Asian	120	2.6%
Native Hawaiian and Other Pacific Islander	2	0.0%
Some other race	158	3.4%
Two or more races	367	7.9%
Hispanic or Latino (of any race)	356	7.6%

=== 2010 census ===
As of the 2010 Census, there were 4,553 people, with a population density of 2,824.4/sq mi (1,090.5/km^{2}) in the borough. There were 2,363 housing units at an average density of 1,465.3/sq mi (565.74/km^{2}).

==== Age and gender ====
The median age was 38.3 years, with 264 (5.8%) under the age of 5, 628 (13.8%) in the 5 to 17 age range, 121 (2.7%) in the 18 to 20 age range, 253 (5.6%) in the 21 to 24 age range, 806 (17.7%) in the 25 to 34 age range, 605 (13.3%) in the 35 to 44 age range, 664 (14.6%) in the 45 to 54 age range, 325 (7.1%) in the 55 to 59 age range, 282 (6.2%) in the 60 to 64 age range, 273 (6%) in the 65 to 74 age range, 206 (4.5%) in the 75 to 84 age range, and 126 (2.8%) age 85 and over. 892 (19.6%) were under the age 18 and 605 (13.3%) were age 65 and over. 2,323 (51%) of the population were females, giving a ratio of 100∶96.0 females to males. 1,876 (51.2%) of those over the age of 18 were female with 360 (59.5%) of those age 65 and over being female.

==== Race and Hispanic or Latino origin ====
The racial and ethnic makeup of the borough was 4,114 (90.36%) white, 118 (2.59%) African American or Black, 12 (0.26%) American Indian or Alaska Native, 72 (1.58%) Asian, 1 (0.02%) Native Hawaiian and other Pacific Islander, 100 (2.2%) from some other race, and 136 (2.99%) from two or more races. 232 (5.1%) were Hispanic or Latino of any race.

==== Households and families ====
There were 2,160 households, with 1,706 (79%) being considered families. The average size of a household was 2.11 and of families 2.85. 44% of the families had children under the age of 18. 764 (71%) of the families were a husband-wife family, 38% of those having children under the age of 18. 228 (21.2%) of families had a female householder with no husband present, 58% of those having children under the age of 18. 84 (7.8%) of families were of some other classification. There were 1,084 (50.2%) households not considered a family, with 850 (78.4%) of those being someone living alone 239 (28.1%) being age 65 and over.

== Notable people ==
- Coy Wire, sport anchor
- Bob Adams, baseball pitcher
- Edson Hendricks, computer scientist
- Stan Jones, football player
- Kadida Kenner, founder and CEO of the New Pennsylvania Project
- Paul Minner, baseball pitcher
- Bob Moorhead, baseball pitcher
- Andy Musser, sports announcer
- Dean T. Stevenson, Episcopal bishop
- Helen Waddell, baseball player
