= Capital City Mall =

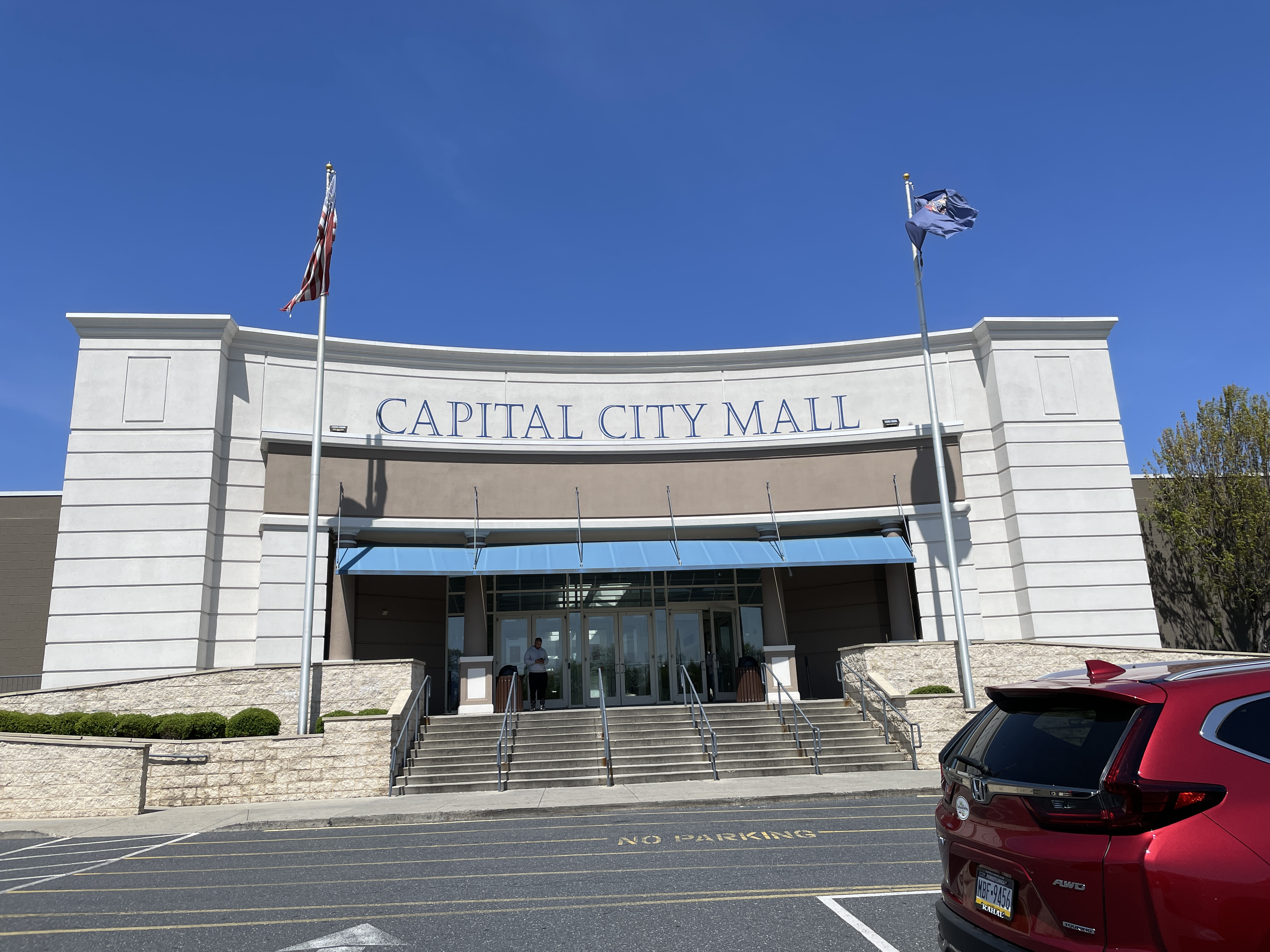
- Southeast entrance of Capital City Mall
- Location: Camp Hill, Pennsylvania, United States
- Coordinates: 40.223°N 76.933°W
- Address: 3506 Capital City Mall Drive
- Opened: October 24, 1974
- Developer: Crown American Corporation
- Owner: PREIT Realty
- Num. of stores: 80+
- Num. of anchor tenants: 4
- Floor area: 608,911 square feet (56,569.7 m^{2})
- Floors: 1
- Public transit: CAT bus: D
- Website: shopcapitalcitymall.com

Capital City Mall is a 608,911-square-foot (56,569.7 m^{2}) regional shopping mall located approximately 5 miles (8.0 km) southwest of Harrisburg in Lower Allen Township, Pennsylvania. It is one of three enclosed malls in the immediate Harrisburg area, and is the only enclosed mall in Harrisburg's western suburbs. The anchor stores are Dick's Sporting Goods, JCPenney, Macy's, Sportsman's Warehouse, Dave & Buster's, and H&M. The mall is owned and operated by PREIT Realty.

== History ==
Capital City Mall was developed by Crown American Corporation, Johnstown, PA and opened in 1974 with Bowman's, Murphy's Mart and Sears as its anchors, as well as a movie theater. Bowman's was a locally based department store and closed in 1979. Their location was expanded and became the Harrisburg area's first Hess's later that year. In 1985, more changes came to the mall. G.C. Murphy closed and the Garden Grove food court was added to the center of the mall. In August 1987, the vacant G.C. Murphy store was reopened as Ames. Later, Hess's was sold to May Department Stores in 1995 and they reopened the store into a Hecht's, which opened that fall. Ames closed their store in 1995. From 1996-1999, the mall was renovated, with the former Ames being expanded and reopening as a JCPenney in November 1995, and Sears completing an expansion and interior renovation in 1999. More changes came in 2005 when Hecht's was converted to Macy's, and the Garden Grove food court (now simply called the food court) relocated to the location of the former United Artists movie theater.

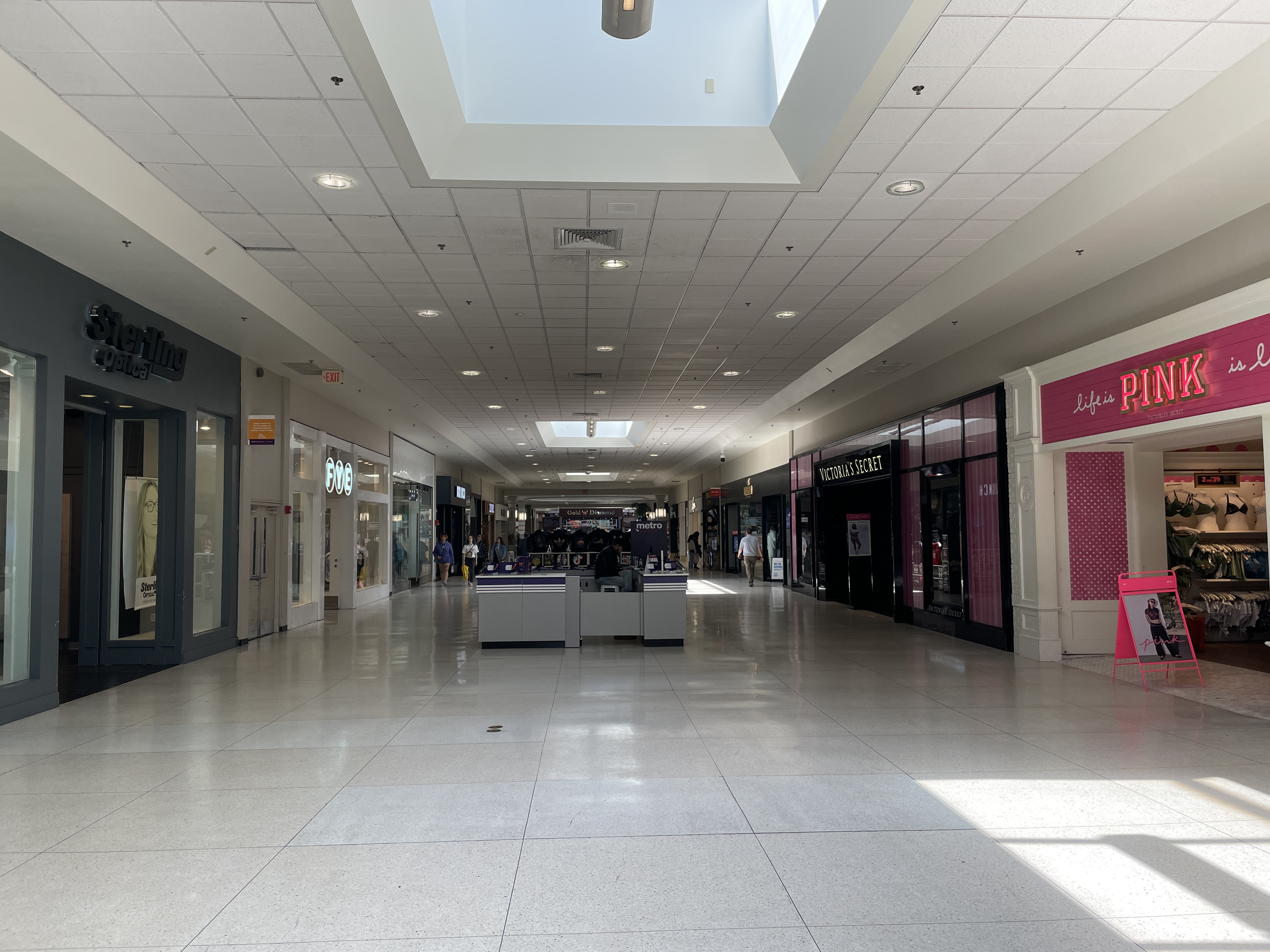
Capital City Mall from JCPenney

An extensive redevelopment project was completed in 2006, which relocated and expanded the food court. This gave the mall an additional 30,000 sq ft (2,800 m^{2}). of retail space, with 2 full service dining options (Davenport's Italian Oven and Garfield's) added as well. In 2011 the Davenport's Italian Oven closed and the space was converted into a DSW store in March 2013. The Garfield's restaurant also closed in 2013, with Hand & Stone Massage and Facial Spa replacing it in November 2015. The freestanding Toys "R" Us in the rear parking lot relocated to the Carlisle Pike about 5 miles away and its building was demolished in early 2015. The outdoor enthusiast store Field & Stream, become the freestanding anchor, opened in 2015.

On January 4, 2017, Sears announced their store would close by mid-February and was demolished by March 2017 to make way for multiple stores, including Dick's Sporting Goods, Fine Wine & Good Spirits and a smaller Sears Appliances & Mattress store, as part of a mall makeover by PREIT. Dave & Buster's announced they would take over the Old Navy space, which closed on December 26, on the JCPenney side of the mall and open in the fall 2018. In October 2019, the Field & Stream store was replaced by Sportsman's Warehouse as part of an acquisition of eight Field & Stream stores by Sportsman's Warehouse.
