= National Register of Historic Places listings in Cumberland County, Pennsylvania =

Location of Cumberland County in Pennsylvania

This is a list of the National Register of Historic Places listings in Cumberland County, Pennsylvania.

This is intended to be a complete list of the properties and districts on the National Register of Historic Places in Cumberland County, Pennsylvania. The locations of National Register properties and districts for which the latitude and longitude coordinates are included below may be seen in a map.

There are 36 properties and districts listed on the National Register in the county. Two sites are further designated as National Historic Landmarks.

This National Park Service list is complete through NPS recent listings posted September 26, 2025.

== Current listings ==
| | Name on the Register | Image | Date listed | Location | City or town | Description |
|---|---|---|---|---|---|---|
| 1 | William Black Homestead | William Black Homestead | July 20, 1977 (#77001159) | Drexel Hill Park Road; 40°13′20″N 76°53′03″W | New Cumberland | |
| 2 | Benjamin Blythe Homestead | Benjamin Blythe Homestead | September 15, 1977 (#77001160) | 217 Means Hollow Road; 40°02′03″N 77°30′43″W | Shippensburg | |
| 3 | Boiling Springs Historic District | Boiling Springs Historic District | December 3, 1984 (#84000566) | Roughly bounded by High and First Streets, Boiling Springs Lake, and Yellow Breeches Creek; 40°08′54″N 77°07′40″W | Boiling Springs | |
| 4 | Carlisle Armory | Carlisle Armory | December 22, 1989 (#89002071) | 504 Cavalry Road; 40°13′13″N 77°10′43″W | Carlisle | |
| 5 | Carlisle Historic District | Carlisle Historic District | June 15, 1979 (#79002214) | Roughly bounded by Penn, East, Walnut and College Streets; 40°12′08″N 77°11′04″W | Carlisle | |
| 6 | Carlisle Indian School | Carlisle Indian School | October 15, 1966 (#66000658) | East edge of Carlisle on U.S. Route 11; 40°12′32″N 77°10′41″W | Carlisle | |
| 7 | Cumberland Valley Railroad Station and Station Master's House | Cumberland Valley Railroad Station and Station Master's House | November 17, 1978 (#78002384) | 2 West Strawberry Alley and 4 West Strawberry Alley; 40°12′49″N 77°00′32″W | Mechanicsburg | |
| 8 | Cumberland Valley State Normal School Historic District | Cumberland Valley State Normal School Historic District | January 11, 1985 (#85000076) | Roughly bounded by North Prince Street, Stewart, Old Main, Gilbert and Henderson Drives; 40°03′30″N 77°31′22″W | Shippensburg | |
| 9 | Dykeman's Spring | Dykeman's Spring | May 27, 1999 (#99000645) | Dykeman Road, 0.25 miles (0.40 km) east of PA 696; 40°02′33″N 77°30′57″W | Shippensburg | |
| 10 | Johannes Eberly House | Johannes Eberly House | April 2, 1973 (#73001619) | Northeast of Mechanicsburg on U.S. Route 11; 40°14′25″N 76°58′41″W | Hampden Township | |
| 11 | Etters Bridge | Etters Bridge | February 27, 1986 (#86000308) | Green Lane Drive and Yellow Breeches Creek; 40°13′28″N 76°53′53″W | Lower Allen Township | Extends into York County |
| 12 | Gilbert Bridge | Gilbert Bridge | May 5, 1989 (#89000355) | Bishop Road / Gilbert Road over Yellow Breeches Creek; 40°09′13″N 76°58′57″W | Grantham | Extends into York County |
| 13 | James Given Tavern | James Given Tavern | July 24, 1992 (#92000943) | 1189 Walnut Bottom Road; 40°10′51″N 77°13′11″W | South Middleton Township | |
| 14 | Amelia S. Givin Free Library | Amelia S. Givin Free Library | August 11, 2004 (#04000841) | 114 North Baltimore Avenue; 40°06′59″N 77°11′21″W | Mount Holly Springs | |
| 15 | Heishman Mill | Heishman Mill | March 31, 2022 (#100007548) | 1215 Creek Rd. 40°12′48″N 77°18′59″W | West Pennsboro Township | |
| 16 | Hessian Powder Magazine | Hessian Powder Magazine | May 17, 1974 (#74001778) | Guardhouse and Garrison Lanes; 40°11′52″N 77°10′42″W | Carlisle | |
| 17 | Irving Female College | Irving Female College | May 6, 1983 (#83002231) | Filbert, Main, and Simpson Streets; 40°12′51″N 76°59′59″W | Mechanicsburg | |
| 18 | Locust Grove Cemetery | | December 21, 2021 (#100005291) | 111-119 North Queen St. 40°03′23″N 77°30′54″W | Shippensburg | |
| 19 | Market Street Bridge | Market Street Bridge | June 22, 1988 (#88000759) | Market Street/LR 34 over Susquehanna River; 40°15′27″N 76°53′00″W | Wormleysburg | Extends into Dauphin County |
| 20 | Mechanicsburg Commercial Historic District | Mechanicsburg Commercial Historic District | April 21, 1983 (#83002232) | Main Street from Arch to High Street; 40°12′46″N 77°00′33″W | Mechanicsburg | |
| 21 | Melester Barn | Melester Barn | February 3, 2020 (#100004931) | 1110 South Spring Garden St. 40°10′27″N 77°10′40″W | South Middleton Township | |
| 22 | Mount Tabor AME Zion Church and Cemetery | Mount Tabor AME Zion Church and Cemetery | February 19, 2021 (#100005377) | Cedar St. 40°07′05″N 77°10′40″W | Mount Holly Springs | The cemetery is located nearby on Cedar Street. There are two separate locations. |
| 23 | Newville Historic District | Newville Historic District | June 28, 2010 (#10000397) | Roughly bounded by Cove Alley, Big Spring Creek, the Cumberland Valley Railroad right-of-way, Washington St. 40°10′23″N 77°23′55″W | Newville | |
| 24 | Old West, Dickinson College | Old West, Dickinson College | October 15, 1966 (#66000659) | Dickinson College campus 40°12′09″N 77°11′45″W | Carlisle | |
| 25 | Adam Orris House | Adam Orris House | December 30, 1987 (#87002206) | 318 West Main Street; 40°12′42″N 77°00′51″W | Mechanicsburg | |
| 26 | Peace Church | Peace Church | March 24, 1972 (#72001114) | Northwestern corner of Trindle and St. John's Roads; 40°13′54″N 76°57′25″W | Camp Hill | |
| 27 | Pine Grove Iron Works | Pine Grove Iron Works | April 13, 1977 (#77001158) | South of Dickinson on Pennsylvania Route 233; 40°01′47″N 77°18′15″W | Dickinson Township | Also known as Pine Grove Furnace. Site includes the ironmaster's mansion and the former grist mill, now used as the Appalachian Trail Museum. |
| 28 | Ramp Covered Bridge | Ramp Covered Bridge | August 25, 1980 (#80003480) | East of Newburg on Township 374; 40°08′10″N 77°31′26″W | Hopewell Township | |
| 29 | Shippen House | Shippen House | November 25, 1975 (#75001636) | 52 West King Street; 40°02′59″N 77°31′18″W | Shippensburg | |
| 30 | Shippensburg Historic District | Shippensburg Historic District | June 7, 1984 (#84003346) | Roughly bounded by Lutz Avenue, Kenneth, Spring, and Fort Streets; 40°03′08″N 77°31′11″W | Shippensburg | |
| 31 | Simpson Street School | Simpson Street School | February 24, 1983 (#83002233) | Simpson and High Streets; 40°12′39″N 77°00′39″W | Mechanicsburg | |
| 32 | George Trimble House | George Trimble House | July 24, 1992 (#92000945) | 50 Pleasant Grove Road; 40°16′11″N 77°02′55″W | Silver Spring Township | |
| 33 | Union Hotel | Union Hotel | May 5, 1989 (#89000362) | 240 Old Gettysburg Road; 40°10′41″N 76°59′30″W | Shepherdstown | |
| 34 | Widow Piper's Tavern | Widow Piper's Tavern | January 17, 1974 (#74001779) | Southwestern corner of King and Queen Streets; 40°03′16″N 77°30′48″W | Shippensburg | |
| 35 | John Williams House | John Williams House | July 28, 1977 (#77001161) | 1554 Williams Grove Rd., 0.5 miles (0.80 km) south of Williams Grove; 40°08′52″N 77°01′49″W | Williams Grove | |
| 36 | John Wormley House | John Wormley House | November 21, 1976 (#76001630) | 126 North Front Street; 40°15′23″N 76°54′03″W | Wormleysburg | |

== Former listings ==
| | Name on the Register | Image | Date listed | Date removed | Location | City or town | Description |
|---|---|---|---|---|---|---|---|
| 1 | John McCullough House | | December 20, 1978 (#78002385) | June 25, 2013 | Southeast of Newville on Pennsylvania Route 233; 40°09′29″N 77°23′03″W | West Pennsboro Township | Demolished |
| 2 | Sterrett-Hassinger House | Sterrett-Hassinger House | September 15, 1983 (#83002234) | January 20, 2000 | Three Squares Hollow Road | Upper Mifflin Township | Destroyed by fire on January 22, 1988. |

== See also ==
- List of National Historic Landmarks in Pennsylvania
- National Register of Historic Places listings in Pennsylvania
- List of Pennsylvania state historical markers in Cumberland County
