= Carlisle Historic District =

Carlisle Historic District may refer to:

- Carlisle Historic District (Carlisle, Kentucky), listed on the National Register of Historic Places in Nicholas County, Kentucky
- Carlisle Historic District (Carlisle, Pennsylvania), listed on the National Register of Historic Places in Cumberland County, Pennsylvania
