= Shepherdstown =

Shepherdstown is the name of some places in the United States of America:

- Shepherdstown, Ohio, in Wheeling Township, Belmont County
- Shepherdstown, Pennsylvania
- Shepherdstown, West Virginia
