= Old West, Dickinson College =

- U.S. National Register of Historic Places
- U.S. National Historic Landmark
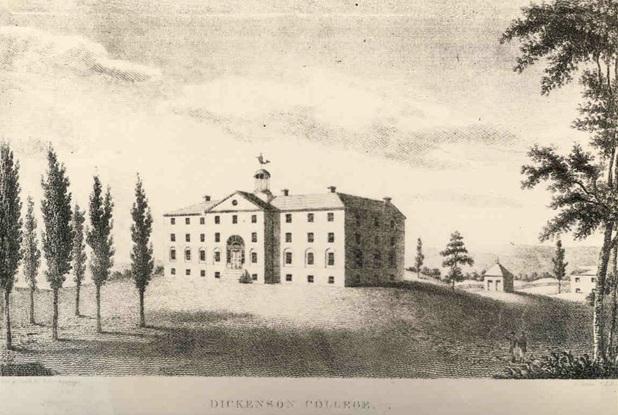
- Old West

- Location within Pennsylvania Location within the United States
- Location: Carlisle, Pennsylvania
- Coordinates: 40°12′11″N 77°11′43″W
- Built: 1822
- Architect: Benjamin Henry Latrobe
- Architectural style: Federal
- NRHP reference No.: 66000659

Significant dates
- Added to NRHP: October 15, 1966
- Designated NHL: June 13, 1962

Old West was the first building to be erected on the campus of Dickinson College in Carlisle, Pennsylvania. It was designed by Benjamin Henry Latrobe in 1803, completed in 1822, and is a fine example of Federal period architecture.

It was designated as a National Historic Landmark in 1962 for its architecture and its association with Latrobe.

== History ==
The construction of Old West, known then as New College, was authorized and began in 1798. The effort was in response to the complaints that students could not live at the College. On June 20, 1799, the first cornerstone was laid by John Keen of Carpenters Co., Philadelphia.

During construction in 1803, however, the brick portion of West College burnt down. In an attempt to rebuild a building that would be compatible with that of Princeton University, Judge Brackenridge went to Philadelphia to consult Benjamin Latrobe, who had remodeled Princeton's Nassau Hall and had completed extensive design work on the Capitol Building in Washington, D.C.

Latrobe was a willing contributor to the new design of West College. In a letter dated May 18, 1803, a copy of which may be seen in the Dickinson archives, Benjamin Henry Latrobe replies to Judge Brackenridge's request for drawings in great detail. Latrobe addresses the aspect of weather in Carlisle because of the extreme temperatures and amounts of moisture it acquires annually in the winter months. He explains that his design of the building allows for optimum light absorption through the windows and explains that the stone provides adequate shielding from the strong, crisp wind.

The attention to stone as a weather-proof material was to have a lasting effect.

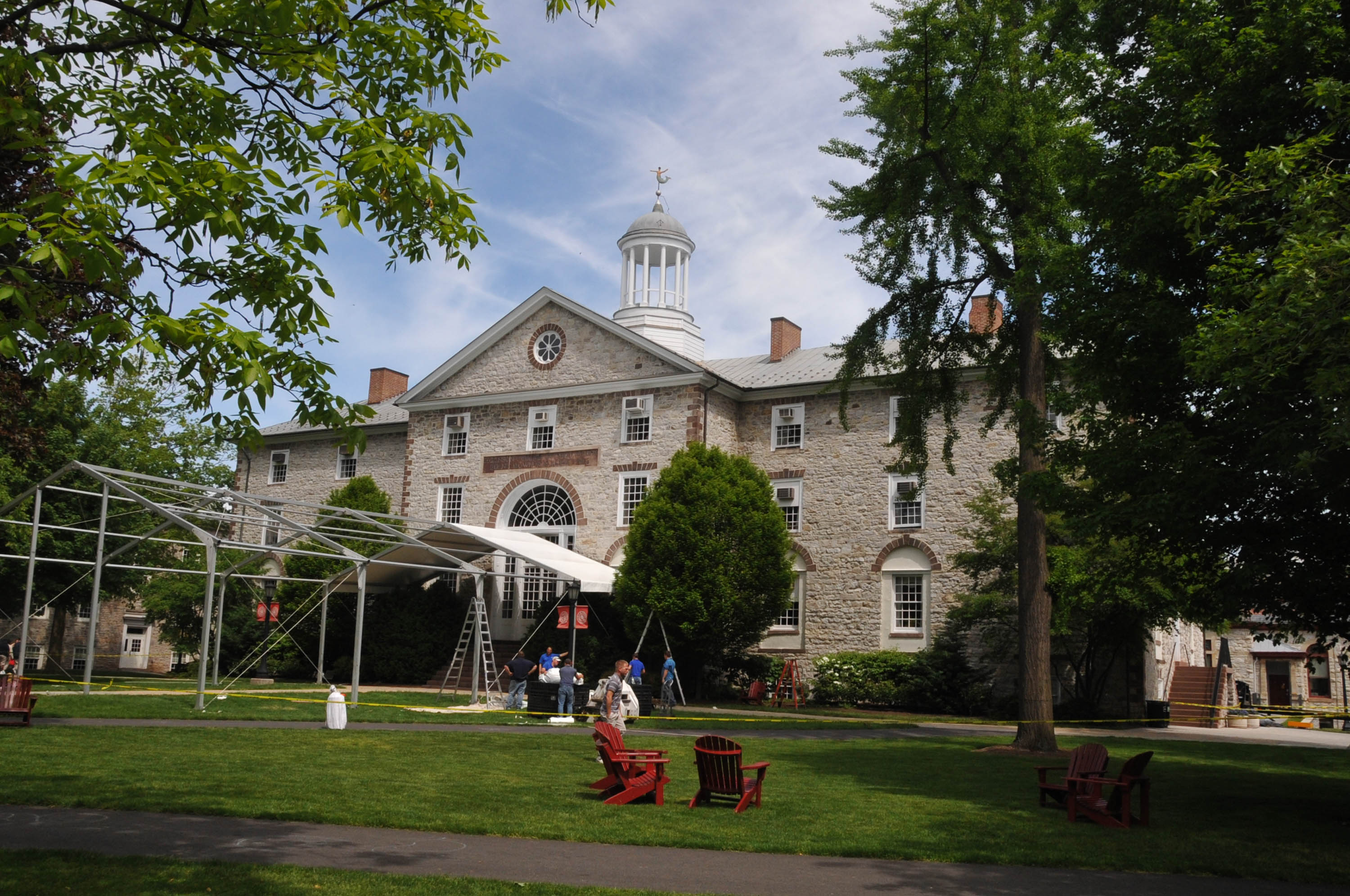
Old West in 2011

Today, Old West houses the presidential and other administrative offices. Memorial Hall in particular is the home of various distinguished speakers, cultural symposiums, and mass every Sunday night.

It was declared a National Historic Landmark in 1962.

== See also ==
- List of National Historic Landmarks in Pennsylvania
- National Register of Historic Places in Cumberland County, Pennsylvania
