= Carlisle Airport (Pennsylvania) =

- IATA: N94; ICAO: None; FAA LID: N94

Summary
- Airport type: Public use
- Owner: South Middleton Township
- Serves: Carlisle, Pennsylvania
- Elevation AMSL: 510 ft (160 m)
- Coordinates: 40°11′16″N 077°10′27″W
- Website: www.cumberlandvalleyaviation.com/

Map
- Location of airport in Pennsylvania N94 (the United States)

Runways
Direction	Length		Surface
Direction	ft	m	Surface
10/28	4,008	1,222	Asphalt

Statistics (2015)
- Aircraft operations: 24,500
- Based aircraft: 60
- Source: Federal Aviation Administration

Carlisle Airport (Pennsylvania) (IATA: N94, ICAO: None, FAA LID: N94) is a publicly-owned, public use airport located one nautical miles (two mi, three km) southeast of the central business district of Carlisle, a city in Cumberland County, Pennsylvania, United States. This airport is owned and operated by South Middleton Township, Cumberland County, Pennsylvania.

== Facilities and aircraft ==
Carlisle Airport covers an area of 114 acres (46 ha) at an elevation of 510 feet (155 m) above mean sea level. It has one runway designated 10/28 with an asphalt surface measuring 4,008 by 60 feet (1,222 x 18 m). The airport has several instrument approaches, including a GPS approach to each runway.

For the 12-month period ending August 28, 2015, the airport had 24,500 aircraft operations, an average of 67 per day: 94% general aviation, 2% air taxi, and 4% military. At that time there were 60 aircraft based at this airport: 83% single-engine, 9% multi-engine, 7% helicopter, and 1% jet.

In September 2021, the Airport was purchased by South Middleton Township. The Township has announced nearly $7.6 million in new enhancements at the Airport, to include constructing new corporate aircraft hangars, a medevac hangar, new terminal building, parallel taxiway, and other improvements. The goal is to have the projects completed by 2025.

== Accidents and incidents ==
On August 19, 2026, a Cessna 150 struck a Pennsylvania State Police Bell 407 while landing at the airport, reportedly after the Cessna veered off-course. The Cessna pilot was killed and two state troopers in the helicopter were injured.

== See also ==
- List of airports in Pennsylvania
