= List of Pennsylvania state historical markers in Cumberland County =

Location of Cumberland County in Pennsylvania

This is a list of the Pennsylvania state historical markers in Cumberland County.

This is intended to be a complete list of the official state historical markers placed in Cumberland County, Pennsylvania by the Pennsylvania Historical and Museum Commission (PHMC). The locations of the historical markers, as well as the latitude and longitude coordinates as provided by the PHMC's database, are included below when available. There are 71 historical markers located in Cumberland County.

== Historical markers ==
Marker title	Image	Date dedicated	Location	Marker type	Topics
Bethel A.M.E. Church		May 9, 2009	131 E Pomfret St., Carlisle	City	African American, Religion, Underground Railroad
Big Spring Presbyterian Church		August 18, 1985	S. Corporation St. at church, Newville; 40.17272°N 77.39736°W	Roadside	Religion
Blaine House		December 6, 1949	S. Hanover St. between Pomfret & High Sts., Carlisle; 40.20075°N 77.18907°W	City	American Revolution, George Washington, Military, Whiskey Rebellion
Braddock Expedition		November 3, 1961	US 11 (W. King St.), Shippensburg; 40.04797°N 77.52655°W	Roadside	French & Indian War, Military
Carlisle		July 30, 1947	Near Walnut Bottom Rd. & Washington St. intersection, at Thornwall Park entrance, Carlisle; 40.19357°N 77.19817°W	Roadside	Cities & Towns, Early Settlement, Military, Whiskey Rebellion
Carlisle		July 30, 1947	US 11N, east of Carlisle; 40.21144°N 77.18074°W	Roadside	American Revolution, Cities & Towns, Early Settlement, Government & Politics, Whiskey Rebellion
Carlisle		July 30, 1947	U.S. 11 W of Carlisle; 40.20167°N 77.21158°W	Roadside	American Revolution, Cities & Towns, Government & Politics, Whiskey Rebellion
Carlisle		July 30, 1947	PA 34 S of Carlisle, between Noble Blvd. & W Ridge St. 40.19227°N 77.19037°W	Roadside	American Revolution, Cities & Towns, Government & Politics, Whiskey Rebellion
Carlisle		July 30, 1947	PA 34 N of Carlisle, at PA Turnpike overpass 40.22017°N 77.18666°W	Roadside	Cities & Towns
Carlisle Barracks		n/a	U.S. 11 opposite War College, NE end Carlisle; 40.21258°N 77.17875°W	Roadside	American Revolution, Military, Native American
Carlisle Fort		November 3, 1961	W. High St. between Pitt & Hanover Sts., Carlisle; 40.20156°N 77.19075°W	City	American Revolution, Military
Carlisle Indian Industrial School		August 31, 2003	North side of Claremont Road, 50 feet East of the Carlisle Barracks entrance 40.20754°N 77.17075°W	Roadside	Education, Native American
Carlisle Iron Works		August 4, 1947	PA 174 just E of Boiling Springs; 40.15061°N 77.12449°W	Roadside	Business & Industry, Coal, Furnaces, Iron
Charles Albert "Chief" Bender		October 17, 2003	Indian Field, Carlisle Barracks, off U.S. 11, Carlisle; 40.20907°N 77.17532°W	Roadside	Baseball, Education, Native American, Sports
Cumberland County		May 17, 1982	Old Courthouse, High & Hanover Sts., Carlisle; 40.20129°N 77.1894°W	City	Government & Politics, Government & Politics 18th Century, Roads, Transportation
Cumberland Riflemen		May 25, 1948	At park, Market St. between 24th & 25th Sts., Camp Hill; 40.24099°N 76.9254°W	Roadside	American Revolution, Military
Cumberland Valley Railroad		May 1, 1992	4 Strawberry Alley, Mechanicsburg; 40.21377°N 77.00872°W	Roadside	Railroads, Transportation
Daniel Drawbaugh		May 1, 1965	155 Lake Rd. (SR 2033) at Eberly's Mill, 1 mile W of New Cumberland; 40.22423°N 76.90683°W	Roadside	Business & Industry, Invention, Professions & Vocations
Daniel Kaufman		May 25, 2002	301 Front Street, Boiling Springs; 40.1384°N 77.12717°W	Roadside	African American, Early Settlement, Underground Railroad
Dickinson College		July 1, 1947	W High St., near 74N intersection at campus, Carlisle; 40.20223°N 77.19549°W	Roadside	Education
Dickinson School of Law		October 20, 1949	S. College St. near South St. at Law School, Carlisle; 40.19933°N 77.19696°W	City	Education
Episcopal Square		October 20, 1949	NE corner, High & Hanover Sts., Carlisle; 40.20161°N 77.18888°W	City	Government & Politics 18th Century, Religion
Farthest North of Confederates - PLAQUE		October 1929	PA 34 (E side), .7 mile N of Carlisle Springs	Plaque	Civil War, Military
First Presbyterian Church		October 21, 1949	NW corner, High & Hanover Sts., Carlisle; 40.20172°N 77.18926°W	City	Buildings, George Washington, Religion
Forbes Road (Raystown Path)		January 7, 1952	US 11 just W of Carlisle; 40.20144°N 77.21228°W	Roadside	French & Indian War, Military, Roads, Transportation
Forbes Road (Raystown Path)		January 7, 1952	US 11, 1 mile NE of Shippensburg; 40.07105°N 77.49013°W	Roadside	French & Indian War, Military, Roads, Transportation
Fort Couch		August 10, 1947	8th & Ohio Sts., Lemoyne; 40.24607°N 76.90425°W	Roadside	Civil War, Forts, Military
Fort Couch		October 13, 1953	Indiana Ave., betw. 8th St. & West Park, Lemoyne; 40.24669°N 76.90478°W	City	Civil War, Forts, Military
Fort Franklin		n/a	U.S. 11 in Shippensburg (MISSING)	Roadside	Early Settlement, Forts, French & Indian War, Military, Native American
Fort Morris		November 3, 1961	King (US 11) & Queen Sts., Shippensburg; 40.0545°N 77.51511°W	Roadside	Forts, French & Indian War, Military
Fort Morris - PLAQUE		October 1, 1921	N side of W King St. (US 11), betw. Spring & Morris, Shippensburg; 40.0545°N 77.51511°W	Plaque	Forts, French & Indian War, Military, Native American
Frederick Watts		June 11, 1994	Ritner Hwy. (US 11) & Shearer Dr. at entrance to Watts Bus. Park, W of Carlisle; 40.19287°N 77.23634°W	Roadside	Agriculture, Education, Environment, Government & Politics, Professions & Vocations
Gen. John Armstrong		November 30, 1949	NE corner, High & Bedford Sts., Carlisle; 40.20111°N 77.18647°W	City	American Revolution, Government & Politics, Military
Gen. William Irvine		November 30, 1949	SE corner, High & Bedford Sts., Carlisle; 40.201123°N 77.18657°W	City	American Revolution, Government & Politics 18th Century, Medicine & Science, Military, Professions & Vocations
George Washington		October 20, 1949	W High & West Sts., Carlisle; 40.20186°N 77.19345°W	City	American Revolution, George Washington, Military, Whiskey Rebellion
Gettysburg campaign		April 25, 2001	5115 East Trindle Road, Mechanicsburg; 40.22389°N 76.97544°W	Roadside	Civil War, Military
Gettysburg campaign		June 21, 1997	5002 Carlisle Pike, Hampden Township(@ Ye Olde Ale House); 40.23997°N 76.93239°W	Roadside	Civil War, Military
Gettysburg campaign		July 29, 1947	PA 74 just E of Carlisle near I-81; 40.19517°N 77.1679°W	Roadside	Civil War, Military
Gettysburg campaign		July 29, 1949	PA 34, .3 mile S of Carlisle near I-81; 40.17874°N 77.19034°W	Roadside	Civil War, Military
Gettysburg campaign		July 29, 1947	Walnut Bottom Rd. (SR 3023), .5 mile SW of Carlisle near I-81; 40.18822°N 77.20499°W	Roadside	Civil War, Military
Gettysburg campaign		June 28, 1963	3025 Market St., Camp Hill; 40.23997°N 76.93239°W	Roadside	Civil War, Military
Green Tree Inn		November 30, 1949	S. Hanover St. between Pomfret & High Sts., Carlisle; 40.20086°N 77.18943°W	City	Business & Industry, George Washington, Native American, Inns & Taverns
Harrisburg		August 1, 1947	Front St., at Market St., Wormleysburg; 40.253067°N 76.89576°W	Roadside	Cities & Towns, Early Settlement, Government & Politics
Henszey's Wrought Iron Arch Bridge		November 22, 2004	Valley Road on edge of campus of Central Pennsylvania College, Enola; 40.30543°N 76.9334°W	Roadside	Bridges, Business & Industry, Iron, Transportation
Irving Female College		September 29, 1954	E. Main St. (Pa. 641) near Filbert St., Mechanicsburg; 40.21547°N 76.99963°W	City	Education, Women
James Wilson		October 20, 1949	SW corner, High & Pitt Sts., Carlisle; 40.20141°N 77.19194°W	City	Government & Politics, Government & Politics 18th Century, Professions & Vocations
John Bannister Gibson		November 30, 1949	E. High St. between Hanover & Bedford Sts., Carlisle; 40.20141°N 77.18794°W	City	Government & Politics, Government & Politics 19th Century, Professions & Vocations, Writers
John W. Geary (1819-1873)		June 10, 1995	3rd & Bridge Sts., New Cumberland; 40.22568°N 76.86383°W	City	Civil War, Government & Politics, Government & Politics 19th Century, Governors, Military
Joseph Ritner		October 11, 1951	US 11, 6 miles SW of Carlisle; 40.16003°N 77.31985°W	Roadside	Education, Government & Politics, Government & Politics 19th Century, Governors
Laughlin Mill		July 29, 1947	PA 641 at E end of Newville; 40.17476°N 77.39155°W	Roadside	Buildings, Business & Industry, Mills
Locust Grove Cemetery		May 28, 2007	100 block of N Queen St., Shippensburg	Roadside	African American, Civil War, Military
Major Andre		December 6, 1949	S. Hanover St. between South & Pomfret Sts., Carlisle; 40.19918°N 77.1894°W	City	American Revolution, Military
Marcus A. Reno		September 9, 2001	3rd & Reno Sts., New Cumberland; 40.22526°N 76.86534°W	City	Civil War, Military
Marianne Moore (1887-1972)		April 25, 2002	343 N Hanover Street, Carlisle; 40.20614°N 77.18754°W	City	Education, Women, Writers
Middle Spring Church		November 6, 1950	SR 4001 (old PA 696), 2.6 miles N of Shippensburg; 40.08162°N 77.54112°W	Roadside	Buildings, Ethnic & Immigration, Religion
Molly Pitcher		November 30, 1949	S. Hanover St. between Walnut & South Sts., Carlisle; 40.19762°N 77.18935°W	City	American Revolution, Military, Women
Old Court House		November 18, 1947	E King St. (US 11) & Queen St., Shippensburg; 40.08456°N 77.51296°W	Roadside	Buildings, Government & Politics, Government & Politics 18th Century, Inns & Taverns
One-Room Schoolhouse		May 29, 1970	N Earl St./Newburg Rd. (PA 696) at the University, Shippensburg; 40.05594°N 77.52427°W	Roadside	Buildings, Education
Peace Church		Pa. 641 (Trindle Rd.) at St. John's Rd. W of Camp Hill; 40.23169°N 76.95499°W	Roadside	Buildings, Religion	
Peace Church		May 25, 1948	Carlisle Pike (SR 1010) at St. John's Rd., 1.2 miles W. of Camp Hill; 40.23757°N 76.96156°W	Roadside	Buildings, Religion
Robert Whitehill (1735-1813)		December 15, 1991	1903 Market St., Camp Hill; 40.23988°N 76.9163°W	Roadside	Government & Politics, Government & Politics 18th Century, Mansions & Manors, William Penn
Shippensburg		June 1, 1948	E King St. (US 11) near Walnut Bottom Rd. (Rt. 174), E end of Shippensburg; 40.05935°N 77.50686°W	Roadside	Cities & Towns
Shippensburg - PLAQUE		June 1, 1925	King St. (US 11) & Prince St., on Vigilant Hose Co. #1 bldg., Shippensburg; 40.05935°N 77.50686°W	Plaque	Cities & Towns, Early Settlement
Silver Spring Presbyterian Church		n/a	444 Silver Spring Rd., at church, S of Carlisle Pk. (US 11), Mechanicsburg; 40.23893°N 77.00765°W	Roadside	Early Settlement, Ethnic & Immigration, Religion
Simpson Ferry Road		September 29, 1954	Simpson St. near Walnut St., Mechanicsburg; 40.21296°N 77.00122°W	City	Early Settlement, Roads, Transportation
St. Patrick's Church		October 19, 1986	140 E. Pomfret St. at church, Carlisle; 40.19952°N 77.18578°W	City	Buildings, Native American, Religion
State Police School		July 29, 1970	Walnut St. near Big Spring Ave., Newville; 40.16993°N 77.40149°W	Roadside	Education, Police and Safety
Thomas Butler		October 21, 1949	W. High St. between Pitt & West Sts., Carlisle; 40.20253°N 77.19253°W	City	American Revolution, Military, Professions & Vocations
Thompson's Rifle Battalion		November 11, 1986	E. South St. at Old Graveyard, Carlisle (MISSING)	City	American Revolution, Military
Union Church		September 29, 1954	39 E. Main St. (Pa. 641) at church, Mechanicsburg; 40.21372°N 77.00688°W	City	Buildings, Religion
Williams Grove		October 19, 1980	Williams Grove Rd. (SR 2011), .5 mile S of Wms. Grove Park	Roadside	Agriculture, Railroads, Transportation

== See also ==
- List of Pennsylvania state historical markers
- National Register of Historic Places listings in Cumberland County, Pennsylvania
