= The Living Century =

Television series

- Genre: Biography; Documentary
- Created by: Steven Latham
- Directed by: Steven Latham; Christopher Carson
- Presented by: Jack Lemmon; Walter Cronkite
- Country of origin: United States
- Original language: English
- No. of episodes: 5

Production
- Executive producers: Barbra Streisand; Cis Corman; Steven Latham; Christopher Carson
- Producer: Nicholas M. Loeb
- Running time: 27 minutes
- Production company: Portfolio Entertainment

Original release
- Network: PBS
- Release: December 3, 2000 – July 25, 2003

The Living Century is an American biographical television series that premiered on PBS on December 3, 2000. Each episode of the half-hour series documents the life of someone who is over 100 years old. The Living Century was produced and distributed by Reverie Productions.

== Episodes ==
The first two episodes are hosted by Jack Lemmon. The remaining episodes are hosted by Walter Cronkite.

No.	Title	Original release date
1	"Three Miracles"	December 3, 2000
Rose Freedman.
2	"A Teacher and Student for Life"	December 4, 2000
Ray Crist.
TBA	"A Peaceful Warrior"	April 2003
Robert St. John
TBA	"Double Duty"	June 15, 2003
Ted Radcliffe, also known as "Double Duty", turned pro in baseball in the 1920s and played in the Negro leagues for four decades.
TBA	"3 Voices"	2003
Frederica Sagor Maas, Clifford Holiday, and Ben Levinson.

== Reception ==
"Three Miracles" won a 2001 Cine Golden Eagle award for a short form documentary, as well as a 2001 Platinum Remi Award for Best Television Documentary at the WorldFest-Houston International Film Festival.
