= Sterrett-Hassinger House =

Historic house in Pennsylvania, United States

- Formerly listed on the U.S. National Register of Historic Places
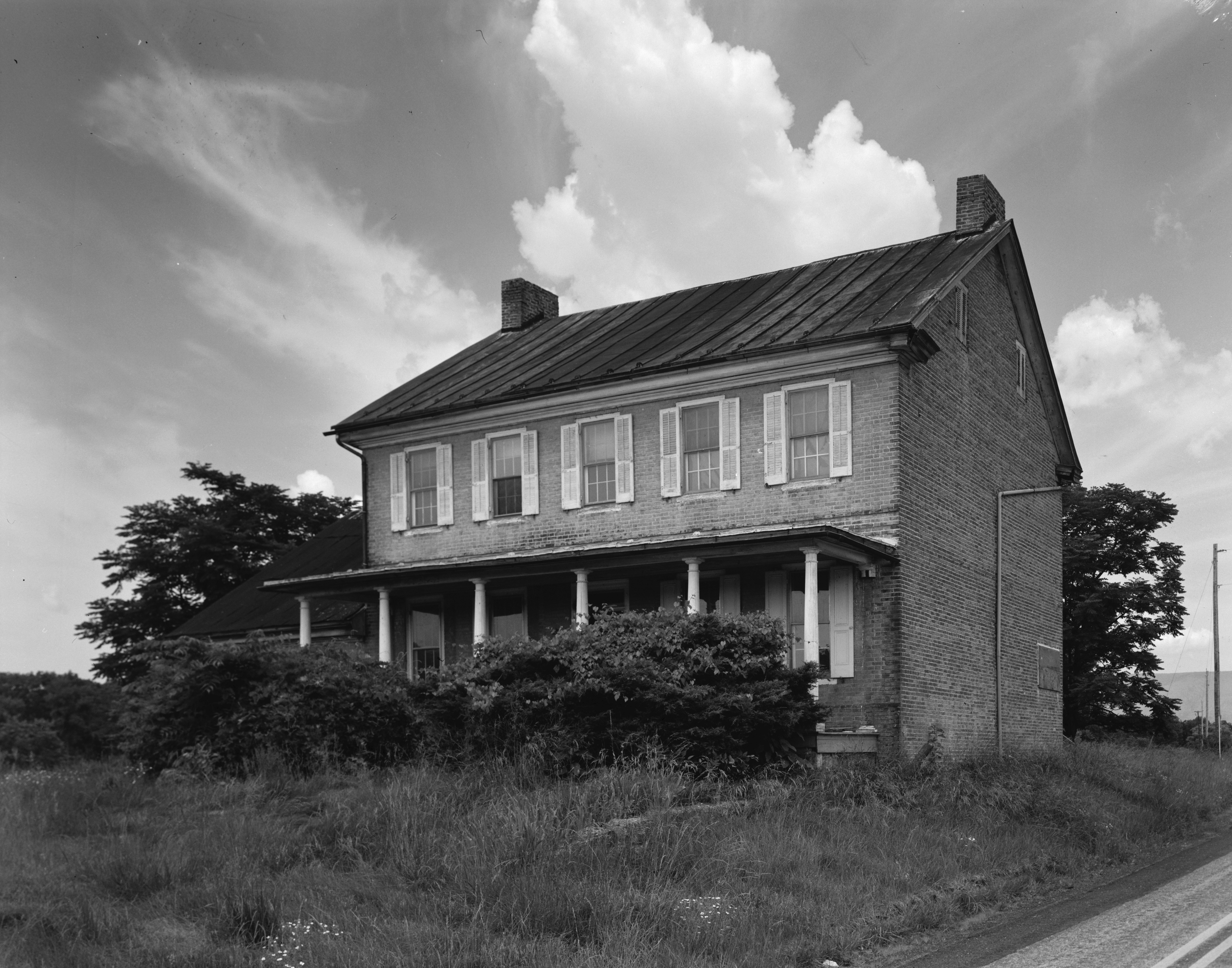
- Location: Three Squares Hollow Road, Upper Mifflin Township, Pennsylvania
- Area: 1 acre (0.40 ha)
- Built: c. 1789, c. 1830-1835, c. 1850
- Architectural style: Federal
- NRHP reference No.: 83002234

Significant dates
- Added to NRHP: September 15, 1983
- Removed from NRHP: January 20, 2000

Sterrett-Hassinger House, also known as David Sterrett House, was a historic home located at Upper Mifflin Township in Cumberland County, Pennsylvania. It was built about 1789–1791, and modified between about 1830-1835 and 1850. The house was demolished after a fire.

It was listed on the National Register of Historic Places in 1983, and delisted in 2000.
