= Ray Crist =

American chemist

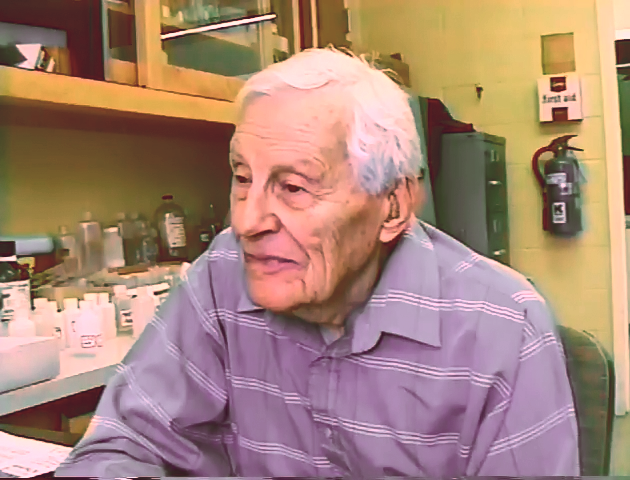
- Crist in 1996
- Born: March 8, 1900; Shepherdstown, Pennsylvania, United States
- Died: July 23, 2005 (aged 105); Carlisle, Pennsylvania
- Education: Dickinson College (B.A., 1920); Columbia University (Ph.D., 1925)
- Scientific career
- Fields: Chemistry
- Workplaces: Columbia University; Union Carbide; Dickinson College; Messiah University

Ray Crist (March 8, 1900 – July 23, 2005) was an American chemist who participated in the Manhattan Project. When he retired from teaching at the age of 104 in 2004, Crist is widely believed to have been America's oldest worker at the time.

== Biography ==
Crist was a graduate of the former Messiah School (1916), now known as Messiah University, Dickinson College (B.A., 1920) and Columbia University (Ph.D., 1925). Crist joined the faculty at Columbia University where he was a teacher and researcher from 1925 to 1941. He joined the Manhattan Project in 1941 and was among the leading scientists who developed the critical initial step of the separation of uranium isotopes. He was director of the Manhattan Project, Columbia University Group, 1945–6, after which he joined the Union Carbide Corporation in Charleston, West Virginia, first as Manager of the Coal Hydrogenation Plant, and then as Director of Research of the Olefins Division.

Between 1959 and 1963, he was Director of the Union Carbide Research Institute at Tarrytown, New York. Crist turned to volunteer teaching in 1963, following the death of his beloved wife, Dorothy Lenhart Crist, formerly of New Cumberland. As a voluntary educator, Crist pursued his mission of introducing today's students, especially non-science majors, to the impact of science and technology on culture and the environment.

From 1963 to 1970, he taught at Dickinson College. There, he taught mostly upper-level chemistry courses. However, his favorite course was on the history of science; it was a course for non-majors where he "helped students to understand some of the basic laws of the natural world around them." In 1970, Crist was forced to resign due to the since repealed mandatory retirement age of 70.

From 1971 until his retirement in 2004, he continued his academic career at Messiah University. He taught mostly environmental chemistry and was a major force behind the development of the Environmental Sciences program. During the final two decades of his work at Messiah, up to the age of 104, he worked on experiments involving adsorption of toxic metals by plant material and the use of living plants for purifying the environment (phytoremediation). The results of these experiments appeared in twenty-seven journal articles and were reported at ten international conferences. Messiah professor of the history of science Edward B. Davis believes that he may have been the oldest publishing research scientist in history.

His academic achievements and his overcoming the challenges of aging were recognized by numerous events and awards such as America's Outstanding Older Worker (2002), the PBS series The Living Century in the episode "A Teacher and Student for Life", and the editorial "Phytoremediation's Centenarian" (International Journal of Phytoremediation, 2002), as well as extensive additional press and television coverage both in the United States and abroad. His memoir - Listening to Nature: My Century in Science (Seaburn Publications) - appeared in 2005. Crist died in Carlisle, Pennsylvania on July 23, 2005, at the age of 105.
