= Amelia S. Givin Free Library =

- U.S. National Register of Historic Places
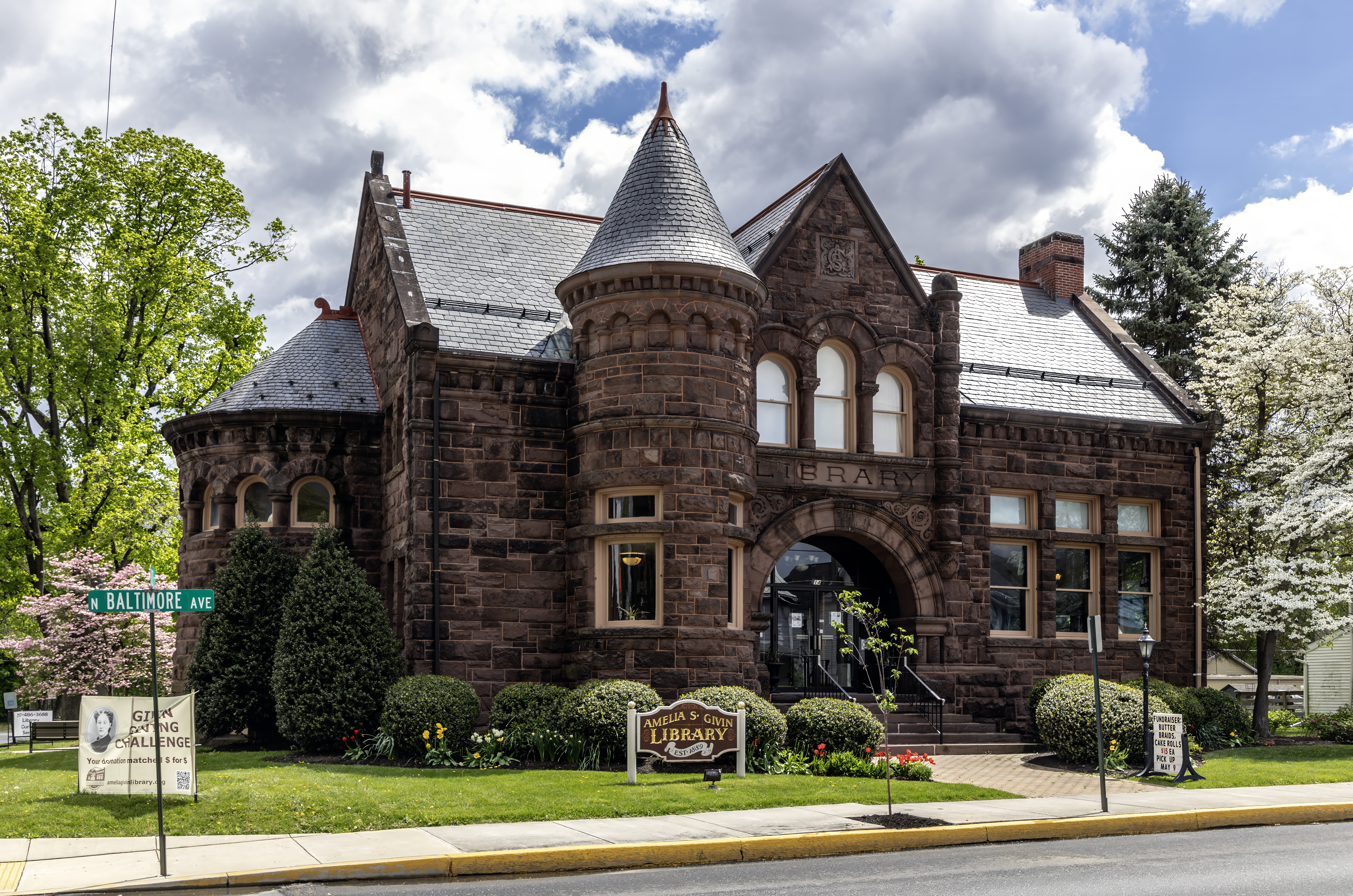
- Amelia S. Givin Free Library in 2024

- Location within Pennsylvania
- Location: 114 North Baltimore Avenue, Mount Holly Springs, Pennsylvania
- Coordinates: 40°6′59″N 77°11′21″W
- Built: 1889
- Architect: James T. Steen
- Architectural style: Romanesque Revival
- NRHP reference No.: 04000841
- Added to NRHP: August 11, 2004

The Amelia S. Givin Free Library is a historic public library in Mount Holly Springs, Cumberland County, Pennsylvania. It was added to the National Register of Historic Places on August 11, 2004.

== History ==
The library was built in 1889 and was dedicated on January 2, 1890. The library was listed on the National Register of Historic Places on August 11, 2004.

== Architecture ==
It was designed by Richardsonian Romanesque student James T. Steen and is faced with Hummelstown brownstone. Design elements include intricate carvings, semicircular arched windows, crescent apse and moorish fretwork. The Amelia S. Givin Free Library "contains the most extensive and most elaborate installation of moorish fretwork still in existence today".

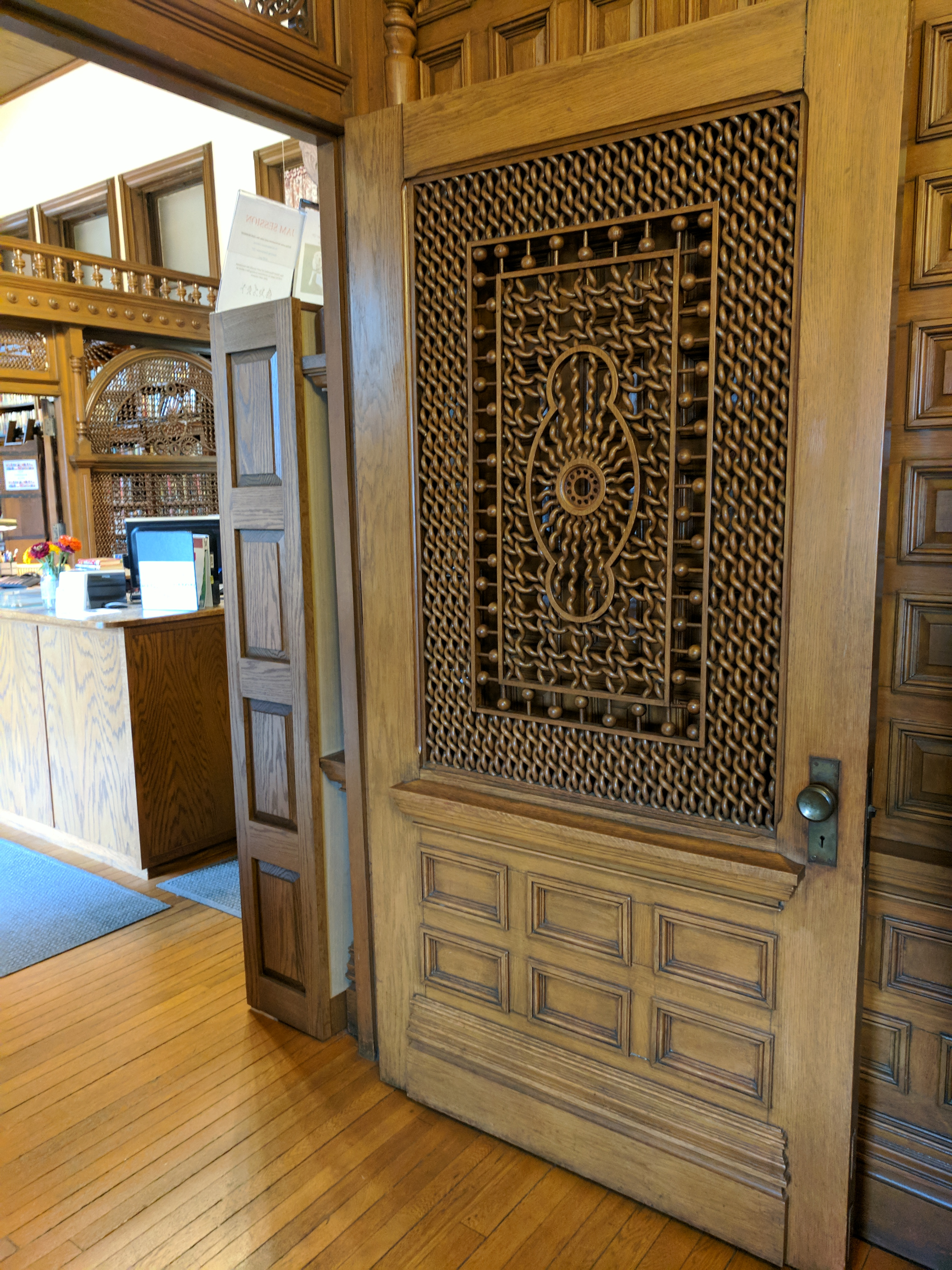
Moorish Fretwork Door

== See also ==
- National Register of Historic Places listings in Cumberland County, Pennsylvania
