= Mount Holly Park =

Defunct resort in Pennsylvania, USA

Coordinates: 40.1261°N 77.1880°W

Mount Holly Park was a summer resort and amusement park located along Mountain Creek in Mount Holly Springs, Pennsylvania. The park opened in 1901. It began to decline from 1918, and closed between 1928 and 1930.

== History ==
Mount Holly Park was opened in 1901 by Harrisburg-based entrepreneur Patricio Russ, serving as an attraction on his "Trolley to Holly" line. The park spanned approximately one mile along Mountain Creek.

In 1904, Russ leased additional property, including an artificial lake. Russ extended the trolley line to provide direct access to the lake. Visitors would disembark near the present-day Deer Lodge restaurant, and the park ran along the road connected to the restaurant's parking lot.

The trolley line peaked in 1906 with a maximum ridership of 212,605 passengers. Thousands of people attended events at the park, such as the Harvest Home Picnic of Cumberland County.

== Attractions ==
- Bandstand - Located on the shore of Mountain Creek
- Baseball field
- Boating
- Bowling alley
- Dance pavilion - Measured approximately 80 feet long by 40 feet wide
- Dining area
- Ferris wheel - The first Ferris wheel in Cumberland County
- Flower gardens
- Hiking trails
- Mineral springs - Noted at the time for providing health benefits
- Observatory - Located at the top of South Mountain, featured a telescope
- Restaurant
- Roller Coaster
- Tennis courts

=== Roller Coaster fatality ===
In 1912, Thomas Blair of Newville, Pennsylvania stood up while the roller coaster was in operation and fell out of his car. Another car crashed into the car he had been occupying, crushing Blair's breastbone and jaws. He later died at a local hospital. This accident prompted the closure of the ride, and contributed to the closure of the park itself.

== Closure ==
The popularity of Mount Holly Park decreased with the increased adoption of personal automobiles (thus driving down trolley ridership), the onset of the Great Depression, the Roller Coaster fatality, and damage to the dam in the park's artificial lake due to flooding. The park eventually closed at some point between 1928 and 1930. Trolley service in Carlisle and Mount Holly Springs ended on December 1, 1930.

It is still possible to view the remains of the restaurant's foundation, one of the springs, and the upper and lower dams. The upper dam was demolished in 1989, but the concrete spillway foundations and earthen wall still remain.

=== Mount Holly Springs Marsh Preserve ===
The property today is known as Mount Holly Marsh Preserve. It was acquired by The Nature Conservancy in 1992 with help from the Holly Gap Committee, a group of local community members who raised funds to permanently preserve the land. Cumberland County currently owns the land, managing it in cooperation with the Nature Conservancy. Activities within the preserve include hiking (with over 7 miles of trails) and bird watching.
