= Union Hotel (Shepherdstown, Pennsylvania) =

- U.S. National Register of Historic Places
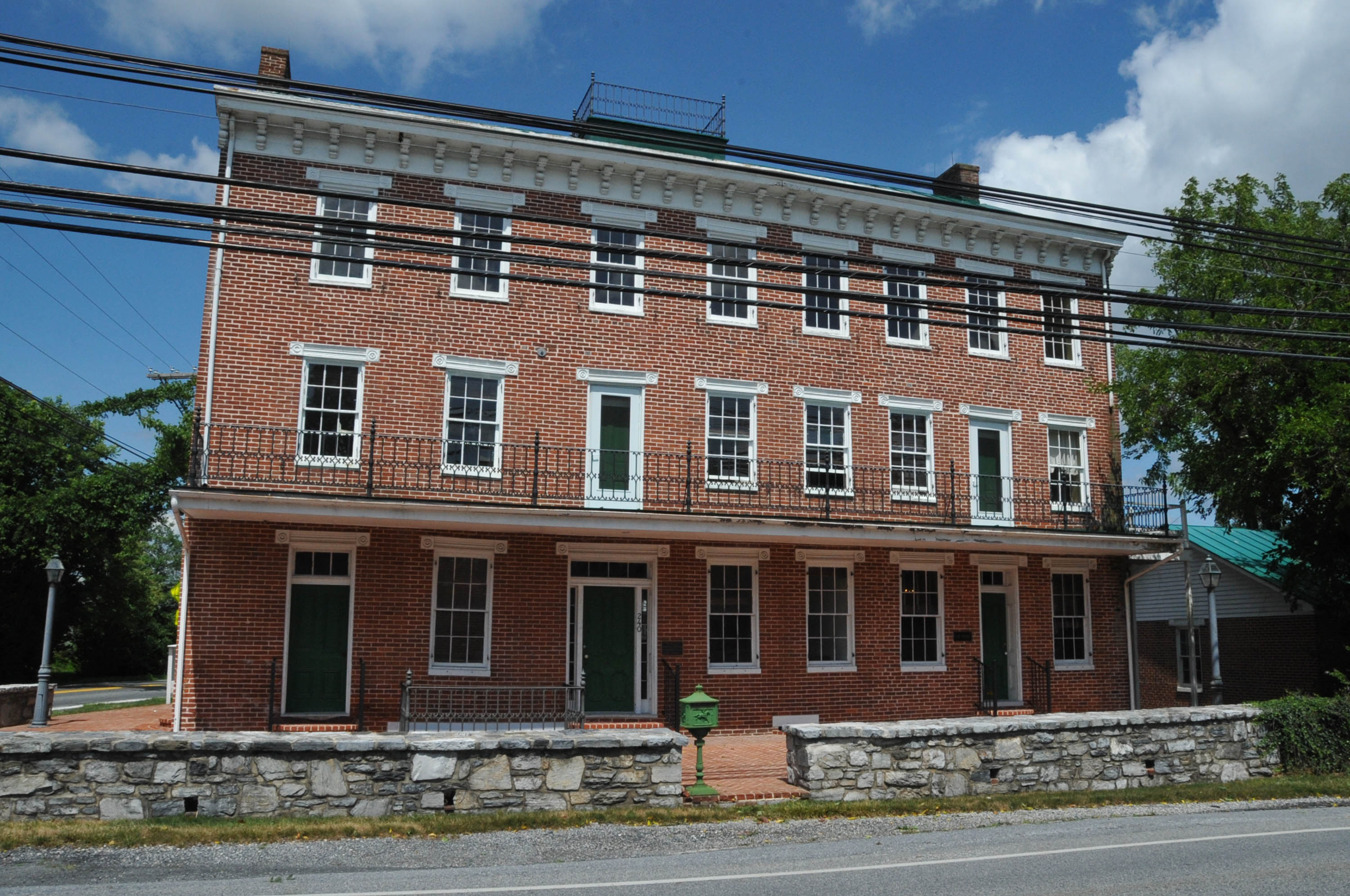

- Location within Pennsylvania Location within the United States
- Location: 240 Old Gettysburg Rd., Shepherdstown, Pennsylvania
- Coordinates: 40°10′41″N 76°59′30″W
- Area: 1 acre (0.40 ha)
- Built: 1860
- Built by: Zook, Abraham W.
- Architectural style: Georgian
- NRHP reference No.: 89000362
- Added to NRHP: May 5, 1989

The Union Hotel, also known as the Shepherdstown Hotel or Hilltop Inn, is an historic hotel that is located in Shepherdstown in Cumberland County, Pennsylvania, United States.

It was listed on the National Register of Historic Places in 1989.

== History and architectural features ==
Built in 1860, this historic structure consists of a three-story, eight-bay, rectangular, brick main section that was designed in the Georgian style and measures fifty-six feet, six inches wide by thrty-three feet deep. It has a brick ell that also dates to circa 1860 and a 1 1/2-story frame summer kitchen. A one-story frame addition was built circa 1920. The building was restored during the 1980s.

The hotel was built by Abraham and Mary Zook, situated in a prime hilltop location on the Gettysburg Pike. It was initially used as a tavern, eventually being sold to Adolphus Busch of the Anheuser-Busch Brewing Co. It was sold once again before the beginning of prohibition, on Oct. 26, 1918. Between that time and October 1922, the building was a private home. After this period, the home was bought by John Ungar and became the Hilltop Inn, a Pennsylvania Dutch-style restaurant. In 1932, the structure was once again a private residence. Since the completion of U.S. Route 15, the Union Hotel has been situated in a less prominent location to passersby. It still serves as the focal point of Shepherdstown and as inspiration for the architecture of nearby developments, which have effectively taken the Union Hotel’s role of being a rest stop for travelers.

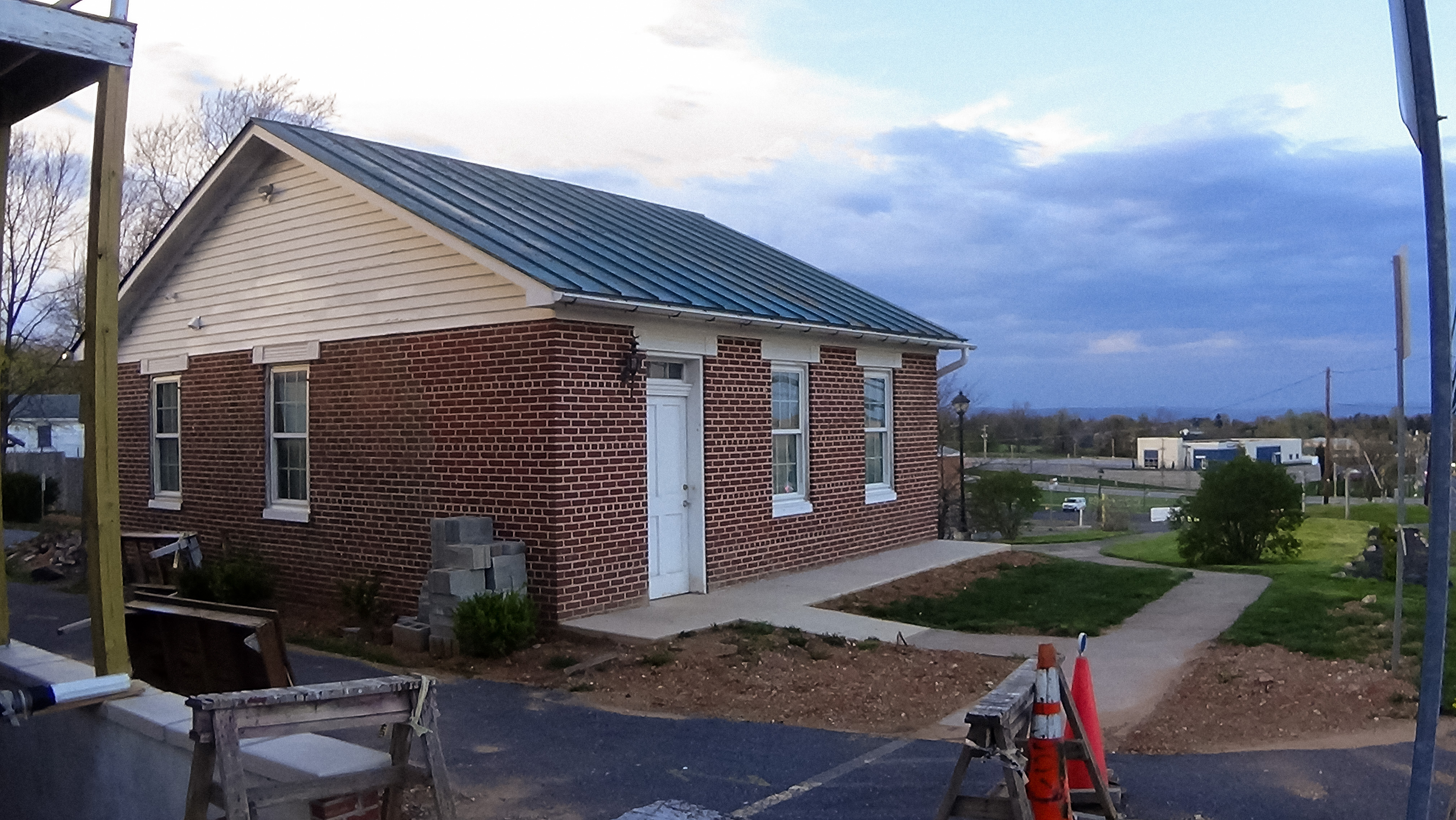
One of the Union Hotel's two outbuildings.
