= John Wormley House =

Historic house in Pennsylvania, United States

- U.S. National Register of Historic Places
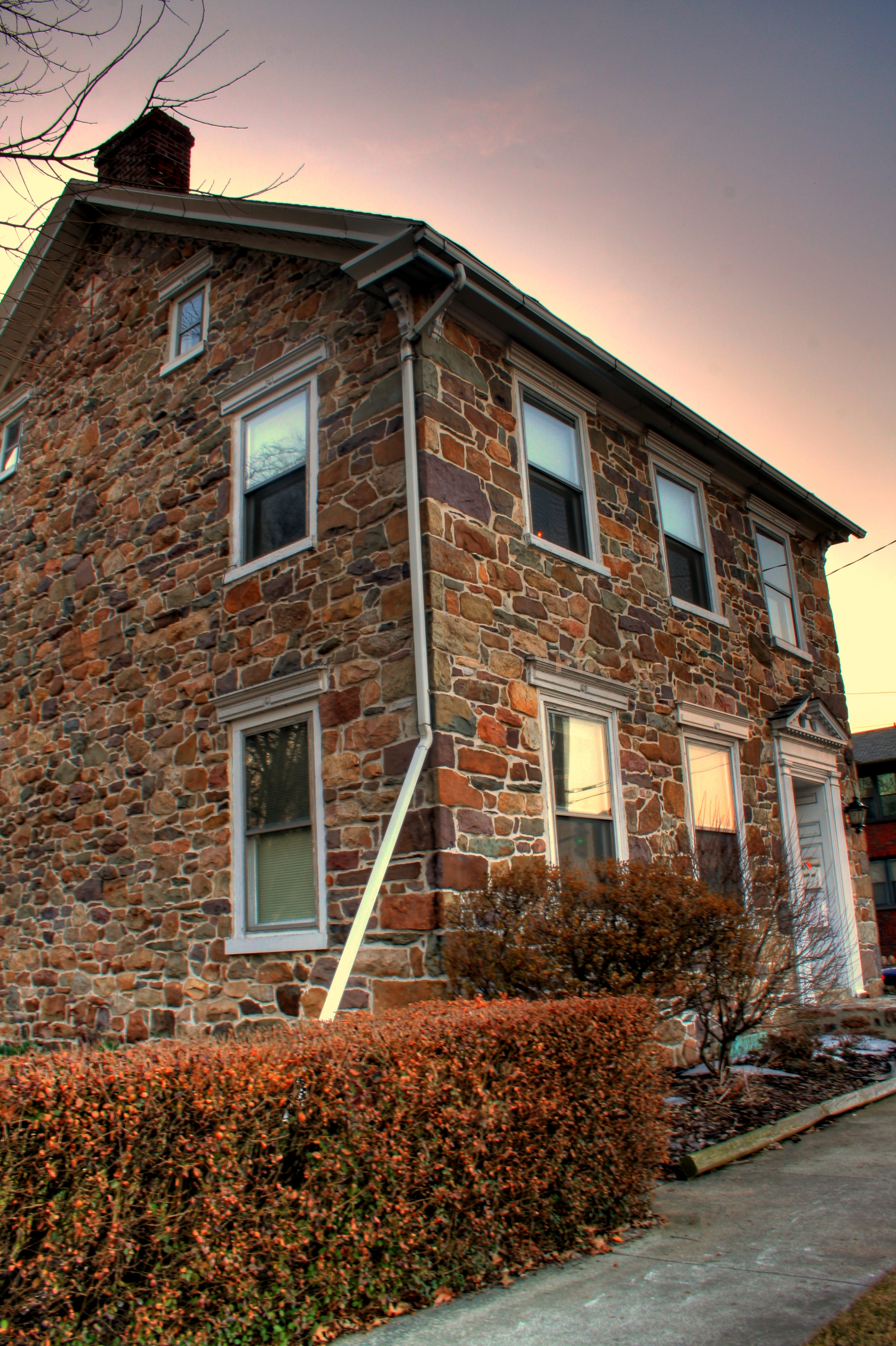
- John Wormley House, March 2007

- Location within Pennsylvania Location within the United States
- Location: 126 N Front St., Wormleysburg, Pennsylvania
- Coordinates: 40°15′23″N 76°54′3″W
- Area: 0.7 acres (0.28 ha)
- Built: c. 1815
- Architectural style: Half-Georgian style
- NRHP reference No.: 76001630
- Added to NRHP: November 21, 1976

The John Wormley House, also known as the Valentine Hummel House, is an historic home that is located in Wormleysburg in Cumberland County, Pennsylvania, United States.

It was listed on the National Register of Historic Places in 1976.

== History and architectural features ==
Built circa 1769, this historic structure is a 2 1/2-story, log building with a tin roof. Three bays wide and two bays deep, it has a two-story, side frame addition, and faces U.S. Highways 11 and 15. It was designed in a semi-Georgian style, and was built by John Wormley, Jr., the founder of Wormleysburg.
