= Wormleysburg, Pennsylvania =

Borough in Pennsylvania, US

- Borough
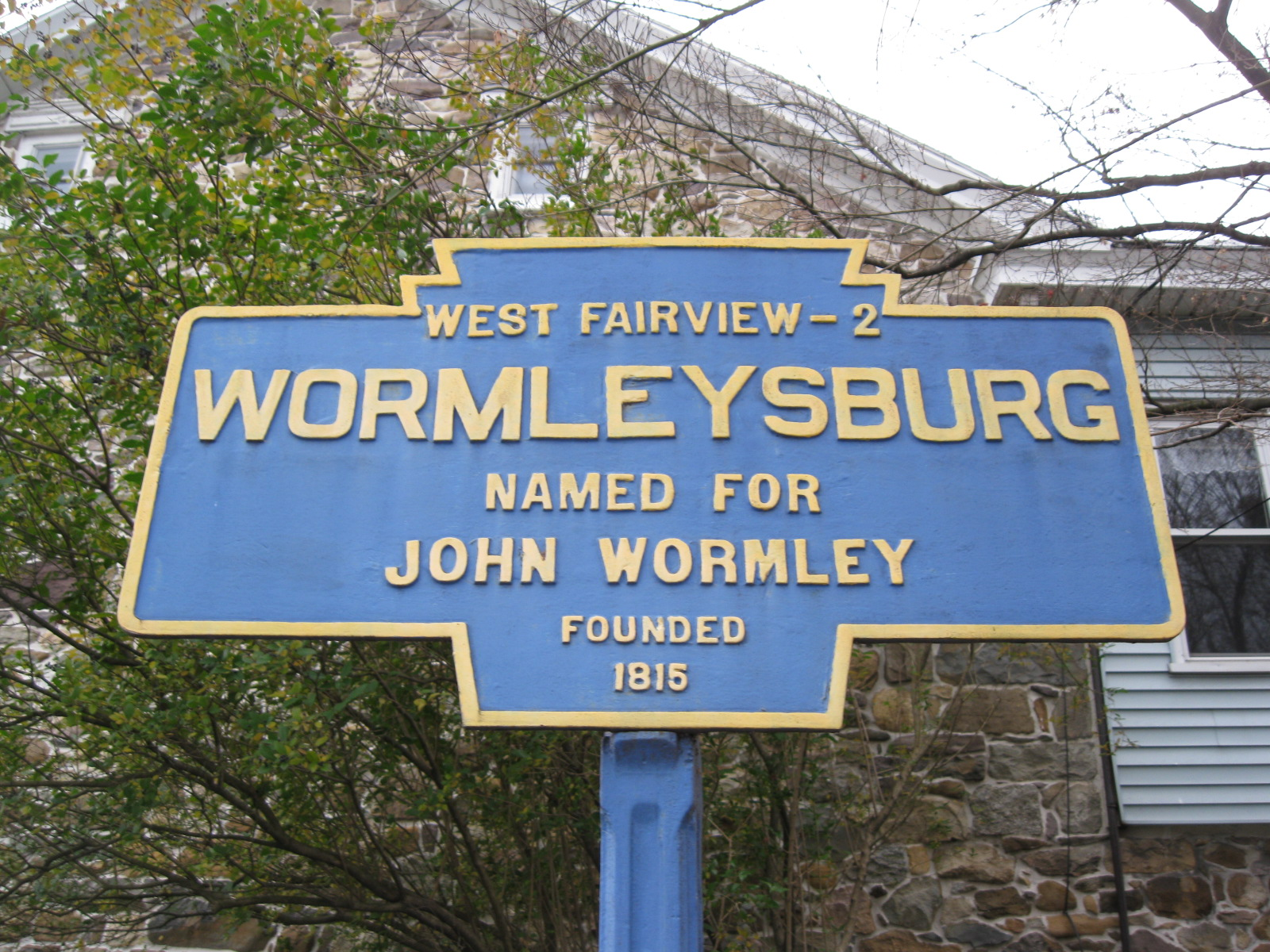
- Keystone Marker

- Seal
- Motto: A Capitol Reflection
- Location of Wormleysburg in Cumberland County, Pennsylvania

- Location of Wormleysburg in Pennsylvania and the United States Wormleysburg (the United States)
- Coordinates: 40°15′31″N 76°54′21″W
- Country: United States
- State: Pennsylvania
- County: Cumberland
- Settled: 1772
- Incorporated: 1916

Government
  - Type: Borough Council
  - Mayor: George O. Preble
  - Council President: Sue Stuart

Area
  - Total: 0.79 sq mi (2.04 km^{2})
  - Land: 0.78 sq mi (2.01 km^{2})
  - Water: 0.012 sq mi (0.03 km^{2})
- Elevation: 338 ft (103 m)

Population (2010)
  - Total: 3,070
  - Estimate (2019): 3,054
  - Density: 3,932.8/sq mi (1,518.46/km^{2})
- Time zone: UTC-5 (Eastern (EST))
  - Summer (DST): UTC-4 (EDT)
- ZIP Codes: 17043, 17011
- Area code: 717 223
- FIPS code: 42-86528
- Website: www.wormleysburgpa.org

Wormleysburg is a borough in Cumberland County, Pennsylvania, United States. As of the 2020 census, Wormleysburg had a population of 3,043. It is part of the Harrisburg metropolitan area.

Wormleysburg is served by West Shore School District. The borough is home to Harsco Corporation.

== History ==
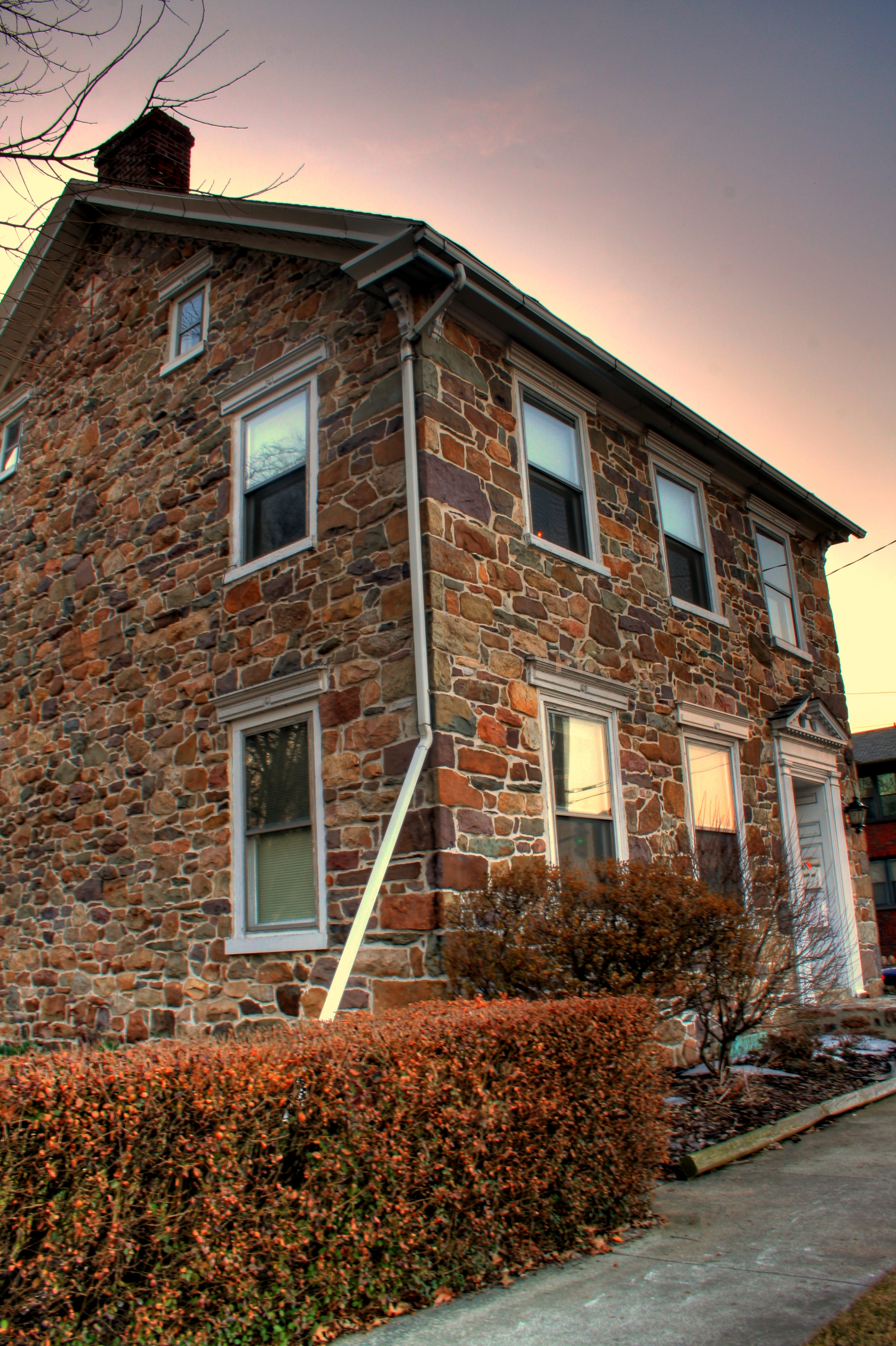
The John Wormley House in March 2007

The community was named for founder John Wormley and was incorporated as a borough in May 1916 from East Pennsboro Township.

The John Wormley House was added to the National Register of Historic Places in 1976.

== Geography ==
Wormleysburg is located on the eastern border of Cumberland County at 40°15′31″N 76°54′21″W (40.258689, -76.905954). It is situated on the west bank of the Susquehanna River across from Harrisburg, the state capital. It is bordered to the north and west by East Pennsboro Township and to the south by the borough of Lemoyne. U.S. Routes 11 and 15 pass through the borough together, leading north 4.5 miles (7.2 km) to Exit 65 on Interstate 81 and southwest 3 miles (5 km) through Camp Hill to the Capital Beltway (Pennsylvania Route 581). The M. Harvey Taylor Memorial Bridge and Market Street Bridge cross the Susquehanna from Wormleysburg into Harrisburg.

According to the U.S. Census Bureau, Wormleysburg has a total area of 0.81 square miles (2.1 km^{2}), of which 0.01 square miles (0.03 km^{2}), or 1.33%, is water.

== Demographics ==
Historical population
Census	Pop.	Note	%±
1880	297		—
1890	555		86.9%
1910	809		—
1920	866		7.0%
1930	1,404		62.1%
1940	1,454		3.6%
1950	1,511		3.9%
1960	1,794		18.7%
1970	3,192		77.9%
1980	2,796		−12.4%
1990	2,847		1.8%
2000	2,607		−8.4%
2010	3,070		17.8%
2020	3,043		−0.9%

=== 2020 census ===
As of the 2020 census, Wormleysburg had a population of 3,043. The median age was 37.7 years. 19.9% of residents were under the age of 18 and 16.3% of residents were 65 years of age or older. For every 100 females there were 99.9 males, and for every 100 females age 18 and over there were 95.4 males age 18 and over.

100.0% of residents lived in urban areas, while 0.0% lived in rural areas.

There were 1,426 households in Wormleysburg, of which 24.5% had children under the age of 18 living in them. Of all households, 34.3% were married-couple households, 23.7% were households with a male householder and no spouse or partner present, and 31.3% were households with a female householder and no spouse or partner present. About 37.6% of all households were made up of individuals and 11.8% had someone living alone who was 65 years of age or older.

There were 1,538 housing units, of which 7.3% were vacant. The homeowner vacancy rate was 1.0% and the rental vacancy rate was 6.5%.

Racial composition as of the 2020 census
Race	Number	Percent
White	2,176	71.5%
Black or African American	261	8.6%
American Indian and Alaska Native	10	0.3%
Asian	276	9.1%
Native Hawaiian and Other Pacific Islander	5	0.2%
Some other race	101	3.3%
Two or more races	214	7.0%
Hispanic or Latino (of any race)	239	7.9%

=== 2000 census ===
As of the census of 2000, there were 2,607 people, 1,295 households, and 663 families residing in the borough. The population density was 2,794.1 inhabitants per square mile (1,078.8/km^{2}). There were 1,399 housing units at an average density of 1,499.4 units per square mile (578.9 units/km^{2}). The racial makeup of the borough was 92.14% White, 1.30% African American, 0.15% Native American, 4.22% Asian, 0.04% Pacific Islander, 0.31% from other races, and 1.84% from two or more races. Hispanic or Latino of any race were 1.34% of the population.

There were 1,295 households, out of which 19.4% had children under the age of 18 living with them, 40.2% were married couples living together, 8.7% had a female householder with no husband present, and 48.8% were non-families. 39.9% of all households were made up of individuals, and 10.4% had someone living alone who was 65 years of age or older. The average household size was 2.01 and the average family size was 2.71.

In the borough the population was spread out, with 17.7% under the age of 18, 8.7% from 18 to 24, 32.6% from 25 to 44, 25.1% from 45 to 64, and 16.0% who were 65 years of age or older. The median age was 38 years. For every 100 females, there were 96.5 males. For every 100 females age 18 and over, there were 95.1 males.

The median income for a household in the borough was $40,536, and the median income for a family was $49,342. Males had a median income of $36,250 versus $27,902 for females. The per capita income for the borough was $28,504. About 3.6% of families and 5.2% of the population were below the poverty line, including 8.2% of those under age 18 and 1.5% of those age 65 or over.
