= South Middleton Township, Pennsylvania =

Township in Pennsylvania, US

Coordinates: 40°08′00″N 77°07′28″W

- Township
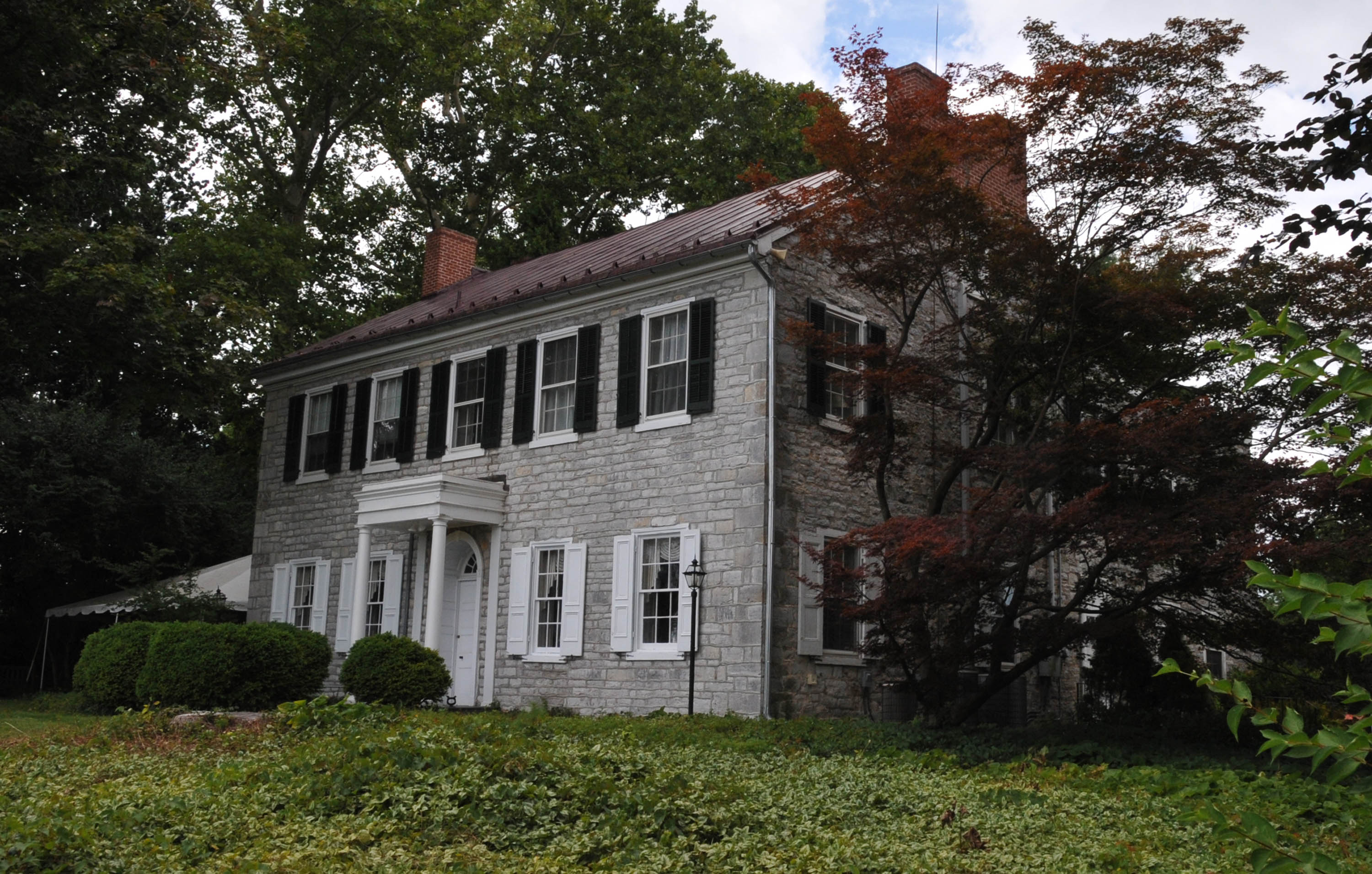
- James Given Tavern, built 1820

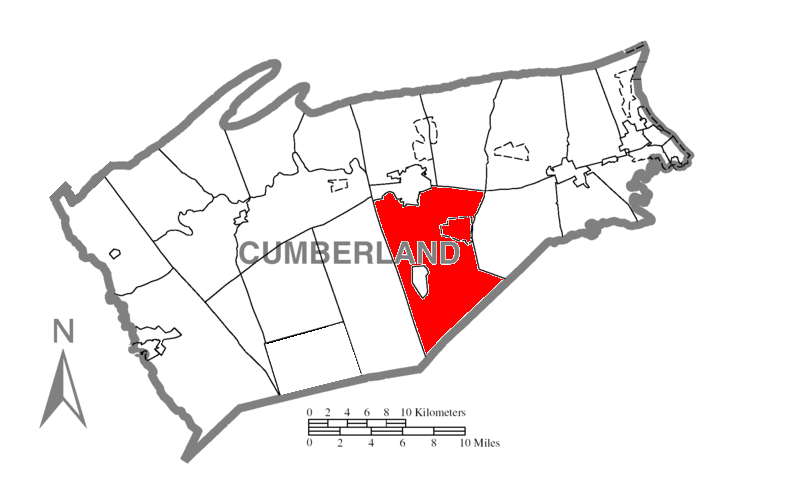
- Map of Cumberland County, Pennsylvania highlighting South Middleton Township

- Map of Cumberland County, Pennsylvania
- Country: United States
- State: Pennsylvania
- County: Cumberland

Government
  - Type: Board of Supervisors

Area
  - Total: 49.05 sq mi (127.03 km^{2})
  - Land: 48.74 sq mi (126.23 km^{2})
  - Water: 0.31 sq mi (0.80 km^{2})

Population (2020)
  - Total: 16,135
  - Estimate (2016): 15,352
  - Density: 315.0/sq mi (121.62/km^{2})
- Time zone: UTC-5 (Eastern (EST))
  - Summer (DST): UTC-4 (EDT)
- Area code: 717
- FIPS code: 42-041-72336
- Website: www.smiddleton.com

Historical population
Census	Pop.	Note	%±
2000	12,939		—
2010	14,663		13.3%
2016 (est.)	15,352		4.7%
U.S. Decennial Census

South Middleton Township is a township in Cumberland County, Pennsylvania, United States. The population was 14,663 at the 2010 census, up from 12,939 at the 2000 census.

== History ==
The James Given Tavern was added to the National Register of Historic Places in 1992.

== Geography ==
The township is in the southern half of central Cumberland County and is bordered to the south by York and Adams counties. The northern half of the township lies within the Cumberland Valley region, while the southern half is occupied by large hills associated with the South Mountain range. The township is bordered to the north by the borough of Carlisle, the county seat. The borough of Mount Holly Springs is surrounded by the southwest part of the township but is a separate municipality. The unincorporated community of Boiling Springs is near the eastern edge of the township, on the north side of Yellow Breeches Creek.

Interstate 81 passes through the northern reaches of the township as it bypasses Carlisle, with access from Exits 44 through 49. Carlisle Airport is in the township on the south side of I-81, between Exits 47 and 48.

According to the United States Census Bureau, the township has a total area of 49.0 square miles (127.0 km^{2}), of which 48.7 square miles (126.2 km^{2}) are land and 0.3 square miles (0.8 km^{2}), or 0.63%, is water.

== Demographics ==
As of the census of 2010, there were 14,663 people, 5,081 households, and 3,805 families residing in the township. The population density was 296.2 inhabitants per square mile (114.4/km^{2}). There were 5,302 housing units at an average density of 107.2 per square mile (41.4/km^{2}). The racial makeup of the township was 97.16% White, 0.67% African American, 0.07% Native American, 0.94% Asian, 0.09% Pacific Islander, 0.33% from other races, and 0.74% from two or more races. Hispanic or Latino of any race were 0.90% of the population.

There were 5,081 households, out of which 31.1% had children under the age of 18 living with them, 64.7% were married couples living together, 7.8% had a female householder with no husband present, and 25.1% were non-families. 21.0% of all households were made up of individuals, and 9.9% had someone living alone who was 65 years of age or older. The average household size was 2.51 and the average family size was 2.91.

In the township the population was spread out, with 23.8% under the age of 18, 5.6% from 18 to 24, 27.4% from 25 to 44, 26.2% from 45 to 64, and 17.0% who were 65 years of age or older. The median age was 41 years. For every 100 females there were 94.7 males. For every 100 females age 18 and over, there were 91.6 males.

The median income for a household in the township was $50,503, and the median income for a family was $60,511. Males had a median income of $40,427 versus $26,593 for females. The per capita income for the township was $24,370. About 3.4% of families and 4.4% of the population were below the poverty line, including 4.8% of those under age 18 and 7.9% of those age 65 or over.
