= Mount Holly Springs, Pennsylvania =

Borough in Pennsylvania, US

- Borough
- Location of Mount Holly Springs in Cumberland County, Pennsylvania.

- Location in Pennsylvania and the United States Mount Holly Springs (the United States)
- Coordinates: 40°06′58″N 77°11′12″W
- Country: United States
- State: Pennsylvania
- County: Cumberland

Government
  - Type: Borough Council
  - Mayor: Vacant - November 2021

Area
  - Total: 1.45 sq mi (3.76 km^{2})
  - Land: 1.36 sq mi (3.52 km^{2})
  - Water: 0.093 sq mi (0.24 km^{2})
- Elevation: 558 ft (170 m)

Population (2020)
  - Total: 1,995
  - Density: 1,467.7/sq mi (566.68/km^{2})
- Time zone: UTC-5 (Eastern (EST))
  - Summer (DST): UTC-4 (EDT)
- ZIP Code: 17065
- Area codes: 717 and 223
- FIPS code: 42-51592
- Website: mhsboro.org

Mount Holly Springs is a borough in Cumberland County, Pennsylvania, United States. The borough is located 25 miles north of Gettysburg. As of the 2020 census, Mount Holly Springs had a population of 1,995. It is part of the Harrisburg–Carlisle metropolitan statistical area.

== Geography ==
Mount Holly Springs is located in south-central Cumberland County at 40°6′58″N 77°11′12″W (40.116063, -77.186751), at the northern foot of the South Mountain range. Mountain Creek runs through the center of the borough, exiting the mountains via a water gap between Mount Holly to the west and Keller Hill to the east. Mountain Creek is a tributary of Yellow Breeches Creek, which flows east to the Susquehanna River. The borough limits extend south through the water gap to the Upper Mill area.

According to the U.S. Census Bureau, the borough has a total area of 1.5 square miles (3.8 km^{2}), of which 1.4 square miles (3.5 km^{2}) is land and 0.1 square miles (0.2 km^{2}), or 6.45%, is water. The borough is surrounded by South Middleton Township but is a separate municipality.

== History ==
The Pennsylvania Guide, compiled by the Writers' Program of the Works Progress Administration, briefly described Mt. Holly Springs in 1940, writing that it was:

laid out in a gorge of South Mountain in 1815 and once a popular watering place. Mineral springs still flow, but the pavilions where the water was dispensed are decaying. Between 1770 and 1855 iron furnaces and forges here made use of extensive local ore deposits. According to tradition, it was in a forge here that William Denning made the first wrought-iron cannon. A clothing factory and two paper mills provide employment.

— Federal Writers'Project, "Part III: Tours", Pennsylvania: A Guide to the Keystone State (1940)

In the early 1900s, Mount Holly Springs was home to Mount Holly Park, a popular summer resort. The park closed in 1918.

== Demographics ==
Historical population
Census	Pop.	Note	%±
1880	1,256		—
1890	1,190		−5.3%
1900	1,328		11.6%
1910	1,272		−4.2%
1920	1,109		−12.8%
1930	1,140		2.8%
1940	1,260		10.5%
1950	1,701		35.0%
1960	1,840		8.2%
1970	2,009		9.2%
1980	2,068		2.9%
1990	1,925		−6.9%
2000	1,925		0.0%
2010	2,030		5.5%
2020	1,995		−1.7%

As of the 2000 census, there were 1,925 people, 836 households, and 541 families residing in the borough. The population density was 1,276.8 inhabitants per square mile (493.0/km^{2}). There were 926 housing units at an average density of 614.2 per square mile (237.1/km^{2}). The racial makeup of the borough was 97.82% White, 0.88% African American, 0.05% Native American, 0.52% Asian, 0.31% from other races, and 0.42% from two or more races. Hispanic or Latino of any race were 1.19% of the population.

There were 836 households, out of which 31.3% had children under the age of 18 living with them, 50.1% were married couples living together, 10.4% had a female householder with no husband present, and 35.2% were non-families. 29.4% of all households were made up of individuals, and 10.4% had someone living alone who was 65 years of age or older. The average household size was 2.30 and the average family size was 2.86.

In the borough, the population was spread out, with 24.5% under the age of 18, 6.5% from 18 to 24, 34.1% from 25 to 44, 22.6% from 45 to 64, and 12.3% who were 65 years of age or older. The median age was 36 years. For every 100 females, there were 100.3 males. For every 100 females age 18 and over, there were 98.6 males.

The median income for a household in the borough was $40,625, and the median income for a family was $48,333. Males had a median income of $33,731 versus $25,262 for females. The per capita income for the borough was $19,229. About 5.4% of families and 6.0% of the population were below the poverty line, including 12.9% of those under age 18 and 6.0% of those age 65 or over.

== Education ==
It is in the Carlisle Area School District (as an exclave of that district). Carlisle High School is the comprehensive high school of that district.

== Points of interest ==
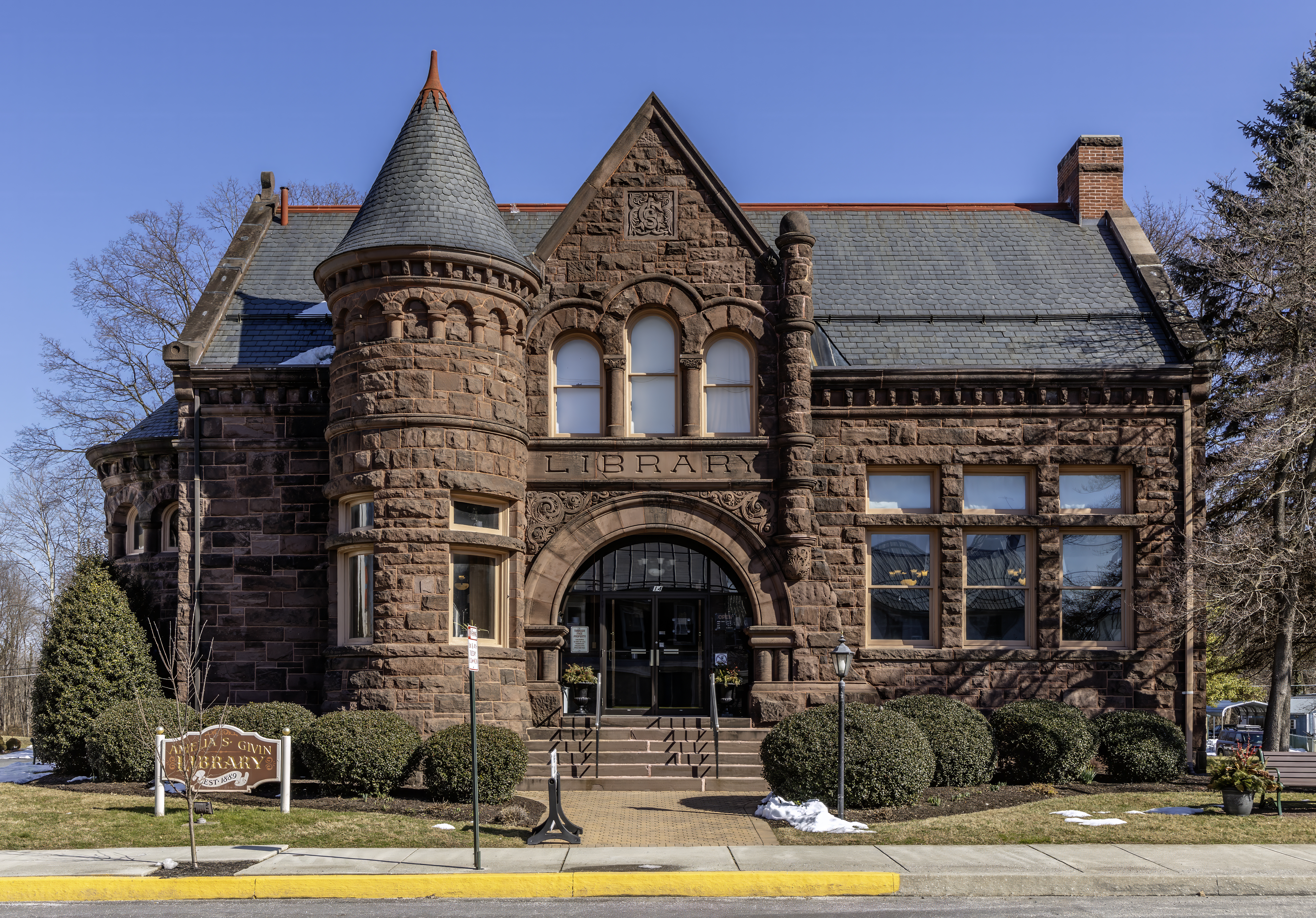
Amelia S. Givin Library

- Amelia S. Givin Free Library, an example of Richardsonian Romanesque architecture, housing a collection of the spiral fretwork patented by Moses Y. Ransom.

== Notable person ==
- Sid Bream, a former first baseman in Major League Baseball.
