= James Given Tavern =

- U.S. National Register of Historic Places
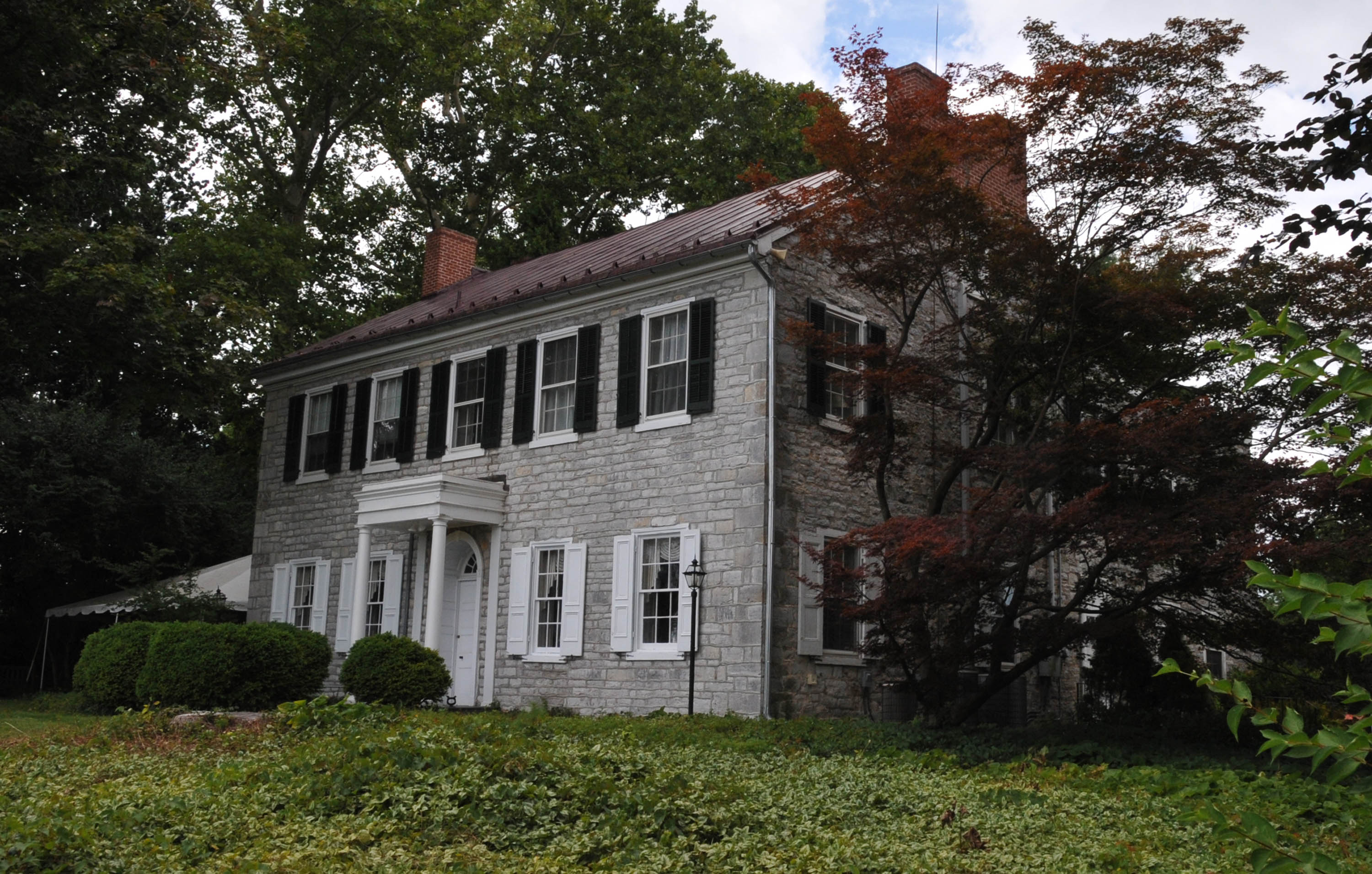

- Location within Pennsylvania Location within the United States
- Location: 1189 Walnut Bottom Rd., South Middleton Township, Pennsylvania
- Coordinates: 40°10′51″N 77°13′11″W
- Area: 5.7 acres (2.3 ha)
- Built: 1820
- Architectural style: Federal
- NRHP reference No.: 92000943
- Added to NRHP: July 24, 1992

The James Given Tavern, also known as Two Mile House, is an historic inn and tavern in South Middleton Township, Cumberland County, Pennsylvania, United States.

It was listed on the National Register of Historic Places in 1992.

== History and architectural features ==
The original section was built in 1820. It consists of a two-and-one-half-story, five-bay wide, limestone, main block with a two-story, two-bay rear kitchen ell, and one-and-one-half-story stone addition that was built during the 1920s. It has a Federal-style interior.

A portico with Doric order columns was built circa 1840. The portico was originally on the Lamberton House in Carlisle, Pennsylvania, United States. This historic structure housed a tavern until 1857.
