= Carlisle Historic District (Carlisle, Pennsylvania) =

Historic district in Pennsylvania, United States

- U.S. National Register of Historic Places
- U.S. Historic district
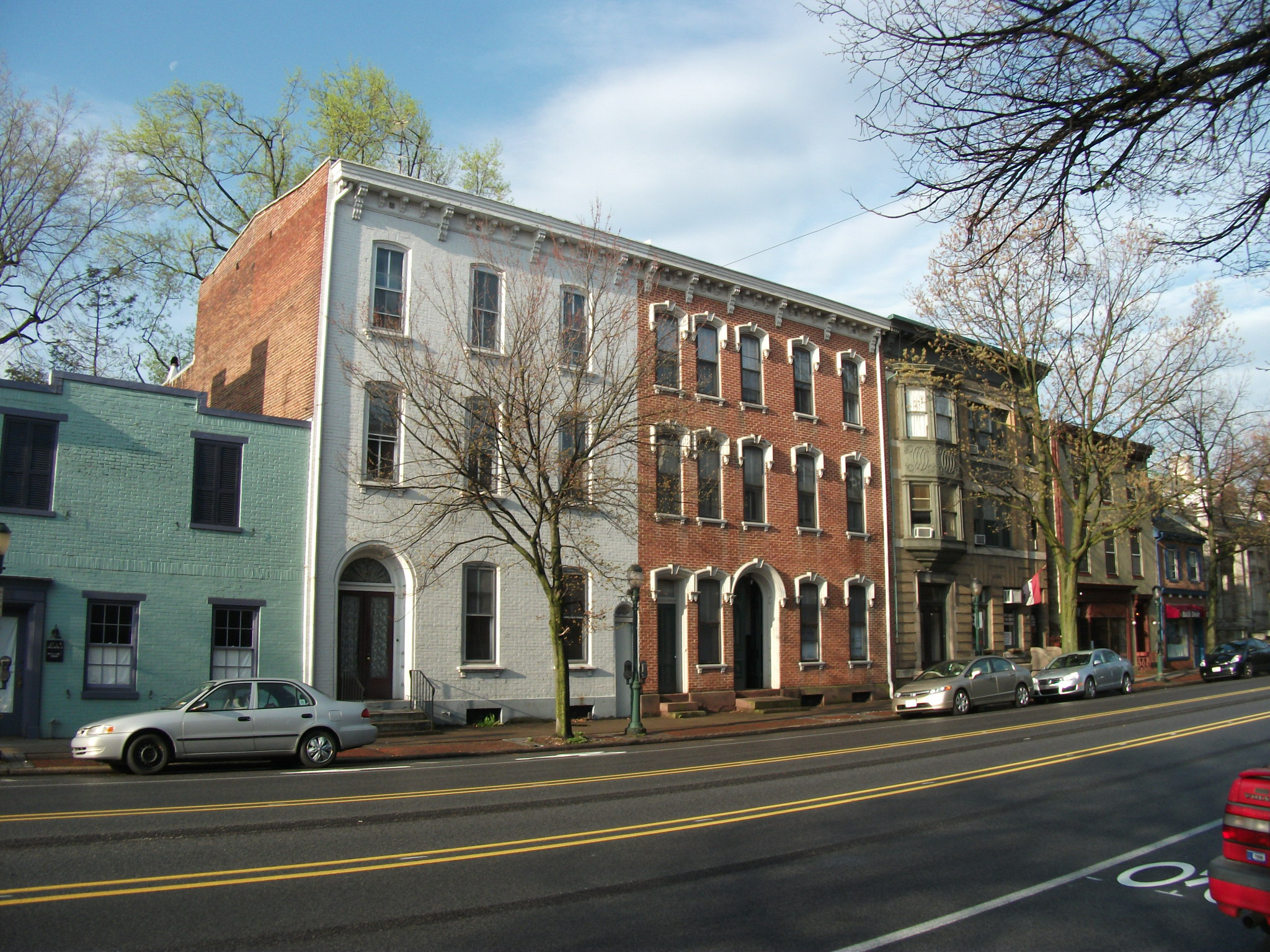
- Houses in the Carlisle Historic District, April 2011

- Location within Pennsylvania Location within the United States
- Location: Roughly bounded by Penn, East, Walnut and College Sts., Carlisle, Pennsylvania
- Coordinates: 40°12′08″N 77°11′04″W
- Area: 154 acres (62 ha)
- Built: 1751
- Architect: Rupp, Martin; Et al.
- Architectural style: Late 19th And 20th Century Revivals, Late Victorian, Federal
- NRHP reference No.: 79002214
- Added to NRHP: June 15, 1979

Carlisle Historic District is a national historic district located at Carlisle, Cumberland County, Pennsylvania. The district includes 1,011 contributing buildings, 1 contributing site, and 1 contributing object in the central business district and surrounding residential areas of Carlisle. Most of the contributing buildings date to the mid- to late-19th century, with a few dated to the 18th century. Residential areas include notable examples of the Late Victorian and Federal styles. Notable non-residential buildings include the Cumberland County Courthouse (1845-1846), St. John's Episcopal Church (c. 1890), Cumberland County Prison (c. 1865), First Lutheran Church (c. 1900), Tavern (c. 1810), First Presbyterian Church (c. 1760), Theatre (c. 1930), Fire House (c. 1890), Grace United Methodist Church (c. 1829), and St. Patrick's Church (c. 1892).

The district was added to the National Register of Historic Places in 1979.

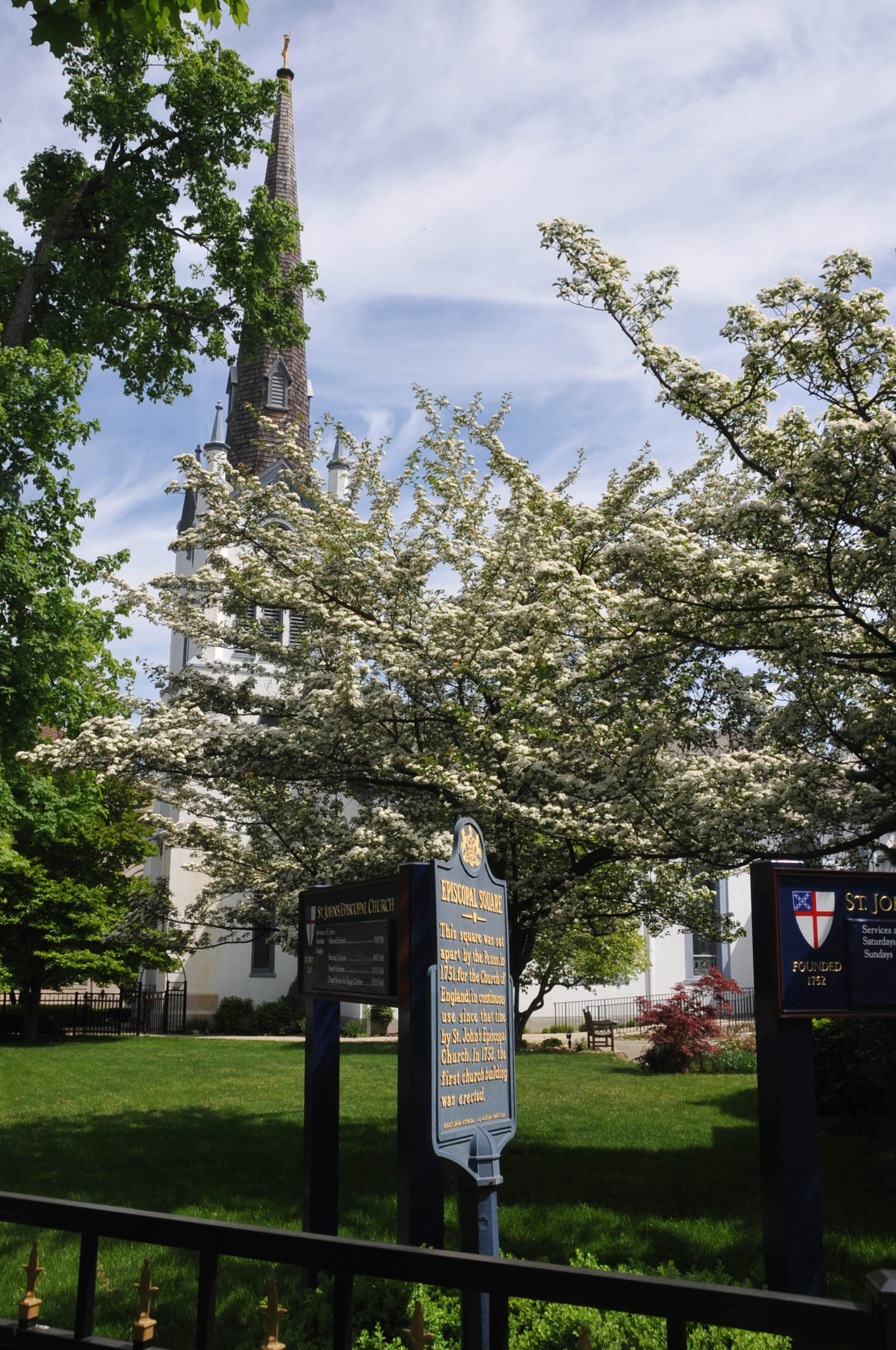
The area near St. John's Episcopal Church
