= Shepherdstown, Pennsylvania =

Unincorporated community in Pennsylvania, US

- Unincorporated community
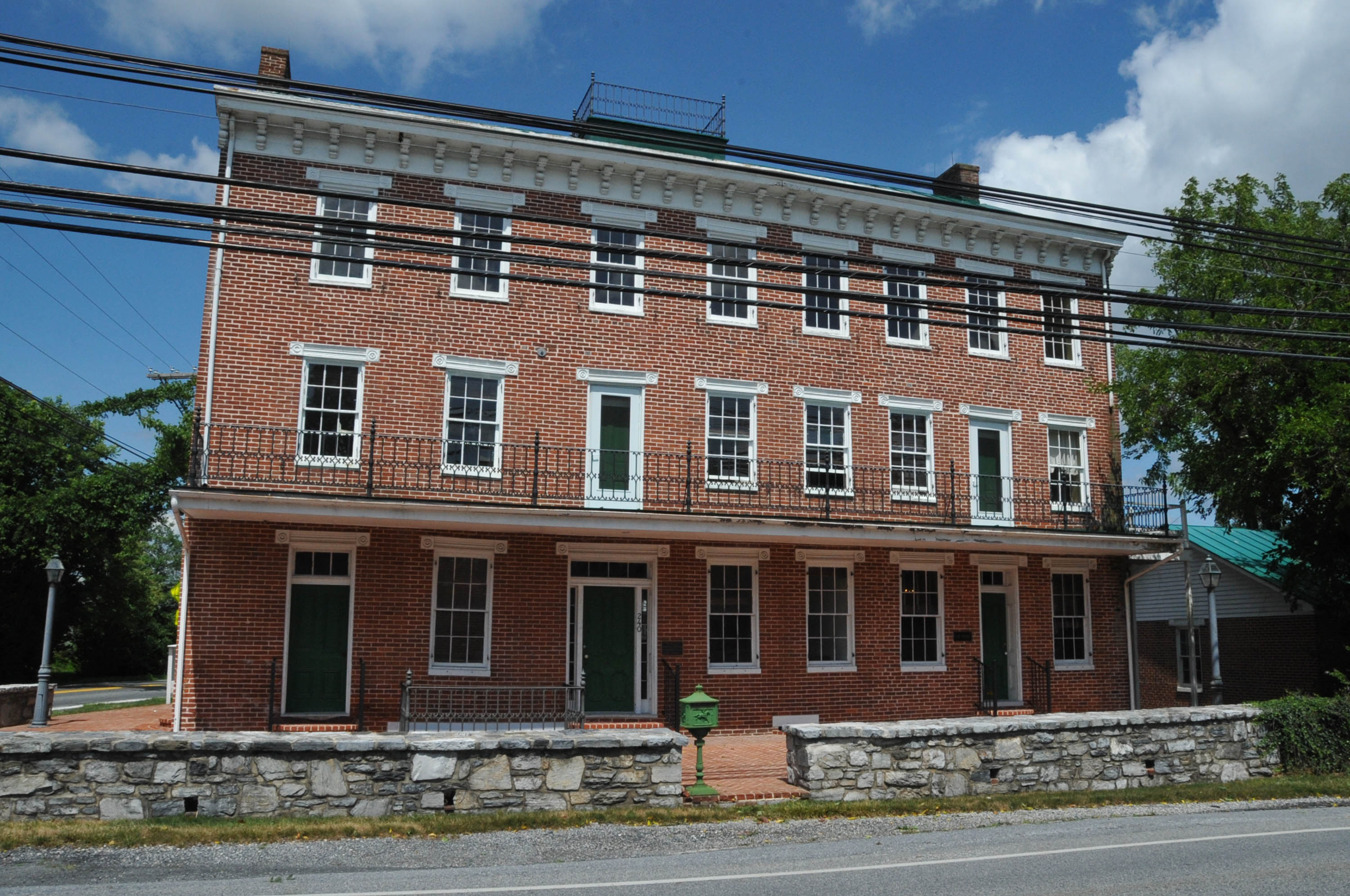
- Union Hotel

- Location within the state of Pennsylvania Shepherdstown (the United States)
- Coordinates: 40°10′39″N 76°59′29″W
- Country: United States
- State: Pennsylvania
- County: Cumberland
- Township: Upper Allen
- Time zone: UTC-5 (Eastern (EST))
  - Summer (DST): UTC-4 (EDT)

Shepherdstown is an unincorporated community that is located in Upper Allen Township, Cumberland County, Pennsylvania, United States. It is situated just south of Mechanicsburg and is home to the Union Hotel that was built in 1860 by Abraham Zook and listed on the National Register of Historic Places in 1989.

== History ==
Shepherdstown was founded in 1822 and named for William Shepherd.

Shepherdstown was once home to a one-room schoolhouse. On February 2, 1953, Shepherdstown Elementary School, then known as Upper Allen Elementary School, was constructed just northwest of the community, across the street from the former schoolhouse. The schoolhouse was sold and replaced with a modern home. This new school was a consolidation of many one-room schoolhouses in the district and opened with seven schoolhouse teachers assigned to grade-level classrooms. In 1965, this building was renamed Upper Allen I with the addition of Upper Allen II directly next to it. Upper Allen II was later renamed Upper Allen Elementary School with Upper Allen I being called Shepherdstown Elementary School because of its proximity to Shepherdstown. Both schools have undergone multiple additions over time, most notably extensive renovations in the late 2010s and early 2020s. They are operated by the Mechanicsburg Area School District and are now located on a campus alongside Mechanicsburg Middle School (opened in 2002) and Trails and Trees Environmental Center.

The Upper Allen Township Dog Park was developed along Old Hollow Road, next to Daybreak Church. It opened on June 30, 2018. The membership cost at the time of opening was $20/yr for residents and $50/yr for non-residents of Upper Allen Township.

Plans for the construction of 37 townhomes on the south side of Shepherdstown were submitted to Upper Allen Township on February 1, 2011. The townhome development, named Terraces at Shepherdstown, began construction in 2021.

In 2019, a mixed-use development named Shepherdstown Crossing (or Mills at Shepherdstown Crossing) was announced, to be located on the north end of Shepherdstown. The buildings were planned to have exteriors resembling early architecture of the American industrial revolution.

The plan for the development originally called for two mixed-use apartment buildings, two fast-food restaurants, and a three-story building. Plans to replace one fast food restaurant and the three-story building with a Chick-fil-A sparked debate among residents but were approved by Upper Allen Township commissioners on December 7, 2022. The restaurant successfully opened at 6:30 AM on January 11, 2024.

Shepherdstown Crossing also includes a forty-one-foot-high clock tower that was erected on December 13, 2022.

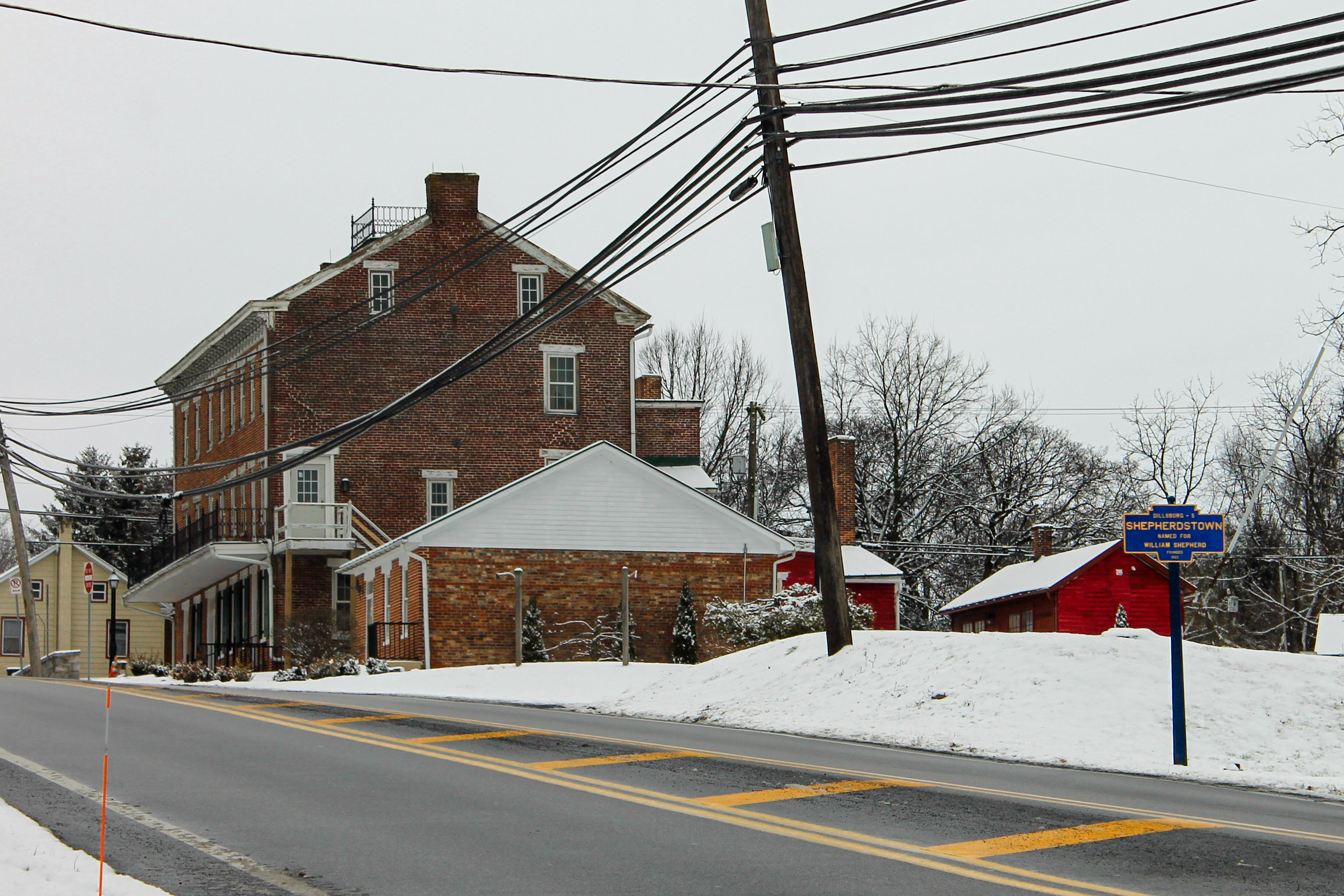
Looking south towards the Union Hotel at the northern end of Shepherdstown

== Notable people ==
- Ray Crist: American chemist
