= Upper Mifflin Township, Pennsylvania =

Township in Pennsylvania, US

Coordinates: 40°12′00″N 77°27′59″W

- Township
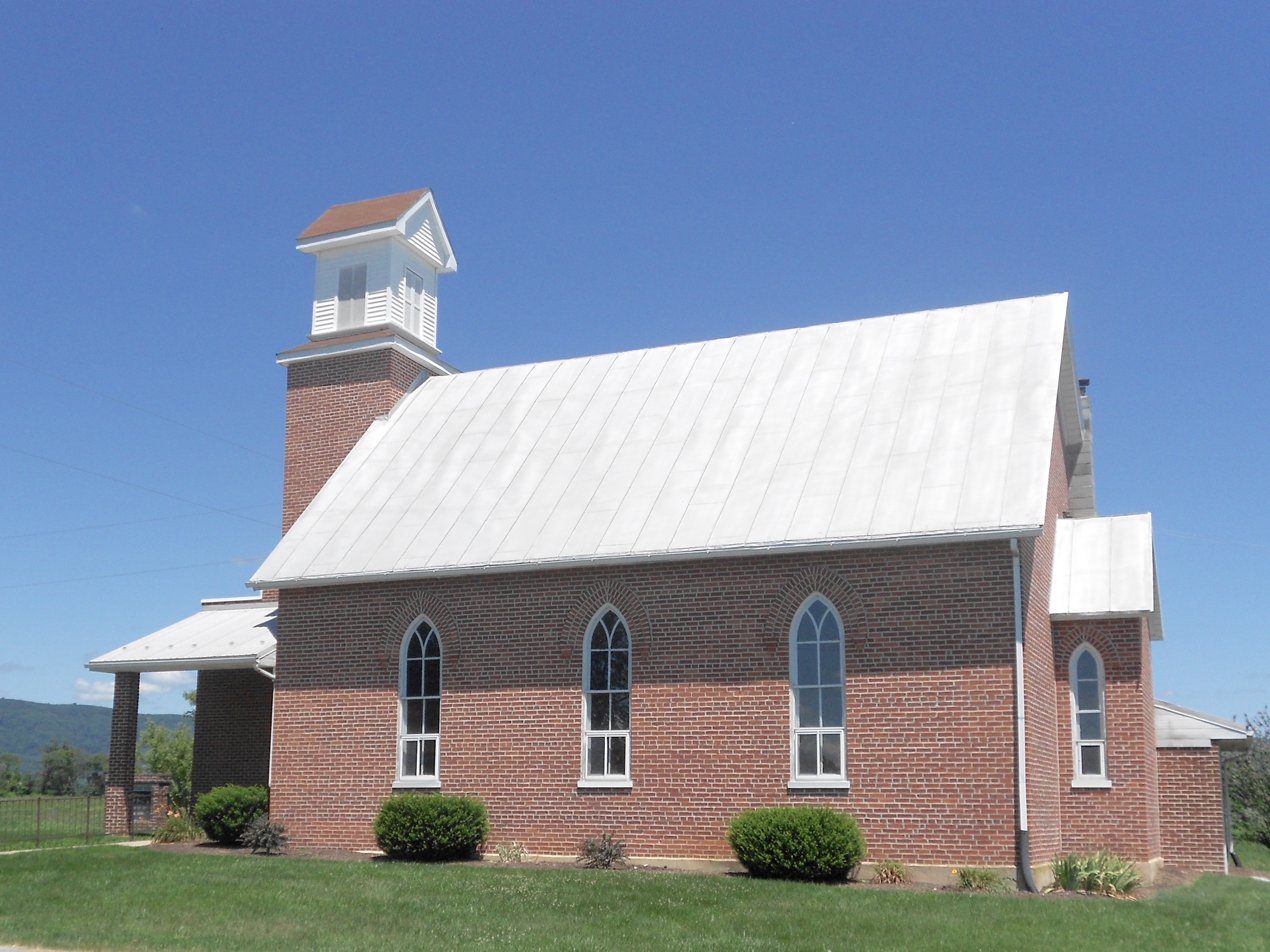
- Guisetown Bethany Church

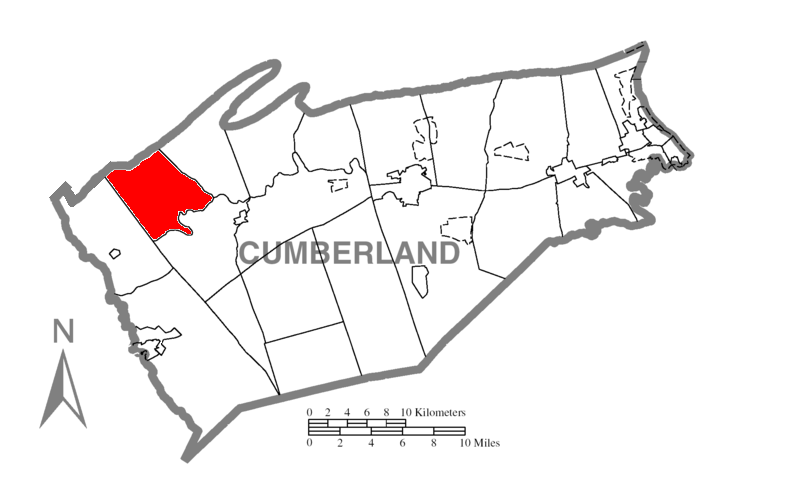
- Map of Cumberland County, Pennsylvania highlighting Upper Mifflin Township

- Map of Cumberland County, Pennsylvania
- Country: United States
- State: Pennsylvania
- County: Cumberland

Government
  - Type: Board of Supervisors

Area
  - Total: 22.11 sq mi (57.26 km^{2})
  - Land: 21.72 sq mi (56.25 km^{2})
  - Water: 0.39 sq mi (1.01 km^{2})

Population (2010)
  - Total: 1,304
  - Estimate (2016): 1,371
  - Density: 63.1/sq mi (24.37/km^{2})
- Time zone: UTC-5 (Eastern (EST))
  - Summer (DST): UTC-4 (EDT)
- Area code: 717
- FIPS code: 42-041-79152
- Website: www.uppermifflintownship.com

Historical population
Census	Pop.	Note	%±
2000	1,347		—
2010	1,304		−3.2%
2016 (est.)	1,371		5.1%
U.S. Decennial Census

Upper Mifflin Township is a township in Cumberland County, Pennsylvania, United States. The population was 1,304 at the 2010 census.

== Geography ==
The township is in northwestern Cumberland County, bordered to the northwest by Perry County, with the county line following the ridgecrest of Blue Mountain, the northern edge of the Cumberland Valley. The southern boundary of the township follows Conodoguinet Creek, a tributary of the Susquehanna River.

According to the United States Census Bureau, the township has a total area of 22.1 square miles (57.3 km^{2}), of which 21.7 square miles (56.2 km^{2}) is land and 0.4 square miles (1.0 km^{2}), or 1.76%, is water.

== Demographics ==
As of the census of 2000, there were 1,347 people, 452 households, and 380 families residing in the township. The population density was 61.6 inhabitants per square mile (23.8/km^{2}). There were 469 housing units at an average density of 21.5/sq mi (8.3/km^{2}). The racial makeup of the township was 98.59% White, 0.37% African American, 0.22% Native American, 0.07% Asian, and 0.74% from two or more races. Hispanic or Latino of any race were 0.45% of the population.

There were 452 households, out of which 40.7% had children under the age of 18 living with them, 73.9% were married couples living together, 6.9% had a female householder with no husband present, and 15.9% were non-families. 11.9% of all households were made up of individuals, and 3.8% had someone living alone who was 65 years of age or older. The average household size was 2.98 and the average family size was 3.25.

In the township the population was spread out, with 28.4 percent under the age of 18, 7.5% from 18 to 24, 32.9% from 25 to 44, 23.9% from 45 to 64, and 7.3% who were 65 years of age or older. The median age was 34 years. For every 100 females, there were 105.6 males. For every 100 females age 18 and over, there were 109.1 males.

The median income for a household in the township was $45,114, and the median income for a family was $46,176. Males had a median income of $31,581 versus $21,734 for females. The per capita income for the township was $15,660. About 5.8% of families and 8.7% of the population were below the poverty line, including 16.7% of those under age 18 and 3.6% of those age 65 or over.
