= City Beautiful movement =

Architectural and urban planning movement (1890s–1900s)

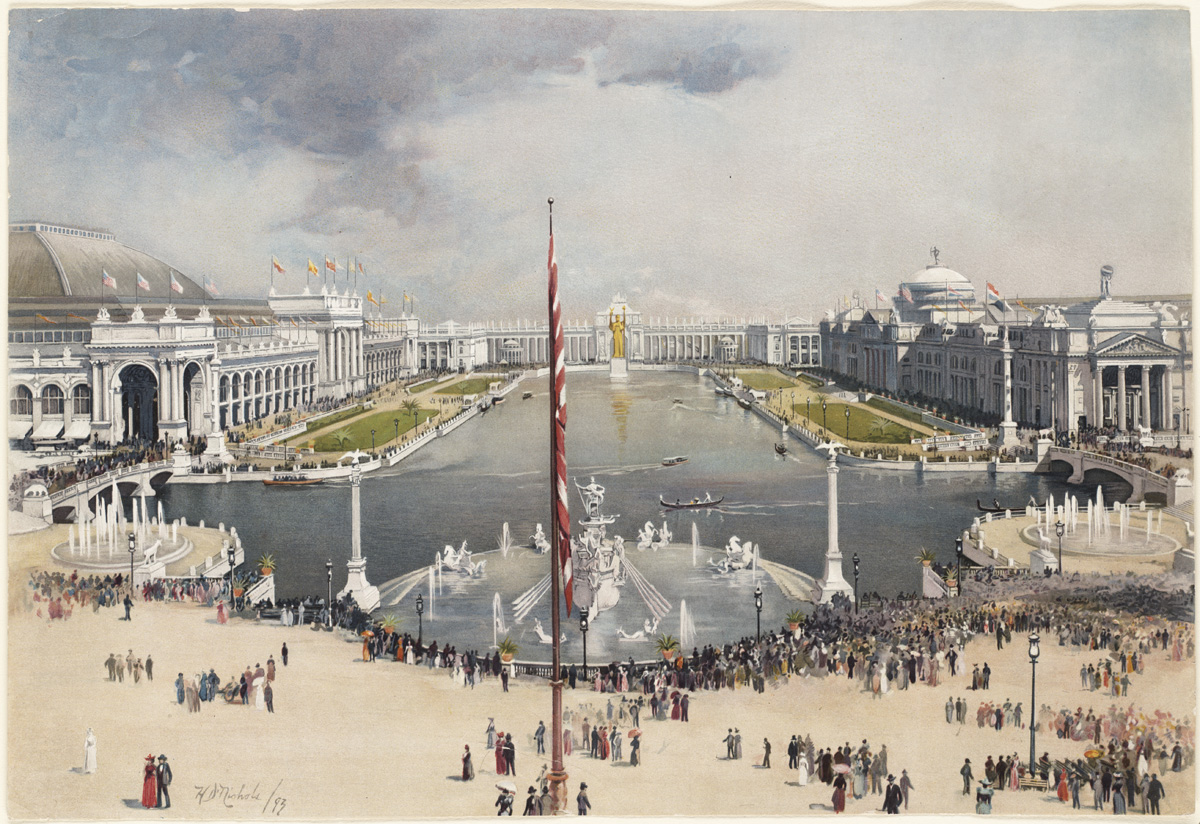
The World's Columbian Exposition in Chicago in 1893 is often credited with ushering in the City Beautiful movement.

The City Beautiful movement is a reform philosophy of North American architecture and urban planning that flourished during the 1890s and 1900s with the intent of introducing beautification and monumental grandeur in cities. It was part of the progressive social reform movement in North America under the leadership of the upper-middle class, which was concerned with poor living conditions in all major cities. The movement, which was originally associated mainly with Chicago, Cleveland, Detroit, Kansas City and Washington, D.C., promoted beauty not only for its own sake, but also to create moral and civic virtue among urban populations.

Advocates of the philosophy believed that such beautification could promote a harmonious social order that would increase the quality of life, while critics would complain that the movement was overly concerned with aesthetics at the expense of social reform. Urban studies theorist Jane Jacobs referred to the movement as an "architectural design cult."

== History ==
=== Origins and effect ===
The movement began in the United States in response to crowding in tenement districts, a consequence of high birth rates, increased immigration and internal migration of rural populations into cities. The movement flourished for several decades, and in addition to the construction of monuments, it also achieved great influence in urban planning that endured throughout the 20th century, particularly in regard to United States public housing projects. The "Garden City" movement in Britain influenced the contemporary planning of some newer suburbs of London, and there was cross-influence between the two aesthetics, one based in formal garden plans and urbanization schemes and the other, with its "semi-detached villas" evoking a more rural atmosphere.

=== Architectural idioms ===
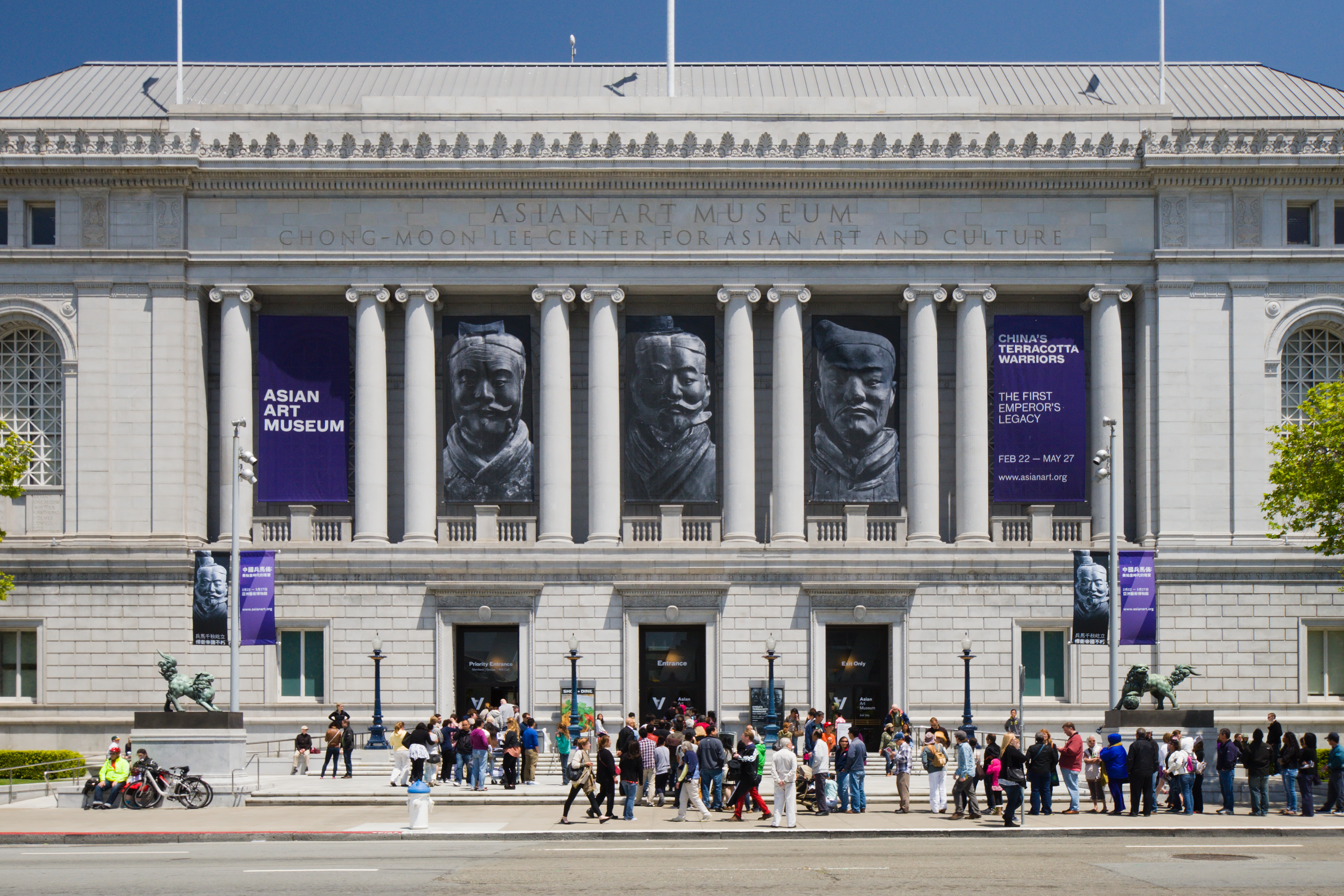
The movement is often associated with Beaux-Arts architecture

The particular architectural style of the movement borrowed mainly from the contemporary Beaux-Arts and neoclassical architectures, which emphasized the necessity of order, dignity, and harmony.

=== World's Columbian Exposition ===
The first large-scale elaboration of the City Beautiful occurred in Chicago at the 1893 World's Columbian Exposition. The planning of the exposition was directed by architect Daniel Burnham, who hired architects from the eastern United States, as well as the sculptor Augustus Saint-Gaudens, to build large-scale Beaux-Arts monuments that were vaguely classical with uniform cornice height. The exposition displayed a model city of grand scale, known as the "White City", with modern transport systems and no poverty visible. The exposition is credited with resulting in the large-scale adoption of monumentalism for American architecture for the next 15 years. Richmond, Virginia's Monument Avenue is one expression of this initial phase.

=== Louisiana Purchase Exposition ===
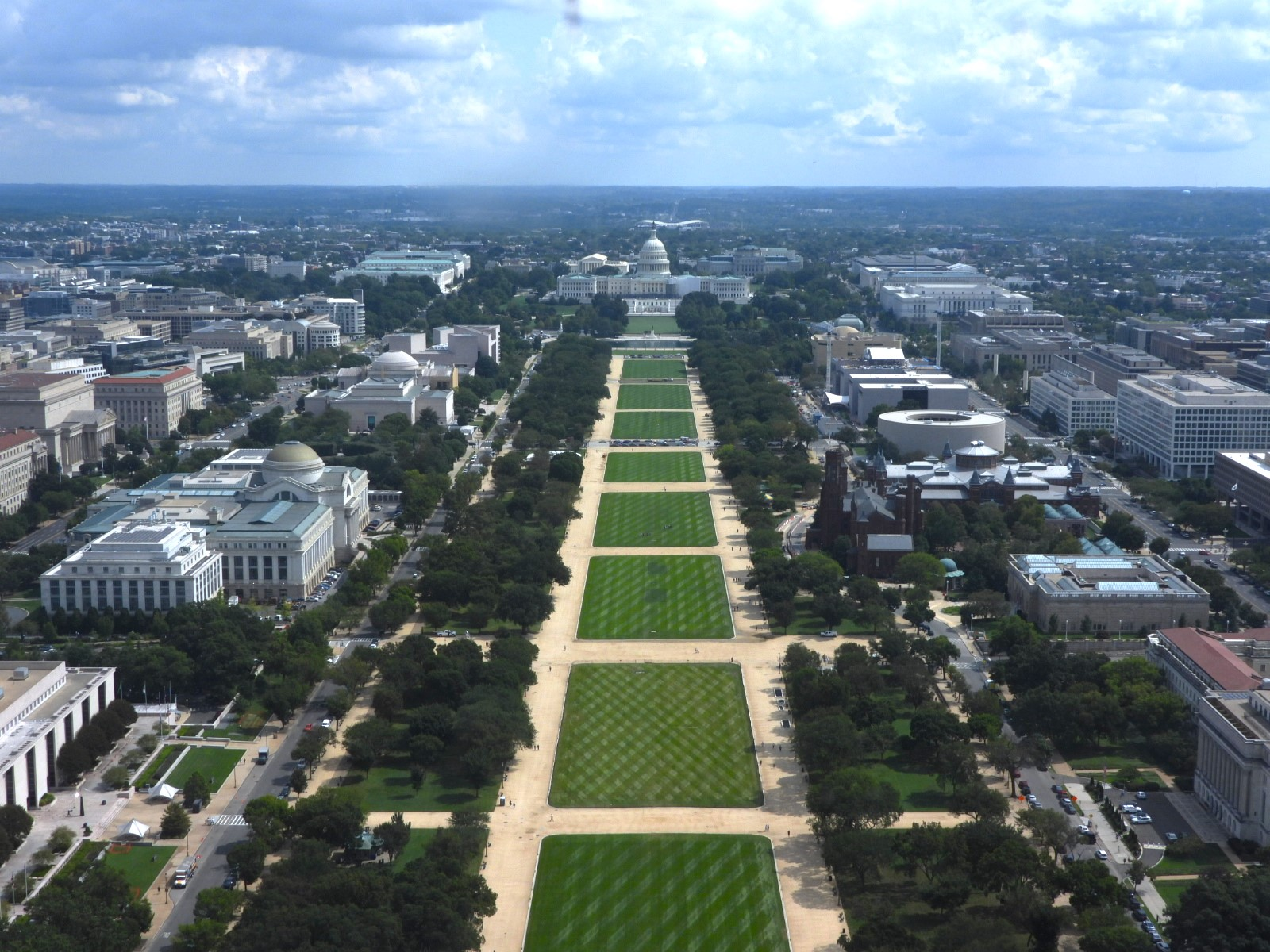
The Mall in Washington, D.C., with the United States Capitol in the background

The popularization begun by the World Columbian Exposition was increased by the Louisiana Purchase Exposition of 1904, held in St. Louis. Its commissioner of architects selected Franco-American architect Emmanuel Louis Masqueray to be Chief of Design. Within three years he designed the following fair buildings in the prevailing Beaux Arts: the Palace of Agriculture; the cascades and colonnades; the Palace of Forestry, Fish, and Game; the Palace of Horticulture; and the Palace of Transportation. All these were widely emulated in civic projects across the United States. Shortly after the fair opened in 1904, Masqueray resigned, having accepted an invitation from Archbishop John Ireland in St. Paul, Minnesota to design a cathedral there in the Beaux-Arts style. Other celebrated architects of the fair's buildings—notably Cass Gilbert who designed the Palace of the Fine Arts, now the Saint Louis Art Museum, applied City Beautiful ideas from the exposition throughout their careers.

=== McMillan Plan ===
An early use of the City Beautiful ideal with the intent of creating social order through beautification was the McMillan Plan (1902), named for Michigan Senator James McMillan. The plan emerged from the U.S. Senate Park Commission's redesigning of the monumental core of Washington, D.C., to commemorate the city's centennial and to fulfill unrealized aspects of the city plan of Pierre Charles L'Enfant a century earlier.

The Washington, D.C., planners, which included Burnham, Saint-Gaudens, Charles McKim of McKim, Mead, and White, and Frederick Law Olmsted Jr., visited many of the great cities of Europe. They hoped to make Washington, D.C., monumental and green like the European capitals of the era; they believed that state-organized beautification could lend legitimacy to government during a time of social disturbance in the United States. The essence of the plan surrounded the United States Capitol with monumental government buildings to replace "notorious slum communities". At the heart of the design was the creation of the National Mall and eventually included Burnham's Washington Union Station. The implementation of the plan was interrupted by World War I, but resumed after the war, culminating in the construction of the Lincoln Memorial in 1922.

=== Influence in other cities ===
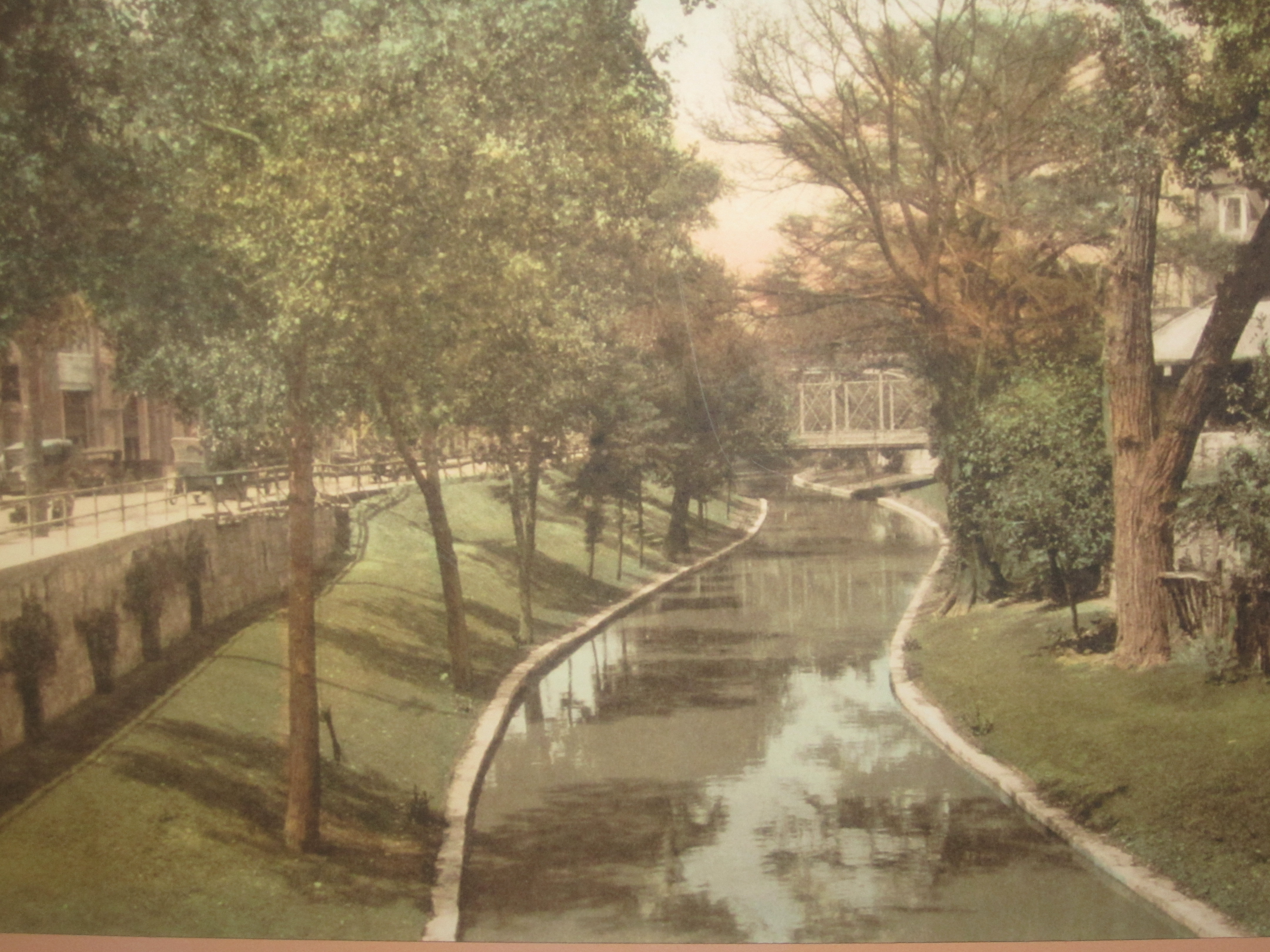
San Antonio prior to the 1920 establishment of the Riverwalk

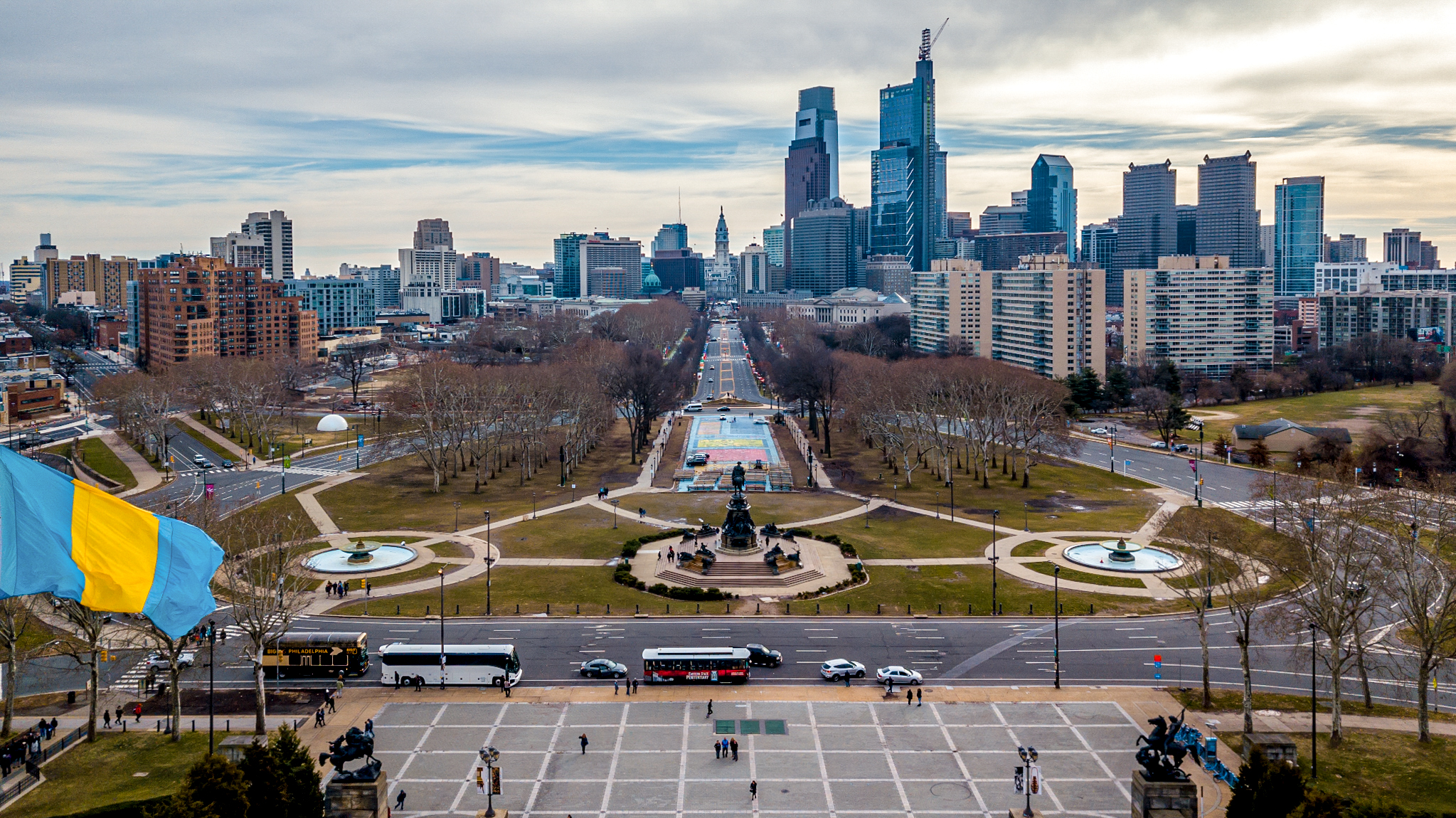
Benjamin Franklin Parkway in Philadelphia

The success of the City Beautiful philosophy in Washington, D.C., is credited with influencing subsequent plans for beautification of many other cities, including Chicago, Baltimore, Cleveland (The Mall), Columbus (with the axis along State Street from the Ohio State Capitol building east to the Metropolitan Library and west to the Scioto River), Des Moines, Denver, Detroit (the Cultural Center, Belle Isle and Outer Drive), Jersey City (City Hall, Hudson County Courthouse, Dickinson High School, Lincoln Park and Dr. Leonard J. Gordon Park), Madison (with the axis from the capitol building through State Street and to the University of Wisconsin campus), Montreal, New York City (notably the Manhattan Municipal Building), Philadelphia (the Benjamin Franklin Parkway museum district between Philadelphia City Hall and the Philadelphia Museum of Art), Pittsburgh (the Schenley Farms district in the Oakland neighborhood of parks, museums, and universities), San Antonio (San Antonio River development), San Francisco (manifested by its Civic Center), and the Washington State Capitol Campus in Olympia, and the University of Washington's Rainier Vista in Seattle. In Wilmington, Delaware, it inspired the creation of Rodney Square and the surrounding civic buildings. In New Haven, Connecticut, John Russell Pope developed a plan for Yale University that eliminated substandard housing and relocated the urban poor to the peripheries. Kansas City, Missouri, and Dallas undertook the installation of parkways and parks under the influence of the movement. The City Beautiful philosophy was also heavily incorporated into Florida cities, such as in Coral Gables and Orlando.

==== Chicago ====
Daniel Burnham's 1909 Plan of Chicago is considered one of principal documents of the City Beautiful movement. The plan featured a dynamic new civic center, axial streets, and a lush strip of parkland for recreation alongside the city's lakefront. Of these, only the lakefront park was implemented to any significant degree.

In 1913, the City of Chicago appointed a commission with a mandate to "make Chicago Beautiful." As part of the plan, the Pennsylvania Union Railroad Depot was to be moved to the west side of the city and replaced with a new modern depot. The West Side Property Owner’s Association was among those that objected. As reported by the Chicago Tribune, the association’s attorney Sidney Adler of Loeb & Adler said, "As I saw the beautiful picture of the city beautiful we will have fountains in West Madison Street, with poets and poetesses walking along Clinton, and the simple minded residents of the west side, after work is done, will take their gondolas and row on the limpid bosom of the Chicago River idlely strumming guitars."

==== Coral Gables ====
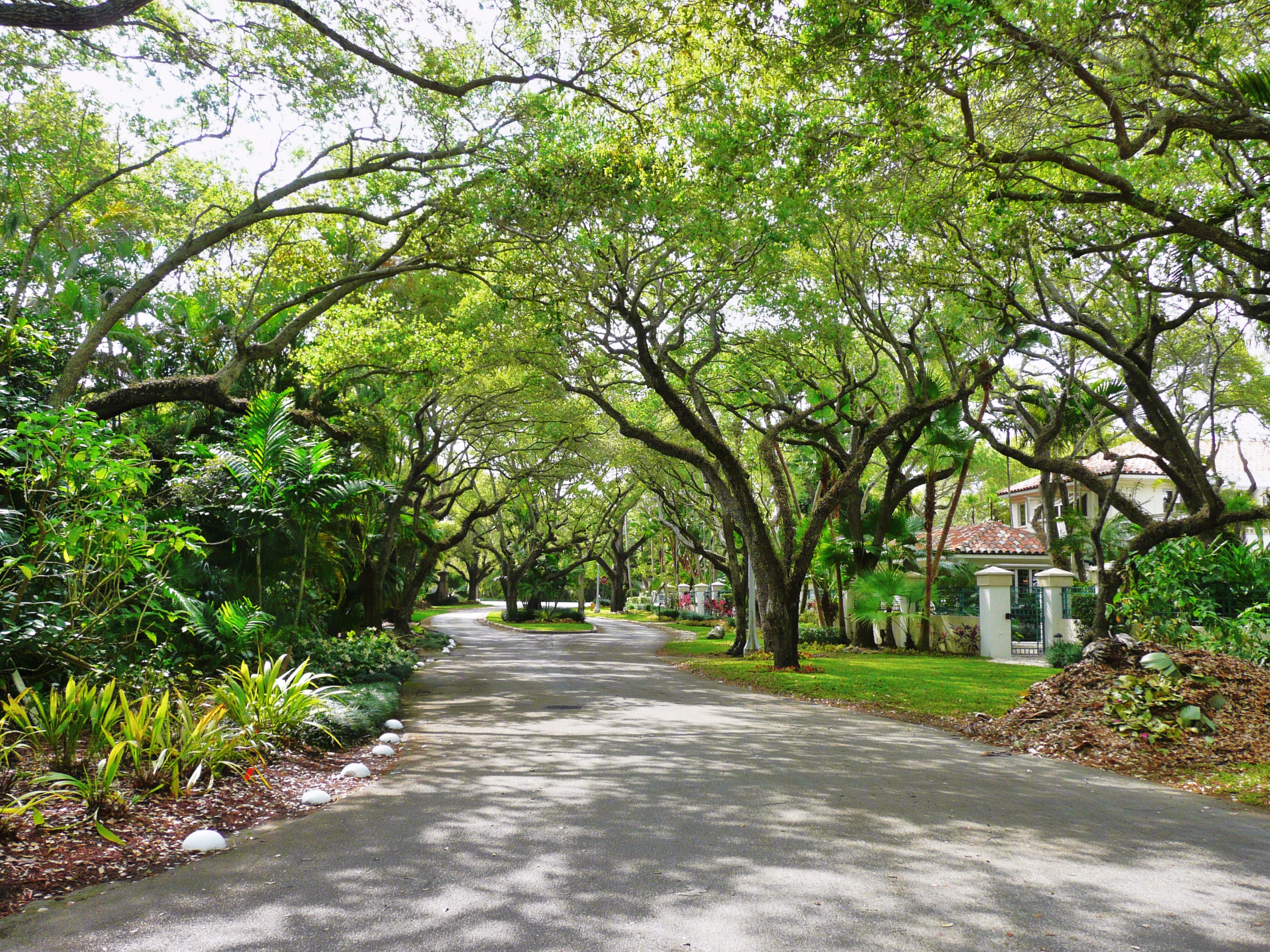
A typical residential street in Coral Gables, Florida

Planned out as a suburb of Miami in the early 1920s by George Edgar Merrick during the Florida land boom of the 1920s, Coral Gables was developed entirely upon the City Beautiful movement, with obelisks, fountains, and monuments seen in street roundabouts, parks, city buildings and around the city. Today, Coral Gables is one of Miami's most expensive suburban communities, long known for its strict zoning regulations which preserve the City Beautiful elements along with its Mediterranean Revival architecture style, which is prevalent throughout the city. Coral Gables has many parks and a heavy tree canopy with an urban forest planted largely in the 1920s.

==== Denver ====
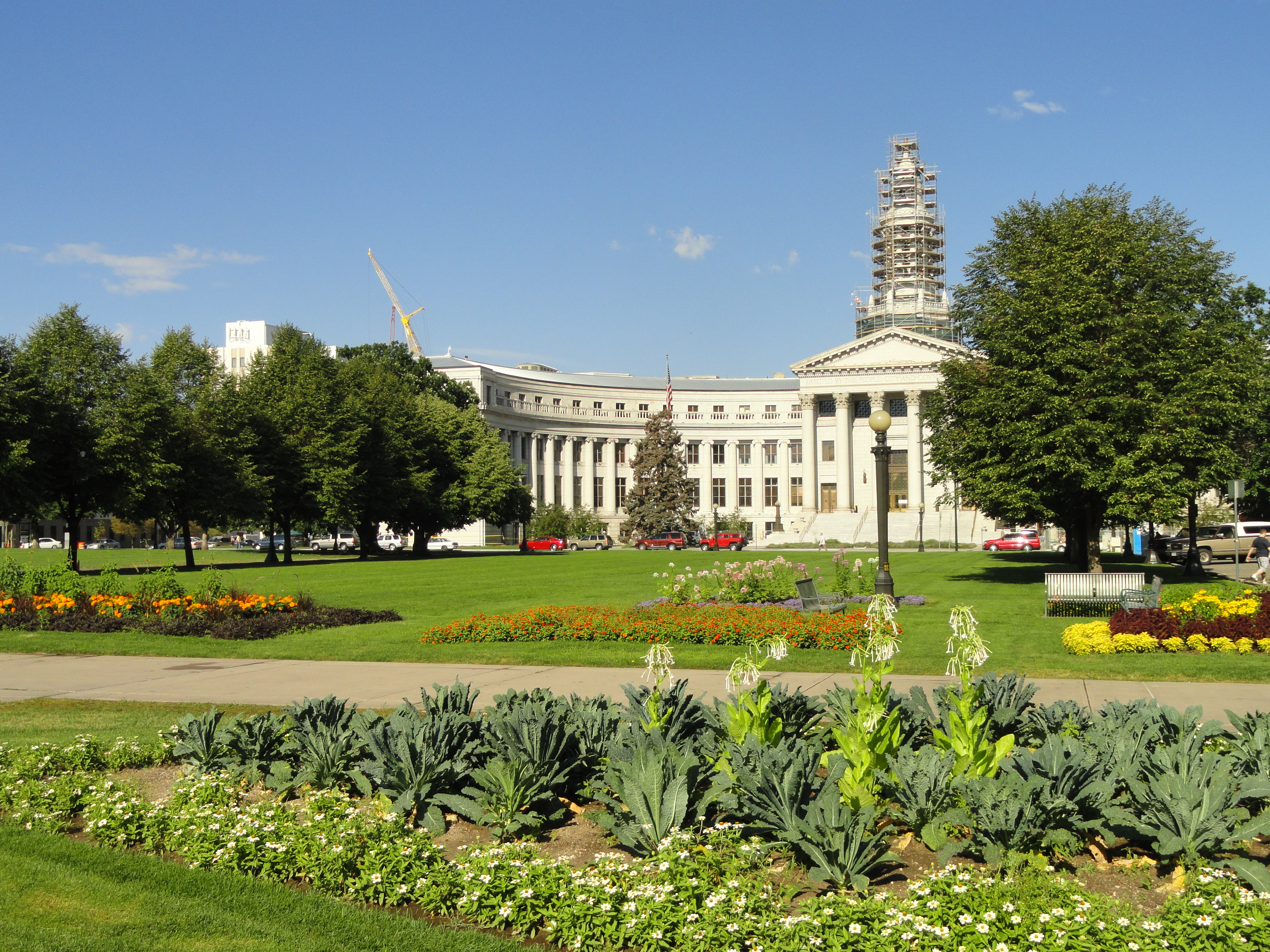
Denver Civic Center

In Denver, Colorado, Mayor Robert W. Speer endorsed City Beautiful planning, with a plan for a Civic Center, disposed along a grand esplanade that led to the Colorado State Capitol. The plan was partly realized, on a reduced scale, with the Greek amphitheater, Voorhies Memorial and the Colonnade of Civic Benefactors, completed in 1919. The Andrew Carnegie Foundation funded the Denver Public Library (1910), which was designed as a three-story Greek Revival temple with a colossal Ionic colonnade across its front; inside it featured open shelves, an art gallery and a children's room. Monuments and vistas were an essential feature of City Beautiful urban planning: in Denver, Paris-trained American sculptor Frederick MacMonnies was commissioned to design a monument marking the end of the Smoky Hill Trail. The bronze Indian guide he envisaged was vetoed by the committee and replaced with an equestrian Kit Carson.

==== Harrisburg ====
Harrisburg, Pennsylvania's movement of beautification and improvement was one of the early and more successful urban reform movements in the U.S. It began when local minded residents became convinced that their city was unattractive, unhealthy, and filthy, and lacked the appearance and facilities appropriate to its status as Pennsylvania’s state capital. The causes of the city's defects were well known: industrialization in the previous half century had left the city poorly planned with unpaved streets and undeveloped water management systems. Residents of Harrisburg suffered disease and illnesses caused by the lack of good filtration systems that could filter the sewage dumped by populations further up the Susquehanna River. A disastrous fire that consumed the state capitol in 1897 had spawned new conversation about the suitability of Harrisburg as a state capital.

The improvement campaign was sparked by a riveting speech of conservationist Mira Lloyd Dock to the Harrisburg Board of Trade on December 20, 1900. Dock wanted to publicly challenge the horrific conditions in Harrisburg, and she set out to gain public sentiment in support of changing them. Dock’s speech was titled "The City Beautiful" or "Improvement Work at Home and Abroad", and this was the starting point for Harrisburg’s city improvements. Dock’s contemporary and closest ally in her drive for urban beautification was J. Horace McFarland, who was the president of the American Civic Association. With McFarland and Dock working together, they were able to push the process of municipal improvement in Harrisburg by convincing prominent community leaders to donate money, and by gathering the support of the majority of citizens. In April 1901, the Harrisburg Telegraph, a city newspaper, published a front-page article on the city’s problems, which stressed Dock’s message of beautification and recreation, paved streets, clean water, a city hall, land for parks, and a covered sewer interceptor along the river. The following February 1901, the population voted in favor of a bond issue that funded $1.1 million in new constructions and city planning. These improvements, combined with a new state capitol building in 1906, quickly transformed Harrisburg into a proud modern city by 1915.

==== Louisville ====
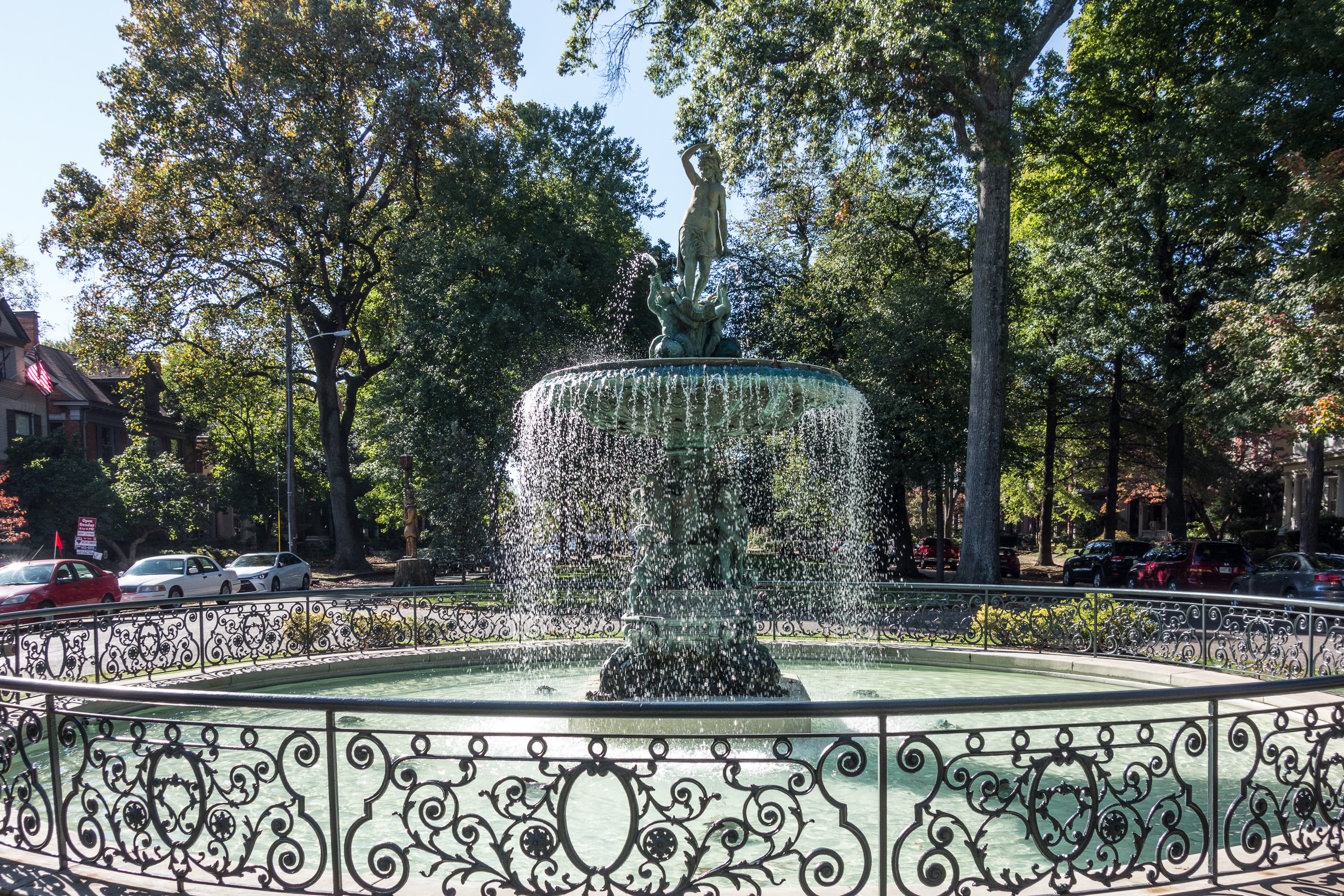
The Fountain in Louisville's St. James Court was installed in 1892.

After the Southern Exposition of 1883–1887, Louisville grew rapidly with the advent of the Industrial Revolution. Specifically, the Old Louisville neighborhood, that was planned and designed by Frederick Law Olmsted in the image of the City Beautiful movement, became the largest Victorian neighborhood in the United States. Central Park sits in the middle of Old Louisville and is home to an annual free public Shakespeare festival. Adjacent to the park is the St. James–Belgravia Historic District which hosts the annual St. James Court Art Show every October. South of St. James Court is the University of Louisville's Belknap Campus which is home to Grawemeyer Hall and the University of Louisville Brandeis School of Law. Each of these areas of Louisville display the features of beautification and monumental grandeur that typified the City Beautiful movement of the 1890s.

==== Memphis ====
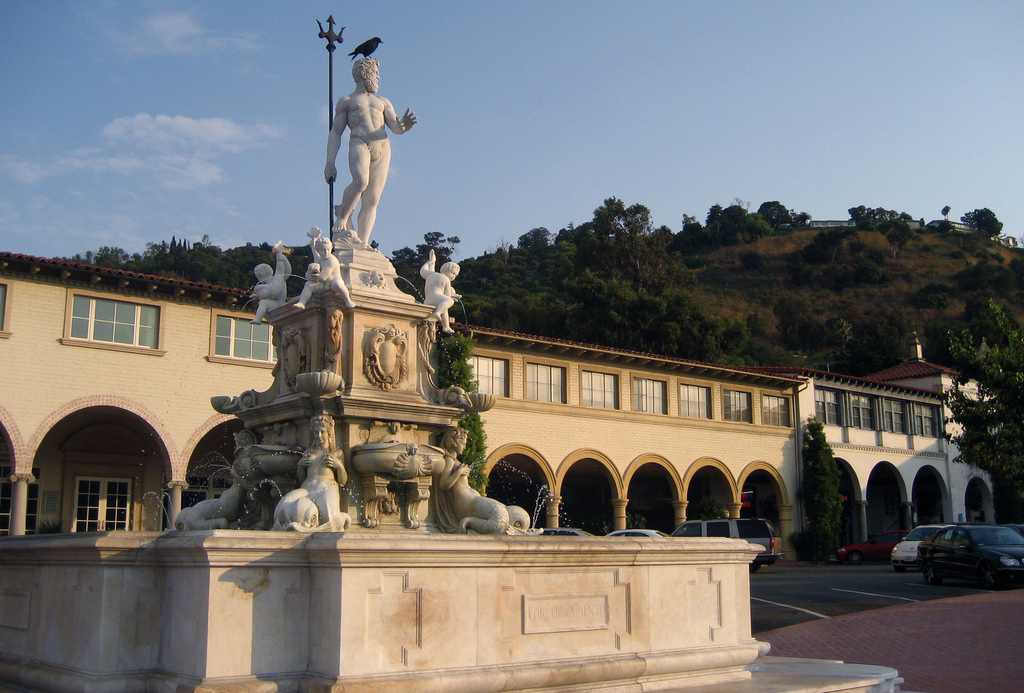
Neptune Fountain in Palos Verdes Estates, California

In Memphis, Tennessee, the City Beautiful Commission was officially established by a city ordinance on July 1, 1930, making it the first and oldest beautification commission in the nation. It was the brainchild of the mayor, E. H. Crump. The first Commission was appointed and had operating expenses of $1,500. A small office was set up in The Nineteenth Century Club. Mrs. E. G. Willingham was chosen as chairman and Mrs. William B. Fowler served as vice chairman. In 1935, the Riverside Drive project was dedicated. Costing nearly $1,000,000 (largely WPA funds) the City Beautiful Commission landscaped the bluffs with crape myrtle, redbuds, magnolias, dogwoods and Paul Scarlet roses. White roses were planted at each guardrail post. In 1936, Mrs. William B. Fowler became chairman of the City Beautiful Commission and served for many years. City Beautiful grew under her leadership and soon had to relocate to larger headquarters. Through the efforts of City Beautiful, Memphis gained the title of cleanest city in Tennessee in 1940, 1941, 1942, 1943, 1944, 1945 and 1946. Memphis also received the Ernest T. Trigg "Nation’s Cleanest City" award in 1948, 1949, 1950 and 1951. During this time, volunteers were organized into Wards and Block Clubs with Ward Chairmen and Block Captains. The City Beautiful staff grew to include 30 inspectors by 1954 who worked through these organizations to identify and improve eyesores. Memphis participated with the American Coatings Association headquartered in Washington, D.C. In 1978, the Commission was reorganized, eliminating the field inspectors. In February 1989, the Commission moved to its present location at The Massey House in Victorian Village, Memphis.

==== Orlando ====
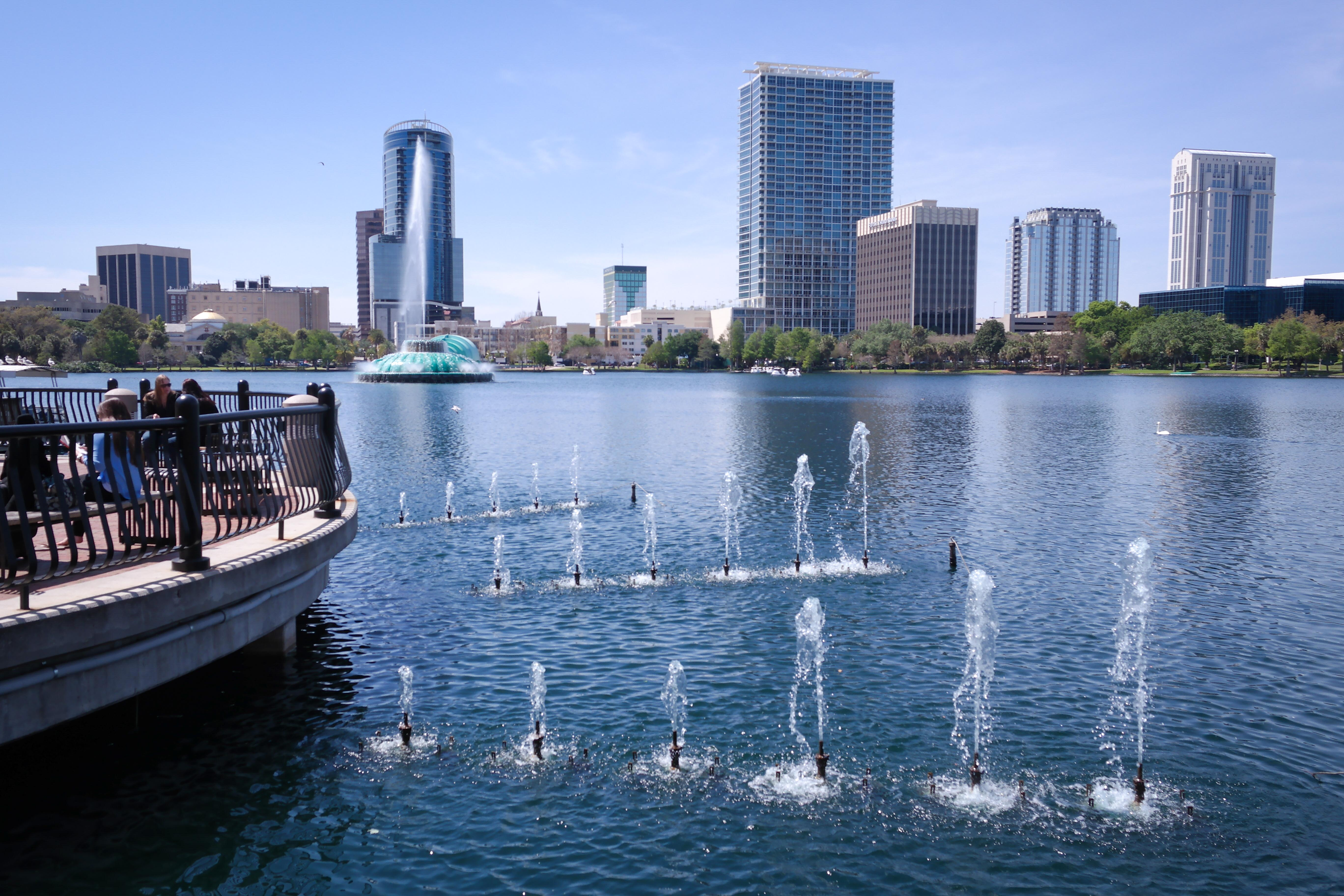
Lake Eola in Downtown Orlando

According to the author Even Bacon in his book “Orlando: A Centennial History,” Orange County, Florida, sent a group of agricultural exhibitors to the 1893 World’s Columbian Exposition in Chicago. This greatly influenced city officials and planners at the turn of the century in incorporating diverse trees (such as oak trees, Palm trees, and azaleas) and other natural fixtures into the city's design.

The arrival of the middle-aged couple William S. and Jessie Branch from Parker, South Dakota, in 1903 led to the printing of brochures extolling the virtues of Florida and its climate, highlighting from the Orlando area. Five years later, the city sponsored a contest to replace Orlando’s nickname, which was previously “Phenomenal City”, in response to the city's beautifications efforts. Out of the many suggestions, the proposed nickname “The City Beautiful” was chosen and adopted.

The city has since continued with the preservation and revitalization of its natural habitat in its city design, notably at Lake Eola Park and at Leu Gardens.

==== Palos Verdes Estates ====
In the 1920s, Palos Verdes Estates, California, was established as a master planned community by noted American landscape architect Frederick Law Olmsted Jr. The community was designed as a "City Beautiful." Among its early structures were the buildings comprising Malaga Cove Plaza, designed in a Mediterranean Revival style popular with the City Beautiful movement.

==== Toronto, Canada ====
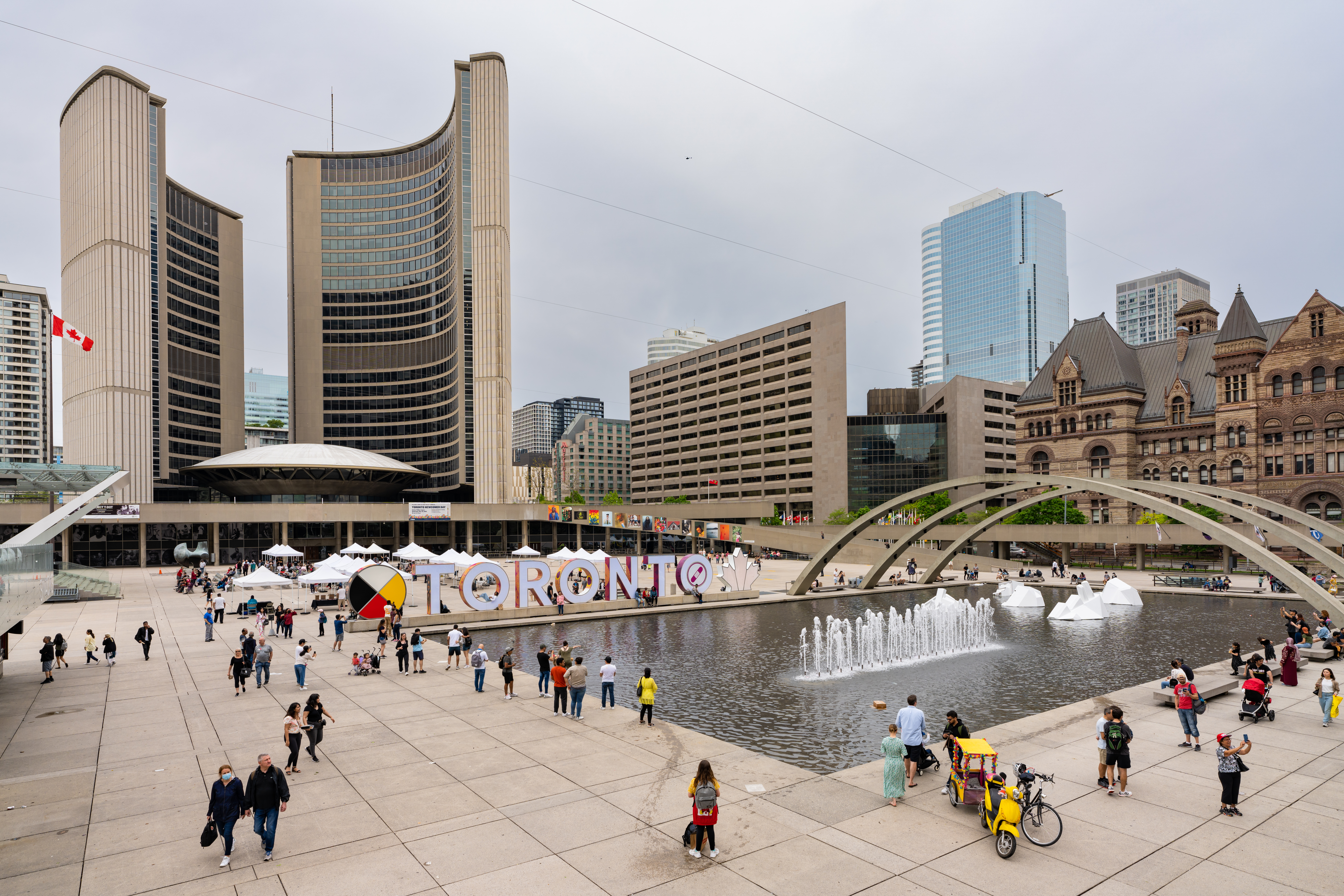
Nathan Phillips Square in Toronto, Canada

The City Beautiful movement inspired plans to develop a civic square with monumental buildings; a ceremonial avenue from the train station; and an extension of the grand boulevard of University Avenue. Of these, the civic square became Nathan Phillips Square, with its associated monumental buildings -- the new City Hall, a new courthouse and a new hotel. The ceremonial avenue from the train station to City Hall was never built. University Avenue was extended, but a promised "Vimy Circle" with monumental buildings was not built. Plans were interrupted twice -- by the First World War, and later by the Great Depression.

== In Australia ==
Both European and North American cities provided models for the Australian City Beautiful movement. A combination of elements about 1900 also influenced the movement:

- It was thought that Australia, being a country that was relatively newly settled by Europeans, had wasted an opportunity to design cities comprehensively and aesthetically.
- Australian cities were seen as lacking beauty and civic pride.
- The lack of architectural features, and extensive street advertising, were also concerns. This was attributed to "materialism, apathy, short-sightedness, political interference and indifference".
- Utopian city plans were another influence on the Australian City Beautiful movement. A better Brisbane, for example, was described by Louis Esson and illustrated by Lloyd Rees with a Parisian influence.

However, City Beautiful was not solely concerned with aesthetics. The term ‘beautility’ derived from the American city beautiful philosophy, which meant that the beautification of a city must also be functional. Beautility, including the proven economic value of improvements, influenced Australian town planning.

There were no formal city beautiful organisations that led this movement in Australia; rather it was influenced by communications among professionals and bureaucrats, in particular architect-planners and local government reformers. In the early Federation era some influential Australians were determined that their cities be progressive and competitive. Adelaide was used as an Australian example of the "benefits of comprehensive civic design" with its ring of parklands. Beautification of the city of Hobart, for example, was considered a way to increase the city’s popularity as a tourist destination.

=== Canberra ===
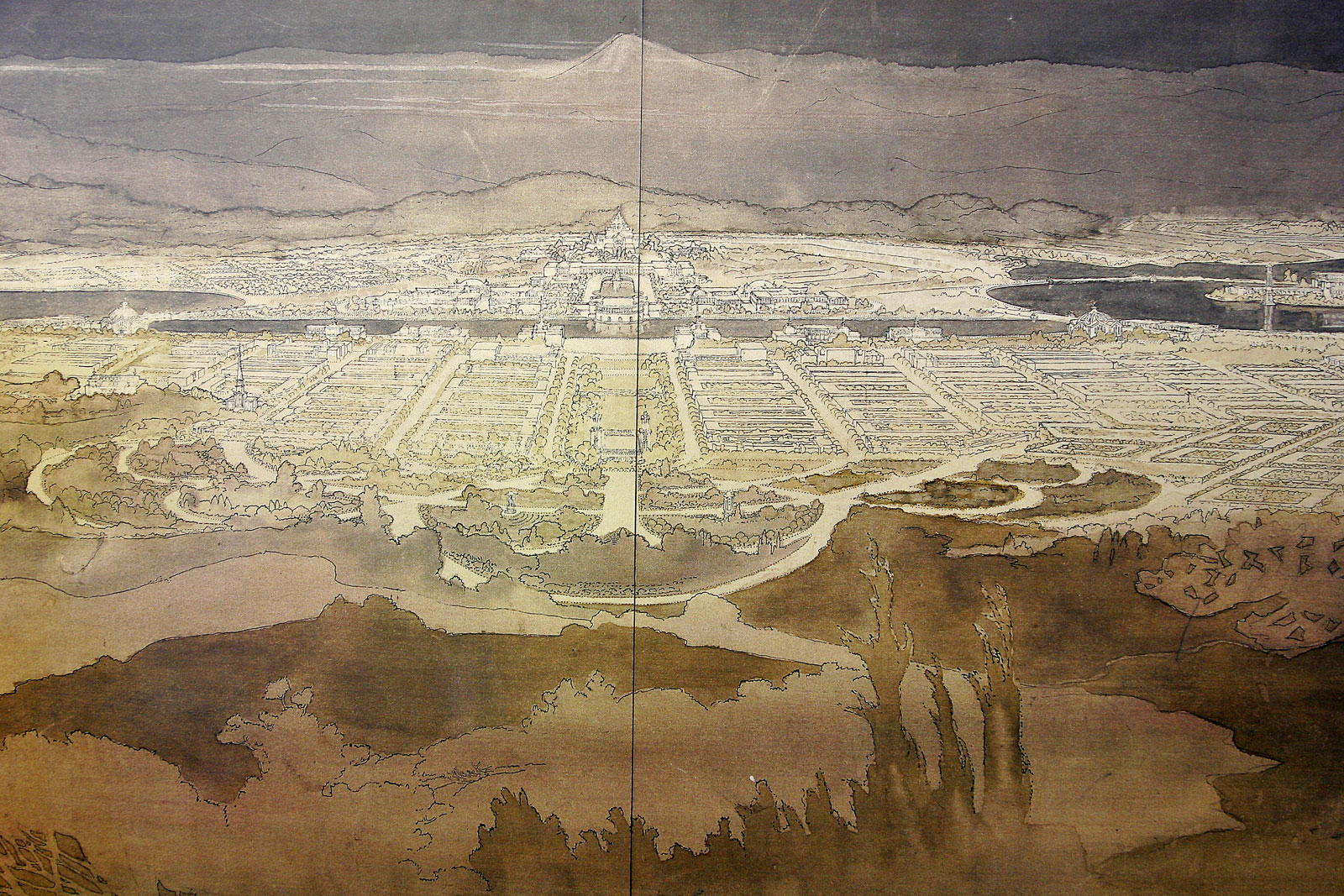
Marion Burley Griffin's plan for Canberra

Walter Burley Griffin incorporated City Beautiful principles for his design for Canberra. Griffin was influenced by Washington, D.C., "with grand axes and vistas and a strong central focal point: with specialised centres and, being a landscape architect, used the landscape to complement this layout. John Sulman, however, was Australia's "leading proponent" of the City Beautiful movement and, in 1921, wrote the book An Introduction to Australian City Planning. Both the City Beautiful and the Garden City philosophies were represented by Sulman’s "geometric or contour controlled" designs of the circulatory road systems in Canberra. The widths of pavements were also reduced and vegetated areas were increased, such as planted road verges.

=== Melbourne ===
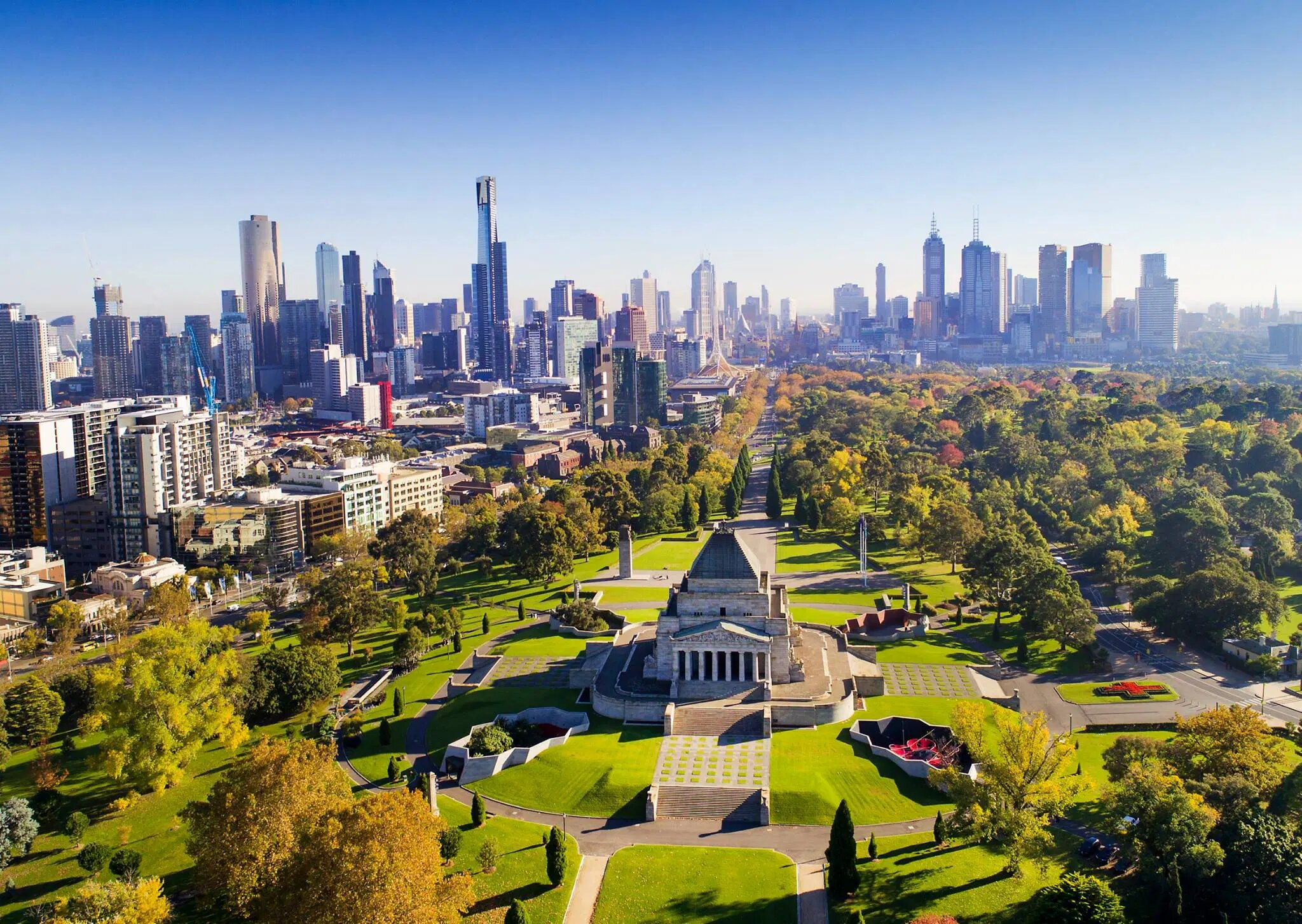
The skyline of Melbourne and the Shrine of Remembrance in Kings Domain

Melbourne’s grid plan was considered dull and monotonous by some people, and so the architect William Campbell designed a blueprint for the city. The main principle behind this were diagonal streets, providing sites for new and comprehensive architecture and for special buildings. The designs of Paris and Washington were major inspirations for this plan.

=== City Beautiful in Australia today ===
World War I prolonged the City Beautiful movement in Australia, where more memorials were erected than in any other country. Although City Beautiful, or artistic planning, became a part of comprehensive town planning, the Great Depression of the 1930s largely ended this fashion.

== See also ==
- Defensible space
- Garden city movement
- Mira Lloyd Dock and the Progressive Era Conservation Movement
