= History of Harrisburg, Pennsylvania =

Aspect of US history

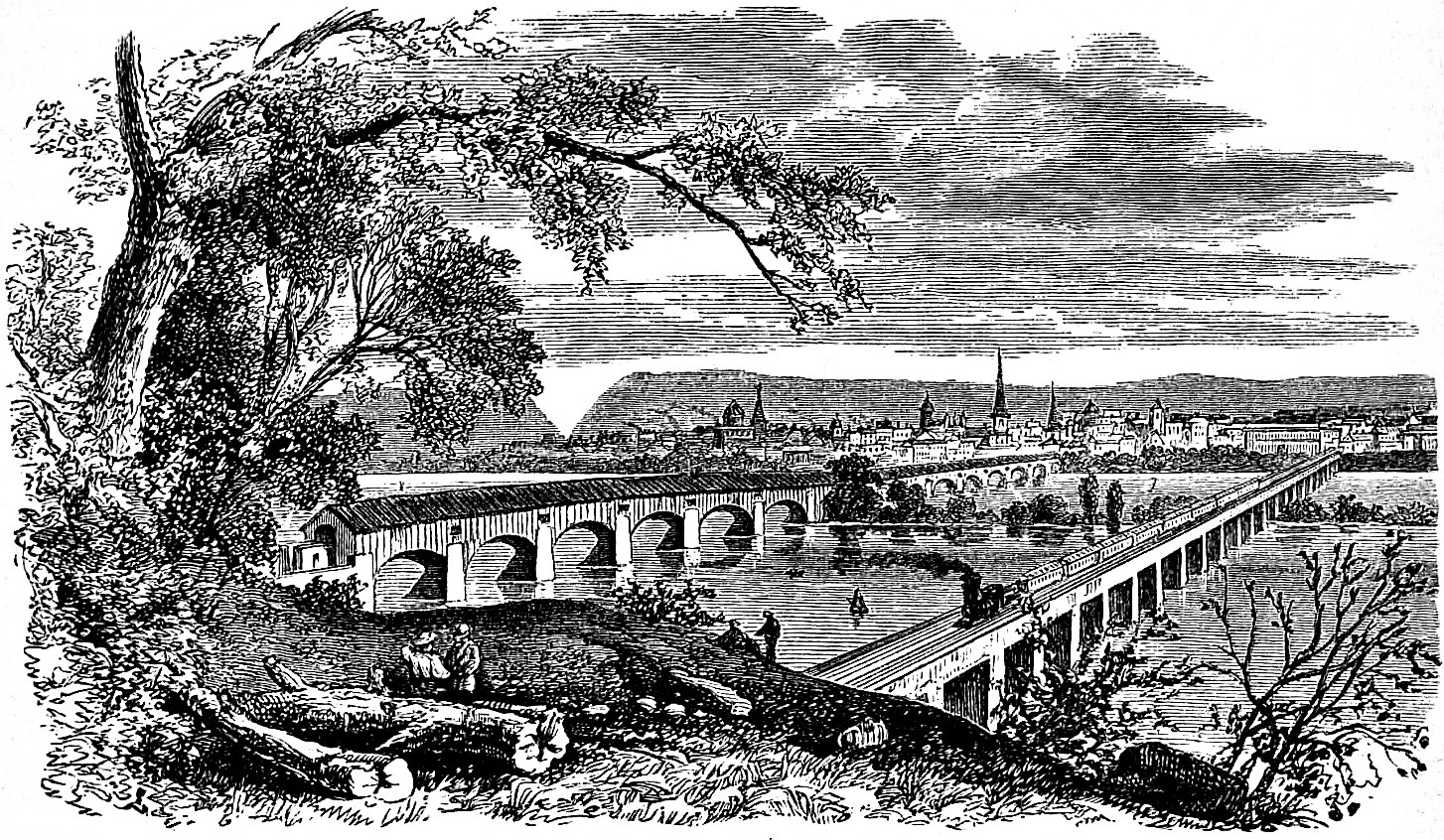
Harrisburg, as seen from the west bank of the Susquehanna River in 1879

The history of Harrisburg, the state capital of the Commonwealth of Pennsylvania, United States, has played a key role in the development of the nation's industrial history from its origins as a trading outpost to the present. Harrisburg has played a critical role in American history during the Westward Migration, the American Civil War, and the Industrial Revolution. For part of the 19th century, the building of the Pennsylvania Canal and later the Pennsylvania Railroad allowed Harrisburg to become one of the most industrialized cities in the Northeast.

== Early settlement ==
The site along the Susquehanna River in which Harrisburg is located is thought to have been inhabited by Native Americans as early as 3000 BC. Known to the Native Americans as "Peixtin", or "Paxtang", the area was an important resting place and crossroads for Native American traders, as the trails leading from the Delaware to the Ohio and from the Potomac to the Upper Susquehanna intersected there. The first European contact with Native Americans in Pennsylvania was made by the Englishman Captain John Smith, who journeyed from Virginia up the Susquehanna River in 1608 and visited with the Susquehanna tribe. The Shawnees, a nomadic tribe and members of the Algonquian nation, came to the Susquehanna Valley from the southwest in the 1690s. The Swedes and the French used the Susquehanna River as a route during their explorations of the Middle Atlantic Region, but did not settle here.

In 1719, John Harris, Sr., an English trader, settled here and 14 years later secured grants of 800 acres (3.2 km^{2}) in the vicinity. The same year, Harris was granted a license to operate a ferry, and the place was long afterwards known as Harris's Ferry. In 1785, John Harris, Jr., made plans to lay out a town on his father's land, which he named Harrisburg. In the spring of 1785, the town was formally surveyed by William Maclay, who was a son-in-law of John Harris, Jr. The following year, the city was temporarily renamed Louisburg in honor of Louis XVI, who had been helpful during the American Revolution. However, John Harris, Jr. refused to sell the land for the county seat under those terms, and it was agreed that the new name would be Harrisburg in honor of his father.

A noted gathering of anti-Federalists, the Harrisburg Conference (or Convention), met here on September 3, 1788, to deliberate on the new Federal Constitution. The meeting was well attended and adopted resolutions carrying 12 amendments to the constitution to be presented for action to the Pennsylvania legislature in the form of a petition, but the petition was never formally presented.

Harrisburg was incorporated in 1791, and it was named the Pennsylvania state capital in October 1812. The cornerstone for the new Capitol building was laid in 1819 by Governor William Findlay.

== 19th century ==
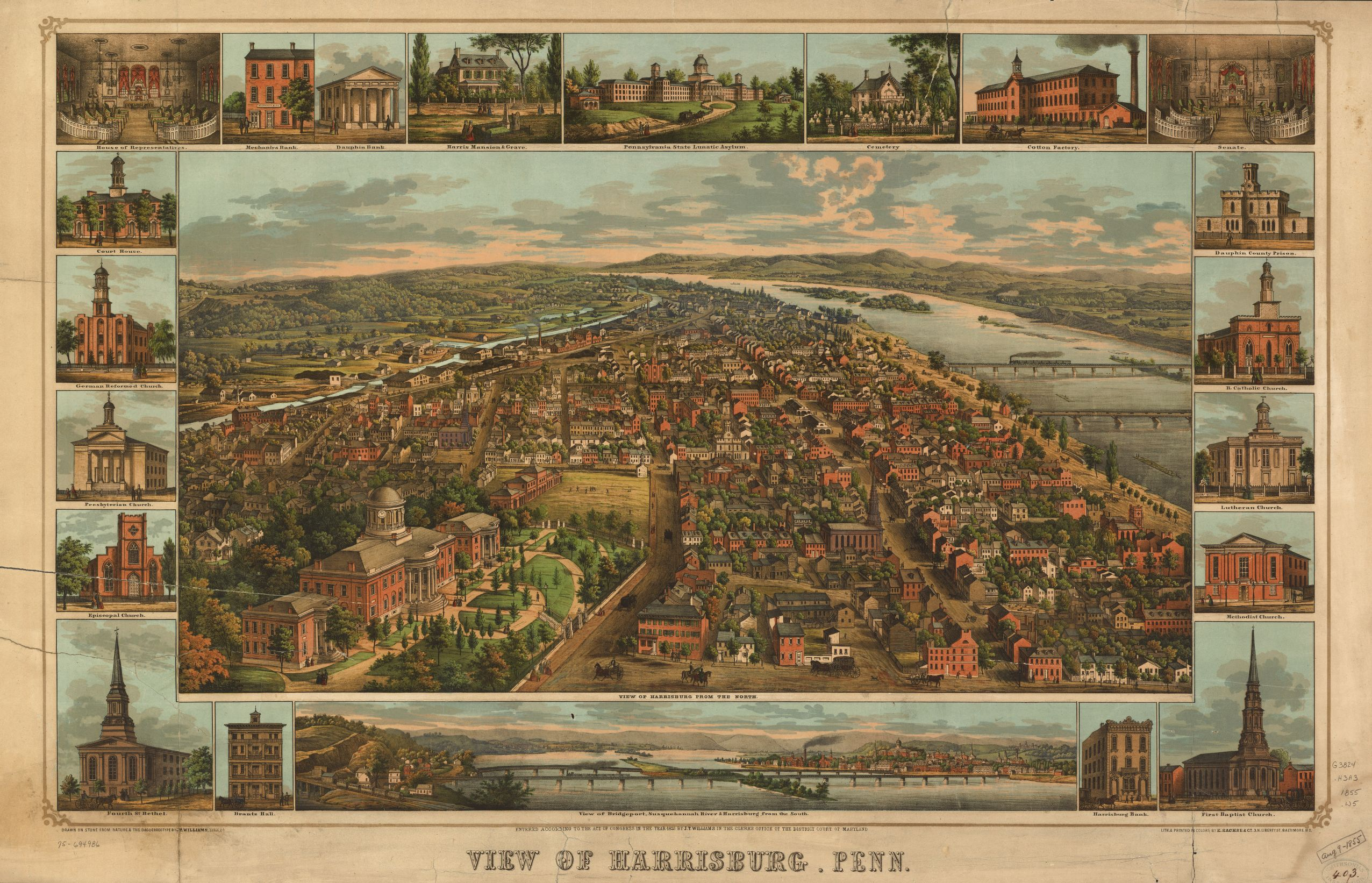
1855 map of Harrisburg

During the first part of the 19th century, Harrisburg was an important stopping place along the Underground Railroad, as escaped slaves would be transported across the Susquehanna River and were often fed and given supplies before they headed north towards Canada. The assembling of the Harrisburg Convention in 1827 led to the passage of the highly protective tariff bill of 1828. In 1839, the Harrison-Tyler ticket was nominated at Harrisburg. By the 1830s, Harrisburg had become part of the Pennsylvania canal system and an important railroad center as well, with Steel and iron the dominant industries. People from the rest of the nation were added to the original German settlers, along with immigrants from throughout the rest of the Old World, especially Scots-Irish, Welsh, French, and Huguenots. Because farming was still the predominant industry, Harrisburg did not develop in the arts, music, and science, unlike Philadelphia. In 1860, Harrisburg was chartered as a city.

Steel and other industries continued to play a major role in the local economy throughout the latter part of the 19th century. The city was the center of a large amount of railroad traffic and supported large furnaces, rolling mills, and machine shops. The Pennsylvania Steel Company plant, which opened in nearby Steelton in 1866, was the first in the country and was later operated by Bethlehem Steel. Harrisburg Car Manufacturing Company began as a railroad car manufacturer in 1853, and in 1935, the firm changed its name to Harrisburg Steel Company.

U.S. census reports show that, from 1820 to 1920, Harrisburg ranked within the nation's top 100 most populous urban areas.

=== Civil War ===
During the American Civil War, Harrisburg was a significant training center for the Union Army, with tens of thousands of troops passing through Camp Curtin. It was also a major rail center and a vital link between the Atlantic coast and the Midwest, with several railroads running through the city and over the Susquehanna River. As a result of that importance, it was a target of General Robert E. Lee's Army of Northern Virginia during its two invasions. The first time, the 1862 Maryland Campaign, Lee planned to capture the city after he had taken Harpers Ferry, West Virginia, but he was prevented from doing so by the Battle of Antietam and his subsequent retreat back into Virginia.

The second attempt was made during the Gettysburg campaign and was more substantial. Two full divisions of Richard S. Ewell's Second Corps approached Harrisburg in June 1863 from the southwest through Cumberland County, and a third division under Jubal Early planned to cross the Susquehanna River at Wrightsville, Pennsylvania, and to attack Harrisburg from the rear. In response, Union Major General Darius N. Couch, commanding the Department of the Susquehanna, dispatched troops to the present-day borough of Camp Hill, in the Cumberland Valley, approximately 2 miles (3.2 km) west of Harrisburg. Laborers hired by Couch quickly erected earthworks and fortifications along the western portion of Bridgeport, adjacent to Camp Hill. The two largest of them became known as "Fort Couch" and "Fort Washington".

On June 29, two Confederate cavalry companies attacked Union militia positions around Oyster Point but were driven back with two wounded. That allowed officers from Ewell's staff to get a view of Harrisburg's fortifications from what is now the Drexel Hills development of New Cumberland. Based on their information, Ewell prepared for an attack, but the same day, Lee ordered Ewell to pull back. Lee had recently discovered that the Union Army of the Potomac was closer than he had thought, and he desired to concentrate his forces near the South Mountain range to parry oncoming Union forces, a move that culminated in the Battle of Gettysburg. Ewell left two cavalry units behind at a place known as Sporting Hill, on the west side of Camp Hill. Brigadier General William F. Smith, commanding the 1st Division of the Department of the Susquehanna, sent two militia infantry regiments and a cavalry company to locate the Confederates. Both forces collided the next day and fought a short skirmish at Sporting Hill before the Confederates withdrew. The Skirmish of Sporting Hill is considered by many to be the northernmost battle of the Civil War.

== City Beautiful ==
In the late 19th century, Harrisburg was an undeveloped industrial urban center that suffered from a lack of clean water, poor drainage, frequent flooding, and the absence of recreational green space. When the Capitol burned down suddenly on February 2, 1897, congressional groups associated with western (Pittsburgh) and eastern (Philadelphia) factions seriously discussed the plausibility of transferring the capital city to a more suitable location. In December 1900, Mira Lloyd Dock, who had recently returned from an international trip to Europe, lectured about Harrisburg's potential to the city's Board of Trade. Arguing that Pennsylvania’s capital city should be clear and healthful, the Board created the Municipal League for Civic Improvement, which implemented an era of rapid transformation. The Municipal League found support in Vance McCormick, who was elected mayor of Harrisburg on an improvement campaign. The city expanded its city park system, which eventually included 1,100 acres; built steps and an esplanade along the Susquehanna River, which still exist today as Riverfront Park; paved seventy miles of roads; and improved the city water system. The city's population increased from 51,000 to 73,000 between 1900 and 1920.

A high point of Harrisburg's City Beautiful movement was the construction and dedication of a new and expensive Capitol building. Originally expected to cost $5 to $10 million, the cost had risen to $12.5 million when dedicated in 1906 ($4 million of which was for graft; $850 was spent for a $150 flagpole, for example). Five people, including the architect and chief contractor, received prison terms. The dedication of the Capitol was held on October 4 and attended by US President Theodore Roosevelt.

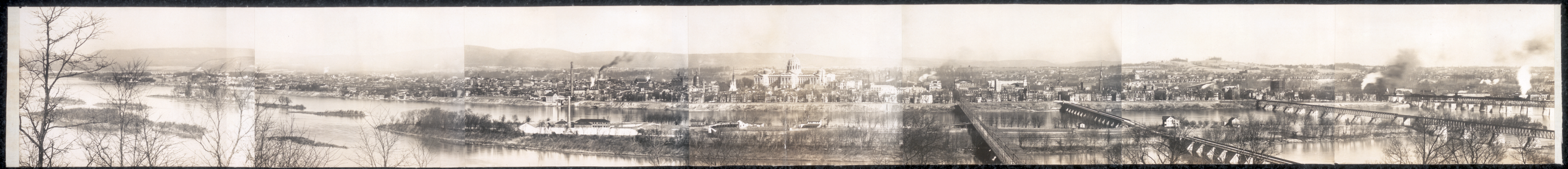
Harrisburg, as seen in 1906 from West Shore in stitched panorama, after the completion of the new Pennsylvania State Capitol and water filtration plant on City Island

Until about 1915, Dock and J. Horace McFarland continued to campaign for more funds to be put toward these improvements, and the citizen boards of Harrisburg continued to vote in favor of the project through 1914. The City Beautiful movement was viewed as a great success during its time, prompting many other cities to attempt to emulate it. However, the Old Eighth Ward was eliminated in order for many of these plans to be enacted, displacing one of the most diverse communities in Harrisburg.

== 20th century ==
The Pennsylvania Farm Show, a major annual agriculture exposition, was first held in 1917 and has been held every January since. The present location of the Show is the Pennsylvania Farm Show Complex & Expo Center, on the corner of Maclay and Cameron streets.

On February 14, 1964, the Harrisburg Area Community College (HACC) was founded as the first community college in Pennsylvania in the former Harrisburg Academy. In March 1965, the City of Harrisburg sold the college 157 acres (0.64 km^{2}) in Wildwood Park for a permanent campus. Construction of the academic buildings was completed in 1967. HACC now has additional campuses in Lebanon, Lancaster, Gettysburg, and York, besides the main campus in Harrisburg (now called the Wildwood Campus).

In June 1972, Harrisburg was hit by another flood from the remnants of Hurricane Agnes.

On March 28, 1979, the Three Mile Island nuclear plant, down the Susquehanna River from Harrisburg, suffered a partial meltdown. Although the meltdown was contained and little radiation was released, there were still worries that an evacuation would be necessary. Governor Richard Thornburgh recommended an evacuation of pregnant women and preschool children who lived within 5 5-mile (8 km) radius of the plant. Although only about 5,000 people were covered by this recommendation, 140,000 people fled the area.

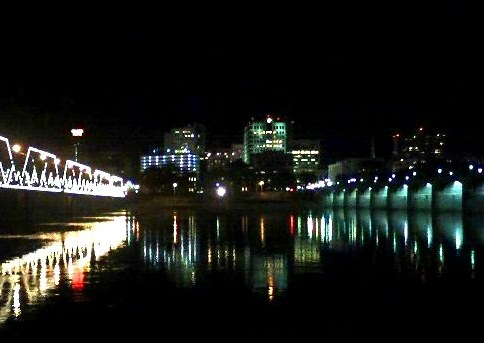
Downtown as it appears from City Island

After Harrisburg suffered years of being in bad shape economically, Stephen R. Reed was elected mayor in 1981 and served until his unexpected primary defeat in 2009 by Linda D. Thompson, which made him the longest-serving mayor of Harrisburg. Once elected, Reed immediately started projects which would attract both businesses and tourists. Several museums and hotels, such as the National Civil War Museum and the Hilton Harrisburg and Towers, were built during his term, along with office buildings and residences. Several semi-professional sports franchises, including the Harrisburg Senators of the Eastern League, the defunct Harrisburg Heat indoor soccer club, and the Harrisburg City Islanders of the USL Second Division, began operations in the city during his tenure as mayor.

However, Reed also spent public bond proceeds pursuing interests including collecting Civil War and Wild West memorabilia—some of which was found in Reed's home after his arrest on corruption charges. Infrastructure was left unrepaired, and the heart of the city's financial woes was a trash-to-electricity plant, the Harrisburg incinerator, which was supposed to generate income but instead, because of increased borrowing, incurred a debt of $320 million.

== 21st century ==
In October 2011, Harrisburg filed for Chapter 9 bankruptcy when four members of the seven-member City Council voted to file a bankruptcy petition to prevent the Commonwealth of Pennsylvania from taking over the city's finances. Bankruptcy Judge Mary France dismissed the petition because the City Council majority had filed it over the objection of Mayor Linda Thompson, reasoning that the filing not only required the mayor's approval but had circumvented state laws concerning financially distressed cities.

Instead, a state-appointed receiver took charge of the city's finances. Governor Tom Corbett appointed bond attorney David Unkovic as the city's receiver, but Unkovic resigned after only four months. Unkovic blamed disdain for legal restraints on contracts and debt for creating Harrisburg's intractable financial problem and said the corrupt influence of creditors and political cronies prevented fixing it.

As creditors began to file lawsuits to seize and sell off city assets, a new receiver, William B. Lynch, was appointed. The City Council opposed the new receiver's plans for tax increases and advocated a stay of the creditor lawsuits with a bankruptcy filing, while Mayor Thompson continued to oppose bankruptcy. State legislators crafted a moratorium to prevent Harrisburg from declaring bankruptcy, and after the moratorium expired, the law stripped the city government of the authority to file for bankruptcy and conferred it on the state receiver.

After two years of negotiations, in August 2013, Receiver Lynch revealed his comprehensive voluntary plan for resolving Harrisburg's fiscal problems. The complex plan called for creditors to write down or postpone some debt. To pay the remainder, Harrisburg sold the troubled incinerator, leased its parking garages for forty years, and was to briefly go further into debt by issuing new bonds. Receiver Lynch had also called for setting up nonprofit investment corporations to oversee infrastructure improvement (repairing the city's crumbling roads and water, and sewer lines), pensions, and economic development. These were intended to allow nonprofit fundraising and to reduce the likelihood of mismanagement by the then-dysfunctional city government.

Harrisburg's City Council and the state Commonwealth Court approved the plan, and it was implemented. The city balanced its budget in the late 2010s, was expected to have a surplus of $1 million in 2019, and maintained a surplus in 2020 despite the COVID-19 pandemic.
