= General DeWitt (disambiguation) =

John L. DeWitt (1880–1962) was a U.S. Army general. General DeWitt may also refer to:

- Calvin DeWitt Jr. (1894–1989), U.S. Army brigadier general
- Ralph B. DeWitt (1901–1974), U.S. Marine Corps brigadier general
