= William Maclay (Pennsylvania politician, born 1737) =

United States Senator from Pennsylvania (1737–1804)

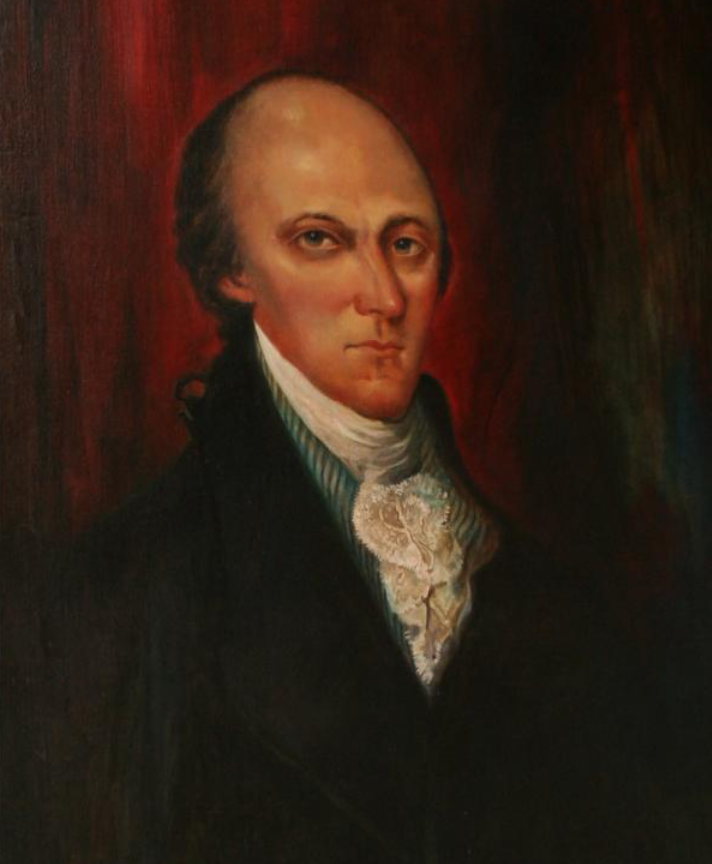

United States Senator from Pennsylvania
- In office March 4, 1789 – March 4, 1791
- Preceded by: Position established
- Succeeded by: Albert Gallatin

Member of the Pennsylvania House of Representatives
- In office 1795–1797

Personal details
- Born: July 20, 1737 New Garden Township, Chester County, Province of Pennsylvania, British America
- Died: April 16, 1804 (aged 66) Dauphin, Pennsylvania, U.S.
- Party: Anti-Administration Party
- Spouse(s): Mary McClure Maclay (née Harris, daughter of John Harris, Jr.)
- Occupation: Lawyer, surveyor, Pennsylvania Legislature, U.S. Senator

William Maclay (July 20, 1737 – April 16, 1804) was a politician from Pennsylvania during the eighteenth century. Maclay, along with Robert Morris, was a member of Pennsylvania's first two-member delegation to the United States Senate. He assisted John Harris Jr. with the planning the layout of Harrisburg, Pennsylvania in 1785, where Maclay Street is named for him. Following his tenure in the Senate, he served in the Pennsylvania House of Representatives on two occasions, as a county judge, and as a presidential elector. He is known for his journal providing historical information on the 1st United States Congress.

== Early life ==
Maclay was born in Chester County, Pennsylvania, his parents were Presbyterian immigrants of Scottish descent from Portadown, Ireland in what has since become Northern Ireland. Maclay pursued classical studies and then served as a militia lieutenant in the Battle of Fort Duquesne in 1758. He went on to serve in other expeditions in the French and Indian War.

== Career ==
He studied law and was admitted to the bar in 1760. After a period of practicing law, he became a surveyor in the employ of the Penn family, and then a prothonotary and clerk of the courts of Northumberland County in the 1770s. During the American Revolution, he served in the Continental Army as a commissary. He was also a frequent member of the Pennsylvania General Assembly in the 1780s. During that period, he was also the Indian commissioner, a judge of the court of common pleas, and a member of the executive council.

After the ratification of the Constitution Maclay was elected to the United States Senate and served in the 1st United States Congress from March 4, 1789, to March 4, 1791. He received a two-year term instead of the usual six-year term for senators after he lost a lottery with the other Pennsylvania senator, Robert Morris. In the Senate, Maclay was one of the most radical members of the Anti-Administration faction.

He constantly feuded with Vice President John Adams in the Senate after Adams rejected Maclay's political deal to support his vice-presidential candidacy during the 1789 presidential election. In July 1789 he issued a resolution requiring the president to request the Senate's permission to dismiss Cabinet members, but it was defeated by Vice President Adams's tiebreaking vote when Adams convinced Tristram Dalton and Richard Bassett to withdraw their support. During Senate debates over the Residence Act establishing the site of the U.S. permanent national capital and seat of government Vice President Adams worked with Morris, who preferred Philadelphia as the capital, to defeat Maclay's motion placing it near his landholdings on the Susquehanna River.

In his journal, which is the only diary and one of the most important records of the First United States Congress, he criticizes Vice President Adams and President George Washington. He also criticized many of their supporters who ran the Senate and included particular senators, believing that their ways of running the Senate were inefficient. He was unsuccessful in his attempt to be re-elected by the state legislature of Pennsylvania. His diary expresses his dry wit and commitment to democratic principles.

Following his retirement from national politics, he was also a member of the Pennsylvania State House of Representatives in 1795, 1796, and 1797. In addition, he was a presidential elector in the 1796 presidential election (voting for Jefferson), a county judge from 1801 to 1803, and a member again of the state House of Representatives in 1803. He died in 1804 and was interred in Old Paxton Church Cemetery in Harrisburg. Several of his relatives were also politicians, including his brother, Samuel Maclay, and his nephew, William Plunkett Maclay.

== Mansion and land ==
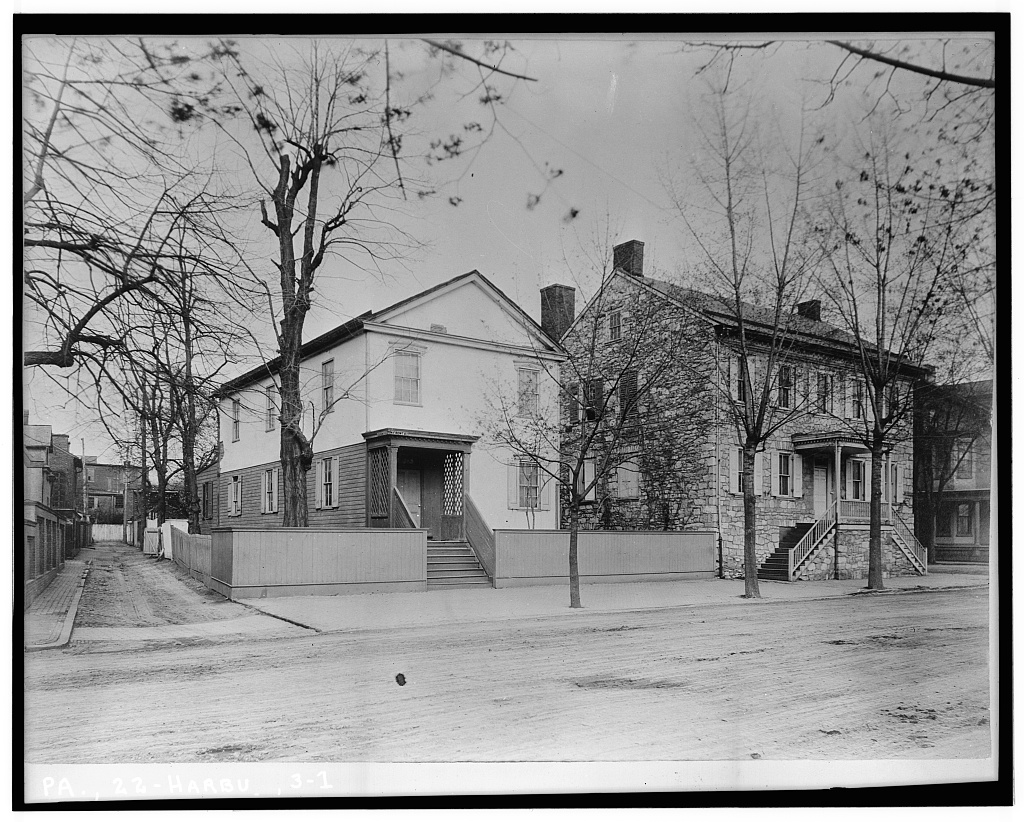
William Maclay Mansion (on right) as seen circa 1933

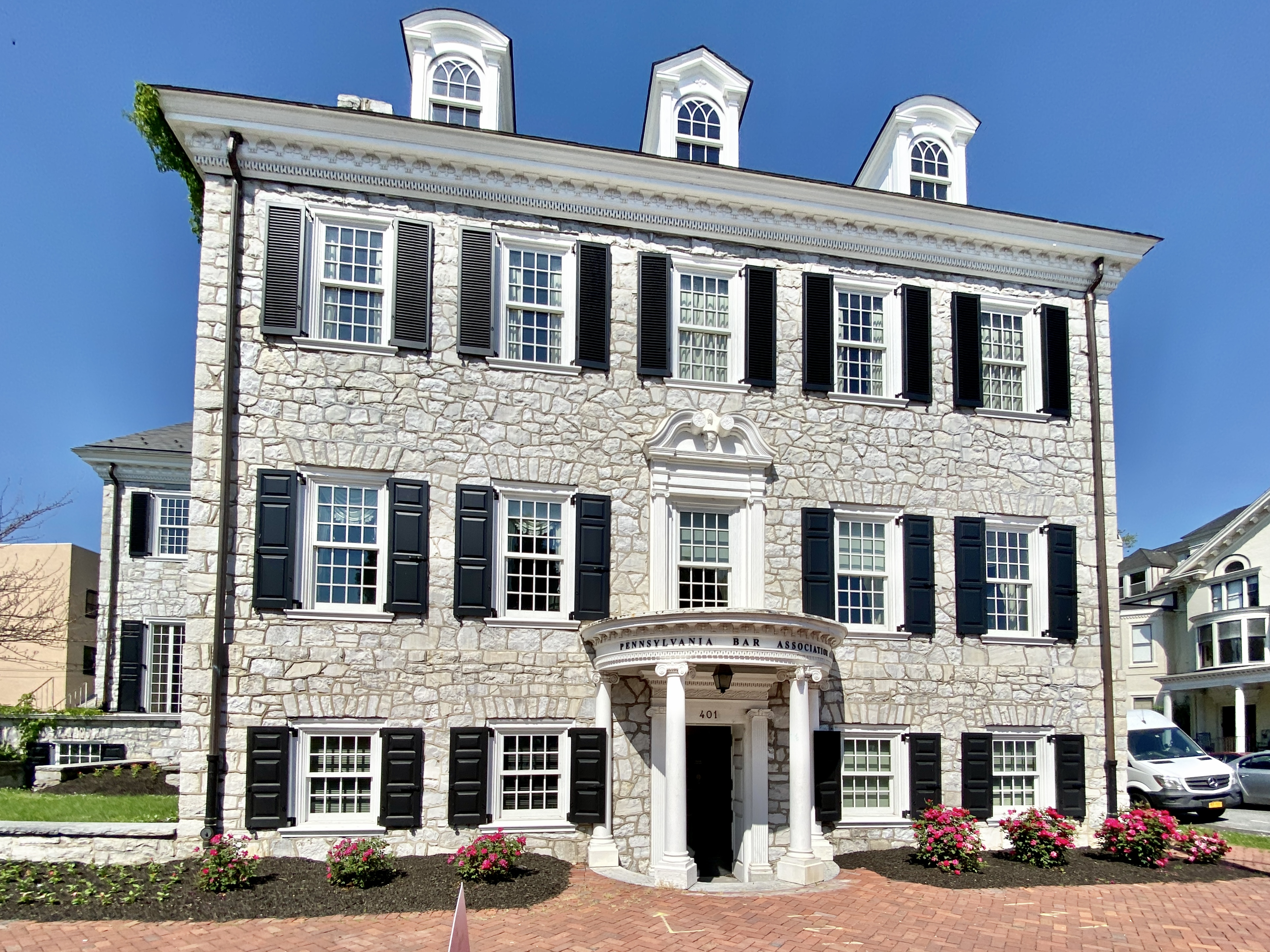
William Maclay Mansion as seen in 2022

Maclay retired to his farm in Dauphin, Pennsylvania in 1791, where he built a limestone mansion just north of the northern Harrisburg boundary at the time on Front Street and (ironically) South Street. In 1908, the home was purchased by William E. Bailey, a descendant of an early Harrisburg iron and steel industrialist family, who made renovations created by city architect Miller Kast to a Georgian Revival style. Presently, the building is occupied and maintained by the Pennsylvania Bar Association.

The area east of Maclay's Mansion came to be known as "Maclaysburg" (present day Downtown) and extended out to what would become the Pennsylvania State Capitol Complex. Because it was undeveloped and within the floodplain, it was also sometimes referred to as "Maclay's Swamp" between North and South streets and Second and Third Streets; in the winter, it was popular for ice skating. Previously trying to encourage the relocation of the capital to Harrisburg while in the U.S. Senate, Maclay sold ten acres of land to the Commonwealth prior to his death. In 1811, using that land, architect Stephen Hills began to construct the Capitol building and state office buildings after Governor Simon Snyder agreed to relocate centrally within Pennsylvania.

== Personal life and family ==
He married Mary McClure Harris (1750-1809), daughter of John Harris Jr. and granddaughter of John Harris Sr., who were both the namesakes of Harrisburg. William and Mary had several children, including Eleanor, who married William Wallace and had a daughter named Mary Elizabeth Wallace DeWitt. Her relatives are Brigadier General Wallace DeWitt, General John L. DeWitt, and Brigadier General Calvin DeWitt Jr.

U.S. Senate
Preceded by None	U.S. senator (Class 1) from Pennsylvania; 1789 – 1791; Served alongside: Robert Morris	Succeeded by Albert Gallatin
