= Calvin DeWitt Jr. =

American soldier

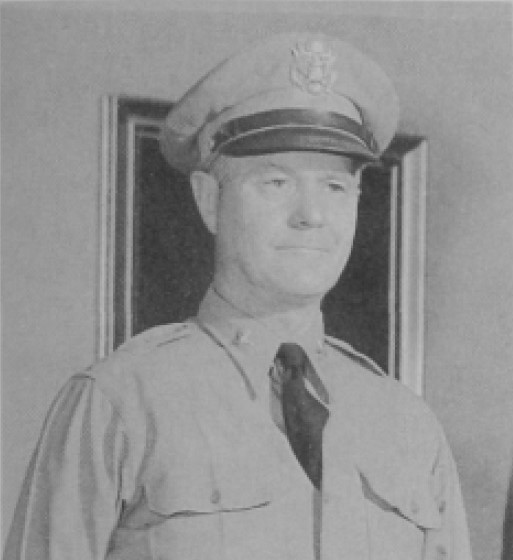
Brig. Gen. Calvin DeWitt Jr.

Calvin DeWitt Jr. (August 25, 1894 – January 10, 1989) was a brigadier general in the United States Army. He received the Army Distinguished Service Medal. During World War II, DeWitt commanded the Boston Port of Embarkation from 1943 to 1945. During the Korean War, he commanded the New York Port of Embarkation from 1952 to 1954. DeWitt's brother was John L. DeWitt.

== Early life and education ==
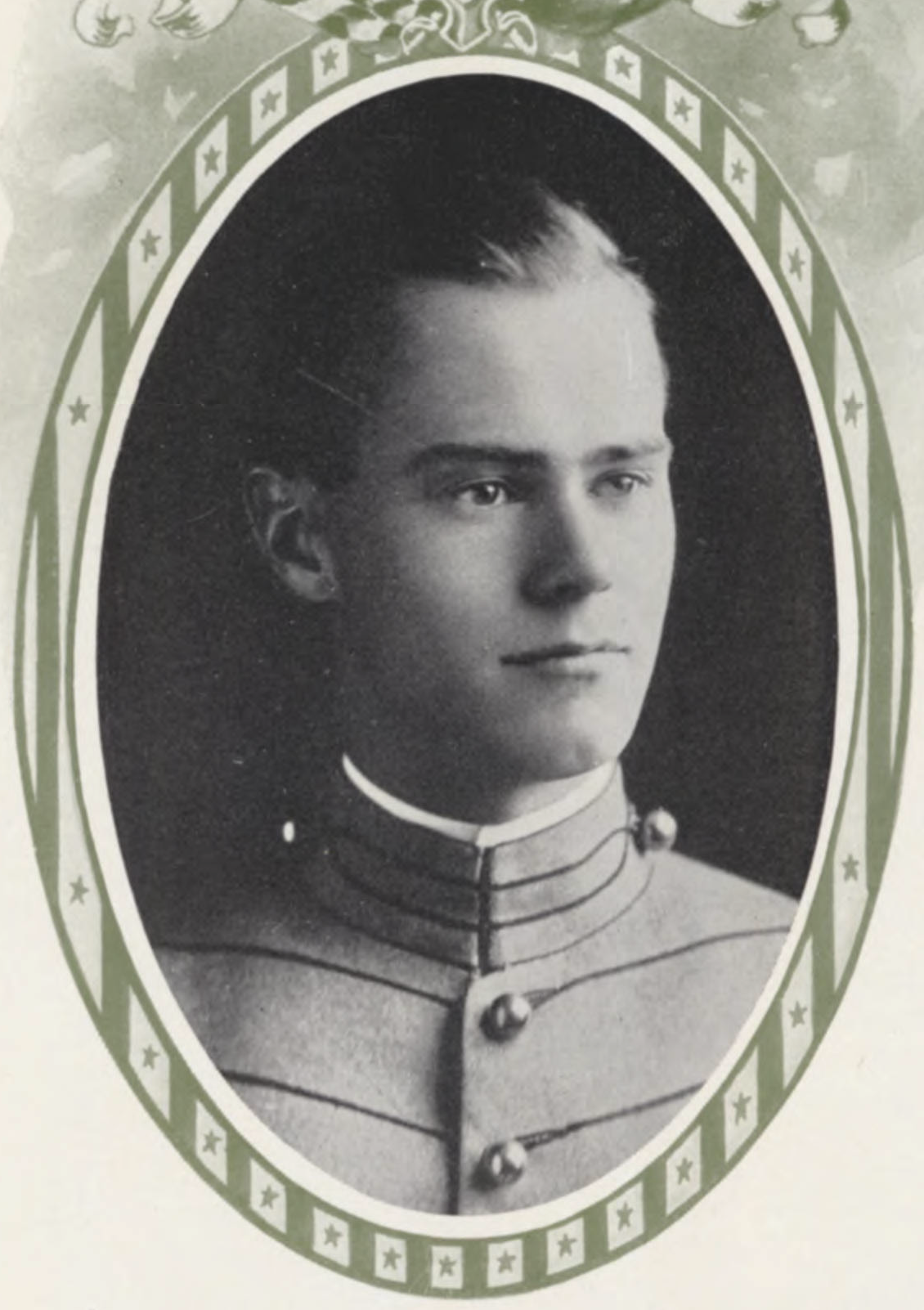
At West Point in 1916

DeWitt was born August 25, 1894, at Fort Leavenworth, Kansas, where his father, Brigadier General Calvin DeWitt Sr. (1840–1908), was stationed. His mother, Josephine Lesesne DeWitt (1856–1952), was a native of Charleston, South Carolina. DeWitt and his family moved around quite a bit due to his father's military career.

He appears in the 1900 United States Census living with his family at Fort Monroe, Virginia; the 1930 Census places him at Fort Riley, Kansas; the 1940 Census places him at El Paso, Texas.

DeWitt attended Western High School and the Columbian Preparatory School in Washington, D.C. before being appointed to the United States Military Academy. He graduated 58th in a class of 125 in June 1916 and was commissioned as a cavalry officer. DeWitt later graduated from the Command and General Staff School in June 1928, the Saumur Cavalry School in France in August 1931 and the U.S. Army War College in June 1938.

== Military career ==
During World War I, DeWitt served with the 3rd Cavalry Regiment in France. After the war, he was an instructor at the U.S. Military Academy from August 1922 to August 1926. DeWitt served as commanding officer of the 2nd Squadron, 13th Cavalry from July 1928 to September 1929 and of the 2nd Squadron, 5th Cavalry from August 1936 to July 1937.

From August 1938 to October 1940, DeWitt served with the 1st Cavalry Division at Fort Bliss. He was then assigned to the War Department General Staff in Washington, D.C. until December 1941.

During World War II, DeWitt was first assigned to the New York Port of Embarkation, eventually becoming chief of staff and deputy commander. Promoted to brigadier general in April 1943, he then became commanding general of the Boston Port of Embarkation. After the war, DeWitt served as commander of the bases at Nagoya and Kobe in Japan from November 1945 to February 1946 and deputy commander of the San Francisco Port of Embarkation from May 1946 to June 1947.

During the Berlin Airlift, DeWitt was in charge of ground transportation support. He officially transferred to the Transportation Corps in July 1950.

After serving as commanding general of the New York Port of Embarkation, DeWitt retired from military service in August 1954. In addition to the Distinguished Service Medal, he also received two awards of the Legion of Merit during his career.

== Later life ==
He died on January 10, 1989, at the Oak Meadow Nursing Home in Alexandria, Virginia. DeWitt was laid to rest in Arlington National Cemetery, where his wife, parents and all three siblings are also buried.

== Personal life and family ==
On February 14, 1925, in Manhattan, New York, DeWitt married Marjorie Anderson (1900–1979), daughter of Major William Hart Anderson, U.S. Army and his wife Elizabeth. Her grandfather, Charles Marley Anderson, was a United States Congressman from Ohio; her brother, William Hart Anderson Jr., was also a Major in the United States Army. They had three children together:

- Marjorie Robin DeWitt (b. 1930); married William Guy Macfarlane Robertson (1929–2008) on June 26, 1971, in Arlington, Virginia; one son, William D. Robertson
- Calvin DeWitt III (1932–2023); married Barbara Ann Fowler (b. 1938) on April 7, 1962, at Fort Monroe, Virginia. The two had three children: Calvin Craig DeWitt and two others. Their first grandchild, Calvin Wendell DeWitt, was born 1999. Henry was born later.
- William DeWitt (1939–2013); married Mary Lou Brady; two children, Tyler and Erica; was Professor at Williams College from 1977 until his death

His brothers were General John Lesesne DeWitt and Brigadier General Wallace DeWitt (1878–1949). His sister, Mary Wallace DeWitt (1884–1957), married Robert Moore Blanchard (1874–1959), who served as a colonel in the United States Army Medical Corps; their son, Brigadier General Robert Moore Blanchard Jr. (1909–1999), served during World War II and Korea, and was a 1933 graduate of the United States Military Academy at West Point, New York. Wallace's son, Wallace DeWitt Jr. (1908–1957), served as a major in the United States Army; and John's son, John Lesesne DeWitt Jr., served as a lieutenant colonel in the United States Army.

His paternal grandfather, Rev. William Radcliffe DeWitt (1792–1867), was a Presbyterian pastor in Harrisburg, Pennsylvania, from 1818 to 1867, and had served in the War of 1812 prior to this. His wife, DeWitt's paternal grandmother, was Mary Elizabeth (Wallace) DeWitt (1807–1881), granddaughter of United States Senator William Maclay, great-granddaughter of John Harris Jr. and great-great-granddaughter of John Harris Sr., both of whom Harrisburg, Pennsylvania is named for. His paternal uncle, Major William Radcliffe DeWitt Jr. (1827–1891) was a surgeon in the United States Army during the Civil War.

His paternal great-grandfather, John Radcliffe DeWitt (1752–1808), served as a Captain for the United States in the Revolutionary War, and as a New York State Representative from 1785 to 1788. It is through this DeWitt line that Calvin DeWitt Jr. is also a second cousin, three times removed of New York Governor DeWitt Clinton.

His first cousin, twice removed, William Radcliffe DeWitt V, served in the United States Marine Corps as a Private during the Korean War. His first cousin, three times removed, Robert George Schoenkopf III, served as a Sergeant in the United States Marine Corps during the Vietnam War.
