= John L. DeWitt =

United States Army general (1880–1962)

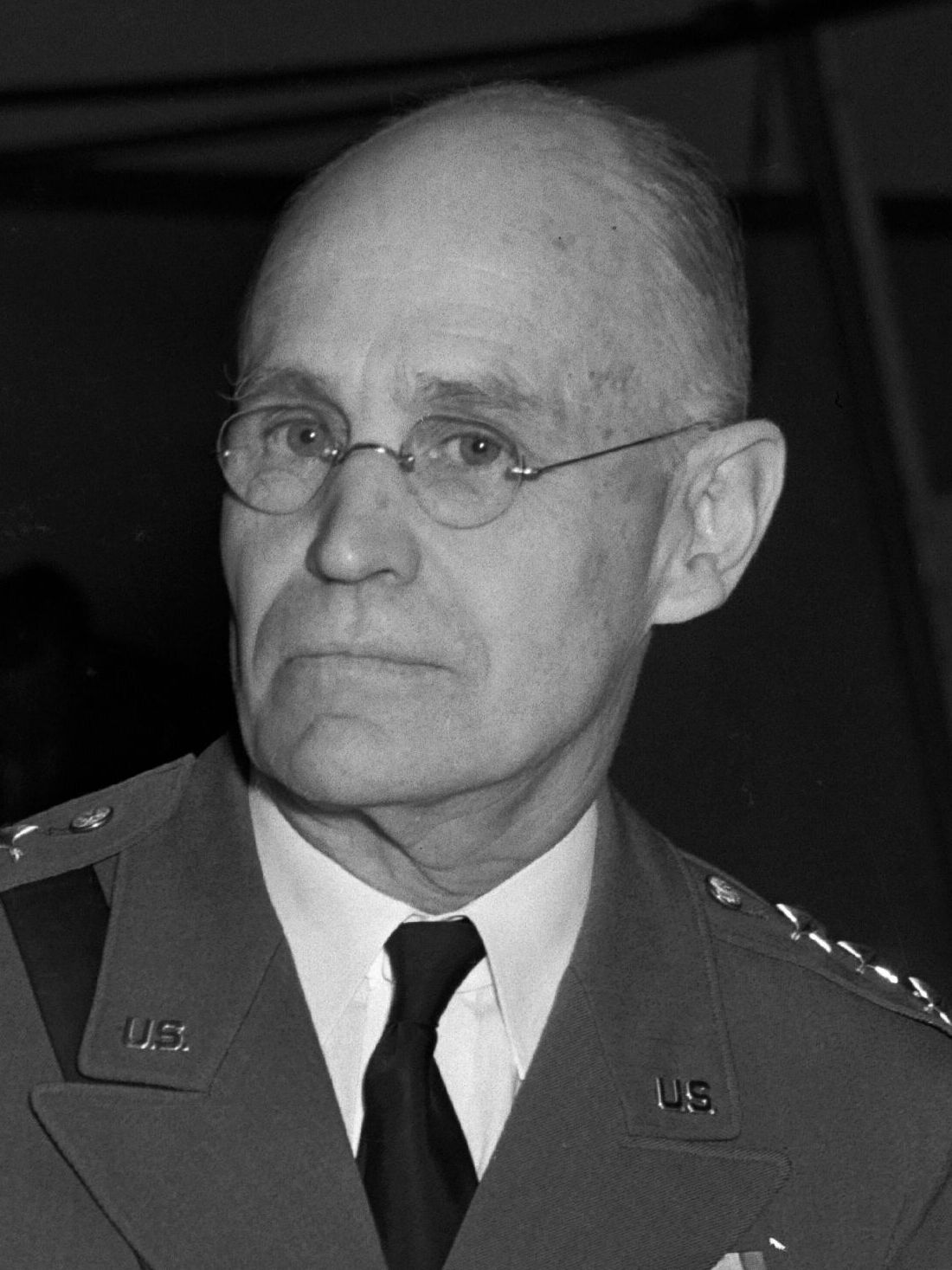
- DeWitt in 1940
- Born: 9 January 1880; Fort Sidney, Nebraska, United States
- Died: 20 June 1962 (aged 82); Washington, D.C., United States
- Burial place: Arlington National Cemetery
- Military career
- Allegiance: United States
- Branch: United States Army
- Service years: 1898–1947
- Rank: General
- Commands: Quartermaster General; Commandant, Army War College; Fourth United States Army; Western Defense Command; Army and Navy Staff College
- Known for: Internment of Japanese Americans
- Conflicts: Spanish–American War; Philippine–American War; World War I World War II
- Awards: Army Distinguished Service Medal (3); Navy Distinguished Service Medal

John Lesesne DeWitt (9 January 1880 – 20 June 1962) was a four-star general in the United States Army. He was best known for overseeing the internment of Japanese Americans during World War II.

After the attack on Pearl Harbor by the Japanese Empire on 7 December 1941, DeWitt believed that Japanese nationals and Japanese Americans in the West Coast of the United States were conspiring to sabotage the American war effort, and he recommended they be removed from coastal areas. President Franklin D. Roosevelt issued Executive Order 9066, giving authority to restrict military sensitive locations. DeWitt used the authority granted to him to issue military proclamations to place most of the West Coast off limits to Japanese Americans, incarcerating 110,000 Japanese men, women, and children in concentration camps, most of whom were American citizens.

== Early life ==
DeWitt was born at Fort Sidney, Nebraska, on 9 January 1880. His father, Brigadier General Calvin DeWitt (1840–1908), served with the United States Army and was an 1863 graduate of Princeton University. His mother, Josephine (Lesesne) DeWitt, was a native of Charleston, South Carolina, and he was named for his maternal grandfather, John F. Lesesne. He had an older brother, Wallace, a younger sister, Mary Wallace, and a younger brother, Calvin Jr. DeWitt was of Dutch descent.

== Military career ==
DeWitt enrolled at Princeton University in 1896, but left at the start of the Spanish–American War to enlist in the United States Army. On 10 October 1898, he was appointed as a second lieutenant of the infantry. DeWitt also served in the Philippine–American War, during which he witnessed the U.S. Army's use of concentration camps on Filipino civilians.

=== World War I ===
In 1918, DeWitt shipped out with the 42nd Division to the battlefields of France as a quartermaster in the division headquarters. Other noteworthy members of the division included Douglas MacArthur and William J. Donovan. In July 1918, DeWitt was promoted to full colonel, and continued quartermaster duties for the First Army. He received the Distinguished Service Medal at the end of World War I.

=== Interwar years ===
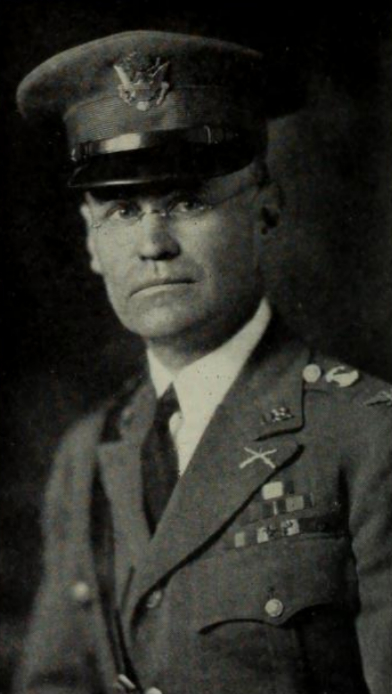
Colonel DeWitt c. 1930

After the war, DeWitt graduated from the Army War College in 1920. Between 1919 and 1930, he served in various quartermaster positions, including assistant commandant of the General Staff College, Chief of the Storage and Issue Branch, and the Supply Division. In 1930, DeWitt was promoted to major general and assigned as Quartermaster General of the U.S. Army. He also assumed control of the Gold Star Mothers' Pilgrimage to visit the graves of their sons who died in France during the First World War. General DeWitt was responsible for all logistics involving this Congressionally approved event. He was awarded an honorary A.M. degree by Princeton University in 1932.

After returning to the infantry, DeWitt assumed control of the Philippine Division. In July 1937, he became commandant of the Army War College. Two years later, in December 1939, he was promoted to the rank of lieutenant general, and then assumed command of the Fourth Army as well as the Western Defense Command of the United States Army, with responsibilities for the protection of the West Coast area of the United States from invasion by the Japanese.

=== World War II ===
At age 62, DeWitt would produce the "Final Report: Japanese Evacuation from the West Coast, 1942", which argued for the removal and internment of American-born citizens of ancestry tie to a past or present immigrant of Japan.

At the end of the internment of more than 100,000 Japanese-American citizens, not a single case of espionage was uncovered.

From 5 December 1939, to 15 June 1943, DeWitt was assigned command of the Ninth Corps Area and its 1942 successor, the Western Defense Command, both headquartered at the Presidio of San Francisco.

DeWitt was in San Francisco on the evening of 8 December 1941, one day after the Japanese attack on Pearl Harbor, when air raid sirens were sounded. An estimated 35 Japanese warplanes were supposedly sighted above San Francisco Bay on a reconnaissance mission. DeWitt was furious at the lack of blackout precautions during the air raids. He blasted city leaders at a Civil Defense Council meeting the next day, saying, "Death and destruction are likely to come to this city at any moment. … The people of San Francisco do not seem to appreciate that we are at war in every sense. I have come here because we want action and we want action now. Unless definite and stern action is taken to correct last night's deficiencies, a great deal of destruction will come. Those planes were over our community. They were over our community for a definite period. They were enemy planes. I mean Japanese planes. They were tracked out to sea."

At the Civil Defense Council meeting, DeWitt suggested that it might have been a good thing if the planes had dropped bombs to "awaken this city." He said, "If I can't knock these facts into your heads with words, I will have to turn you over to the police and let them knock them into you with clubs." DeWitt acknowledged that some people had asked why he failed to give orders to fire on the planes. "I say it's none of their damn business," he responded. "San Francisco woke up this morning without a single death from bombs. Isn't that enough?"

DeWitt recommended for the 1942 Rose Bowl football game, normally played in Pasadena, California, to be moved. DeWitt feared that the large crowd of spectators would be too tempting a target for Japanese warplanes. For the first and only time in its history, the 1942 Rose Bowl game was moved to North Carolina.

On 19 December 1941, General DeWitt had recommended to the Army's GHQ "that action be initiated at the earliest practicable date to collect all alien subjects fourteen years of age and over, of enemy nations and remove them to the Zone of the Interior." He initially felt very differently about the necessity and practicality of locking up citizens as well, in a telephone conversation with Major General Allen W. Gullion on 26 December. Regardless of this, following the Roberts Commission report of 25 January 1942 accusing persons of Japanese ancestry of widespread espionage in Hawaii prior to Pearl Harbor, along with his perception of public opinion as anti-Japanese, he became a proponent of internment of Japanese and initially German- and Italian-descended persons. He felt that the lack of sabotage efforts only meant that it was being readied for a large-scale effort. "The fact that nothing has happened so far is more or less . . . ominous, in that I feel that in view of the fact that we have had no sporadic attempts at sabotage that there is a control being exercised and when we have it it will be on a mass basis."

==== Internment of Japanese Americans ====
In February 1942, DeWitt reported to President Franklin D. Roosevelt that no sabotage by Japanese Americans had yet been confirmed, but he commented that it only proved "a disturbing and confirming indication that such action will be taken." He recommended the evacuation of all Japanese from the coastal areas of California, Oregon, Washington, and Alaska (then incorporated U.S. territory at the time). Using Executive Order 9066, DeWitt then began implementing a plan for classifying, rounding up, and removal of "undesirables."

On 2 March 1942, DeWitt issued "Military Proclamation No. 1," which designated the western parts of California, Oregon and Washington as "military area no. 1," further divided into "prohibited zone A-1" and "restricted zone B." In the first phase of the order, a provision was included directing that "any person of Japanese ancestry, now resident in Military Area No. 1, who changes his place of habitual residence must file a 'change of residence notice' at his local post office not more than five days nor less than one day prior to moving." Days later, DeWitt announced that the army had acquired 5,800 acres (23 km^{2}) of land near Manzanar, California, for construction of a "reception center" which he said was "to be used principally as a clearing house for the more permanent resettlement elsewhere for persons excluded from military areas." On 6 March, Executive Order 9066 was later extended to all Japanese persons and Americans of Japanese ancestry living in Alaska.

Removal began on 23 March 1942, with the resettlement of citizens living in Los Angeles. On that date, General DeWitt issued new orders applying to Japanese-Americans, setting an 8 p.m. to 6 a.m. curfew and banning ownership of firearms, radios, cameras, and other contraband. DeWitt stated, "Let me warn the affected aliens and Japanese-Americans that anything but strict compliance with this proclamation's provisions will bring immediate punishment." Northern California followed in April, as DeWitt declared, "We plan to increase the tempo of the evacuation as fast as possible." Citizens in specific areas were required to report to their designated "Civil Control Station," where they would then be taken to an Assembly Center for relocation.

All told, DeWitt ordered the removal and internment of 110,000 ethnic Japanese persons from their homes in the West Coast to internment camps inland. According to DeWitt, "a Jap is a Jap," whether a U.S. citizen or not.

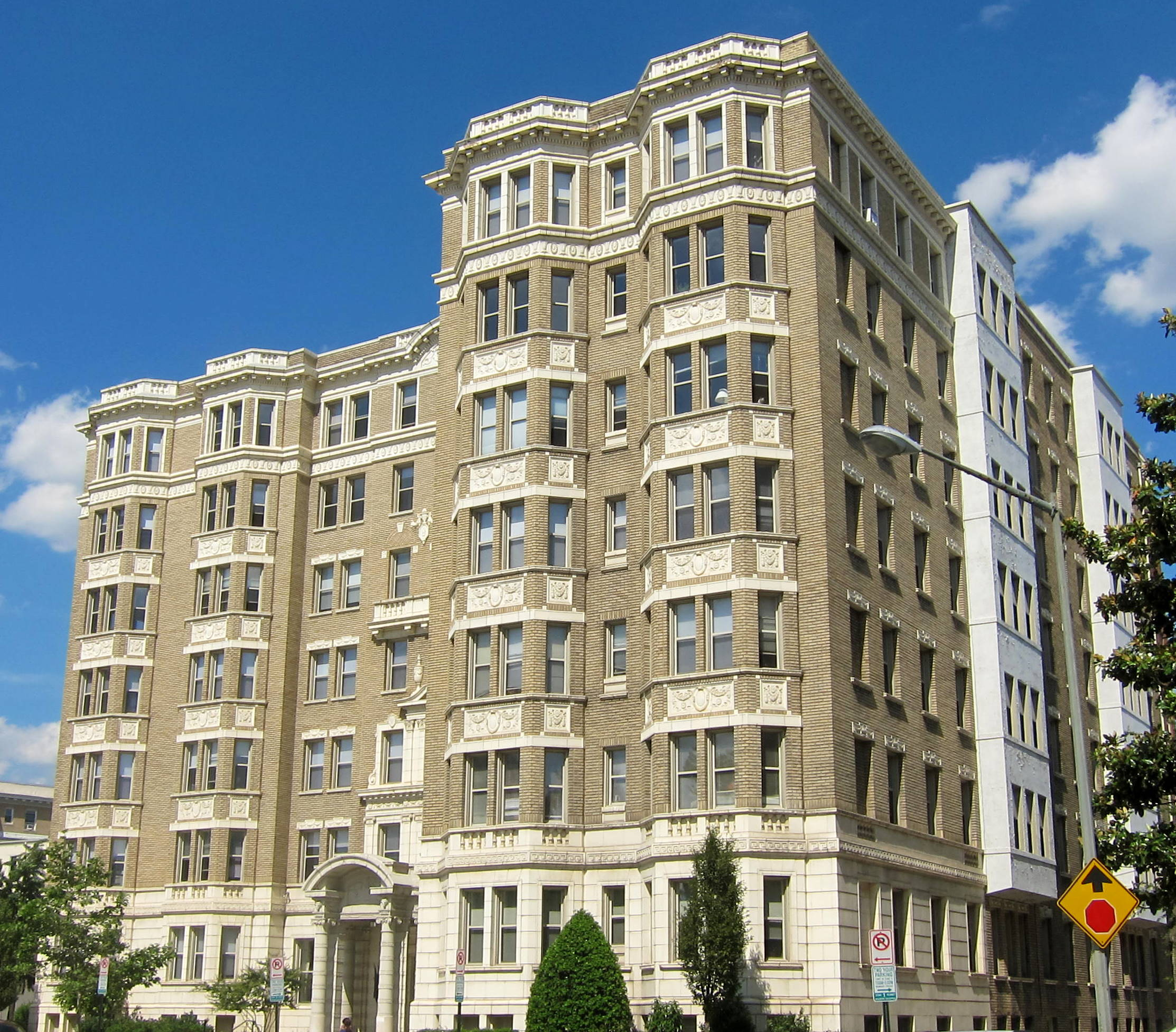
DeWitt's former residence in Adams Morgan, Washington, D.C.

A federal judge, James Alger Fee of Portland, Oregon, ruled in November, 1943 that American citizens could not be detained without a proclamation of martial law. DeWitt's response was "All military orders and proclamations of this headquarters remain in full force and effect."

After the relocation of Japanese Americans was complete, DeWitt lifted curfew restrictions on Italian-Americans on 19 October and on German-Americans on 24 December. Technically, the curfew was "inapplicable to the Japanese since all members of this group were removed from the affected zones." DeWitt had a personal vendetta against one Italian in particular, Remo Bosia, which is detailed in Bosia's autobiography, The General and I.

DeWitt was opposed to War Relocation Authority efforts to distinguish loyal from disloyal Japanese Americans/and to the creation of an all-Japanese combat unit. He testified before Congress, in 1943, that he would "use every proper means" at his disposal to stop the resettlement of Japanese Americans outside camp and their eventual return to the West Coast after the war. His and Colonel Karl Bendetsen's "Final Report" (circulated and then hastily redacted in 1943 and 1944) also laid out his position that their race made it impossible to determine their loyalty, thus necessitating internment. The original version was so offensive, even in the atmosphere of the wartime 1940s that Bendetsen ordered all copies to be destroyed.

In 1980, Aiko Herzig-Yoshinaga, interned at Manzanar concentration camp as a teenager, found a copy of the original Final Report in the National Archives, along with notes showing the numerous differences between the original and redacted versions. The earlier, racist and inflammatory version as well as the FBI and Office of Naval Intelligence (ONI) reports led to the coram nobis retrials, which overturned the convictions of Fred Korematsu, Gordon Hirabayashi and Minoru Yasui, on all charges related to their refusal to submit to exclusion and internment. The courts found that the government had intentionally withheld the reports and other critical evidence, at trials all the way up to the Supreme Court, which would have proved that there was no military necessity for the exclusion and internment of Japanese Americans. In the words of Department of Justice officials writing during the war, the justifications were based on "willful historical inaccuracies and intentional falsehoods."

==== Other actions ====
DeWitt's orders also regulated other areas of life on the West Coast. A proclamation prohibited deer hunting and the playing of outdoor sports at night. An Alaska Travel Office was established to issue permits to anyone seeking to travel into or out of the territory of Alaska.

Less known is DeWitt's role in supervising the combat operations in the Aleutian Islands, some of which had been invaded by Japanese forces. When houses of prostitution were closed across America, General DeWitt allowed Sally Stanford to continue to operate a high-class brothel in San Francisco. At the end of his tenure as head of Western Defense Command, he was appointed as the commandant of the Army and Navy Staff College in Washington. He retired from the army in June 1947.

=== Late career ===
In September 1943 DeWitt was reassigned as the commander of the Army-Navy Staff College (predecessor of the National War College) at Fort Lesley J. McNair in Washington, D.C. He held this position until he retired from the Army in 1946.

== Post-retirement ==
On 19 July 1954, DeWitt became a full general by special act of Congress for his services in World War II.

DeWitt died in Washington, D.C., on 20 June 1962, after suffering a heart attack at his home in the Glover Park neighborhood. He is buried in Section 2 of Arlington National Cemetery along with his wife Martha. Buried in an adjacent gravesite are his son, John Lesesne DeWitt Jr. (1904–1982), who retired as a lieutenant colonel in the United States Army; and John's wife, Annie Sue DeWitt (1907–1996).

== Personal life and family ==
On 3 June 1903, in Birmingham, Alabama, DeWitt married Martha Estes (1883–1968), daughter of George Henson and Anna Georgia (Thornton) Estes. She was the sister of United States Army officer George Henson Estes Jr. Together, they had one son:

- John Lesesne DeWitt Jr. (1904–1982); John was twice married: first to Margaret Loretta Dorsett on 8 June 1933 (div. 1946, three children) and second to Annie Sue Waldrop on 4 June 1947 (one child)
  - Margaret Loretta DeWitt (b. 1936); married first William Clark Young (1927–1988) on 15 July 1958; married second Norbert Arnold Jones on 10 October 1992
    - Lauren D. Young (b. 1960); married Robert Scott Jamieson (b. 1953)
      - Andrew Scott Jamieson (b. 1985)
    - Joyce E. Young (b. 1961)
  - John Lesesne DeWitt III (b. 1937); married Dianne Marie Jennings; served as a major in the United States Army during the Vietnam War
  - Thornton Brooke DeWitt (1939–1991)
  - Martha Lou DeWitt (b. 1948)

His paternal grandparents were Rev. William Radcliffe DeWitt (1792–1867) and Mary Elizabeth (Wallace) DeWitt (1807–1881). William was a Presbyterian pastor in Harrisburg, Pennsylvania and had served with the United States in the War of 1812 prior to that. Mary was the granddaughter of Congressman William Maclay, great-granddaughter of John Harris Jr., and great-great-granddaughter of John Harris Sr., both of whom Harrisburg is named for.

His paternal great-grandfather, John Radcliffe DeWitt (1752–1808), was a captain in the American Revolutionary War and served as a New York State Assemblyman from 1785 to 1788. His paternal great-great-grandfather, Peter DeWitt (1722–1790), was a private in the American Revolutionary War. Through these men John L. DeWitt is a second cousin, three times removed, of former New York Governor DeWitt Clinton. Another second cousin, three times removed was Simeon DeWitt.

His first cousin, twice removed, William Radcliffe DeWitt V, served in the United States Marine Corps as a private during the Korean War. His first cousin, three times removed, Robert George Schoenkopf III, served as a sergeant in the Marine Corps during the Vietnam War.

== Awards ==
- Army Distinguished Service Medal with two oak leaf clusters
- Navy Distinguished Service Medal
- Philippine Campaign Medal
- Mexican Service Medal
- Victory Medal with seven campaign clasps
- American Defense Service Medal with star
- American Campaign Medal
- Asiatic-Pacific Campaign Medal with one campaign star
- World War II Victory Medal
- Order of the Aztec Eagle (Mexico)

== Dates of rank ==
No insignia in 1898	Second lieutenant, Regular Army: 10 October 1898
	First lieutenant, Regular Army: 29 January 1900
	Captain, Regular Army: 25 May 1906
	Major, Regular Army: 15 May 1917
	Lieutenant colonel, National Army: 5 August 1917
	Colonel, Regular Army: 30 July 1918
	Major, Regular Army: 1 August 1919
	Lieutenant colonel, Regular Army: 1 July 1920
	Colonel, Regular Army: 9 May 1921
	Major general, Temporary: 18 January 1930
	Colonel, Regular Army: 2 February 1934
	Brigadier general, Regular Army: 26 March 1934
	Major general, Regular Army: 1 December 1936
	Lieutenant general, Temporary: 5 December 1939
	Lieutenant general, Retired List: 31 January 1944
	Lieutenant general, Active Duty: 1 February 1944
	Lieutenant general, Retired List: 10 June 1947
	General, Retired List: 19 July 1954

Military offices
Preceded by Walter S. Grant	Commandant of the United States Army War College; 1937–1939	Succeeded by Philip B. Peyton
