= Journal of William Maclay =

Book by William Maclay

- Title page for Journal of William Maclay (1890 unabridged edition)
- Author: William Maclay
- Language: English
- Genre: Non-fiction/journal
- Publication date: 1880 (abridged); 1890 (unabridged)

The Journal of William Maclay is a published version of a diary kept by William Maclay during his tenure as a United States Senator representing Pennsylvania, a position in which he served from 1789 to 1791. Maclay began keeping the diary within two months of taking office and kept it almost daily during the 1st United States Congress. It is one of few accounts of the early United States Senate; sessions would not become open to the public until 1795.

== Composition and publication ==
William Maclay, shortly after being elected by the Pennsylvania Legislature to the U.S. Senate, began to keep a diary of daily Senate proceedings for personal reference; it was not uncommon at the time for Senators to keep personal records of floor proceedings. In the diary, which he kept in the evenings, Maclay opined about his colleagues and commented on various issues of pertinence during the period. It is speculated by some Senate historians that the original incitation for the diary's creation was his somewhat uneasy relationship with the first Vice-President of the United States and President of the Senate John Adams; the two differed sharply on many political issues.

A nephew of Maclay, George Washington Harris, is responsible for the diary's initial publication after discovering three volumes after Maclay's death. For the next two decades, Harris unsuccessfully sought congressional support for publication of the diary, convinced it should be printed at public expense. Harris later published the diaries, with parts omitted, albeit on his own.

An unabridged edition of the diary edited by Edgar Maclay, a distant cousin of the author, was eventually published in 1890 by D. Appleton & Company. Edgar Maclay, in the preface to the edition, criticized the previous, abridged edition. He believed the earlier version, because of its "expurgated" nature, was of diminished value. The diary is also included in The Diary of William Maclay and Other Notes on Senate Debates, published in 1988 as part of the Documentary History of the First Federal Congress by the Johns Hopkins University Press.

To ensure the diary's contents would be available in the Library of Congress, the United States Congress ultimately purchased the original manuscript from Maclay's descendants in 1941 for US$750 (equivalent to $16,417 in 2025).
