= Remo Bosia =

American soldier and writer

- Private Remo Bosia
- Born: November 6, 1905 Madera, California; United States
- Died: August 19, 1990 (aged 84) San Carlos, California; United States
- Occupation: Journalist; Pilot; Jeweler; Writer
- Spouse: Marcella Bosia
- Children: Sandra Bugna-Erle
- Relatives: Rosann-McWherter, Elana Davidson, Danee Mitchell & Tony Bugna (grandchildren)

Remo Bosia (1905-1990) was an American soldier and writer of the memoir The General and I (New York: Phaedra, 1971) . He spent the years of World War II in court-martial proceedings after attempting to enlist in the United States Army. His book talks about how he felt personally singled out by General John L. DeWitt.

An American of Italian descent, Bosia was born in Madera, California, and moved to Europe at age six with his parents. As a young man, he returned to the United States, where he worked as a stunt pilot and then as a writer and translator for San Francisco's Italian-American newspaper, L'Italia. After his World War II travails, described in his book The General and I, Bosia opened a jewelry store, which he ran until his retirement, at which time he began operating a motel. The multi-talented Bosia also composed several songs and painted landscapes, which were exhibited locally.

== Sources ==
- US Library of Congress catalog
- Unknown Internment by Stephen Fox (author/educator)
