= Edgar Stanton Maclay =

American journalist & historian (1863–1919)

- Born: 18 April 1863; Fuzhou, China
- Died: 2 November 1919 (aged 56); Washington, D.C., United States
- Education: Syracuse University
- Occupations: journalist and historian
- Known for: reporter, Brooklyn Times, New York Tribune, New York Sun
- Notable work: History of the United States Navy

Edgar Stanton Maclay (18 April 1863 – 2 November 1919) was an American journalist and historian.

== Biography ==
Maclay was born 18 April 1863 in Fuzhou, China. Until her death in 1879, his mother tutored him in preparation for college. Beginning in 1881, after a year of further preparatory study at Syracuse, New York, he entered the classics program at Syracuse University, graduating in 1885. He then researched American history for over a year in England, France and Germany.

He was a reporter on the Brooklyn Times (1886–1890) and on the New York Tribune (1891–1893); he served on the editorial staff of the Tribune (1893–1895) and on that of the New York Sun (1895–1896).

In 1896 he was appointed lighthouse keeper at Old Field Point, and in 1901 received an appointment at the New York Navy Yard. He edited the Journal of William Maclay and was the author of History of the United States Navy, which occasioned much controversy and brought about his dismissal from government employ, by order of President Roosevelt, in 1901. The ground of this action, following Maclay's refusal of an official request for his resignation, was a passage in the History stigmatizing Rear Admiral Winfield Scott Schley as a “caitiff, poltroon and coward” for his conduct in the naval fight off Santiago, Cuba on 3 July 1898. Maclay also wrote Reminiscences of the Old Navy and The History of American Privateers.

Maclay died on 2 November 1919, in Washington, D.C.
