= Mira Lloyd Dock and the Progressive Era Conservation Movement =

2012 biography by Susan Rimby

- Author: Susan Rimby
- Published: 2012
- Publisher: Penn State University Press
- Pages: 208
- ISBN: 978-0-271-05823-8
- OCLC: 841810164

Mira Lloyd Dock and the Progressive Era Conservation Movement is a biography of a Pennsylvania environmentalist and conservationist, written by Susan Rimby.

== Overview ==
Historian Susan Rimby, who holds a Ph.D. in United States history from the University of Pittsburgh, began researching the book in 2001 while serving as Scholar-in-Residency at the Pennsylvania State Archives. Shippensburg University of Pennsylvania's Center for Faculty Excellence in Scholarship and Teaching assisted her research travels for this book with two grants. Rimby is currently a Founding Dean of the College of Liberal Arts and Education at Lock Haven University of Pennsylvania.

Mira Lloyd Dock (1853–1945) was at the forefront of the Progressive Era environmental and conservation movement, and in 1901 became the first woman to serve on the Pennsylvania Forest Commission or any public forest commission. Rimby begins by stating her case on why Dock's story is relevant, framed against the background of late 19th century and early 20th century emergence of civic activism in the fields of conservation and ecology. As Dock began to receive public and institutional support for her horticulture lectures, she was elected to represent Pennsylvania at the International Congress of Women to be held that summer in London. The author weaves Dock's accomplishments around her eagerness to constantly ingest more knowledge, such as her month-long tour of Germany's forests made possible by botanist Dietrich Brandis. Rimby follows Dock's decades-long career toward the conclusion of Dock's legacies that remain today.

== Reception ==
Kevin C. Armitage of Miami University of Ohio, in reviewing the book for the Ohio Valley History journal, noted that Rimby meticulously provided an historical framework for Dock's life that made the connection between women's suffrage, civic activism and environmental conservation. He stated that the book should inspire more scholarly output on gender's role in environmental activism.

The H-Net review by Jessica DeWitt noted that the book was light-weight on documenting the conservation movement. But otherwise, DeWitt wrote that the book's strengths were in presenting Dock's story well-framed within the historical, environmental and social times in which she lived.

Goodreads gave the book four stars out of five, and said the book created a "a vivid and accessible picture of Progressive Era conservation in the eastern United States and Dock's important role and legacy in that movement."

== Detailed release information ==
- Rimby, Susan (2012). Mira Lloyd Dock and the Progressive Era Conservation Movement. Penn State University Press. ISBN 978-0-271-05823-8 – via Project MUSE.
