= Mira Lloyd Dock =

American botanist (1853–1945)

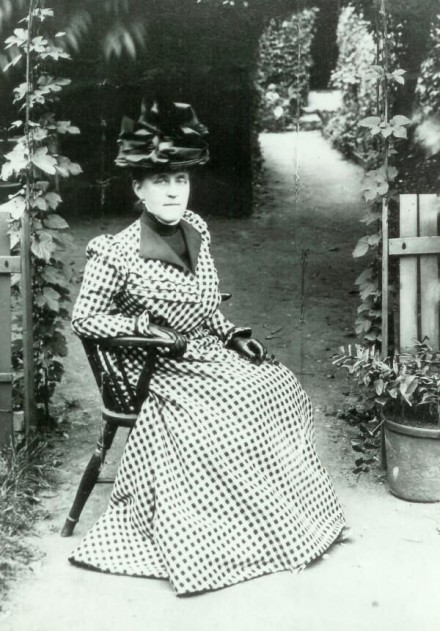
- Born: December 25, 1853; Harrisburg, Pennsylvania, U.S.
- Died: July 11, 1945 (aged 91); Cashtown, Pennsylvania, U.S.
- Education: University of Michigan
- Occupation: Botanist

Mira Lloyd Dock (December 25, 1853 − July 11, 1945) was an American botanist, environmentalist, and educator.

== Biography ==
She was born in Harrisburg, Pennsylvania, the first child of coal businessman Gilliard Dock and his wife Lavinia Lloyd Bombaugh. The couple would have five more children: four daughters and one son, including Lavinia Lloyd Dock, born February 26, 1858. Lloyd Dock was home-schooled by her parents and a governess before attending private schools in Harrisburg and Lancaster, Pennsylvania. She attended Brooke Hall Seminary in Pennsylvania, completing her studies when she was in her 20s.

When her mother died in 1876, Lloyd Dock returned home to care for her father and siblings, a task that would occupy her for the next 20 years. Her younger sister, Lavinia, went on to a renowned career in nursing, being a founder of modern professional nursing education, an author of several nursing guides, and an editor of the American Journal of Nursing. It was only after her father died in 1895 that Lloyd Dock matriculated to the University of Michigan to study botany, chemistry, and geology.

After graduating in 1896, Lloyd Dock became interested in the city's landscape and recreational parks, as well as the health of Harrisburg's residents. She formed the Civic Club of Harrisburg, becoming president of its Department of Forestry and Town Improvement. In 1899, Lloyd Dock was selected by both the State Federation of Pennsylvania Women and the Parks Association of Pennsylvania to be their representative in the International Congress of Women, that year held in London, England. On December 20, 1900, Lloyd Dock gave a speech to the Harrisburg Board of Trade titled "The City Beautiful," or "Improvement Work at Home and Abroad." This would launch a process of city beautification in Harrisburg, PA, with Lloyd Dock working in partnership with J. Horace McFarland, President of the American Civic Association.

In 1901, Pennsylvania governor William A. Stone appointed Lloyd Dock to the Pennsylvania Forestry Reservation Commission, the first woman to serve in that position. She spent time touring the state, looking for deforested and abandoned areas across the state, which she recommended for purchase by the government. Over 175,000 acres were purchased during her first year in office. She began lecturing at the State Forestry Academy in 1903, having lobbied for the formation of the school, and would continue to teach there until 1929. After serving for three successive terms, she declined a reappointment to the Forestry Reservation Commission when her final term expired on July 25, 1913. By that time the state had purchased over a million acres of forest reserves.

There is a historical marker for Lloyd Dock located in Harrisburg across the street from where she lived.

== See also ==
- Mira Lloyd Dock and the Progressive Era Conservation Movement
