= John Harris Sr. =

English-American businessman and settler of Harrisburg, PA

- Born: 1673; Yorkshire, England
- Died: December 1748 (aged 74–75); Province of Pennsylvania
- Known for: Namesake of Harrisburg, Pennsylvania
- Children: 9, including John Harris Jr.

John Harris Sr. (1673 – December 1748) was an early American businessman who emigrated from Britain to the Thirteen Colonies late in the 17th century. Harris would later settle along the Susquehanna River and establish a ferry there. This ferry would eventually develop into Harrisburg, Pennsylvania, which was named in his honor.

== Biography ==
Harris was born in Yorkshire, England, the son of Welsh parents. He worked in the City of London as a brewer until middle-age.

When Harris landed in Philadelphia, his total wealth was sixteen guineas (about four ounces of gold). He began to improve his fortune through contracts to clear land and open streets in the city. He formed a firm and lifelong friendship with Edward Shippen, the second Mayor of Philadelphia, justice of the State Supreme Court and later president of the Provincial Council. Harris would go on to marry Shippen's niece Esther Sey (Say), also a native of Yorkshire, England. He developed cordial relations with the family of William Penn as well.

In 1705, the first John Harris received his trader's license to "seat himself on the Sasquahannah" (Susquehanna River) and "to erect such buildings as are necessary for his trade, and to enclose and improve such quantities of land he shall see fit." At first a roving trader, he eventually established a trading post along the river. Soon after, he became known for his fair dealings with the local Indians and later, wise counsel to the settlers, reputations which became traditional with him and his sons.

In 1733, he was granted the right to operate a ferry across the Susquehanna and for more than half a century "Harris's Ferry" was the funnel through which much of the Scottish, Irish and German migration trickled west. In the same year Harris acquired, through grants, two tracts of land adjacent to his ferry, totaling 800 acres (3.2 km^{2}). Today, the area has been developed into downtown Harrisburg. John Harris Sr. had seven sons and two daughters.

== Death ==
Harris died in December 1748 and left the management of the estate and control of an important strong point on the frontier to his son John Harris Jr.

== See also ==
- History of Harrisburg, Pennsylvania
