= John Harris Jr. (settler) =

American frontiersman and ferry operator (1727–1791)

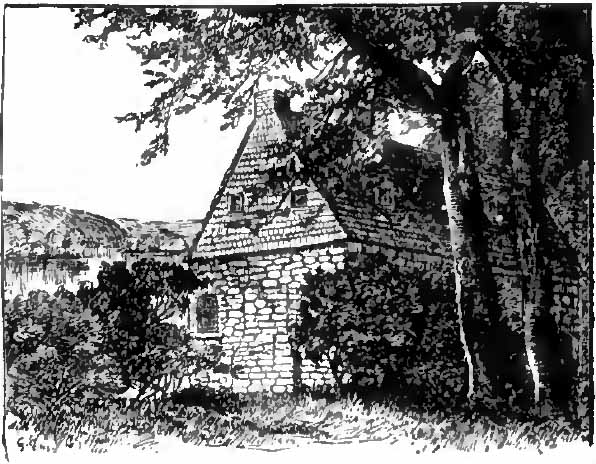
- John Harris' House
- Born: October 22, 1727; Harrisburg, Pennsylvania
- Died: July 29, 1791 (aged 63)
- Known for: founding Harrisburg, Pennsylvania
- Spouses: Elizabeth McClure (m. 1749 - 1764); Mary Reed (m. 1764 - 1787)
- Father: John Harris Sr.

John Harris Jr. (October 22, 1727 – July 29, 1791) (Note: Accounts differ on Harris Jr.'s exact birthdate (such as his headstone displaying the year "1726") but the most recent publications by historians use this date.), was an American frontiersman and politician who operated a ferry along the Susquehanna River at Harrisburg, Pennsylvania and was later instrumental in the founding and growth of the city and support of the State through wartime. Harris was the son of John Harris Sr., who is considered the first settler to establish a trading post along the Susquehanna River at what would later become the state capital of Pennsylvania. Harris Jr. served in the Pennsylvania Assembly from 1776 to 1782.

== Biography ==
John Harris Jr. was born in Harrisburg in 1727, then was baptized at Christ Church, Philadelphia at 11 months old and he was figured to have received a formal education in Philadelphia. He then grew up on the frontier in Harrisburg and by August 1748 reached the rank of captain in the Provincial Army created by the Pennsylvania Provincial Council. Following his father's death in December 1748, Harris Jr. continued to operate his father's trading business and ferry operation. For many years, Harris Jr. and his family were considered the principal store keepers on the American frontier. At his house two notable "council fires" were held with the Indians of the Six Nations and other tribes. At the first, June 8, 1756, Governor Morris, with his council, was present; and at the second, April 1, 1757, the deputy of Sir William Johnson, his majesty's deputy of the affairs of the Six Nations, met the representatives of the Indian Nations and many of their warriors. John Harris Jr. built and maintained the confidence of the Native Americans. At a conference of Governor Hamilton with them, August 23, 1762, they asked that "the present store-keepers may be removed and honest men placed in their stead," and selected John Harris Jr. Said the chief, who addressed the governor, "I think John Harris is the most suitable man to keep store, for he lives right in the road where our warriors pass, and he is very well known by us all in our Nation, as his father was before him."

Harris's house, built in 1766, along what is now Front Street in downtown Harrisburg, still stands today. It is known as the John Harris-Simon Cameron Mansion, renamed after Harris Jr. and later occupant Simon Cameron, Lincoln's first Secretary of War and Minister to Russia, and is a historic house museum. It is a National Historic Landmark.

== See also ==
- History of Harrisburg, Pennsylvania
