= A Gathering at the Crossroads =

Monument on Pennsylvania State Capitol Grounds

- Interactive map of A Gathering at the Crossroads
- Location: North 4th & Walnut Streets, Harrisburg, Pennsylvania
- Coordinates: 40.263149°N 76.881172°W
- Designer: Becky Ault
- Type: Sculpture
- Opening date: 2020

A Gathering at the Crossroads is an African American monument on the southern end of the Pennsylvania State Capitol Complex in Harrisburg, Pennsylvania. Officially dedicated in 2020 to commemorate the 100 and 150-year anniversaries of the passing of the Fifteenth Amendment and Nineteenth Amendment, the monument celebrates the power of the vote and commemorates the historic African American community in Harrisburg and the wider Commonwealth of Pennsylvania between 1850 and 1920.

== Description and location ==
Pennsylvania's Commonwealth Monument is located on the southwest side of the Capitol Park, on the northern side of the T. Morris Chester Way, a stretch of Walnut Street between Commonwealth Avenue and Front Street.

The bronze group features four life-size statues of historically significant African American activists (Thomas Morris Chester, Jacob T. Comptom, William Howard Day, and Frances Ellen Watkins Harper), who are represented in the midst of conversation about the recent passage of the Fifteenth Amendment in 1870 that gave African American men the right to vote. These orators stand around a bronze pedestal that features a three-dimensional aerial rendering of the streets and buildings of the Old Eighth Ward, a diverse neighborhood of new immigrants and Black residents demolished in 1911–1917 to create the park that now surrounds the Pennsylvania State Capitol. The sides of the pedestal include renderings of churches, synagogues, businesses, and schools before their destruction and feature a list of names of 100 influential individuals—the 100 Voices—who resided in Harrisburg and advocated for equality, freedom, and justice for the Black community.

The monument cost was $360,000, with donations from the city of Harrisburg, the Foundation for Enhancing Communities (TFEC) and philanthropist Peggy Grove. The monument is located near the corner of North Fourth Street and Walnut Street.

=== 100 Voices inscription ===
The following are the names of the "100 Voices" of prominent people within the African-American community who are featured on the bronze pedestal of the monument:

John Q. Adams, Anne Amos, Aquila Amos, Rosco C. Astwood, James Auter, Frisby Battis, William Battis, Gwendolyn B. Bennett, J. Robbin Bennett, Mary Bennett, A. Dennee Bibb, Josephine L Bibb, Peter S. Blackwell, Janie Blalock-Charleston, Mary Braxton-Roberts, Cassius Brown, Ida Brown, Harry Burrs, Sylvester Burrus, Joseph Cassey Bustill, W. Arthur Carter, W. Justin Carter, Charles J. Carter, David Chester, Amelia Chester, Jane Chester, Maude Coleman, Turner Cooper, Jacob Costley, Charles Crampton, Dorothy Curtis, J. Steward Davis, William R. Dorsey, Alice Dunbar Nelson, William McDonald Felton, Edith Fields, Benjamin J. Foote, Theodore Frye, John Gaitor, George Galbraith, Henry Highland Garnett, James Grant, Harriett Harrison, Walter Hooper, Layton Howard, James H.W. Howard, O.L.C. Hughes, George H. Imes, Spencer P. Irvin, C. Sylvester Jackson, Zacariah Johnson, Leonard Z. Johnson Sr., Hannah Jones, William Jones, William H. Jones, Agnes Kemp, Morris H. Layton Jr., Morris H. Layton Sr., A. Leslie Marshall, Harriet McClintock Marshall, William E. Marshall, William H. Marshall, Jesse Mathews, Catherine McClintock, Mildred Mercer, Maud D. Molson, Percy C. Moore, Robert J. Nelson, Charlotte Newman, Luther Newman, William Parson, Horace Payne, Catherine Payne-Cambell, Esther Popel, Joseph B. Popel, Daniel Potter Sr., Rosabelle Quann, Aubrey Robinson, Laura Robinson, John P. Scott, Hannah Scott-Cannon, John W. Simpson, Ephriam Slaughter, Susan Sophes, Hattie St. Clair-Grant, David Stevens, James Stocks, Colonel Strothers, James Stuart, Matilda Stuart, Annie Summers, Henry H. Summers, Joseph H. Thomas, Josiah T. Walls, Charlotte Weaver, Daniel Webster, Clarence Williams, William Williams, John H. Wolf, Eliza Zedericks

The 100 voices of the pedestal are the subject of a digital book titled One Hundred Voices: Harrisburg's Historic African American Community, 1850-1920, as well as online digital collection of primary and secondary sources.
