= List of tallest buildings in Harrisburg =

Skyline of Harrisburg
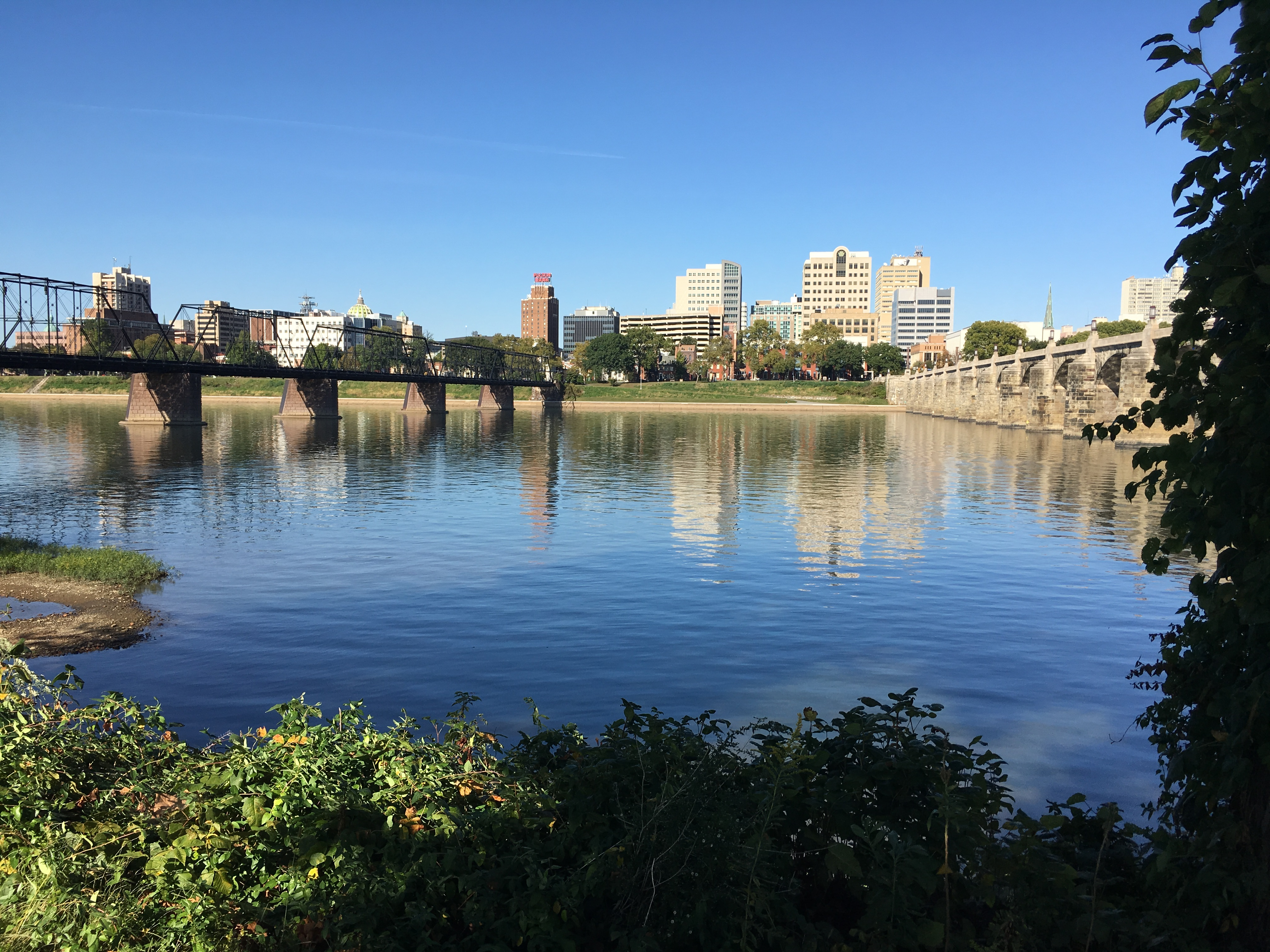
- The skyline of Harrisburg in 2019
- Population: 50,927
- Tallest building: 333 Market Street (1978)
- Tallest building height: 341 ft (104 m)

Number of tall buildings
- Taller than 75 m (246 ft): 7
- Taller than 100 m (328 ft): 1

Number of tall buildings — feet
- Taller than 200 ft (61.0 m): 15
- Taller than 300 ft (91.4 m): 1

Harrisburg is the state capital and 17th-largest city in the U.S. state of Pennsylvania. As of May 2026, the city has a population of 50,927 people. The city currently has 15 buildings which stand over 200 ft (61 m) tall. As of May 2026, the tallest building in Harrisburg is the 341 ft (104 m) tall, 333 Market Street which has 22 floors and was built in 1978. The 2nd-tallest building in Harrisburg as of May 2026 is the 291 ft (89 m) tall, Pennsylvania Place which has 26 floors and was built in 1973, it was also the tallest building in Harrisburg from 1973 to 1978. The most recently completed high-rise to stand over 200 ft (61 m) tall is the 223 ft (68 m) tall, Sylvia H. Rambo U.S. Courthouse which was built in 2023.

== Map of tallest buildings ==
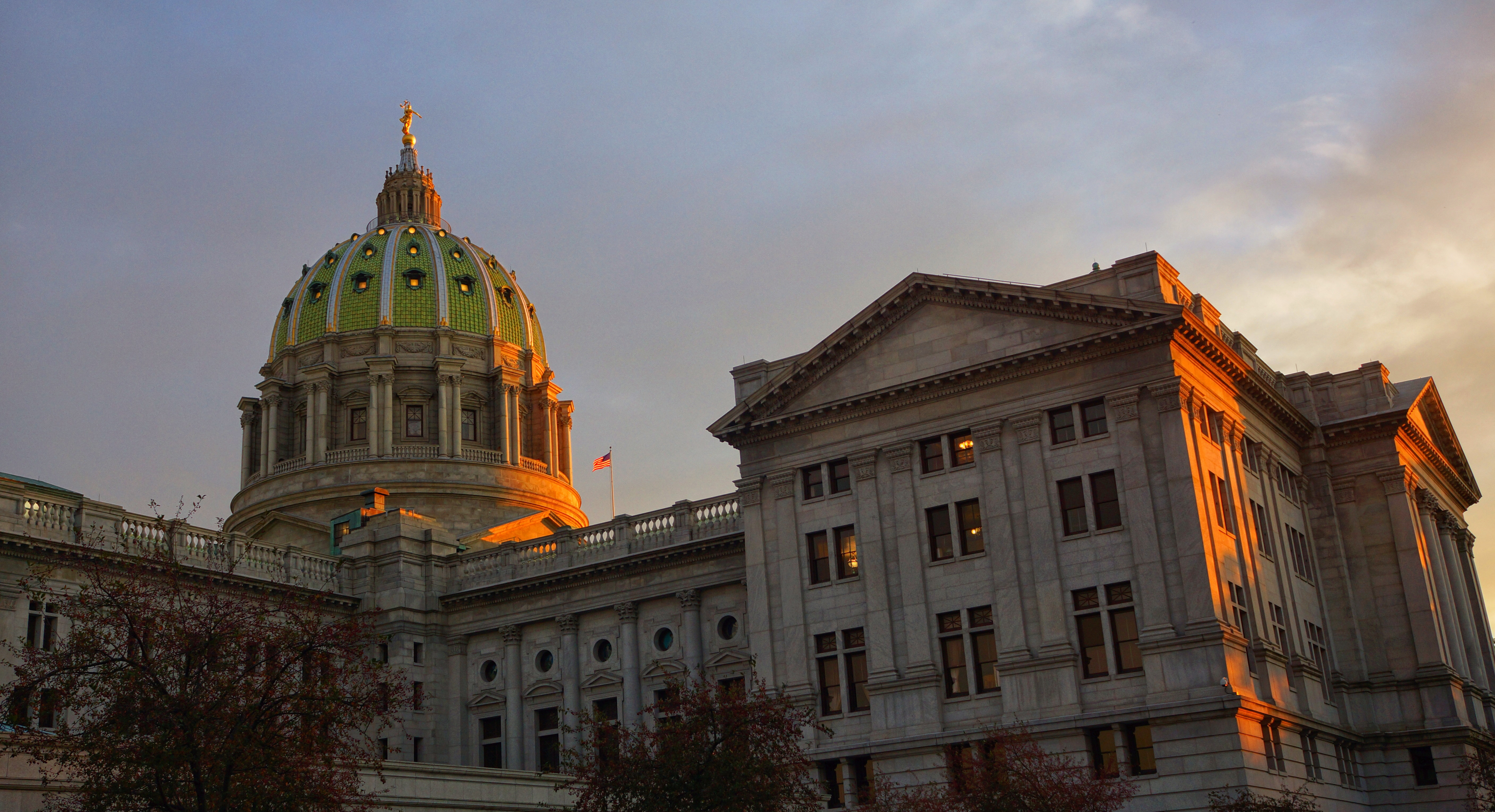
The 272 ft (83 m) tall, Pennsylvania State Capitol stood as the tallest building in Harrisburg from 1906 to 1973, until being surpassed by the 291 ft (89 m) tall, Pennsylvania Place.

The map below shows the locations of the buildings in Harrisburg that stand over 200 ft (61 m) in height. Each marker is given a number based on the buildings ranking in the list. The color of each marker represents the decade that the building was completed in. Most of the tallest buildings in Harrisburg are located in the downtown, except for the Sylvia H. Rambo U.S. Courthouse, the Labor & Industry Building, and the Towne House Apartments.

Buildings in Harrisburg that stand over 200 ft (61 m).
- 1950s and before
- 1960s
- 1970s
- 1980s
- 1990s
- 2000s
- 2010s
- 2020s
1 333 Market Street
2 Pennsylvania Place
3 Pennsylvania State Capitol
4 Presbyterian Apartments
5 Fulton Bank Building
6 Rachel Carson Building
7 Market Square Plaza
8 Strawberry Square
9 Penn National Insurance Plaza
10 Grace United Methodist Church
11 Sylvia H. Rambo U.S. Courthouse
12 St. Patricks Cathedral
13 Labor & Industry Building
14 One South Market Square
15 Towne House Apartments

== Tallest buildings ==
This list ranks buildings in Harrisburg that stand at least 200 ft (61 m) tall. Spires and other architectural details are included in the height of a building, however, antennas are excluded.

Tallest building in Harrisburg upon completion

Rank	Name	Image	Location	Height	Floors	Year	Purpose	Notes	References
1	333 Market Street	Pennsylvania Department of Education Building	40°15′41.10″N 76°52′46.77″W	341 ft (104 m)	22	1978	Office, Government	Tallest building in Harrisburg since 1978.	
2	Pennsylvania Place	Pennsylvania Place	40°15′35.54″N 76°52′42.68″W	291 ft (89 m)	26	1973	Residential	Tallest building in Harrisburg from 1973 to 1978.	
3	Pennsylvania State Capitol	Pennsylvania State Capitol Building 2016	40°15′51.90″N 76°53′01.51″W	272 ft (83 m)	5	1906	Government	Tallest building in Harrisburg from 1906 to 1973.	
4	Presbyterian Apartments	Presbyterian Apartments, South Street	40°15′44.09″N 76°53′10.41″W	260 ft (79 m)	23	1969	Residential		
5	Fulton Bank Building	Fulton Bank, Downtown Harrisburg	40°15′43.10″N 76°52′58.81″W	257 ft (78 m)	21	1930	Office	Originally known as the Harrisburger Hotel until the closure of the hotel in 1968, it was later converted into an office building.	
6	Rachel Carson Building	Rachel Carson Building, Market Street	40°15′45.13″N 76°52′47.92″W	248 ft (76 m)	17	1990	Government, Office	Named after Rachel Carson.	
7	Market Square Plaza	Market Square Plaza	40°15′37.68″N 76°52′56.95″W	246 ft (75 m)	18	2005	Office		
8	Strawberry Square	Strawberry Square	40°15′44.13″N 76°52′51.95″W	240 ft (73 m)	17	1977	Office		
9	Penn National Insurance Plaza	Penn National Insurance Plaza	40°15′34.05″N 76°52′56.71″W	229 ft (70 m)	16	1996	Office	Headquarters for Penn National Insurance.	
10	Grace United Methodist Church	Grace United Methodist Church	40°15′50.13″N 76°53′09.35″W	226 ft (69 m)		1880	Religion	Tallest building in Harrisburg from 1880 to 1906.	
11	Sylvia H. Rambo U.S. Courthouse	Rambo USCH	40°16′26.40″N 76°53′08.24″W	223 ft (68 m)	12	2023	Government	Designed by Ennead Architects.	
12	St. Patricks Cathedral	St. Patrick Catholic Cathedral, State Street	40°15′49.56″N 76°53′12.04″W	221 ft (67 m)		1907	Religion		
13	Labor & Industry Building	Labor & Industry Building	40°16′07.69″N 76°52′57.85″W	219 ft (67 m)	18	1955	Government, Office		
14	One South Market Square	One South Market Square – as seen from City Island	40°15′35.70″N 76°52′52.41″W	207 ft (63 m)	14	1990	Office		
15	Towne House Apartments	Towne House Apartments	40°16′09.42″N 76°53′03.73″W	205 ft (62 m)	20	1961	Residential		

== Timeline of tallest buildings ==
Name	Image	Years as tallest	Height	Floors
Grace United Methodist Church	Grace Methodist Church	1880-1906	226 ft (69 m)	
Pennsylvania State Capitol	Pennsylvania State Capitol	1906-1973	272 ft (83 m)	5
Pennsylvania Place	Pennsylvania Place	1973-1978	291 ft (89 m)	26
333 Market Street	Pennsylvania Department of Education Building	1978-Present	341 ft (104 m)	22

== See also ==
- List of tallest buildings in Pennsylvania
- List of tallest buildings in Philadelphia
- List of tallest buildings in Pittsburgh
- List of tallest buildings in Reading, Pennsylvania
