= Susquehanna Art Museum =

Non-collecting art museum in Harrisburg, Pennsylvania

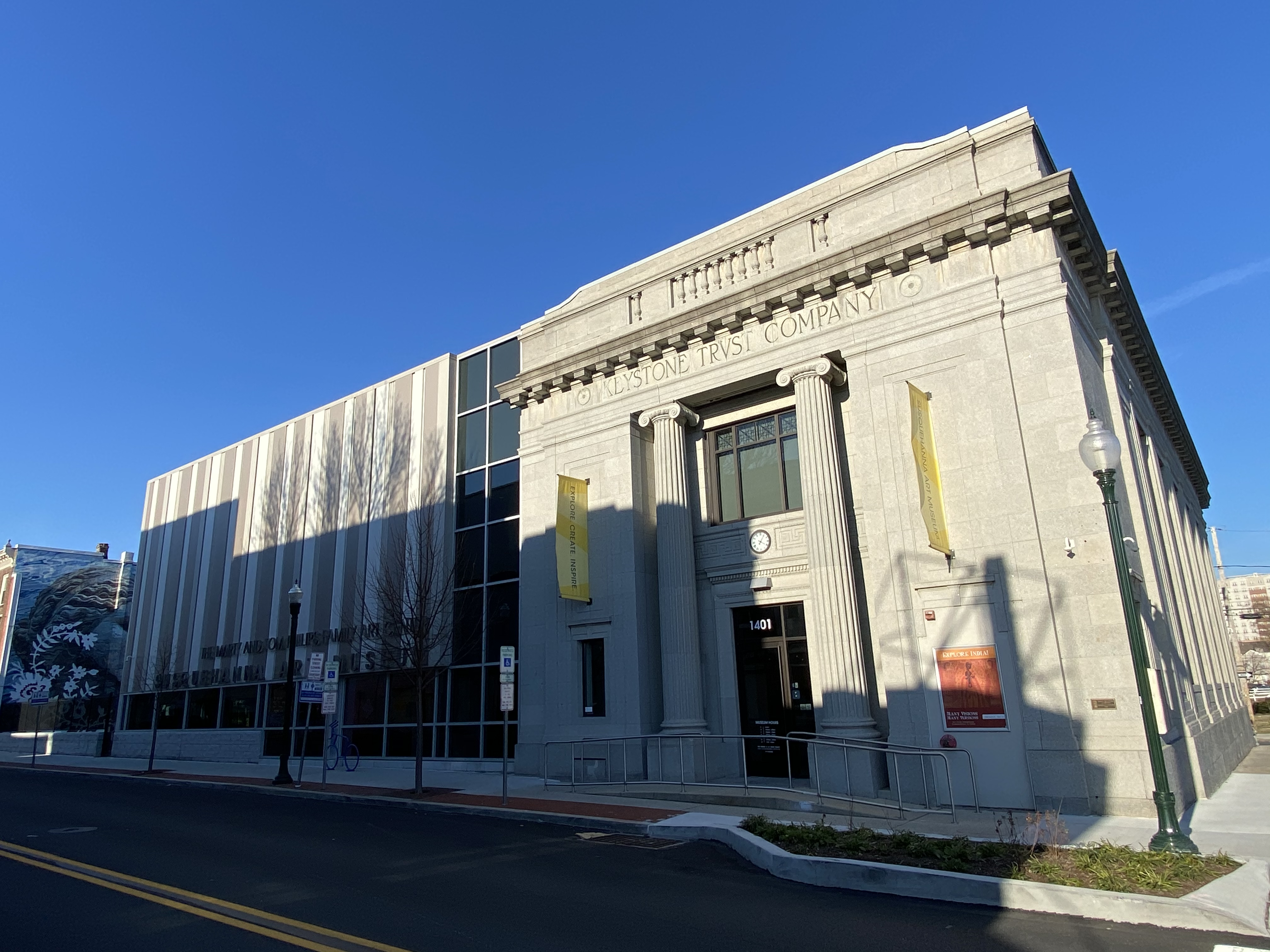
- The museum as seen in February 2020
- Established: 1989
- Location: 1401 North Third Street, Harrisburg, Pennsylvania 17102, United States
- Coordinates: 40.27085°N 76.88971°W
- Type: Art museum
- Visitors: 16,555 (2019)
- Architect: EwingCole
- Public transit access: Capital Area Transit
- Parking: On-site & on-street
- Website: susquehannaartmuseum.org

The Susquehanna Art Museum (SAM) is a non-profit art museum located in the Midtown neighborhood of Harrisburg, Pennsylvania, the state's capital. Founded in 1989 by a group of central Pennsylvania art educators, it is the only dedicated art museum in Central Pennsylvania. SAM operates as a non-collecting institution, meaning its galleries display a rotating schedule of borrowed and traveling exhibitions rather than a permanent collection. It is a member of the North American Reciprocal Museum Association.

After more than two decades of nomadic operation across a series of temporary spaces, SAM opened its permanent home in January 2015 at 1401 North Third Street, occupying an adaptively reused 1916 bank building expanded and renovated by the Philadelphia architectural firm EwingCole. The 20,000-square-foot facility features preserved neoclassical interiors, including 27-foot gold leaf ceilings, and a converted bank vault that serves as an intimate exhibition gallery.

SAM mounts more than a dozen exhibitions per year drawn from museums, private collections, commercial galleries, and individual artists, drawn from local, regional, national, and international sources. Its outreach program, VanGo! Museum on Wheels, was founded in 1992 and serves communities across a roughly 100-mile radius of Harrisburg. The museum also operates public art and community education initiatives.

== History ==
=== Founding and early years ===
The museum's origins trace to the 1970s, when a group of local artists and art educators began meeting in Harrisburg to discuss the absence of a dedicated art museum in the state capital. Pennsylvania was among a small number of states without a dedicated art museum in its capital city. Early gatherings were hosted by Clyde McGeary, then senior arts adviser for the Pennsylvania Department of Education, who later recalled the group as "basically a bunch of art teachers from local districts, along with other community people" who "knew that an art museum was long overdue in Harrisburg."

The institution formally launched in 1989, operating initially as an itinerant museum without walls, collecting and displaying works, mostly from regional artists, in rented or borrowed spaces. Among its earliest exhibitions was an art and healing show at the Milton S. Hershey Medical Center. The museum operated with support from community and business leaders and a network of volunteers.

=== Early locations ===
For the first two and a half decades of its existence, SAM operated out of a series of temporary and borrowed spaces, including donated space provided by the State Museum of Pennsylvania. The museum also resided at Strawberry Square, a downtown Harrisburg shopping and office complex, before moving in 2000 to the Kunkel Building, also known as the Feller Building, at 301 Market Street in Harrisburg's central business district, where the museum occupied between 5,000 and 6,000 square feet of exhibition space. Both Strawberry Square and the Kunkel Building are owned by Harristown Development Corp. At the Kunkel Building, SAM was joined by the Doshi Gallery for Contemporary Art, a gallery founded by artist Maya Schock in 1972 that focused on regional contemporary artists. A portion of the exhibit space was dedicated to Doshi programming, and the gallery became closely identified with SAM's public presence, including hosting exhibitions at the State Museum of Pennsylvania during the years SAM was without a permanent home.

- Kunkel Building
- U.S. National Register of Historic Places
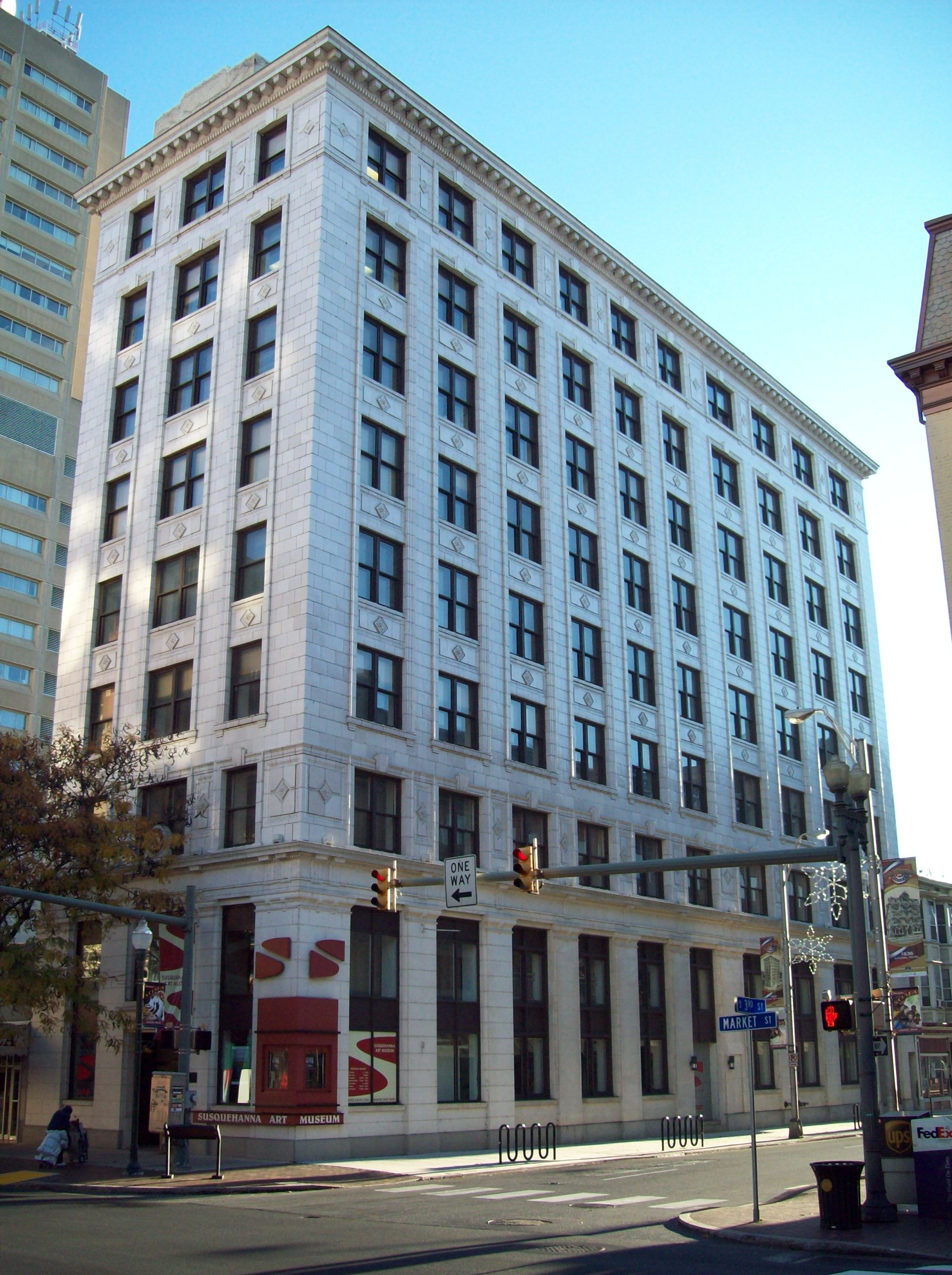
- Kunkel Building, November 2010
- Location: 301 Market St., Harrisburg, Pennsylvania
- Area: 0.1 acres (0.040 ha)
- Built: 1914
- Architect: Mowbray and Uffinger
- Architectural style: Chicago, Late 19th And Early 20th Century American Movements
- NRHP reference No.: 82001534
- Added to NRHP: November 9, 1982

The Kunkel Building was originally constructed as a bank in 1913, expanded to the rear in 1925, and later converted to a department store. It is listed on the National Register of Historic Places. The building now serves as a dormitory for Harrisburg University students.

=== Move to a permanent home ===
SAM closed its Kunkel Building location in December 2010 with the aim of finding a permanent, purpose-built home. Board president Stephen A. Moore cited the pursuit of accreditation from the American Alliance of Museums as the primary driver, describing it as critical to attracting a higher caliber of exhibitions; the process requires rigorous standards for climate control, security, and transportation facilities that the Kunkel Building could not easily meet. The board sought a space of 15,000 to 20,000 square feet, two to three times the existing exhibition area. The museum selected the 1916 Keystone Trust Company building at 1401 North Third Street, at the corner of North Third and Calder streets, as its base and commissioned EwingCole to lead the renovation and expansion. The project was funded by a $5.5 million state redevelopment grant secured under Governor Ed Rendell and $1.5 million raised by the museum through a mortgage with Fulton Bank, bringing the total project cost to $7.5 million. Construction began in late spring 2014, combining adaptive reuse of the former bank building with a new two-story addition to create a 20,000-square-foot facility. The move to a purpose-built facility prompted a dispute over the future of the Doshi Gallery. In the new SAM, Doshi was allocated one three-month exhibition per year in a first-floor lobby space rather than the dedicated permanent presence it had occupied at the Kunkel Building. Artist Jo Margolis, a longtime SAM board member who had exhibited with Doshi over many years, resigned in protest, arguing that Doshi artists had been kept in the dark about the change while they had maintained the museum's public presence during the four-year transition period. "They made it clear to me that they had bigger fish to fry," she said. Executive Director Laurene Buckley, who held a doctorate in art history and museum studies from the City University of New York and had previously led the Castellani Art Museum at Niagara University, defended the change as necessary to expand the museum's programming scope, while board president Jack Scott expressed confidence that a resolution would be reached.

SAM opened to the public on the evening of January 16, 2015, with full construction completed in 2016. Mayor Eric Papenfuse described the opening as a catalyst for the entire city, while developer Joshua Kesler, whose nearby venue The Millworks was then under construction, credited SAM's 2010 decision to occupy the building as the encouragement he needed to invest in Midtown. The inaugural exhibition, "Pop Open: Icons of Pop Art," was drawn from the Castellani Art Museum at Niagara University and included approximately fifty works by mid-20th-century artists including Andy Warhol, Robert Indiana, Marisol, Roy Lichtenstein, Claes Oldenburg, and Robert Rauschenberg. The collection had not previously traveled outside Niagara University. It was followed by "Everyone Can Fly: Faith Ringgold's 'Tar Beach' & Regional Picture Book Illustrators," which recreated the rooftop setting from Faith Ringgold's children's classic.

== Building ==
The addition features a metal-and-glass facade designed to complement the scale and color of the original neoclassical bank building . The interior transformation preserved and restored several original features, including 27-foot gold leaf ceilings in the entrance gallery. The original bank vault door remains in place at the rear of the lobby, immobilized and preserved as a historical artifact; executive director Laurene Buckley noted at the time of opening that removing it would have required demolition. The vault itself was converted into the DeSoto Family Vault, an intimate gallery space used for smaller and site-responsive exhibitions, as well as weekly story time programming for children. The Doshi Gallery occupies the lobby gallery for one three-month exhibition per year. The second-floor Beverlee and Bill Lehr Gallery is designed to host major traveling and feature exhibitions and also functions as an event venue. Certain galleries were built with environmental controls to accommodate sensitive or traveling works. The museum includes an outdoor sculpture garden, on a wall overlooking which hangs a mural by Messiah College professor Daniel Finch.

== Staff ==
Lauren Nye joined SAM around 2014 as Exhibition Manager and was later promoted to Director of Exhibitions, a position she held for approximately eight years. A 2010 graduate of Millersville University with a BFA in sculpture and art history, she had previously served as gallery director at Isadore Gallery and at Tellus360, both in Lancaster. During her tenure, Nye managed all incoming and outgoing exhibitions, overseeing shipping, insurance, contracts, and loan agreements, while developing approximately one original curatorial project per year alongside the museum's broader schedule of traveling and collaborative exhibitions. She has served as a juror and judge at arts organizations including the Berks Art Council, the Whitaker Center for Science and the Arts, Carlisle Arts Learning Center, Creative York, and Millersville University, where she was the first alumna juror in the institution's exhibition history. Following her departure from SAM, Nye joined the Hunter Museum of American Art in Chattanooga, Tennessee as Associate Curator and also serves on the SAM board of trustees.

Nye was succeeded as Director of Exhibitions by Rachel O'Connor, who had previously served as curator at the Art Association of Harrisburg.

== Programs ==
=== Exhibitions ===
As a non-collecting museum, SAM mounts more than twelve exhibitions per year, featuring the work of local, regional, national, and international artists. Exhibitions are borrowed from other museums, private collections, commercial galleries, and individual artists. On the third Friday of each month, SAM participates in Third in the Burg, a city-wide cultural event during which the museum extends its hours and offers free admission.

=== Education ===
Educational programming for adults includes classes, lectures, workshops, and critiques. Youth programs cover drawing, painting, sculpture, art history, and art appreciation.

=== VanGo! Museum on Wheels ===
SAM operates the VanGo! Museum on Wheels, an outreach program founded in 1992 to bring art to communities across the region. The program began with a repurposed city bus, which was later replaced by a refurbished school bus, before transitioning to a recreational vehicle equipped with rotating interactive exhibits. VanGo operates within a roughly 100-mile radius of Harrisburg, visiting schools, libraries, colleges, conventions, and other museums across Dauphin, Cumberland, and Lancaster counties. Each visit includes a tour of the vehicle, a group assembly, and a hands-on activity. The program is designed primarily for students but is intended to be accessible to all ages.

=== Public art ===
In 2014, SAM commissioned a public mural as part of a broader effort to establish a visual presence in Midtown Harrisburg. Director of Exhibitions Lauren Nye coordinated the installation of a 1,400-square-foot outdoor mural on a wall facing the museum's permanent location at 1401 North Third Street, inviting local artists to submit proposals through a juried process tied to Harrisburg's annual Gallery Walk.

In 2022, SAM partnered with Verizon to transform a 5G cell pole installed directly in front of the museum into a public artwork, believed to be the first such project of its kind in the United States. The pole was wrapped in a colorful abstract design by Harrisburg artist Stephen Michael Haas. The project grew out of community concerns over the aesthetic impact of the poles, of which Verizon installed over 100 across the city. Executive Director Alice Anne Schwab described the collaboration as a model for working with corporate partners to benefit the surrounding neighborhood.

== Selected exhibitions ==
| Title | Year | Description |
|---|---|---|
| Pop Open | 2015 | Opening exhibition drawn from the Castellani Art Museum at Niagara University, featuring approximately fifty works by mid-20th-century pop art artists including Andy Warhol, Robert Indiana, Marisol, Roy Lichtenstein, Claes Oldenburg, and Robert Rauschenberg |
| Philip Pearlstein: Seventy Five Years of Painting | 2017 | A survey of the career of figurative realist painter Philip Pearlstein, spanning work from his student years through paintings completed shortly before the exhibition opened. Pearlstein, a Pittsburgh native and longtime New York-based artist, attended the opening and spent a day with local high school and college students at the museum. |
| PICASSO: A Life in Print | 2019 | A survey of prints spanning Pablo Picasso's career from 1904 to 1970, drawn from the collection of the John Szoke Gallery in New York City. The exhibition included works from the Suite des Saltimbanques, Picasso's first major body of printmaking; the Suite Vollard, a series of one hundred prints commissioned by art dealer Ambroise Vollard; and the Caisse à Remords. The exhibit ran through September 22, 2019. |
| Dreams: Selections from Easton Nights | 2019–2020 | Curated by Director of Exhibitions Lauren Nye, this selection of urban landscape photography by Easton, Pennsylvania-based photographer Peter Ydeen documented the city of Easton at night through the use of artificial light, color, and composition. The exhibition was displayed in the DeSoto Family Vault and ran through January 12, 2020. |
| The Modernists: Witnesses to the 20th Century | 2020–2021 | An exhibition conceived and curated by Director of Exhibitions Lauren Nye, who developed approximately one original curatorial project per year alongside the museum's broader schedule. The show surveyed international art from the dawn of the 20th century through the early 1960s, stopping short of postmodernism. Artists included Marc Chagall, Wassily Kandinsky, Egon Schiele, Gustav Klimt, Albert Bloch, N.C. Wyeth, Alma Thomas, and Felrath Hines, among others. The exhibition ran through May 16, 2021 in the Lehr Gallery. |
| Color Improvisations 2 | | Invitational exhibition of contemporary quilts curated by Nancy Crow |
| Queremos Justicia: How We Shutdown Berks | | Exhibition exploring art and immigration activism, featuring works by the Shut Down Berks Coalition |
| Art and Activism at Tougaloo College | | Exhibition examining the relationship between artistic expression and civil rights activism, connected to Tougaloo College, a historically Black college in Mississippi |
| American Identity: Restoring the Susquehanna River's Artistic Legacy | | Exhibition drawn from the Fridenberg collection examining regional artistic heritage along the Susquehanna River |
| Diane Arbus: 10 Years | 2023–2024 | A traveling exhibition curated by Catlin Langford from the collection of Gary Johns, presenting photographs from 1961 to 1971. The show examined Diane Arbus' documentary approach to marginalized communities. Organized by Curatorial Exhibitions, Pasadena, California. |
| Edvard Munch: Works on Paper from the John Szoke Gallery | 2024–2025 | An exhibition of works on paper by Norwegian artist Edvard Munch, drawn from the John Szoke Gallery in New York City, which specializes in prints by Picasso and Munch. The show ran from November 16, 2024 through January 19, 2025. |
| Tribute to the Civil Rights Movement: Quilted Swing Coats | 2025 | Works by Patricia A. Montgomery celebrating African American women who contributed to the Civil Rights Movement |
| Works by SoHyun Bae | 2025 | Thematic retrospective exploring cultural memory, Korean history, Jewish mysticism, and the natural world |
| 10th Anniversary Exhibition | 2025 | Celebration of a decade of programming at SAM's permanent Midtown location |
