= Capital Area School for the Arts =

Public arts high school in Harrisburg, Pennsylvania

Coordinates: 40.2617°N 76.8821°W

Capital Area School for the Arts Charter School

Location
- 150 Strawberry Square; Harrisburg, Dauphin County, Pennsylvania; USA

Information
- Type: Public arts high school
- Established: 2001
- Oversight: Harrisburg City School District, Pennsylvania Department of Education
- President: Alicia McDonald, President of Board of Trustees
- Principal: Erica Leonard, Principal
- Teaching staff: 22 teachers (2019-2020)
- Grades: 9–12 (high school)
- Enrollment: 200 pupils (2019-2020)
- Campus: Urban
- Mascot: Chameleon
- Accreditation: Pennsylvania Department of Education
- Budget: $2,029,994.17 (2014-15)
- Affiliations: Capital Area IU
- Website: http://www.casa-arts.org

The Capital Area School for the Arts (CASA) is a 9th to 12th grade, public charter school located in Harrisburg, Pennsylvania.

The school began as an arts magnet school, which was founded in 2001 as a partnership between the Capital Area Intermediate Unit and Open Stage of Harrisburg (a regional professional theater group). After first moving through several sites in downtown Harrisburg, the school now resides in its permanent location in the first and third floor of Strawberry Square.

CASA utilizes a 21st-century, hybrid model of teaching and learning. The curriculum is designed to meet all of the Pennsylvania Core State Standards. In 2013, the school received charter status and converted to an intensive, all-day academic and arts high school. CASA Charter School was approved in May 2013 for five years.

Students apply to attend the school, with an audition required. If more applications are made than there are slots available, the school is required by law to conduct a lottery for admission. Students from public schools in Dauphin County, Cumberland County and Perry County have attended the school.

CASA is located in the downtown area of the city of Harrisburg. Students have the opportunity to use the city as the "classroom", including the numerous resources offered (such as the nearby Susquehanna Art Museum and the Whitaker Center for Science and the Arts). Students must attend one of two sessions daily, and choose one of six artistic areas, such as visual arts, film and media arts, music, dance, or theater. Beginning in the 2010–2011 school year, a creative writing discipline was added for PM classes. Morning classes are studio-based while afternoon classes focus on collaborative interdisciplinary work. The culmination of the afternoon classes' work is a one-night student-produced performance at the nearby Whitaker Center for Science and the Arts.
