= SoMa, Harrisburg, Pennsylvania =

SoMa
- Neighborhood of Harrisburg
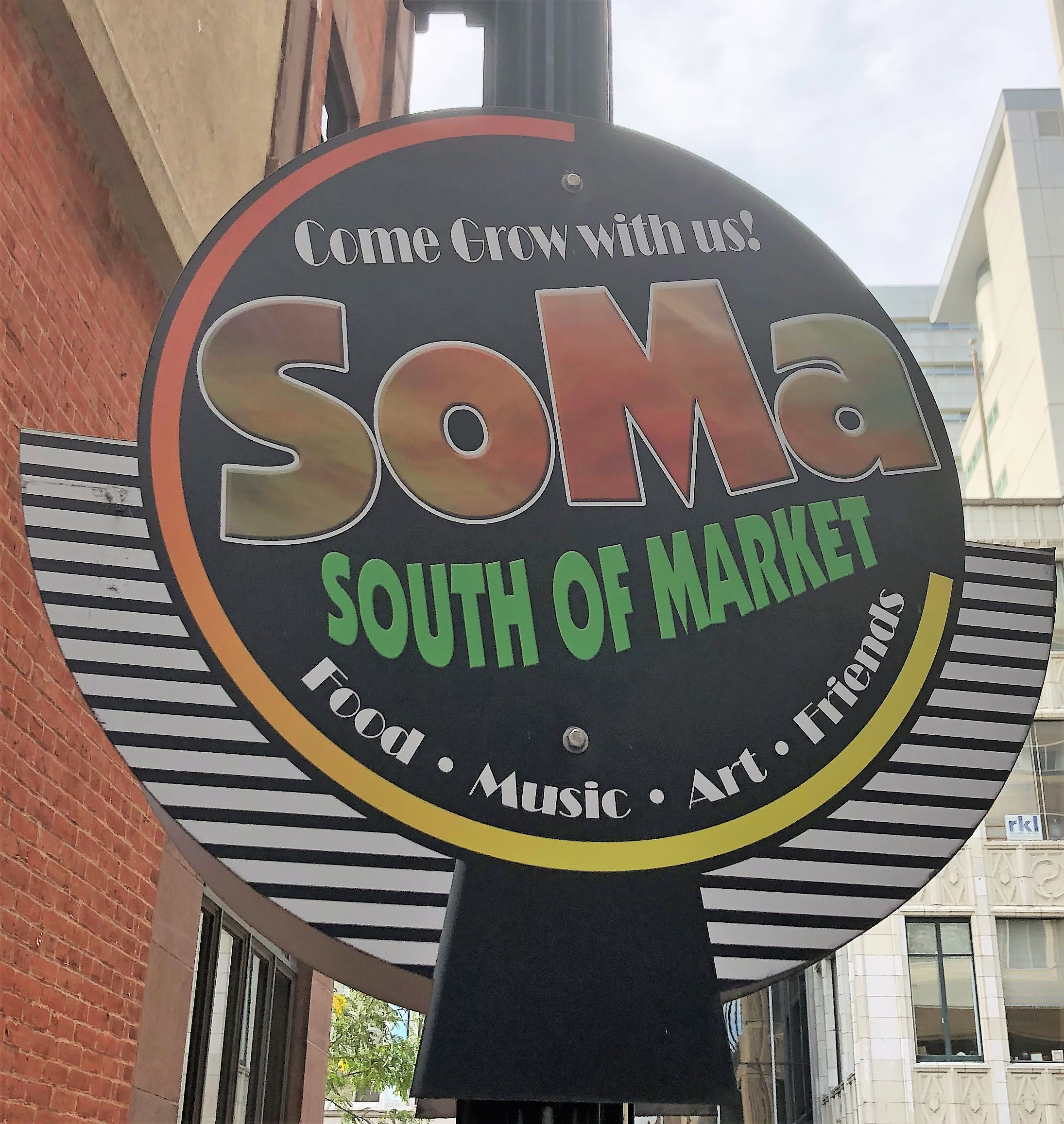
- A SoMA sign hanging in Dewberry Street off Market Street
- Interactive map of SoMa
- Coordinates: 40.2606°N 76.8803°W
- Country: United States
- State: Pennsylvania
- County: Dauphin County
- City: Harrisburg
- ZIP code: 17101
- Area codes: 717 and 223
- Website: Neighborhood Website

SoMa, or South of Market Street, is a neighborhood in Downtown Harrisburg, Pennsylvania around South Third Street, bounded by Market to the north, 3rd to the west, Chestnut to the south, and 4th to the east. The name "SoMa" derives from the area being "South of Market Street", coined by Harristown Enterprises in 2007 to rebrand the South Third Street area for new development relating to international business and the arts. Eight restored historic buildings became 20 apartments branded as "SoMa on Third". The area is a popular housing area for students attending the nearby Harrisburg University. The area contains popular retail and bar & restaurant destinations and hosts frequent block parties in which they participate with other incoming vendors and entertainment.

== See also ==
- List of Harrisburg neighborhoods
