= 333 Market Street (Harrisburg, Pennsylvania) =

Skyscraper in Harrisburg

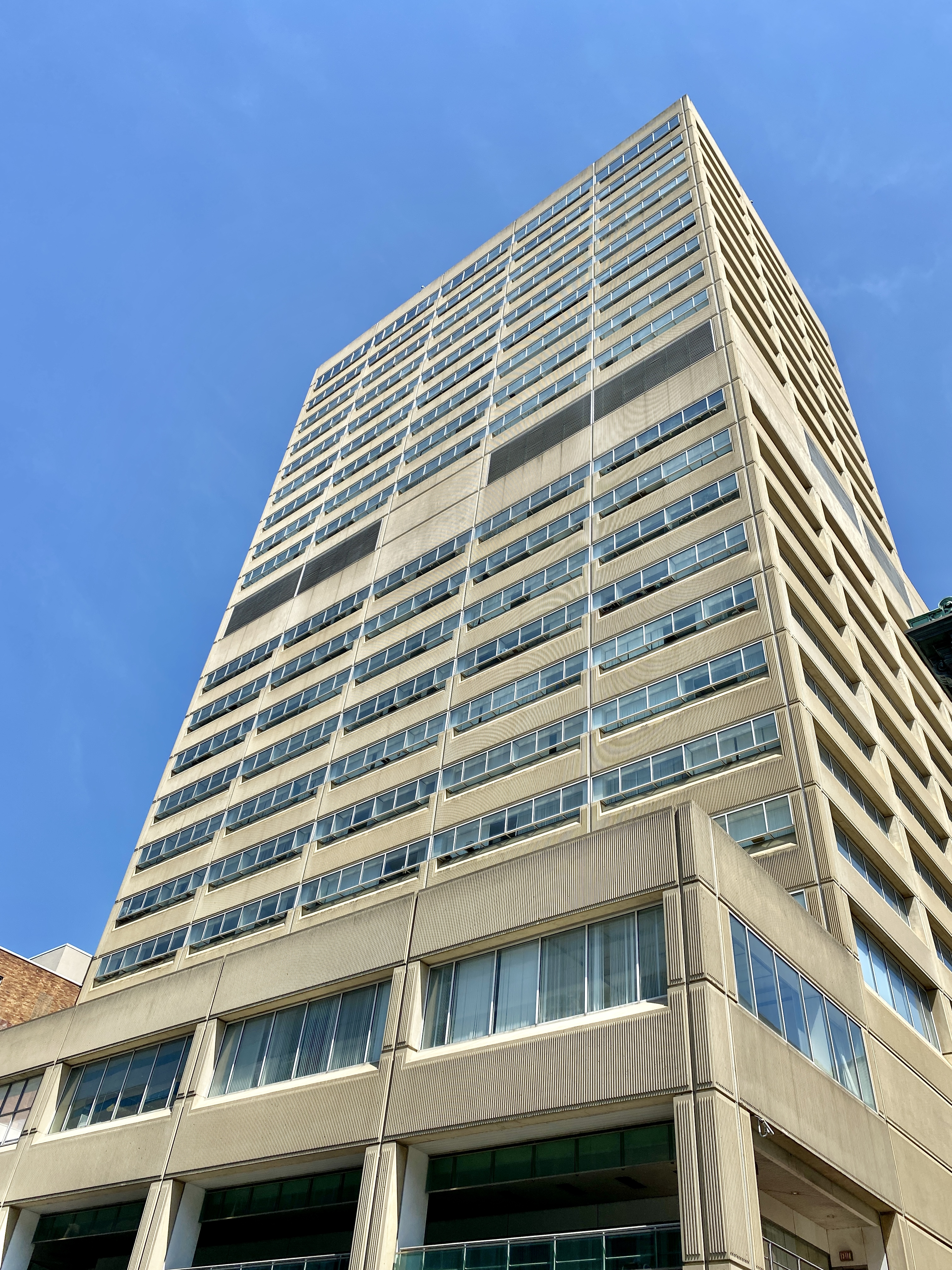
- Pennsylvania_Department_of_Education_Building,_Market_Street,_Harrisburg,_PA_-_52429888991 333 Market Street in 2022

- Location within Pennsylvania 333 Market Street (Harrisburg, Pennsylvania) (the United States)

General information
- Status: Completed
- Architectural style: Modern
- Location: 333 Market Street, Harrisburg, Pennsylvania, United States
- Coordinates: 40°15′41″N 76°52′47″W
- Completed: 1978

Height
- Roof: 341 ft (104 m)

Technical details
- Floor count: 22

333 Market Street (also known as the Pennsylvania Department of Education Building and the PDE Building) is a 341 ft (104 m) tall modern office building located on 333 Market Street in downtown Harrisburg, Pennsylvania. The building has 22 floors and was built in 1978. The building has been the tallest building in Harrisburg since 1978, surpassing the 291 ft (89 m) tall Pennsylvania Place which was built in 1973. The building also is the tallest building between Philadelphia and Pittsburgh.

The building was built during the first phase of the Harristown Urban Renewal Plan, which aimed to create more state office space in the Central Business District.

The building is a part of the Pennsylvania State Capitol Complex.

The upper floors of the building are planned to be converted into senior housing, the renovations are expected to occur during 2026.

== See also ==
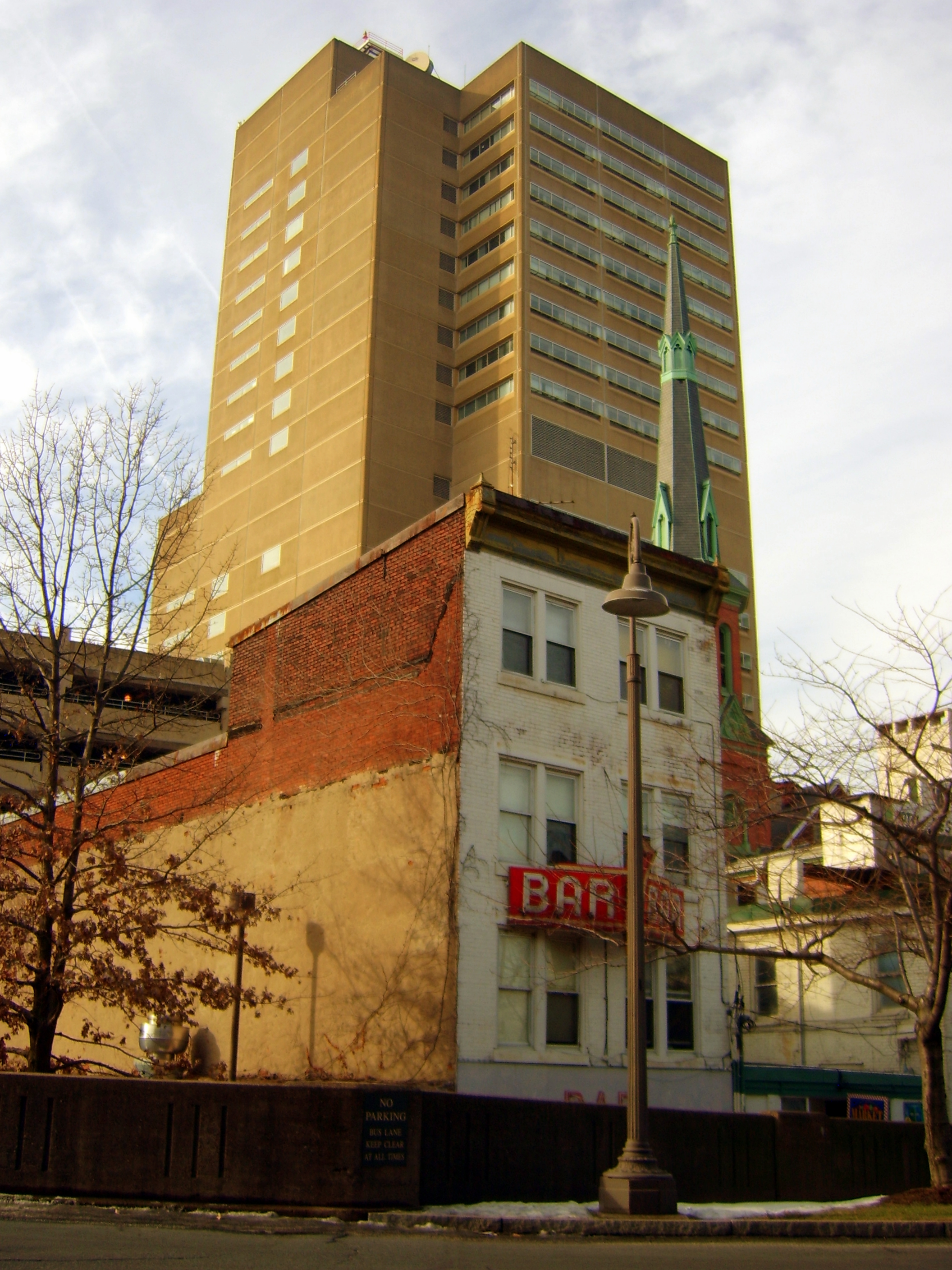
333 Market Street in 2004

- Market Square, Harrisburg, Pennsylvania
- Strawberry Square
- Keystone Building (Harrisburg, Pennsylvania)
- Pennsylvania State Capitol
