= Penn National =

Penn National may refer to:

- Penn Entertainment, an American-Canadian casino, horse racing, and sports betting operator formerly known as Penn National Gaming
- Penn National Insurance, a Pennsylvania-based insurance company
- Penn National Race Course, a horse racing track in Grantville, Pennsylvania, United States, owned by Penn Entertainment
