= Uncas A. Whitaker =

American mechanical and electrical engineer

- U. A. Whitaker
- Born: March 22, 1900; Lincoln, Kansas
- Died: September 1975 (aged 75); Maine
- Occupations: Mechanical engineer Chemical engineer lawyer entrepreneur philanthropist

Uncas Aeneas Whitaker (March 22, 1900 – September 1975) was a prominent mechanical engineer, electrical engineer, lawyer, entrepreneur, and philanthropist. Raised in Missouri, he received a mechanical engineering degree at the Massachusetts Institute of Technology, an electrical engineering degree from Carnegie Institute of Technology and a law degree from the Cleveland Law School. At the age of 41, he founded Aircraft Marine Products (AMP), in Harrisburg, Pennsylvania, which would become the world's largest manufacturer of electrical devices and connectors. His company was instrumental in the development of miniature components and advanced computer technologies which have been incorporated into thousands of business operations and commercial products.

When Whitaker died in 1975, he left part of his fortune for a foundation to improve people's lives primarily by supporting Biomedical engineering research and education. Money provided for the Whitaker Foundation by Whitaker and his wife, Helen Whitaker, totaled $120 million. In 1994, the foundation was the sixty-first largest foundation in the United States with assets of $340 million and annual expenditures of $26 million.

During his lifetime, Whitaker also created a philanthropic program to improve the quality of life in the Harrisburg area, AMP's home community. Today the Harrisburg-area Regional Program continues this initiative.

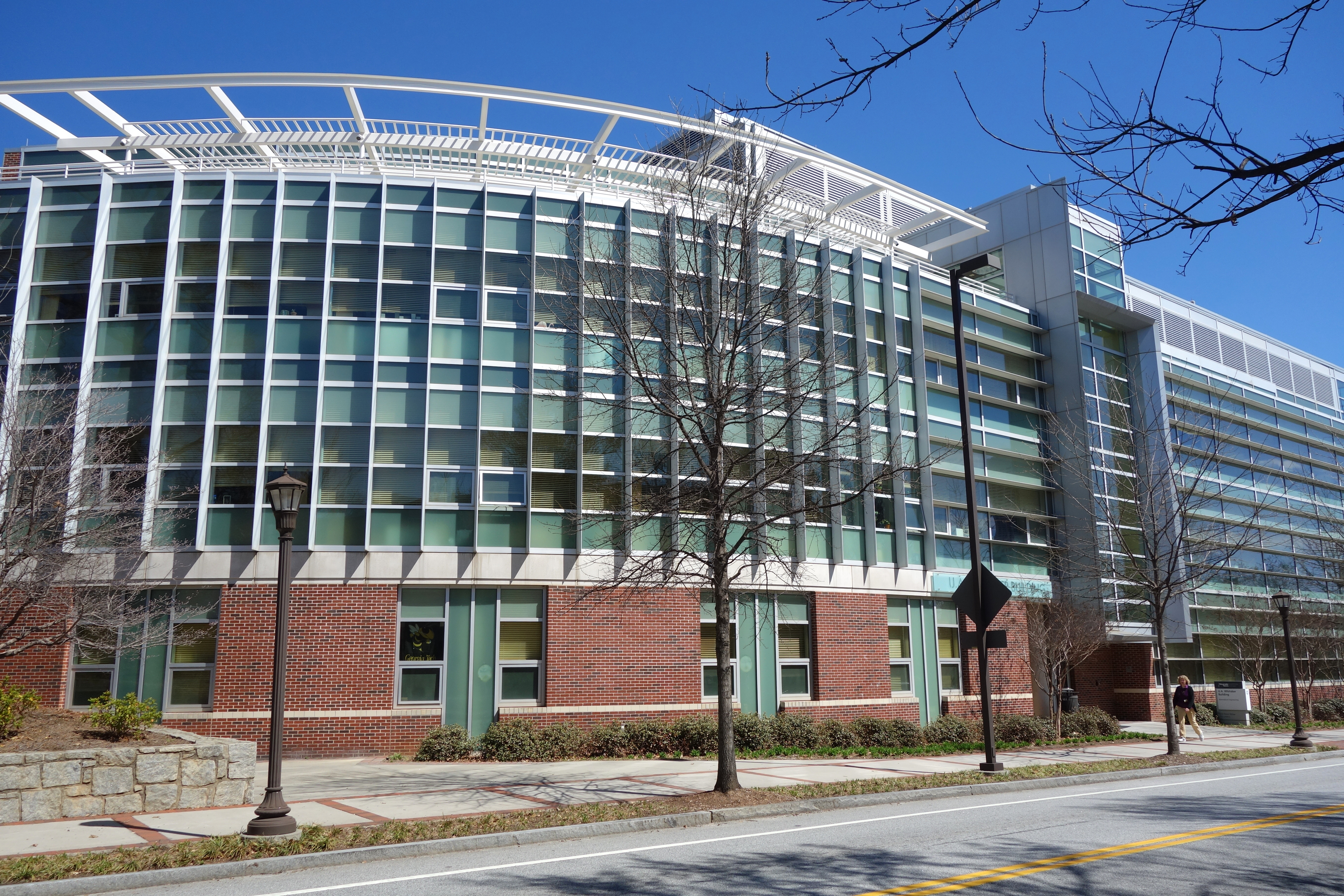
U.A. Whitaker Building on the main campus of the Georgia Institute of Technology

Notable things named after U. A. Whitaker include:

- Whitaker Institute of Biomedical Engineering at the University of California, San Diego
- The Whitaker Biomedical Engineering Institute at the Johns Hopkins University School of Medicine
- U.A. Whitaker Building at the Georgia Institute of Technology, which houses the Wallace H. Coulter Department of Biomedical Engineering, dedicated in 2002.
- Whitaker Center for Science and the Arts located in Harrisburg, Pennsylvania, dedicated 2000.
- U.A. Whitaker College of Engineering at Florida Gulf Coast University, located in Fort Myers, Florida.
- Uncas A. and Helen F. Whitaker Building for the Life Sciences at the Massachusetts Institute of Technology.
- Uncas A. Whitaker Hall for Biomedical Engineering at Washington University in St. Louis.

== See also ==
- Whitaker Foundation
