= Downtown Harrisburg, Pennsylvania =

Coordinates: 40.25969°N 76.88165°W

Downtown
- Neighborhood in Harrisburg
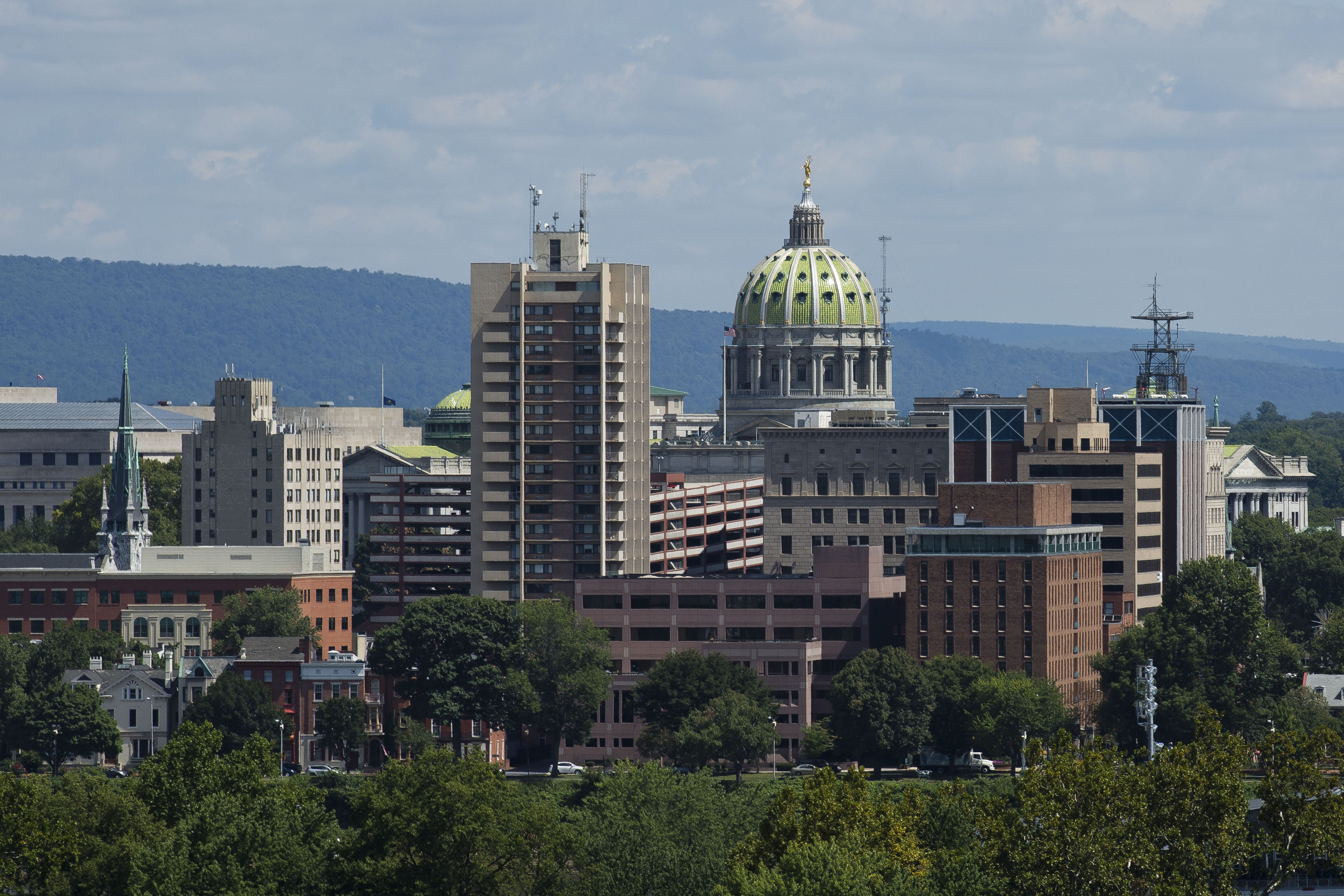
- Downtown Harrisburg with City Island in foreground
- Interactive map of Downtown
- Country: United States
- State: Pennsylvania
- County: Dauphin
- City: Harrisburg
- Area codes: 717 and 223

Downtown Harrisburg is the central core neighborhood, business and government center which surrounds the focal point of Market Square, and serves as the regional center for the greater metropolitan area of Harrisburg, Pennsylvania, United States.

Harrisburg's downtown Center City comprises the original 80-acre (320,000 m^{2}) borough laid out in a grid pattern by John Harris in 1785. East–west streets are named and north–south streets are numbered. Market Street, running east–west, is the dividing point between north and south street designations.

Harrisburg's Central Business District includes the Pennsylvania State Capitol Complex and other state government offices, the Dauphin County Courthouse and other county government offices, City of Harrisburg offices, Pennsylvania State Museum, federal government offices, and other, non-government related commercial retail and office development. Some residential development, both in apartment high-rises and in the upper floors of mixed commercial/residential use buildings, is also located in the downtown area.

Downtown is bordered in the northwest by the mixed commercial/residential use Capitol District, in the west by the Susquehanna River, in the southwest by the largely residential Shipoke neighborhood, in the south by Interstate 83, in the east by Amtrak and Norfolk Southern Railway lines, and in the north by Midtown Harrisburg, a mixed-use commercial and residential neighborhood. Forster Street is usually considered the boundary between Downtown and Midtown Harrisburg. City Island, located in the middle of the Susquehanna River directly west of downtown, is typically considered part of Downtown Harrisburg.

== Demographics ==
From the 2020 census, the 2022 American Community Survey estimated that there were 2,637 people living downtown.

== Culture ==
=== Restaurant Row ===
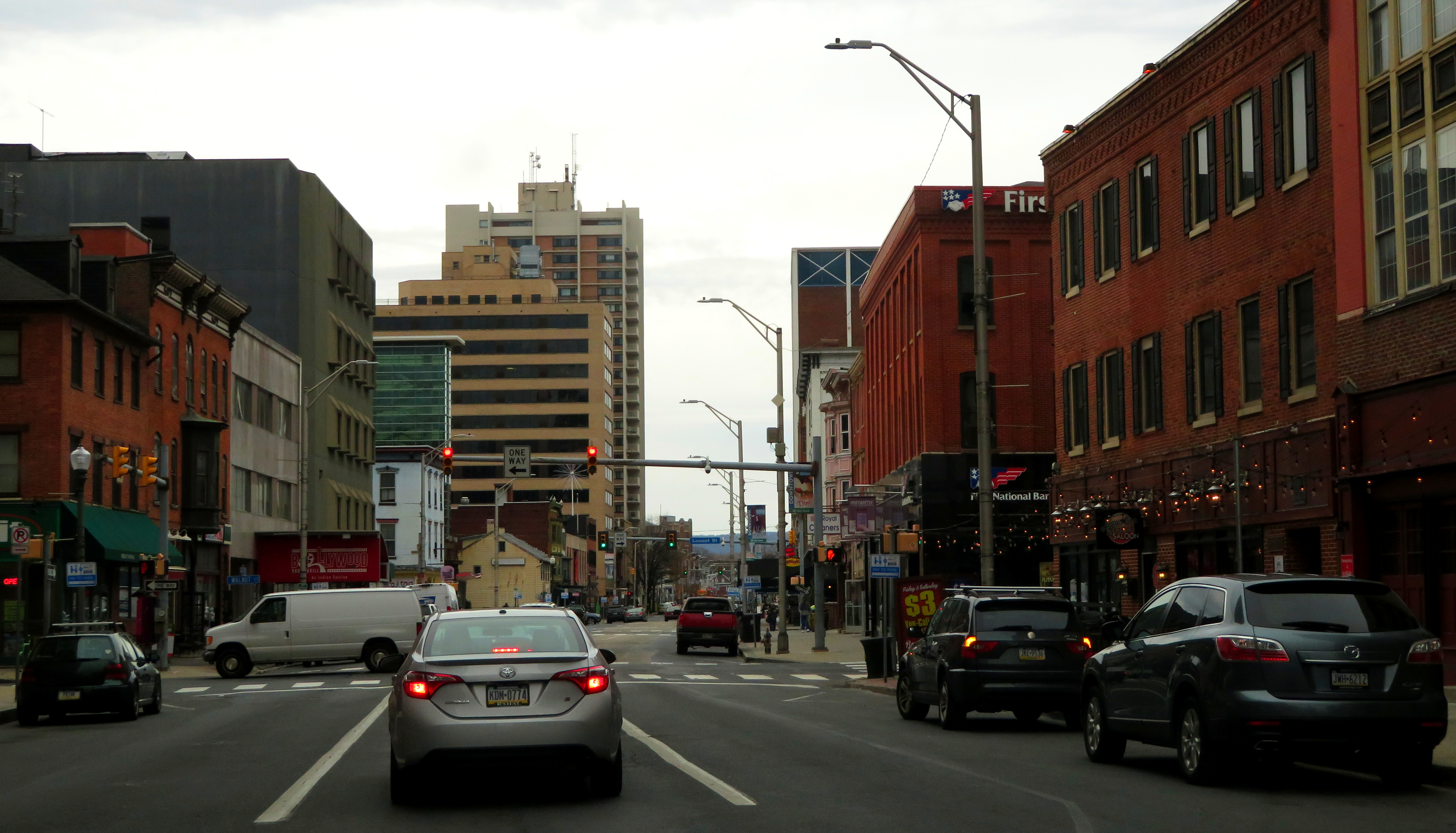
Harrisburg's "Restaurant Row" looking north toward Walnut St, 2019

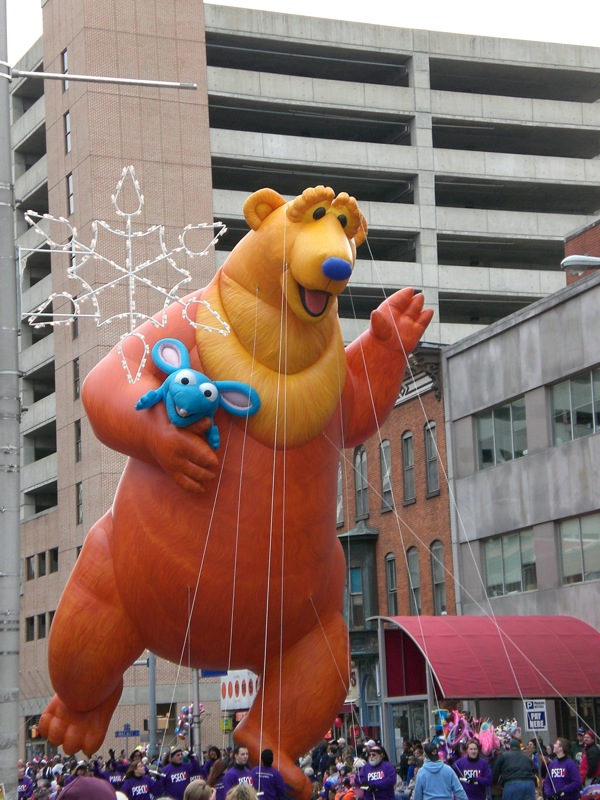
A Bear balloon during a parade down Second Street

North Second Street between Market and Forster is commonly referred to as "Restaurant Row" for its collection and variety of bars, restaurants, and nightlife. Mayor Stephen R. Reed's revival of the area during his tenure is commonly known as being the birth of "Restaurant Row" and it continues to be a large draw for nightlife in the region. It is also home to many events, such as the Ice & Fire Festival, the Saint Patrick's Day Parade, Restaurant Week, Holiday Parade, and "Saturday Nights in the City" outdoor dining, among others. During a typical summer night, the area sees an influx of 4,000 to 5,000 people. Because of such a large weekend draw, the City frequently employs Pennsylvania State Police mounted patrols for extra crowd control on weekend nights.

=== Retail ===
A small shopping mall, Strawberry Square, is the most notable commercial development in the downtown area, as well as boutique shops in the SoMa section South of Market on Third.

=== Riverfront Park ===
Major festivals and events take place along Riverfront Park and the Capital Area Greenbelt, as well as on City Island.

== Education ==
- The Harrisburg University of Science and Technology, founded in 2001, is located at the corner of Market and 4th streets.
- Temple University has its Harrisburg Campus in Strawberry Square.
- Messiah College's Harrisburg Institute.
- Capital Area School for the Arts is located within Strawberry Square.
- The Whitaker Center for Science and the Arts on Market street hosts an IMAX theater, children's science museum with traveling exhibits, and gift shop

== See also ==
- Market Square in Harrisburg
- SoMa, Harrisburg, Pennsylvania
- List of Harrisburg neighborhoods
- Harrisburg Transportation Center
