= Jessie Vann =

African-American teacher and newspaper publisher

- Born: Jessie E. Matthews; February 23, 1885; Floradale, Pennsylvania
- Died: June 7, 1967 (aged 82); Pittsburgh, Pennsylvania
- Occupations: Owner and publisher of the Pittsburgh Courier, an African-American newspaper

Jessie Vann (née Matthews, February 23, 1885; died June 7, 1967) was an African-American teacher and newspaper publisher. From 1940 to 1963 she was owner and publisher of the Pittsburgh Courier, a leading weekly African-American newspaper.

== Early life and family ==
Vann was born Jessie (Note: Some sources give her first name as Jesse.) Ellen Matthews in Floradale, Pennsylvania on February 23, 1885. After moving to Harrisburg, Pennsylvania, she was a top student at Harrisburg's Central High School and was the only African-American graduate in 1904. Following this, she became a prominent school teacher. In 1908 she met Robert Lee Vann, when he was a law student and she a kindergarten teacher. They married in 1910, and shortly thereafter he went into journalism, launching the Pittsburgh Courier.

== Career ==
When Robert died in 1940, Jessie Vann inherited the Courier and served as publisher for the next 23 years. Her success at the paper made her one of the wealthiest African-American women of the World War II era, with the paper grossing about $2 million a year by 1945. Under Vann's direction, the Courier circulated information about the economic opportunities newly available to African-Americans during the war; later, the paper advocated for the work of the civil rights movement.

Vann also served on a large number of civic boards, including the Pittsburgh chapters of the NAACP and the Urban League, the Newspaper Publishers Association, and the Pennsylvania governor's Committee on Industrial Race Relations, and President Dwight Eisenhower’s International Development Advisory Board. In 1956 and 1960, she was an alternate delegate-at-large to the Republican National Convention. The Haitian government awarded her the Haitian Legion of Merit and Honor, accompanied by medal and scroll.

As the wartime economic boom ebbed, the paper also declined financially and board members blamed Vann's management. She retired in 1963, though improving on her leadership proved difficult and the board sold the paper to the Chicago Defender in 1965.

== Death ==
Vann died June 7, 1967, in West Penn Hospital. She was 82. She was survived by foster daughter Mabel Johnson.
