= Harrisburg University of Science and Technology =

Private university in Pennsylvania, United States

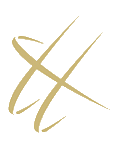
- Logo of Harrisburg University
- Former name: Harrisburg Polytechnic Institute (2001–2003)
- Type: Private university
- Established: 2001
- Endowment: $1 million
- President: David A. Schankweiler
- Vice-president: John Champoil (Enrollment), Lorelee Isbell (External Affairs and Strategic Growth), John Friend (Admissions & Secondary Schools)
- Provost: Kevin M. Purcell, Ph.D.
- Faculty: 200 full-time employees
- Students: 6,500
- Location: Harrisburg, Pennsylvania, United States; 40.2619°N 76.8802°W
- Campus: Urban
- Colors: Pennsylvania Green, Capital Green, Teal, Blue Velvet, Susquehanna Blue
- Nickname: The Storm
- Sporting affiliations: Esports
- Website: harrisburgu.edu
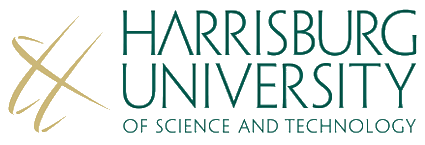

Harrisburg University of Science & Technology, commonly referred to as Harrisburg University (HU), is a private STEM-focused university in Harrisburg, Pennsylvania, with an additional location in Philadelphia. Founded in 2001 as Harrisburg Polytechnic Institute, it offers STEM-focused degree and certificate programs.

Harrisburg University places special emphasis on education in fields related to engineering, applied science and technology and offers 15 bachelor's degrees, 13 master's degrees, and 3 doctoral degrees and certificate programs. The university is accredited by the Middle States Commission on Higher Education.

== History ==
The university was started as Harrisburg Polytechnic Institute to address the Harrisburg, Pennsylvania, region's need for educational opportunities in science, technology, engineering, and math careers. Before creation of Harrisburg University of Science and Technology, Harrisburg was the largest state capital in the country without a four-year university. The institute received $12 million in state capital funding in 2003 for the construction and related services of the institute from then Pennsylvania Governor Ed Rendell. The YWCA building at 215 Market Street was the first home for the university. In the same year the university changed its name to Harrisburg University of Science and Technology.

Harrisburg University has many research centers, including the Center for Advanced Entertainment and Learning Technologies, the Security Center of Excellence, the Government Technology Institute, the Center for Advanced Agriculture and Sustainability, and the Center for Innovation and Entrepreneurship.

In 2023, the university downsized employees due to a budget shortfall. In May 2024, the university missed a bond payment, signifying a cash flow crunch. A second round of layoffs took place in June 2024. In July 2024, the university closed its locations in Dubai and Panama.

In May 2020, a team of two Harrisburg University professors and a Ph.D. student announced they had developed computer facial recognition software capable of predicting whether someone is likely to be a criminal based solely on a photo of their face, and "with no racial bias", a claim found dubious by critics. The announcement was criticized as being "21st-century phrenology" and going "way further than the pseudoscience of physiognomy." The university later deleted the press release at the request of the researchers involved, noting that they are "updating the paper to address concerns raised."

Four years later, Harrisburg University leaders announced that the university had been designated by the National Security Agency (NSA) as a Center of Academic Excellence in Cyber Defense (CAE-CD). According to a university press release, “schools seeking to become NSA-approved CAE institutions undergo an extensive program validation process; prove relevant courses map to NSA requirements, objectives, and priorities; and meet high academic standards.” Harrisburg University's Master of Science in Computer Information Sciences served as the NSA’s validated program of study. The university also offers a Bachelor of Science and Master of Science in Cybersecurity Operations & Control Management.

== Campus ==
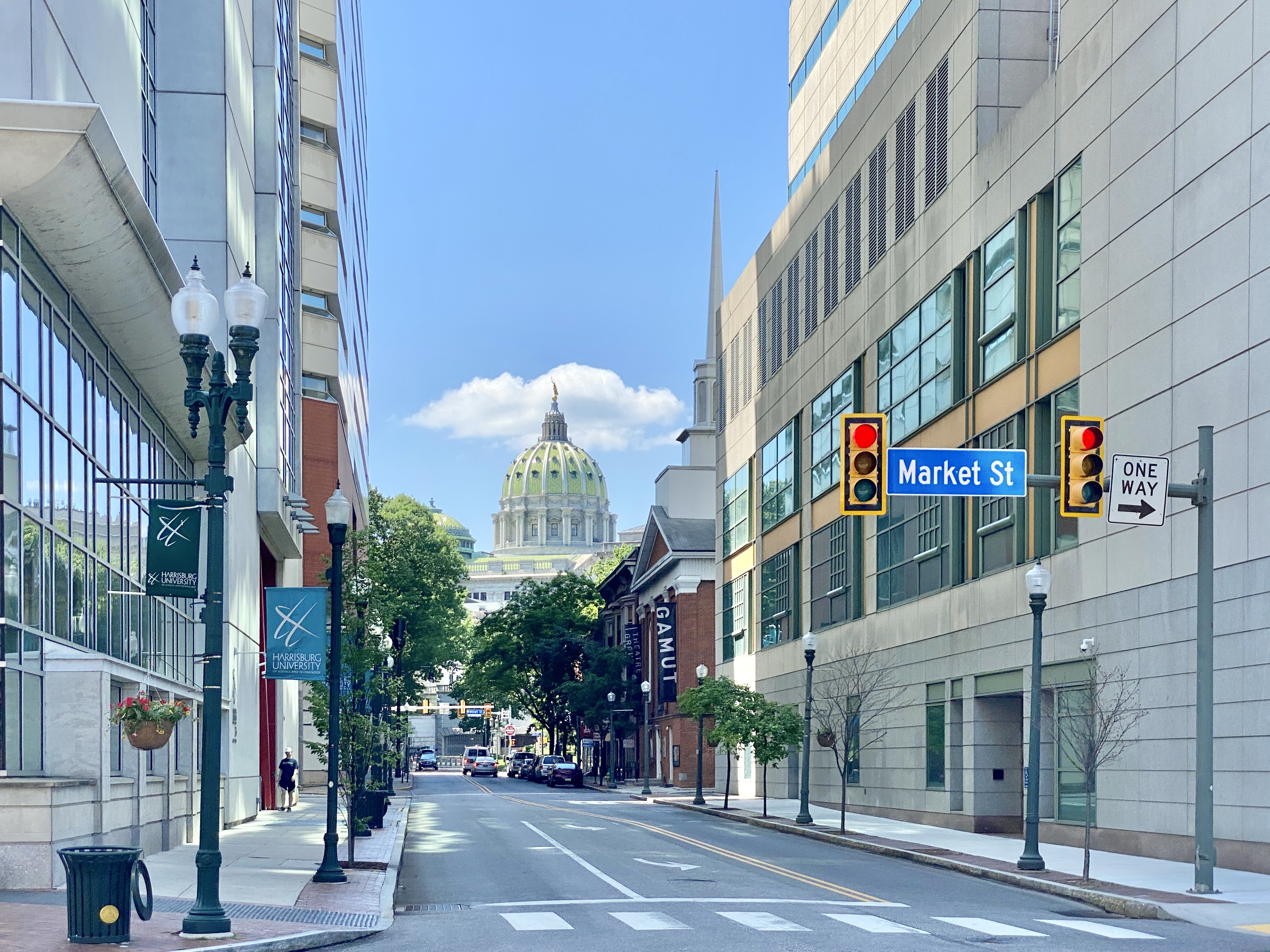
The Pennsylvania State Capitol as seen from Harrisburg University campus

The university's 371,000-square-foot Academic Center is a 16-story building in downtown Harrisburg, 326 Market St. The building includes classrooms, science labs, meeting areas, seminar rooms, a 125-seat auditorium and a courtyard. The academic center has wireless internet, video conferencing and a multi-media production facility. It also has seven levels of parking between the ground floor and the academic floors.

In 2017, the university opened a satellite location in Philadelphia. The Philadelphia location offers bachelor's degree programs in Computer and Information Science, Esports Management, Information Systems and Information Technologies, Management and Entrepreneurship, and Interactive Media and also master's courses in Techpreneurship.

In 2022, the university opened a location in the City of Knowledge in Panama. Additionally, the university constructed a $100-million Science Education Center at 3rd and Chestnut in Harrisburg. The 12-story UPMC Health Sciences Tower was dedicated on September 13, 2023.

== Academics ==
Harrisburg University has 15 undergraduate, 13 master's and three doctoral programs in science and technology-related disciplines. The university follows a trimester system. Programs are offered at the academic center located on the main campus in downtown Harrisburg. Some programs are also offered at the Harrisburg University location in Philadelphia, while others are offered only online. The Philadelphia location offers bachelor's courses in Computer and Information Science, Esports Management, Information Systems and Information Technologies, Management and Entrepreneurship, and Interactive Media; and master's courses in Techpreneurship. The university offers online degree programs, including an RN-to-BSN.

=== Accreditations ===
Harrisburg University of Science and Technology is accredited by the Middle States Commission on Higher Education since 2009. All Bachelors, Masters and Doctoral (Research) degrees are accredited. In 2014, the commission placed the university on probation for failing to comply with its standards. In March, 2016, the commission determined that the school was in compliance and reaffirmed accreditation until 2021. In 2022, the university accreditation was re-affirmed through 2029.

The university is also approved by the Pennsylvania Department of Education Bureau of Postsecondary and Adult Education. The MS in Project Management is accredited by the Global Accreditation Center from the Project Management Institute. The B.S. in Computer and Information Science program is accredited by ABET. The RN-BSN and MS in Nursing programs are accredited by the Commission on Collegiate Nursing Education (CCNE).

=== Rankings ===
In its 2020 rankings, U.S. News & World Report ranked the university in the range #129-#170 in Regional Universities North and tied for #21 in the Most Innovative Schools list. In the 2025 rankings, U.S. News & World Report ranked the university #16 Most Innovative School in the "Regional Universities North" category.

=== Professional education ===
The university offers many professional education programs and centers in partnership with businesses and local government.

- Agile Lean Center
- Center for Advanced Entertainment and Learning Technologies
- Center for Innovation and Entrepreneurship
- Geospatial Technology Center
- Government Technology Institute
- Security Center of Excellence
- User Experience Center

== Student life ==
The university's housing is located close to campus in downtown Harrisburg. Housing is offered to undergraduate students and consists of the Residences on Market and Market View Place. The university is located near the Whitaker Center for Science and the Arts, and the State Museum of Pennsylvania. The university is also a half block from the state capitol of Pennsylvania, and a brief walk to the Riverfront Park along the Susquehanna River. Fitness and dining facilities are leveraged by Strawberry Square. In 2017, the university opened a satellite location in Philadelphia.

The university fields an esports varsity team that has won two national championships.

== Notable alumni ==
- Timothy DeFoor, auditor general of Pennsylvania
