= Penn National Insurance =

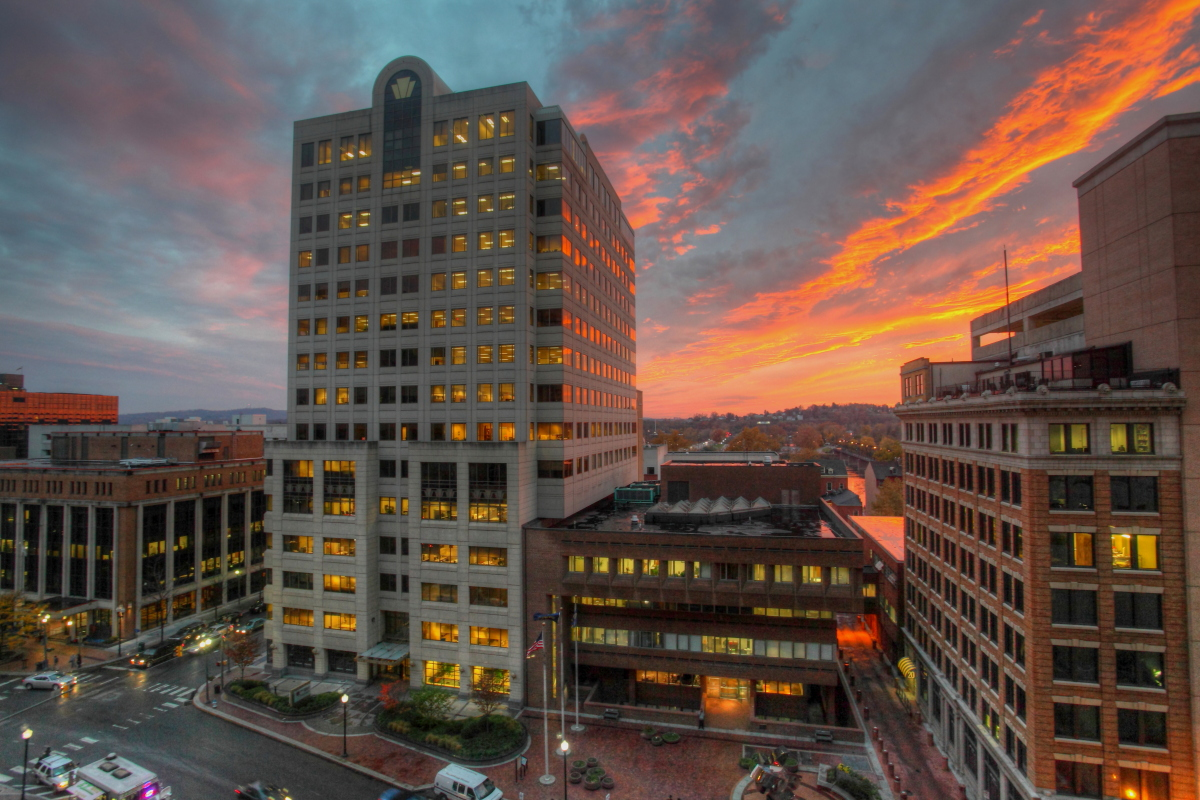
- Penn National Insurance Building (left) in Market Square, Harrisburg
- Industry: Insurance
- Founded: 1919
- Headquarters: 2 N 2nd St, Harrisburg, Pennsylvania
- Key people: Bob Brandon (President, CEO)
- Net income: $36.4 million (2018)
- Number of employees: 820 (2018)
- Website: pennnationalinsurance.com

Penn National Insurance is a property-casualty mutual insurance company, headquartered in Harrisburg, Pennsylvania in the Market Square section of Downtown.

== History ==
Founded in 1919 by the Pennsylvania Farmers and Threshermen's Mutual Protective Association, under the name Pennsylvania Threshermen's and Farmer's Mutual Casualty Company, the company first provided only workers' compensation insurance for farm workers who operated steam-driven threshing machines. The company expanded into all lines of property-casualty insurance, and now does business in eleven states (Pennsylvania, New Jersey, Delaware, Maryland, Virginia, North Carolina, South Carolina, Tennessee, and Alabama).

In December 2019, Penn National Insurance announced that Christine Sears will transition from president & CEO to CEO, and executive VP & COO Robert Brandon will assume the post of president. Sears also announced her planned retirement on August 31 from the company. Upon her resignation, Brandon is set to become president & CEO, while Sears remains on the company's board of directors.

== Products ==
Commercial auto insurance; Condo insurance; Renters insurance; and umbrella insurance.
