= Whitaker Foundation =

The Whitaker Foundation was based in Arlington, Virginia and was an organization that primarily supported biomedical engineering education and research, but also supported other forms of medical research. It was founded and funded by U. A. Whitaker in 1975 upon his death with additional support coming from his wife Helen Whitaker upon her death in 1982. The foundation contributed more than $700 million to various universities and medical schools. The foundation decided to spend its financial resources over a finite period, rather than creating an organization that would be around forever, in order to have the maximum impact. The Whitaker Foundation closed on June 30, 2006. The foundation helped create 30 biomedical engineering programs at various universities in the United States and helped finance the construction of 13 buildings, many of them subsequently bearing the name "Whitaker" in some form.

== Whitaker International Fellows and Scholars Program ==
The Whitaker International Fellows and Scholars Program funded more than 400 pre-doctoral research fellows and post-doctoral scholars between 2011 and 2018 to perform biomedical research outside of the United States. The program was managed by the Institute for International Education, who also manages the Fulbright Program. In addition to traditional laboratory research, the Whitaker International Program also funded internships in scientific policy and classroom-based educational programs. The last grants were awarded in 2018, however, the program continues to pursue Concluding Initiatives that develop and promote leadership in biomedical engineering, with an international focus.
