= Market Square, Harrisburg, Pennsylvania =

Market Square
- Square in Harrisburg
- {{{other_names}}}
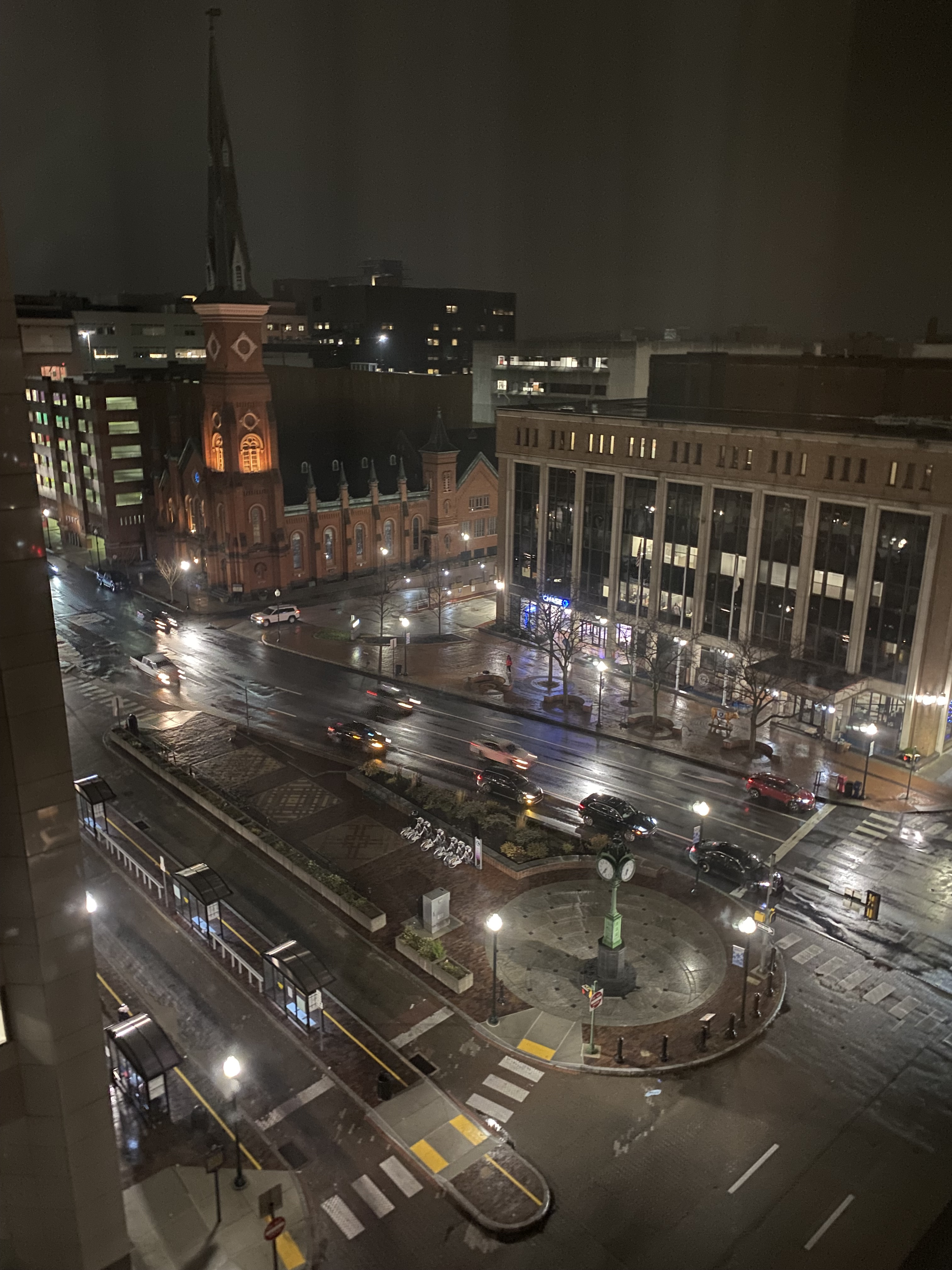
- South half of Market Square, as seen at night
- Location: Harrisburg, Pennsylvania, United States
- Interactive map of Market Square
- Coordinates: 40.259628°N 76.881903°W

Pennsylvania Historical Marker
- Designated: February 25, 1953

Harrisburg's Market Square is located in Downtown Harrisburg at the intersection of 2nd and Market Streets. The square was created in 1785. Since then, it has traditionally been the navigational center of the city, and experienced a post-1980s revival, with the creation of several new commercial, residential and retail spaces.

Market Square serves as a hub for Capital Area Transit (CAT) buses. It is located one block from Riverfront Park and the Market Street Bridge, which crosses over the Susquehanna River.

== History ==
John Harris, Jr. the founder of Harrisburg had his son-in-law, William Maclay, draw up a plan for the town in 1785. It allowed for 207 quarter-acre building lots aligned along streets set to a standard width of fifty-two feet six inches (16.00 m). Market Street, envisioned as the grand avenue of the new town, was planned at eighty feet wide. Where it intersected with Second Street, Maclay planned in ample setbacks to allow for a “Market Square,” which has remained a prominent feature of Harrisburg to this present day.

At this time, two market "sheds" laid in the center of Market Square for residents to buy food. Though Wednesdays and Saturdays were the two main market days, the market was open daily for other perishables. As it was normal to come centrally to the market for food, it also grew to become the natural site for civic events.

President George Washington spoke to a crowd here regarding the Whiskey Rebellion on October 4, 1794. On February 22, 1861 Abraham Lincoln addressed a crowd from his hotel in Market Square. Thousands gathered to hear John F. Kennedy campaign for President at Market Square on October 24, 1960. Revolutionary War hero the Marquis De Lafayette, Daniel Webster and General Ulysses S. Grant also have spoken at Market Square.

Since the 1980s, open concerts performed by professional artists have taken place at the square, and it is the location for the "drop" at the City's New Years Eve celebration.

== Gallery ==
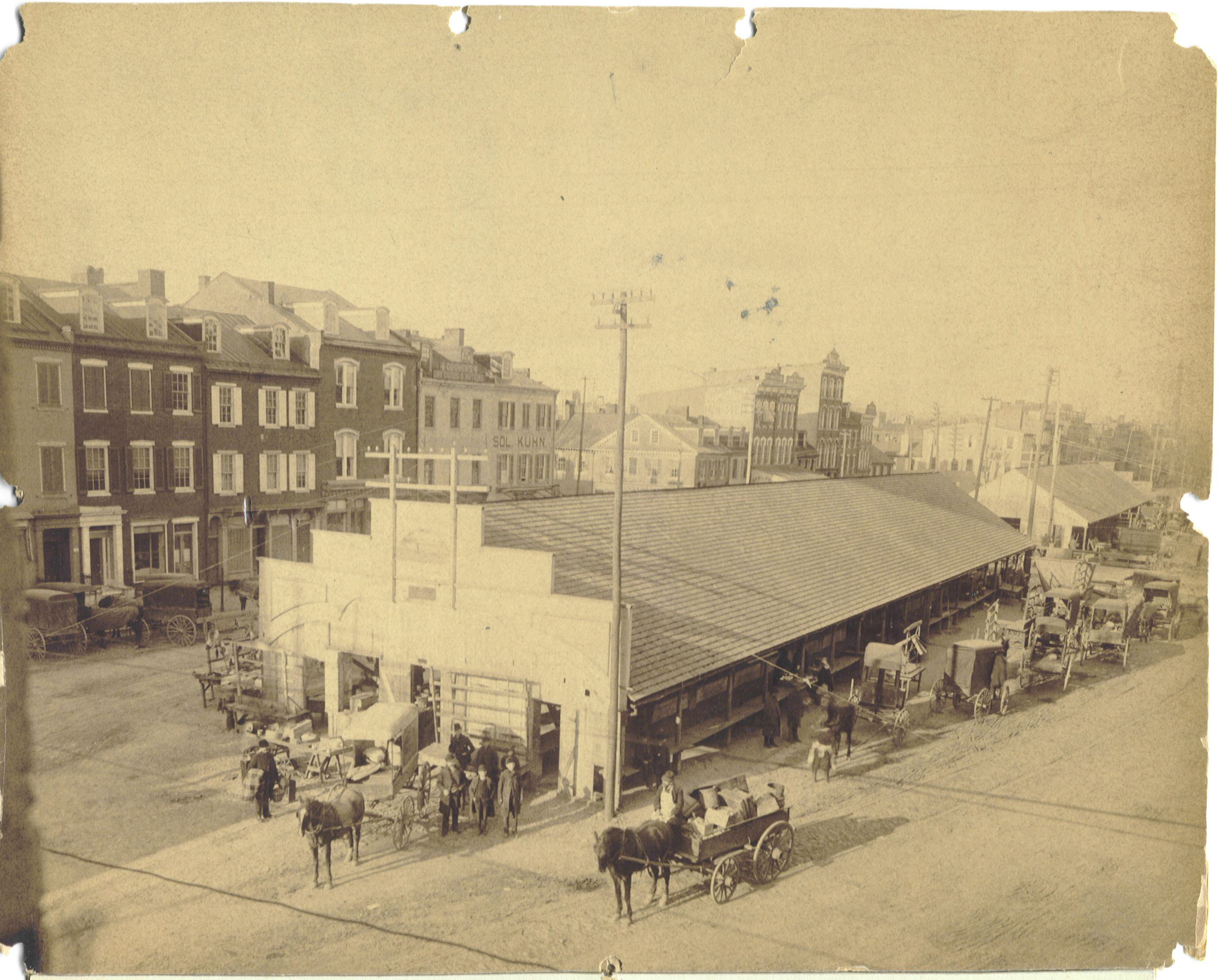
Market Square looking north, c. 1890

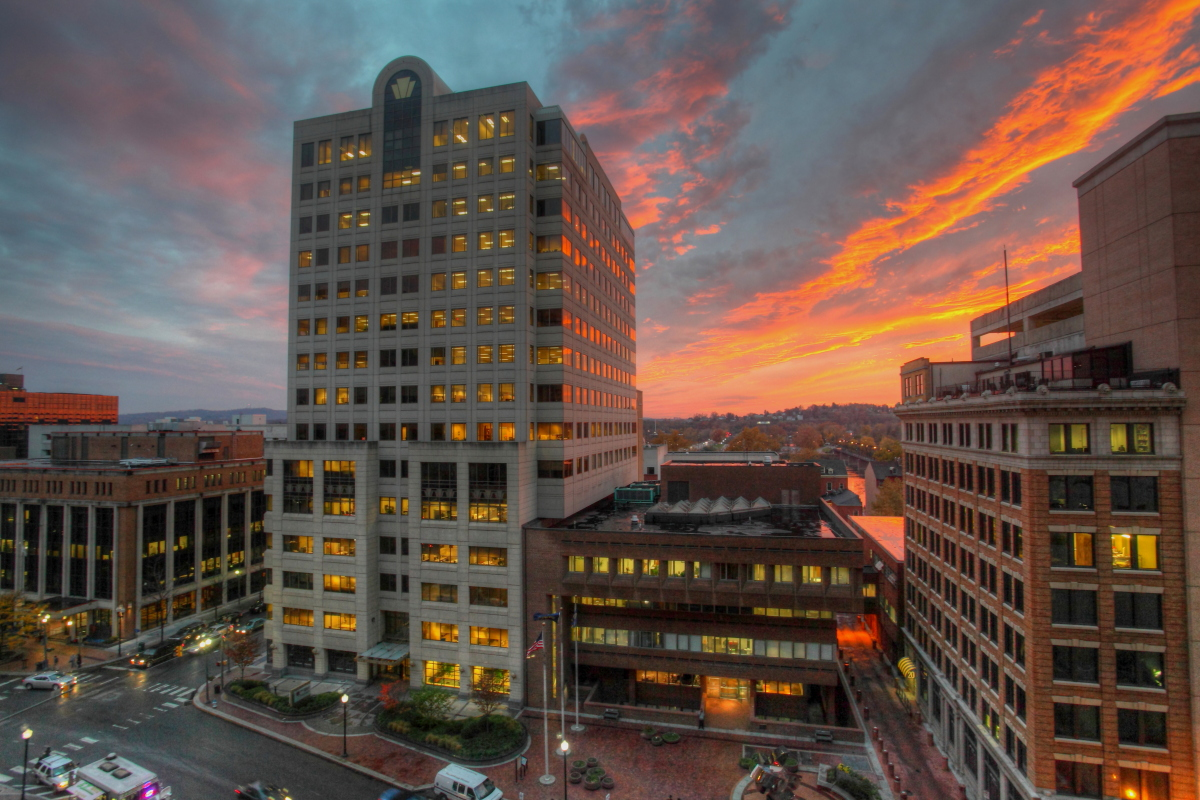
Market Square, Penn National Insurance Building (left), Rev. Dr. Martin Luther King Jr. City Government Center (right)

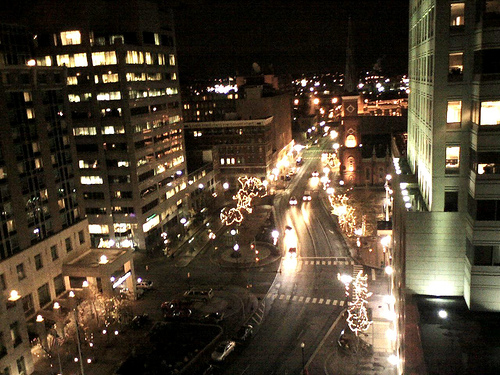

== See also ==
- Market Square in Pittsburgh
- List of city squares
