= Mary Molson =

African-American suffragist

Mary D. (Maud) Molson Hughes (September 26, 1846 – August 26, 1881) was a suffragist, lecturer, and orator. She was a member of the National Woman Suffrage Association (NWSA) and delivered speeches across the country, advocating for the equal rights of African-American men and women to vote.

== Early life ==
Mary D. Molson was born in Williamsport, Pennsylvania, on September 26, 1846, to parents John and Louisa Clark Molson. She was the third of six children; her siblings included James S., Ellen R., John, Samuel J., Josey, and Charles Summer Molson.

== Career ==
Molson was a lecturer, orator, and African-American suffragist, advocating that Black women have as much right to vote as Black men.

After leaving Alfred University, she "lectured around western New York in the spring of 1869 with Charles Lenox Remond, a well-known Massachusetts abolitionist, in support of the Fifteenth Amendment."

In 1869, she spoke at the Colored Men's Convention in Binghamton, New York, participated in the jubilee procession of emancipation through the Eighth Ward, and she spoke at Wesley Union A.M.E. Zion Church. The Harrisburg Telegraph described the evening of September 14:

She was introduced to the audience by Prof. O. L. C. Hughes, editor of the Progress of Liberty, who, in introducing her, said he did not endorse her views on female suffrage. Miss Molson delivered her lecture in a very pleasing manner, and her subject was handled in such a manner as to evince great care in its preparation. She is outspoken in favor of suffrage for all, and especially for fe- males, who, she thinks, have as great a claim to vote as the men have. She met the objections that are usually advanced against female suf- frage, and handled the ‘lords of creation’ without gloves. Her style of delivery is similar to that of Anna Dickinson, and her elocution, if anything, is more perfect.

== Personal life ==
Mary Molson lived in Addison, New York, until she was 18 years old.

Molson attended Alfred University (1862-1863) and graduated with highest honors.

She married Orra L. C. Hughes, and they had a daughter, Lulu Missouri (Hughes) Brown, in 1870.

== Death ==
Molson died at the age of 35, on August 26, 1881, due to "inflammatory rheumatism" and an accompanying bacterial infection known as "pyanemia," and she is buried at Collins Center Cemetery, Collins Center, Cattaraugus County, New York.
