= Agnes Kemp =

American physician

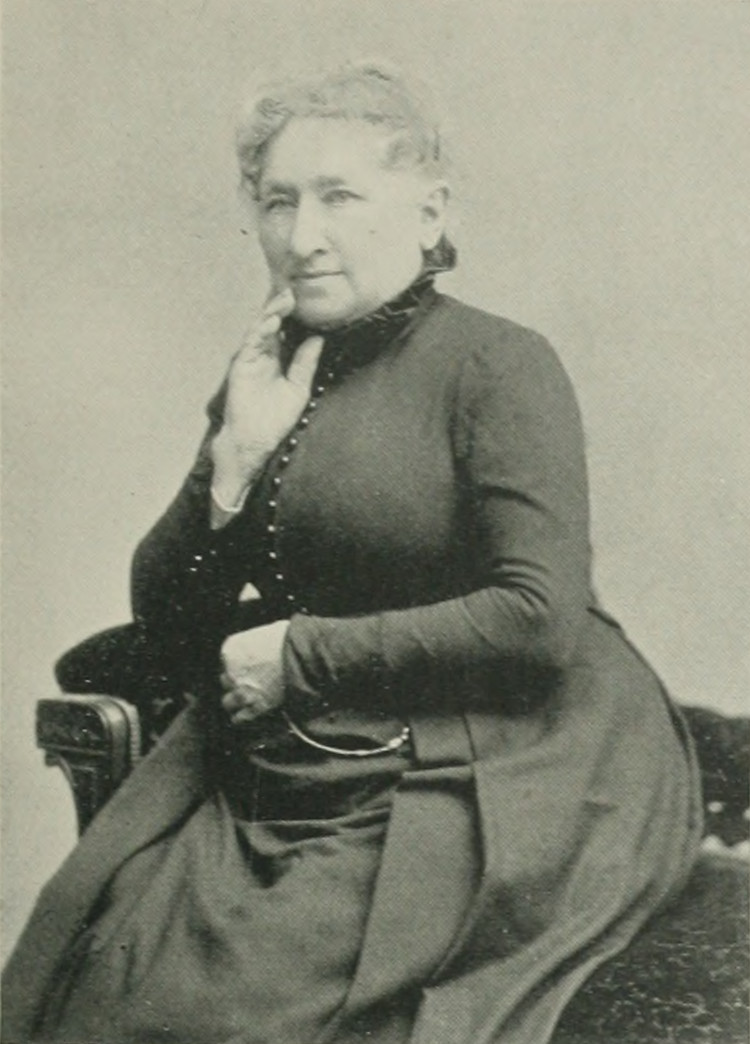
Agnes Kemp ca. 1893.

Agnes Nininger Saunders Kemp (November 4, 1823 – 1908) was a 19th-century American physician who was a national leader in the temperance movement as well as the first woman to practice medicine in Harrisburg, Pennsylvania.

== Family and education ==
She was born Agnes Ninninger in Harrisburg, Pennsylvania, the daughter of Antoine 'Anthony' Ninninger (1787–1866), from Alsace, France, who had emigrated to America in 1816, and Catharine (May) Ninninger (1800–1833), who was of Pennsylvania Dutch (Swiss-German) descent. Her mother died when Agnes was nine.

She first married William Saunders, an army colonel, but was widowed after a few years. In 1857 she married Joseph Kemp (d. 1875) of Hollidaysburg; they had one surviving daughter, Marie Antoinette, who became a professor of German at Swarthmore College.

== Career ==
Early in her first marriage, she had health issues that resulted in a trip to New York state for treatment, where she met and was inspired by the social reformers Lucretia Mott, William Lloyd Garrison, Abby Kelly Foster, and Ralph Waldo Emerson.

On her return to Harrisburg, she began to advocate for temperance reform and was instrumental in establishing a chapter of the Women's Christian Temperance Union. She also advocated for prison reform and public education for children, among other issues. By her mid-forties she was recognized nationally as a reform leader, and Lucy Stone, Julia Ward Howe, and Lucretia Mott were among the influential speakers who came to Harrisburg at her invitation.

Kemp was convinced that ignorance of hygiene was at the root of many women's illnesses and determined to study medicine. She entered the Woman's Medical College in Philadelphia, and when she graduated in 1879 she was, at 56, the oldest member of her class. She set up practice in Harrisburg, becoming the first woman in Dauphin County to practice medicine as well as the first (in 1880) to be invited into the county medical society. She continued to advocate for temperance reform both in the United States and during several extended visits to France.

She retired in 1903 and went to live with her daughter, who died in 1907. Kemp then helped to raise her grandson until she died the following year. She is buried in Harrisburg Cemetery.
