= Pennsylvania State Capitol Complex =

Buildings in Harrisburg, Pennsylvania

- U.S. National Register of Historic Places
- U.S. National Historic Landmark District
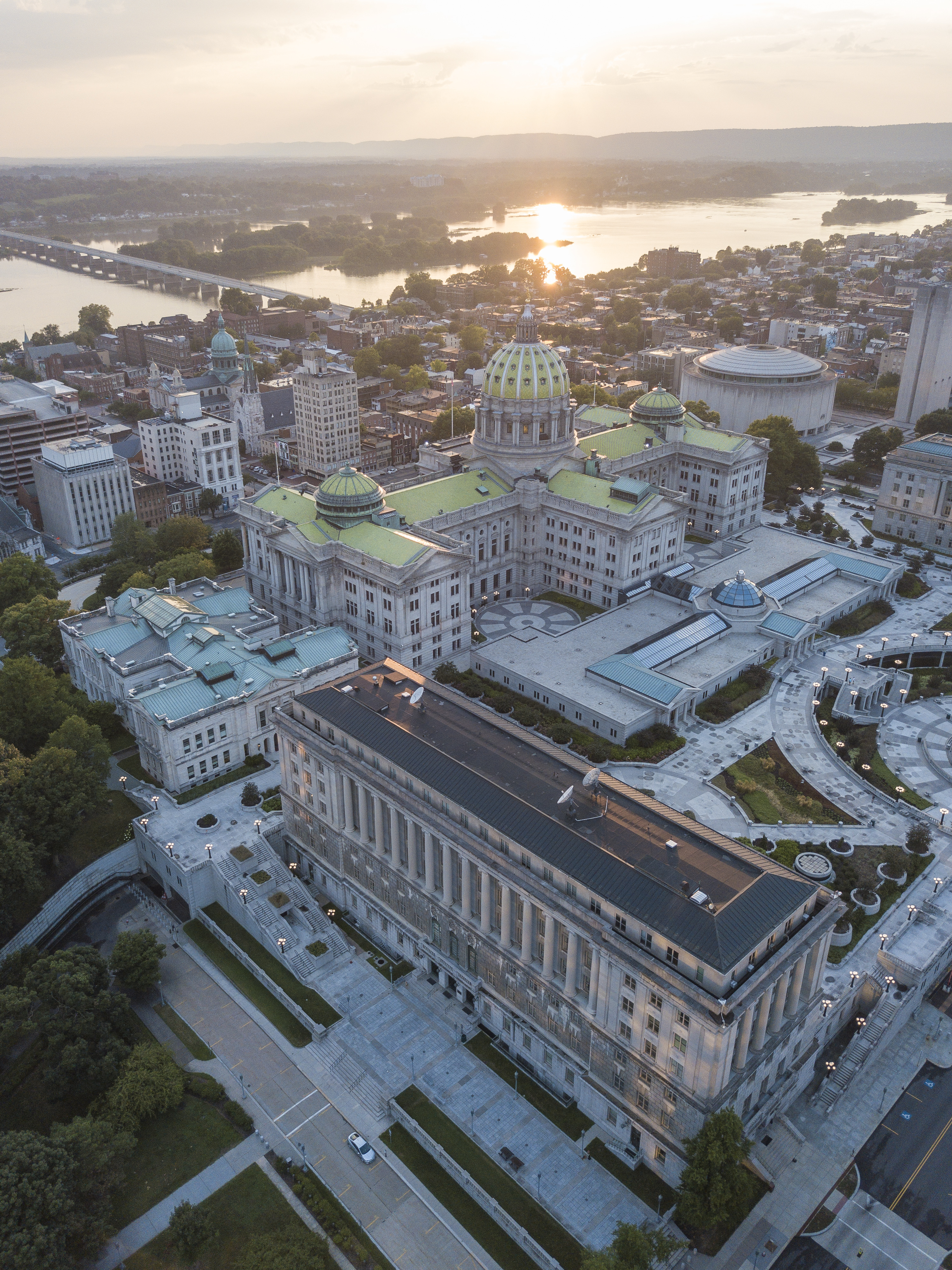
- (Pictured July 28th, 2019) East portal of the Pennsylvania State Capitol at sunset with Speaker K. Leroy Irvis Office Building in front

- Location within Pennsylvania Location within the United States
- Location: Third, Walnut, Seventh and North Sts., Harrisburg, Pennsylvania, U.S.
- Coordinates: 40°15′54″N 76°52′56″W
- Area: 48 acres (19 ha)
- Built: 1902
- Architect: Brunner, Arnold; Huston, Joseph M.
- Architectural style: Renaissance, Italian Renaissance
- NRHP reference No.: 77001162 (original); 13000287 (increase)

Significant dates
- Added to NRHP: September 14, 1977
- Boundary increase: February 27, 2013
- Designated NHLD: September 20, 2006

The Pennsylvania State Capitol Complex is a large complex of state government buildings in Harrisburg, Pennsylvania, United States. Set on more than 50 acres (20 ha) of downtown Harrisburg, it includes the Pennsylvania State Capitol and a landscaped park environment with monuments, memorials, and other government buildings. It is bounded on the north by Forster Street, the east by North 7th Street, the south by Walnut Street, and the west by North 3rd Street. Most of this area (bounded on the north by North Street) is a National Historic Landmark District, recognized in 2013 as a fully realized example of the City Beautiful movement landscape and planning design of Arnold Brunner.

== Description ==
The Pennsylvania State Capitol Complex is located in central downtown Harrisburg, four blocks east of the Susquehanna River. Its centerpiece is the Pennsylvania State Capitol, constructed in 1902 - 1906 to a design by Joseph Miller Huston. The capitol is a nationally recognized example of Beaux Arts architecture, and is known for its interior opulence and artwork. On the east side of the capitol is the East Wing, a 1987 extension that greatly expands the building's capacity without detracting from the surrounding landscape. Flanking the East Wing to the north and south are the North and South Office Buildings, begun in 1927 and 1919 respectively; they are similarly scaled and both built of Indiana limestone in the Classical Revival style, but have slightly different styling. South of the Capitol is the Ryan Office Building, the oldest building (completed 1894) of the complex. Between the two buildings a semicircular walkway provides access to them as well as the East Wing entrance to the Capitol, with a fountain in the center.

Across Commonwealth Avenue east of the North and South Office Buildings, a pair of buildings extend the line of the North and South Buildings, with the Soldiers' and Sailors' Memorial Grove, a park setting with many memorials and monuments in between. On the south side of the grove is the Forum, and the Finance Building is to the north. Both continue the use of Indiana limestone and Classical Revival styling. The easternmost portion of the complex is the Soldiers' and Sailor's Bridge, which connects the complex to neighborhoods across the railroad tracks that run east of North 7th Street.

The complex has been extended across North Street to include the Modernist State Museum of Pennsylvania building and the adjacent Department of Transportation building.

The complex and greater area is protected full-time by the Pennsylvania Capitol Police—its dedicated law enforcement agency—as well as the Harrisburg Bureau of Police, which patrols the entire city.

=== Monuments ===
A Gathering at the Crossroads is a monument on the southern end of the complex near the corner of North Fourth Street and Walnut Street. It commemorates the 100 and 150-year anniversaries of the passing of the Fifteenth Amendment and Nineteenth Amendment.

== Buildings ==
Building	Image	Address	Height	Floors	Built	Notes
Pennsylvania State Capitol		501 North 3rd Street; 40°15′52″N 76°52′0″W	272 feet (83 m)	5	1906	Contains the House of Representatives, Senate, offices for the governor and lieutenant governor, and the Supreme Court's Harrisburg chamber.
Rachel Carson State Office Building		400 Market Street; 40°15′44.6″N 76°52′47.3″W	230 feet (70 m)	17	1990	Named for environmentalist Rachel Carson. Contains the Departments of Conservation and Natural Resources and Environmental Protection.
Labor and Industry Building		651 Boas Street	219 feet (67 m)	18	1955	Contains the Department of Labor and Industry.
Governor's Residence		2035 North Front Street		2 1/2	1968	Official residence of the governor of Pennsylvania
Health and Welfare Building		625 Forster Street	143 feet (44 m)	11	1955	Contains the Departments of Health and Public Welfare.
Matthew Ryan Legislative Office Building		Southwardly adjacent to the Capitol Building.	unknown	2	1893	Named for former Speaker of the Pennsylvania House Matthew J. Ryan. Contains offices for members of the Pennsylvania House of Representatives.
Commonwealth Keystone Building		400 North Street	unknown	10	2001	Houses offices of the Pennsylvania Public Utility Commission, Pennsylvania Department of Transportation and other state agencies. Replaced the 13-story Transportation and Safety Building which was built in 1963 and demolished in 1998 after being heavily damaged in a fire in 1994.
K. Leroy Irvis Office Building		450 Commonwealth Avenue	unknown	7	1921	Named for former Speaker of the Pennsylvania House K. Leroy Irvis
North Office Building		401 North Street	unknown	7	1928	
Northwest Office Building		Capital and Forster Streets	unknown	7	1939	Contains the Pennsylvania Liquor Control Board.
Forum Building		607 South Drive	unknown	6	1931	Contains the State Library
Finance Building		613 North Street	unknown	5	1939	Contains the Pennsylvania Treasury Department whose cylindrical vault was designed by Frederick S. Holmes. In 1987, it was the site of the suicide of R. Budd Dwyer.
Pennsylvania Judicial Center		601 Commonwealth Avenue	unknown	9	2010	Contains the Pennsylvania Commonwealth Court.
Pennsylvania State Archives		350 North Street	unknown	20	1964	
State Museum of Pennsylvania		North 3rd and North Streets	unknown	5	1964	
Strawberry Square		303 Walnut Street	204 feet (62 m)	16	1980	Houses the offices of the State Civil Service Commission as well as the State Department of Revenue
Forum Place		555 Walnut Street	unknown	9	1996	Houses Office of Budget and Social Security
333 Market Street Tower		333 Market Street	341 feet (104 m)	22	1978	Houses the Pennsylvania Department of Education. Tallest building in Harrisburg and the tallest building in Pennsylvania outside of Pittsburgh and Philadelphia.

== History ==
=== Development history ===
Harrisburg's Capitol Hill has been the seat of Pennsylvania state government since 1822, when its first capitol building was dedicated. That structure, much altered over the 19th century. In 1893 work began on what is now the Ryan Office Building. The first capitol burned down in 1897, and its replacement was abandoned in an unfinished state in 1899 after negative public and legislative response to its exterior. The present capitol was begun in 1902 and completed in 1906.

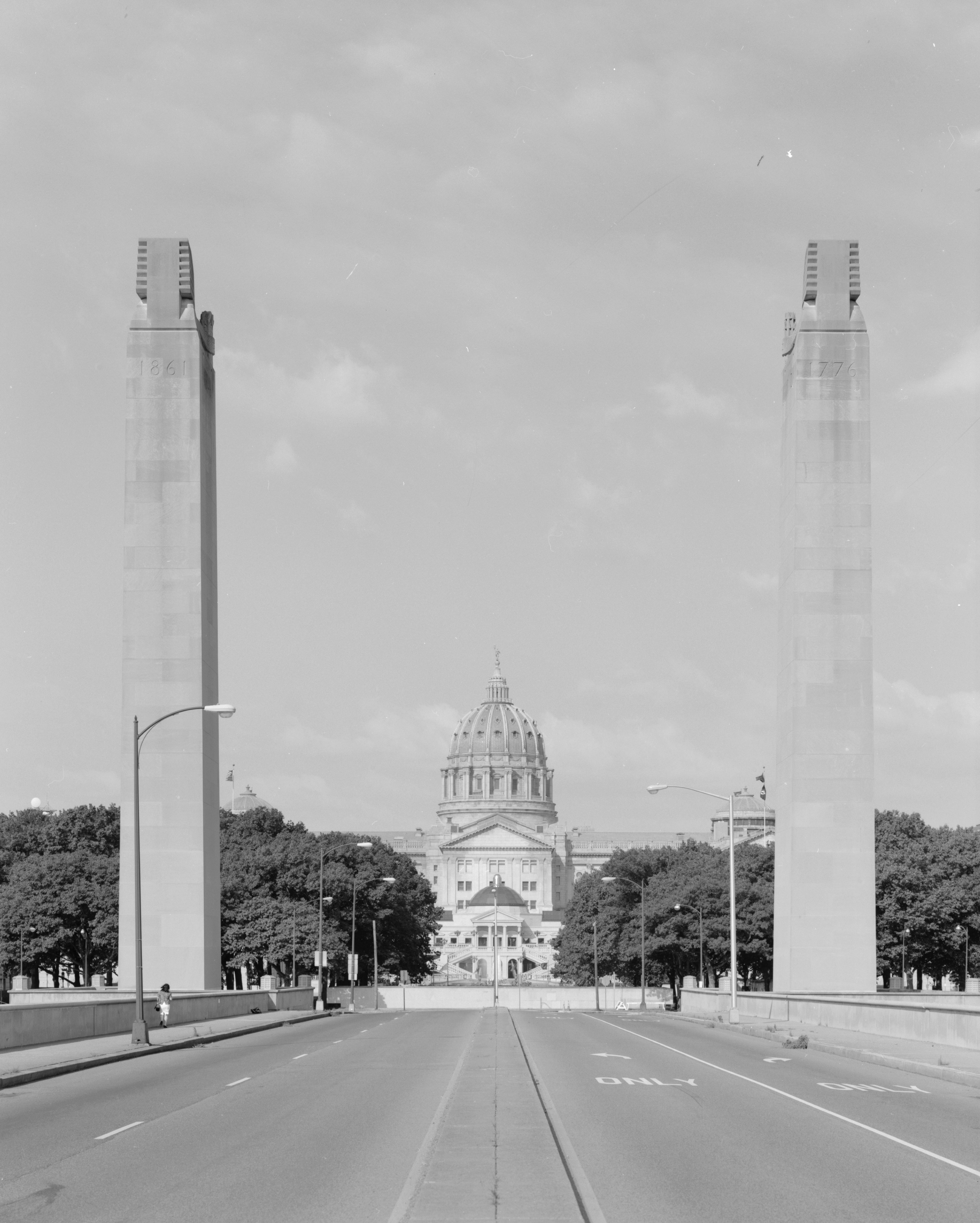
State Street Bridge (HAER photo, 1997)

In the 1910s the state recognized the need for additional space, and acquired the area then known as the Eighth Ward, between Commonwealth Avenue and North 7th Street. Arnold Brunner was selected to develop a master landscaping and design plan for this space, which he did using then-fashionable City Beautiful principles. Although only small portions of his vision were realized in his lifetime (he died in 1925), the resulting landscape is very much in keeping with his original plans. The principal deviation is the area now occupied by the East Wing. Brunner had planned this as a "People's Forecourt", an open space whose landscaping would tie the Capitol and the North and South Buildings together visually. In execution, the area became a parking lot serving the capitol until the East Wing was built, providing a different and more modern type of visual unity.

=== Recent history ===
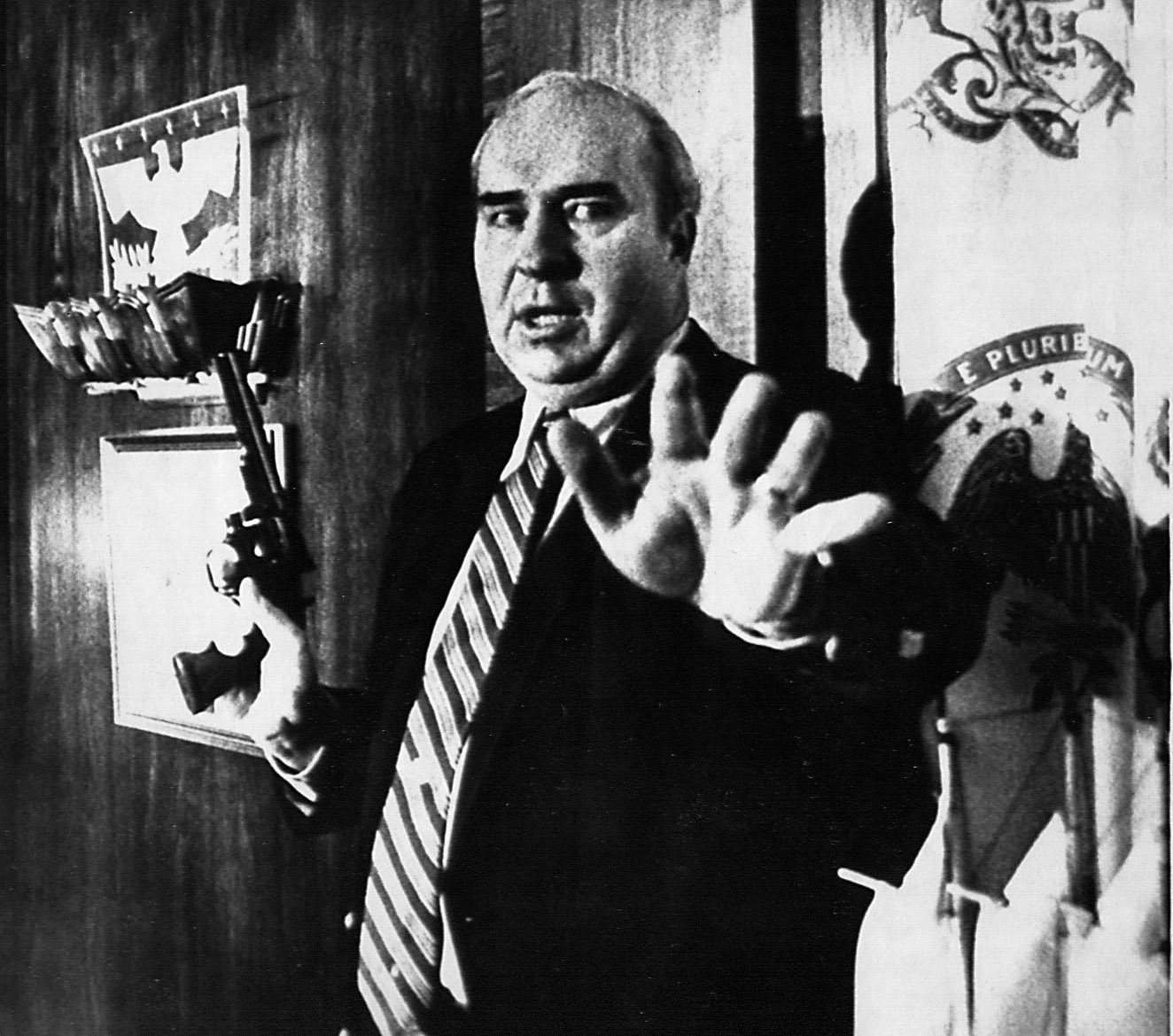
R. Budd Dwyer holding a revolver seconds before shooting himself through the roof of his mouth.

On January 22, 1987, State Treasurer of Pennsylvania R. Budd Dwyer shot and killed himself at a press conference held inside the Pennsylvania Finance Building on the complex a day before he was to be sentenced for accepting a bribe.

The Capitol building was listed on the National Register of Historic Places in 1977, and was designated a National Historic Landmark in 2006. The latter designation was expanded to include the entire area of the complex south of North Street in 2013.

== See also ==
- List of National Historic Landmarks in Pennsylvania
- National Register of Historic Places listings in Dauphin County, Pennsylvania
- List of state and county courthouses in Pennsylvania
