= Strawberry Square =

Coordinates: 40.2613°N 76.8808°W

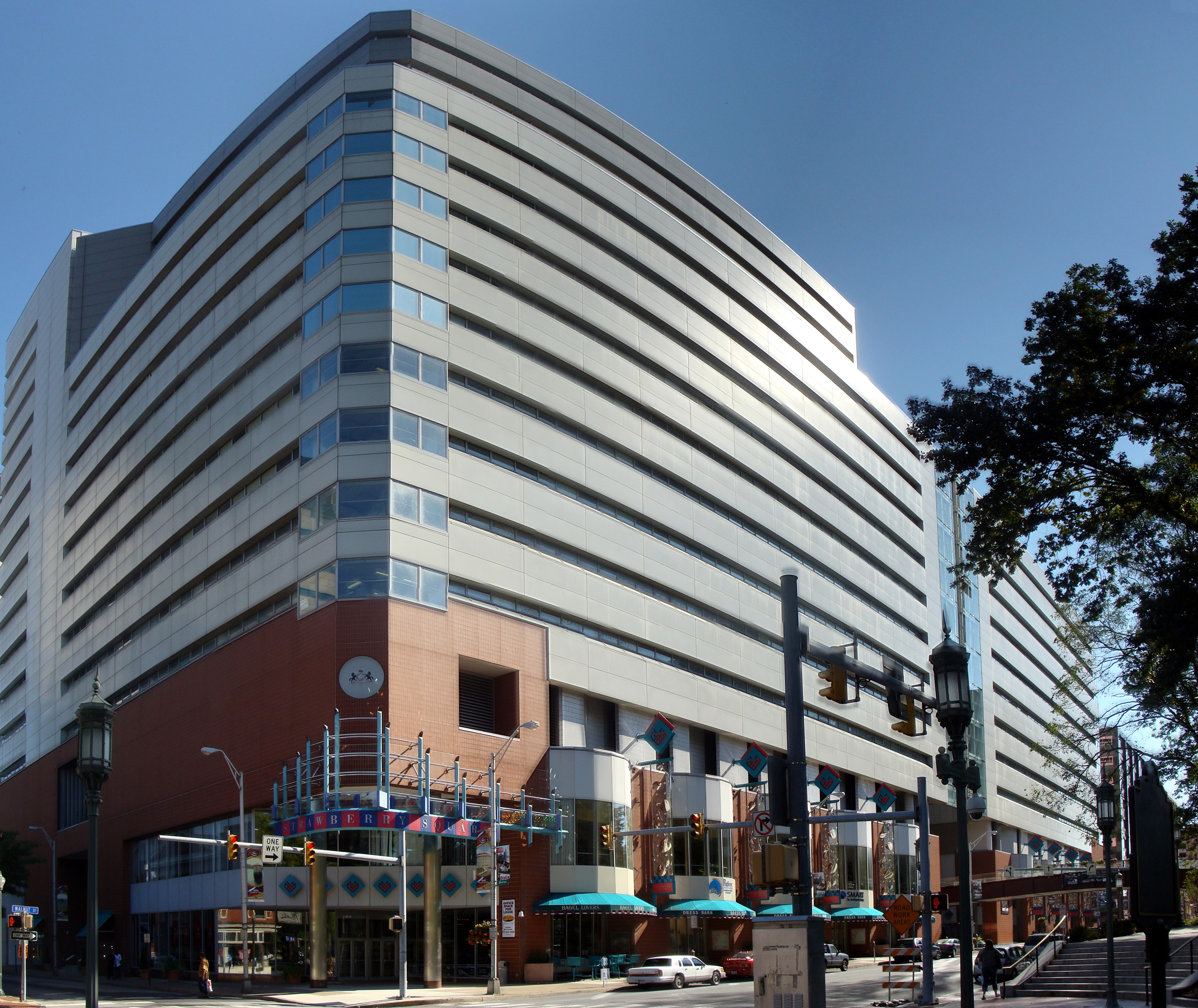
- Strawberry Square as seen looking South from Walnut Street & 4th Street, September 2010
- Location: Harrisburg, Pennsylvania, USA
- Address: 11 N. 3rd Street, Harrisburg, PA 17101
- Opened: 1978
- Owner: Harristown Development Corporation
- Architect: Mitchell/Giurgola and later Lawrie and Green
- Num. of stores: 30+
- Floors: 2 (public area)
- Website: Strawberry Square

Strawberry Square is a mixed-use retail and commercial complex located in downtown Harrisburg, Pennsylvania. It is owned and managed by the Harristown Development Corporation (HDC), a non-profit organization.

== History ==
Strawberry Square is considered a project in the modern urban revitalization of center city Harrisburg. Phase I of this mixed-use facility originally opened in 1978, with 1,400,000 square feet (130,000 m^{2}) of office and retail space overlooking the Capitol following the closing and demolition of the Penn-Harris Hotel in 1973. Eleven years after Phase I, HDC completed the $21 million Phase II expansion. This included the restoration of ten 19th and 20th century buildings that are listed in the National Register of Historic Places and represent the city's oldest remaining retail establishments. The site was named for the alleyway that traverses the complex's east–west axis, which still exists from Front Street to Third Street in downtown Harrisburg. The portion of Strawberry Alley vacated for the Complex is now a commons area beside the second floor escalators. It was also referred to as the 'Key Block' when the complex was first constructed in the 1970s.

Major tenants include Verizon, the Commonwealth of Pennsylvania (including the headquarters of the Pennsylvania Attorney General), Harrisburg University, Temple University Harrisburg, Capital Area School for the Arts, Morgan Stanley Dean Witter, and Salomon Smith Barney, Inc. In addition, Strawberry Square houses an array of service retail, upscale fashion shops, jewelers and other specialty stores. More than 40 shops and galleries along with 10 food emporiums are contained in about 170,000 square feet (16,000 m^{2}) of retail space. Its food court includes a variety of national and international cuisine. From 1988 until 2022, the atrium featured a 41-foot tall audio-kinetic sculpture by George Rhoads entitled the "Chockablock Clock" which was relocated to Shippensburg University to make room for a meeting space.

Due to its high name recognition and centralized location, Strawberry Square's atrium has become, in effect, a Harrisburg town square, hosting hundreds of community, education, and arts groups and events annually. The complex also hosts multiple high-school and college classes.

== Educational institutions ==
- Capital Area School for the Arts
- Harrisburg University of Science and Technology
- Messiah College
- Olewine School of Culinary Arts (Harrisburg Area Community College)
- SciTech High
- Temple University

== See also ==
- 333 Market Street (Harrisburg, Pennsylvania)
