= Whitaker Center for Science and the Arts =

- Whitaker Center logo

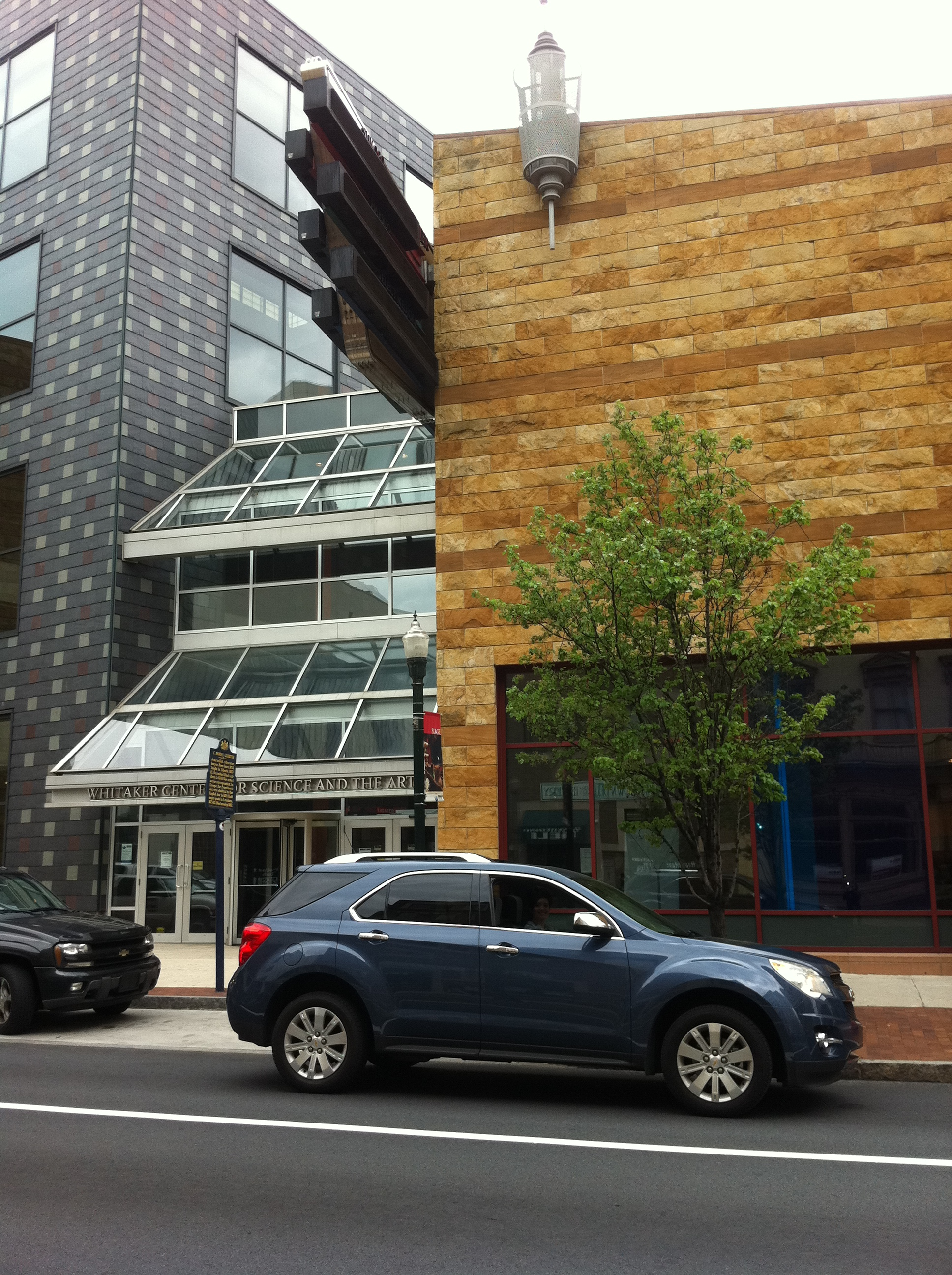
- Whitaker Center as seen from Market Street
- Established: 9 September 1999
- Location: 222 Market Street, Harrisburg, PA 17101
- Coordinates: 40.2604°N 76.8807°W
- Type: Science and Art museum
- Architect: Hugh Hardy
- Public transit access: Capital Area Transit
- Parking: Parking garage & on street
- Website: www.whitakercenter.org

The Whitaker Center for Science and the Arts is located in Harrisburg, Pennsylvania. It present exhibits related to science and the performing arts, and also offers a digital cinema.

In 1999, This education center encompassed a total of 130,000 square feet (12,000 m^{2}), including the three main components, plus STAGE TWO, Discovery Lab classrooms, multi-purpose rooms, the AMP Grand Lobby and the Kunkel Gallery.

== History ==
In September 1997, the Whitaker Center for Science and the Arts was established at the cost of $52.7 million public-private partnership, which The Whitaker Foundation and the Helen F. Whitaker Fund have contributed over $8 million to the establishment of the center.

In recognition of these grants, Whitaker Center for Science and the Arts is named in memory of the founder of AMP Incorporated (now TE Connectivity), Uncas A. Whitaker and his wife Helen F. Whitaker.

The National Science Foundation awarded the center a grant in support of a permanent exhibit for the new Science Center.

== Whitaker Center attractions ==
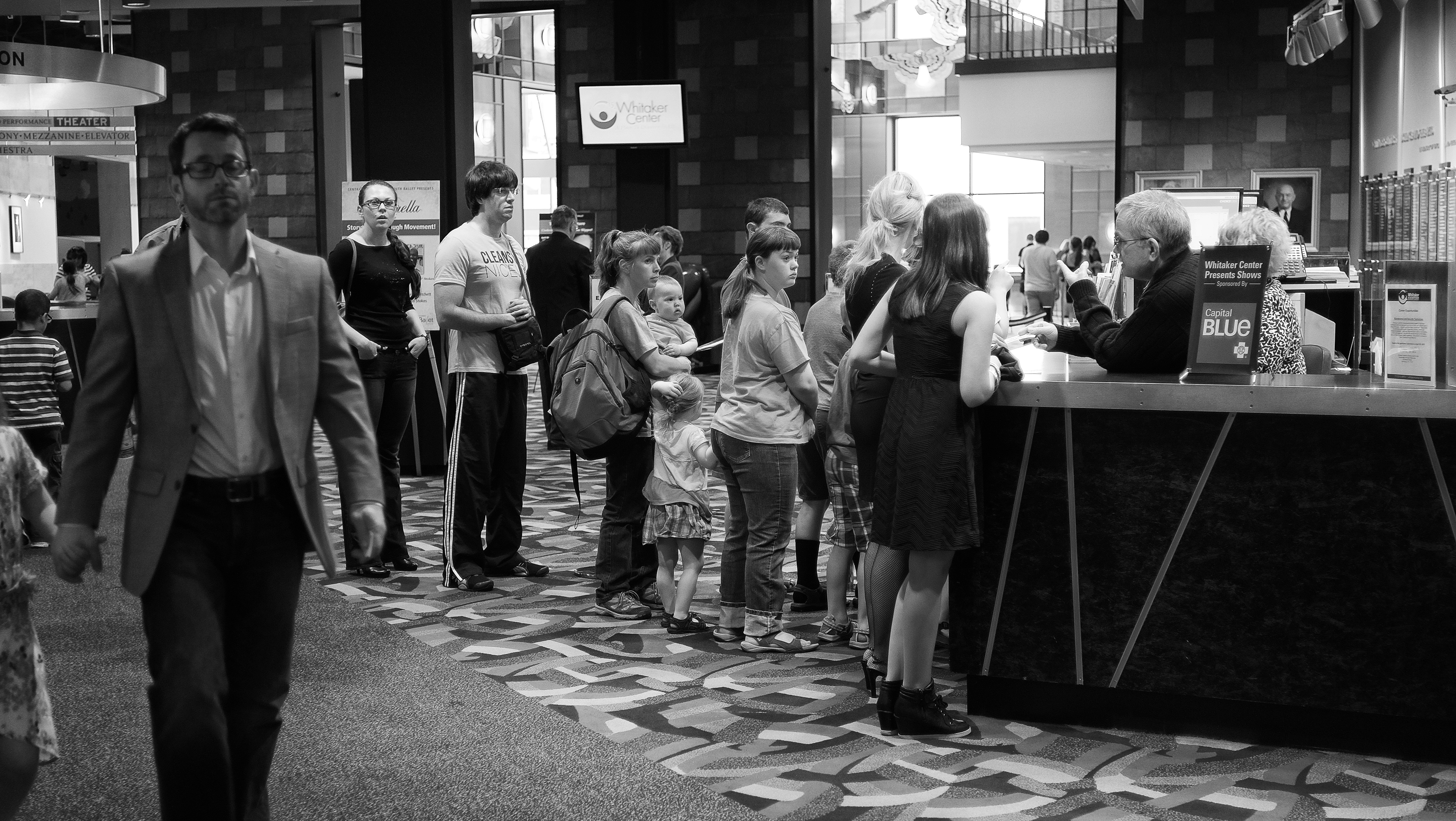
Whitaker Center patrons in line

Select Medical Digital Cinema (formerly Select Medical IMAX Theater) is a large-format cinema arts theater which primarily focuses on educational films. It was an IMAX theater until 2014, when it was upgraded to a more cost-effective digital system.

UPMC Science Center has two floors and features more than 240 exhibits that explore physical science, natural science, life science, mathematics and technology.

Sunoco Performance Theater showcases 698 seats within the Orchestra, Mezzanine, and Balcony levels. The theater's design features 14 theater boxes over those levels. When it opened in 1999, there are seven resident companies at the theater: Central Pennsylvania Youth Ballet, Harrisburg Choral Society, Harrisburg Opera Association, Market Square Concerts, Susquehanna Chorale, Theatre Harrisburg and The Wednesday Club. Today, Whitaker Center hosts three resident companies: Theatre Harrisburg, Central Pennsylvania Youth Ballet, and Market Square Concerts.
