= National Register of Historic Places listings in Dauphin County, Pennsylvania =

Location of Dauphin County in Pennsylvania

This is a list of the National Register of Historic Places listings in Dauphin County, Pennsylvania.

This is intended to be a complete list of the properties and districts on the National Register of Historic Places in Dauphin County, Pennsylvania, United States. The locations of National Register properties and districts for which the latitude and longitude coordinates are included below, may be seen in a map.

There are 79 properties and districts listed on the National Register in the county. Four sites are further designated as National Historic Landmarks. Three properties were once listed, but have since been removed.

This National Park Service list is complete through NPS recent listings posted June 19, 2026.

== Current listings ==
	Name on the Register	Image	Date listed	Location	City or town	Description
1	John Ayres House	John Ayres House	September 7, 1979 (#79002215)	1801 Peter's Mountain Rd.; Northwest of Dauphin on PA 325; 40°23′54″N 76°56′52″W	Middle Paxton Township	
2	B'Nai Jacob Synagogue	B'Nai Jacob Synagogue	September 19, 1985 (#85002413)	Nissley and Water Streets; 40°11′48″N 76°44′05″W	Middletown	
3	Abraham Bomberger Farmhouse		February 26, 2026 (#100012748)	4130 Valley Road; 40°18′16″N 76°49′33″W	Harrisburg	
4	Bridge in Lykens Township No. 1	Bridge in Lykens Township No. 1	June 22, 1988 (#88000773)	Legislative Route 22001 over Pine Creek; 40°38′38″N 76°41′34″W	Lykens Township	
5	Bridge in Lykens Township No. 2	Bridge in Lykens Township No. 2	June 22, 1988 (#88000768)	Legislative Route 22033 over a tributary of Pine Creek; 40°37′58″N 76°39′52″W	Lykens Township	
6	Bridge in Reed Township	Bridge in Reed Township	June 22, 1988 (#88000823)	Legislative Route 1/Township Route 147 over Powell's Creek near Inglenook; 40°24′35″N 76°59′06″W	Reed Township	
7	Broad Street Market	Broad Street Market	December 27, 1974 (#74001780)	Verbeke Street between 3rd and 6th Streets; 40°16′12″N 76°53′17″W	Harrisburg	
8	Calver Island	Calver Island	January 17, 2007 (#06001256)	In the Susquehanna River, southeast of Harrisburg; 40°12′20″N 76°48′24″W	Swatara Township	
9	Simon Cameron House and Bank	Simon Cameron House and Bank	November 21, 1976 (#76001634)	28 and 30 East Main Street; 40°11′59″N 76°43′51″W	Middletown	
10	Simon Cameron School	Simon Cameron School	April 24, 1986 (#86000855)	1839 Green Street; 40°16′32″N 76°53′41″W	Harrisburg	
11	Camp Curtin Fire Station	Camp Curtin Fire Station	August 11, 1981 (#81000541)	2504 North 6th Street; 40°17′13″N 76°53′39″W	Harrisburg	
12	Camp Curtin Memorial Methodist Episcopal Church	Camp Curtin Memorial Methodist Episcopal Church	August 5, 2010 (#10000400)	2221 North 6th Street; 40°16′57″N 76°53′29″W	Harrisburg	
13	Clemson Island Prehistoric District	Clemson Island Prehistoric District	September 17, 1981 (#81000540)	Southern portion of Clemson Island in the Susquehanna River; 40°27′54″N 76°56′45″W	Halifax Township	
14	Colonial Theatre	Colonial Theatre	November 9, 1982 (#82001532)	3rd and Market Streets; 40°15′38″N 76°52′52″W	Harrisburg	
15	Conrad and Margaret Allerman House	Conrad and Margaret Allerman House	September 8, 2011 (#11000644)	1412 Farmhouse Lane; 40°14′12″N 76°45′50″W	Lower Swatara Township	
16	Craig Family Cemetery		November 25, 2024 (#100011045)	401 Fishing Creek Valley Road; 40°21′00″N 76°54′24″W	Harrisburg	
17	Dauphin County Bridge No. 27	Dauphin County Bridge No. 27	August 2, 1993 (#93000720)	Deibler's Dam Road (Mahantango Creek Road) across Mahantango Creek; 40°38′05″N 76°51′23″W	Mifflin Township	Extends into Lower Mahanoy Township in Northumberland County.
18	Dauphin County Courthouse	Dauphin County Courthouse	August 2, 1993 (#93000723)	Junction of Front and Market Streets; 40°15′30″N 76°52′57″W	Harrisburg	
19	Derry Session House and Enclosure	Derry Session House and Enclosure	November 21, 2006 (#06001061)	248 East Derry Road; 40°17′37″N 76°38′44″W	Derry Township	
20	William Donaldson House	William Donaldson House	April 26, 1990 (#90000699)	2005 North 3rd Street; 40°16′41″N 76°53′42″W	Harrisburg	
21	Finney House		May 4, 2026 (#100012961)	6908 Fox Hill Road; 40°21′50″N 76°46′21″W	Harrisburg	
22	Fort Hunter Historic District	Fort Hunter Historic District	August 17, 1979 (#79002216)	U.S. Route 22 at Fort Hunter; 40°20′29″N 76°54′30″W	Susquehanna Township	
23	GAR Building	GAR Building	November 5, 1986 (#86003453)	626–628 North Second Street; 40°34′04″N 76°42′01″W	Lykens	
24	German Evangelical Zion Lutheran Church	German Evangelical Zion Lutheran Church	November 12, 1975 (#75001637)	Capital and Herr Streets; 40°16′03″N 76°53′09″W	Harrisburg	
25	William R. Griffith House	William R. Griffith House	October 21, 1976 (#76001631)	215 North Front Street; 40°15′38″N 76°53′09″W	Harrisburg	
26	Harris Switch Tower, Pennsylvania Railroad	Harris Switch Tower, Pennsylvania Railroad	August 30, 1994 (#94001056)	637 Walnut Street; 40°15′54″N 76°52′44″W	Harrisburg	
27	John Harris Mansion	John Harris Mansion	September 20, 1973 (#73001620)	219 South Front Street; 40°15′24″N 76°52′44″W	Harrisburg	
28	Harrisburg 19th Street Armory	Harrisburg 19th Street Armory	November 14, 1991 (#91001696)	1313 South 19th Street; 40°15′02″N 76°51′09″W	Harrisburg	
29	Harrisburg Cemetery	Harrisburg Cemetery	March 7, 1985 (#85000866)	13th and Liberty Streets; 40°16′19″N 76°51′51″W	Harrisburg	
30	Harrisburg Central Railroad Station and Trainshed	Harrisburg Central Railroad Station and Trainshed	June 11, 1975 (#75001638)	Aberdeen Street; 40°15′43″N 76°52′40″W	Harrisburg	
31	Harrisburg Federal Building	Harrisburg Federal Building	May 8, 2026 (#100012977)	228 Walnut Street; 40°15′41″N 76°52′57″W	Harrisburg	
32	Harrisburg Historic District	Harrisburg Historic District	January 19, 1976 (#76001632)	Bounded roughly by Forster, 3rd, Hanna Streets and the Susquehanna River; 40°15′33″N 76°52′55″W	Harrisburg	
33	Harrisburg Military Post	Harrisburg Military Post	November 29, 1991 (#91001755)	Junction of 14th and Calder Streets; 40°16′44″N 76°52′30″W	Harrisburg	
34	Harrisburg Polyclinic Hospital	Harrisburg Polyclinic Hospital	November 12, 2004 (#04001225)	2601 North 3rd Street; 40°17′15″N 76°53′55″W	Harrisburg	
35	Harrisburg Technical High School	Harrisburg Technical High School	December 7, 1982 (#82001533)	423 Walnut Street; 40°15′47″N 76°52′50″W	Harrisburg	
36	Dr. William Henderson House	Dr. William Henderson House	May 14, 1979 (#79002218)	31 East Main Street; 40°15′54″N 76°42′26″W	Hummelstown	
37	Henniger Farm Covered Bridge	Henniger Farm Covered Bridge	December 18, 1978 (#78002386)	Northeast of Elizabethville; 40°34′38″N 76°47′03″W	Washington Township	
38	Hershey Community Center Building	Hershey Community Center Building	October 15, 1980 (#80003483)	2 Chocolate Avenue; 40°17′07″N 76°38′56″W	Derry Township	
39	Milton S. Hershey Mansion	Milton S. Hershey Mansion	February 7, 1978 (#78002388)	Mansion Road; 40°17′25″N 76°38′39″W	Derry Township	
40	Highspire High School	Highspire High School	April 26, 1990 (#90000703)	221 Penn Street; 40°12′36″N 76°47′27″W	Highspire	
41	Hotel Lykens	Hotel Lykens	April 25, 2016 (#16000203)	600 Main St. 40°34′01″N 76°42′01″W	Lykens	
42	Israel Building	Israel Building	April 25, 2016 (#16000204)	601 Main St. 40°34′02″N 76°42′01″W	Lykens	
43	Keystone Building	Keystone Building	September 7, 1979 (#79002217)	18–22 South 3rd Street; 40°15′37″N 76°52′49″W	Harrisburg	
44	Keystone Hotel	Keystone Hotel	May 9, 1985 (#85001002)	40 East Main Street; 40°15′57″N 76°42′21″W	Hummelstown	
45	Kunkel Building	Kunkel Building	November 9, 1982 (#82001534)	301 Market Street; 40°15′39″N 76°52′51″W	Harrisburg	
46	Legislative Route 1 Sycamore Allee	Legislative Route 1 Sycamore Allee	February 7, 2007 (#07000029)	Legislative Route 1, approximately 1 mile (1.6 km) north and south of Halifax; 40°26′51″N 76°56′29″W	Halifax and Reed Townships	
47	Lincoln Cemetery		June 24, 2026 (#100013150)	201 South 30th Street & Penbrook Avenue; 40°16′51″N 76°51′20″W	Susquehanna Township	
48	Market Street Bridge	Market Street Bridge	June 22, 1988 (#88000759)	Market Street/Legislative Route 34 over the Susquehanna River; 40°15′27″N 76°53′00″W	Harrisburg	Extends into Cumberland County
49	Enoch Matlack House	Enoch Matlack House	June 22, 1979 (#79002219)	250 East Main Street; 40°15′57″N 76°42′08″W	Hummelstown	
50	Archibald McAllister House	Archibald McAllister House	June 7, 1976 (#76001633)	5300 North Front Street in Fort Hunter; 40°20′34″N 76°54′37″W	Susquehanna Township	
51	Midland Cemetery		April 27, 2023 (#100008865)	206 Kelker St. 40°14′14″N 76°49′36″W	Swatara Township	
52	Midtown Harrisburg Historic District	Midtown Harrisburg Historic District	April 21, 1983 (#83002237)	Roughly bounded by the Susquehanna River and Forster, Verbeke, and 3rd Streets; 40°16′02″N 76°53′26″W	Harrisburg	
53	Millersburg Ferry	Millersburg Ferry	August 2, 2006 (#06000663)	Over the Susquehanna River between Millersburg and Buffalo Township; 40°32′39″N 76°58′25″W	Millersburg	Extends into Buffalo Township in Perry County
54	Millersburg Passenger Rail Station	Millersburg Passenger Rail Station	November 27, 2002 (#02001430)	127 West Center Street; 40°32′25″N 76°57′48″W	Millersburg	
55	Mount Pleasant Historic District	Mount Pleasant Historic District	January 11, 1985 (#85000079)	Sylvan Terrace to 19th Street, Market to Brookwood Streets; 40°15′44″N 76°51′56″W	Harrisburg	
56	Old Downtown Harrisburg Commercial Historic District	Old Downtown Harrisburg Commercial Historic District	July 14, 1983 (#83002238)	Dewberry, Chestnut, Blackberry, and South 3rd Streets; 40°15′37″N 76°52′47″W	Harrisburg	
57	Old Uptown Harrisburg Historic District	Old Uptown Harrisburg Historic District	January 4, 1990 (#89002297)	Roughly bounded by McClay, North 3rd, Reily, North 2nd, and Calder; 40°16′26″N 76°53′43″W	Harrisburg	
58	William Penn Memorial Museum and State Archives Building	William Penn Memorial Museum and State Archives Building	August 1, 2014 (#14000467)	300 North St. 40°15′57″N 76°53′10″W	Harrisburg	
59	Pennsylvania Railroad GG1 Streamlined Electric Locomotive #4859	Pennsylvania Railroad GG1 Streamlined Electric Locomotive #4859	May 5, 2004 (#04000399)	Track 5, Harrisburg Transportation Center, Aberdeen Street; 40°15′45″N 76°52′40″W	Harrisburg	
60	Pennsylvania State Lunatic Hospital	Pennsylvania State Lunatic Hospital	January 8, 1986 (#86000057)	Cameron Street; 40°16′59″N 76°52′24″W	Harrisburg	
61	Quarries of the Hummelstown Brownstone Company	Quarries of the Hummelstown Brownstone Company	February 27, 2003 (#03000075)	Roughly north of Brookline Drive, Amber Drive; 40°13′48″N 76°41′30″W	Derry Township	
62	Charles and Joseph Raymond Houses	Charles and Joseph Raymond Houses	August 1, 1979 (#79002221)	38 and 37 North Union Street; 40°11′43″N 76°43′52″W	Middletown	
63	Rockville Bridge	Rockville Bridge	August 15, 1975 (#75001640)	0.5 miles (0.80 km) south of Marysville over the Susquehanna River; 40°19′59″N 76°54′42″W	Susquehanna Township	Extends into Perry County
64	Romberger-Stover House	Romberger-Stover House	August 29, 1980 (#80003481)	Market Street; 40°36′09″N 76°48′42″W	Berrysburg	
65	St. Peter's Kierch	St. Peter's Kierch	June 18, 1973 (#73001621)	31 West High Street; 40°12′04″N 76°43′56″W	Middletown	
66	Salem United Church of Christ	Salem United Church of Christ	April 23, 1975 (#75001639)	231 Chestnut Street; 40°15′34″N 76°52′45″W	Harrisburg	
67	William Seel Building	William Seel Building	December 3, 1980 (#80003482)	319 Market Street; 40°15′41″N 76°52′48″W	Harrisburg	
68	Sheffield Apartments	Sheffield Apartments	April 26, 1990 (#90000698)	2003 North 3rd Street; 40°16′40″N 76°53′42″W	Harrisburg	
69	Shoop Site (36DA20)		February 13, 1986 (#86000241)	East of Enders; 40°29′14″N 76°49′12″W	Jackson and Wayne Townships	
70	Henry Smith Farm	Henry Smith Farm	December 22, 1988 (#88003050)	950 Swatara Creek Road; 40°12′46″N 76°42′56″W	Middletown	
71	Soldiers and Sailors Memorial Bridge	Soldiers and Sailors Memorial Bridge	June 22, 1988 (#88000761)	Legislative Route 140/State Street over Legislative Route 130 Spur and Paxton Creek; 40°16′02″N 76°52′43″W	Harrisburg	
72	Star Barn Complex	Star Barn Complex	July 27, 2000 (#00000845)	Nissley Drive at Pennsylvania Route 283; 40°13′25″N 76°46′17″W	Lower Swatara Township	
73	Pennsylvania State Capitol Complex	Pennsylvania State Capitol Complex	September 14, 1977 (#77001162)	Bounded by 3rd and 7th, North and Walnut Streets; 40°15′52″N 76°53′02″W	Harrisburg	Boundary revised February 27, 2013 to include the Pennsylvania State Capitol and surrounding buildings.
74	Steelton High School	Steelton High School	September 8, 2011 (#11000645)	100 South 4th Street; 40°14′06″N 76°50′12″W	Steelton	
75	Swatara Ferry House	Swatara Ferry House	September 27, 1976 (#76001635)	400 Swatara Street; 40°11′29″N 76°43′57″W	Middletown	
76	John Todd House	John Todd House	November 3, 1988 (#88002371)	South Meadow Lane; 40°21′07″N 76°40′15″W	East Hanover Township	
77	Walnut Street Bridge	Walnut Street Bridge	June 5, 1972 (#72001115)	Walnut Street over the Susquehanna River; 40°15′18″N 76°53′19″W	Harrisburg	
78	Zion Lutheran Church and Graveyard	Zion Lutheran Church and Graveyard	March 29, 1979 (#79002220)	Rosanna Street; 40°15′58″N 76°42′39″W	Hummelstown	
79	Zembo Shrine	Zembo Shrine	February 12, 2024 (#100009919)	2801 North Third Street; 40°17′26″N 76°54′03″W	Harrisburg	

== Former listings ==
	Name on the Register	Image	Date listed	Date removed	Location	City or town	Description
1	Greenawalt Building	Greenawalt Building	February 24, 1983 (#83002235)	March 10, 1998	118-120 Market Street	Harrisburg	
2	Senate Hotel	Senate Hotel	February 1, 1983 (#82001535)	June 5, 1997	122 Market St.	Harrisburg	
3	Telegraph Building	Telegraph Building	March 3, 1978 (#78002387)	June 27, 1986	214-216 Locust Street	Harrisburg	

== See also ==
- List of National Historic Landmarks in Pennsylvania
- National Register of Historic Places listings in Pennsylvania
- List of Pennsylvania state historical markers in Dauphin County
