= Old Downtown Harrisburg Commercial Historic District =

Historic district in Pennsylvania, United States

- U.S. National Register of Historic Places
- U.S. Historic district
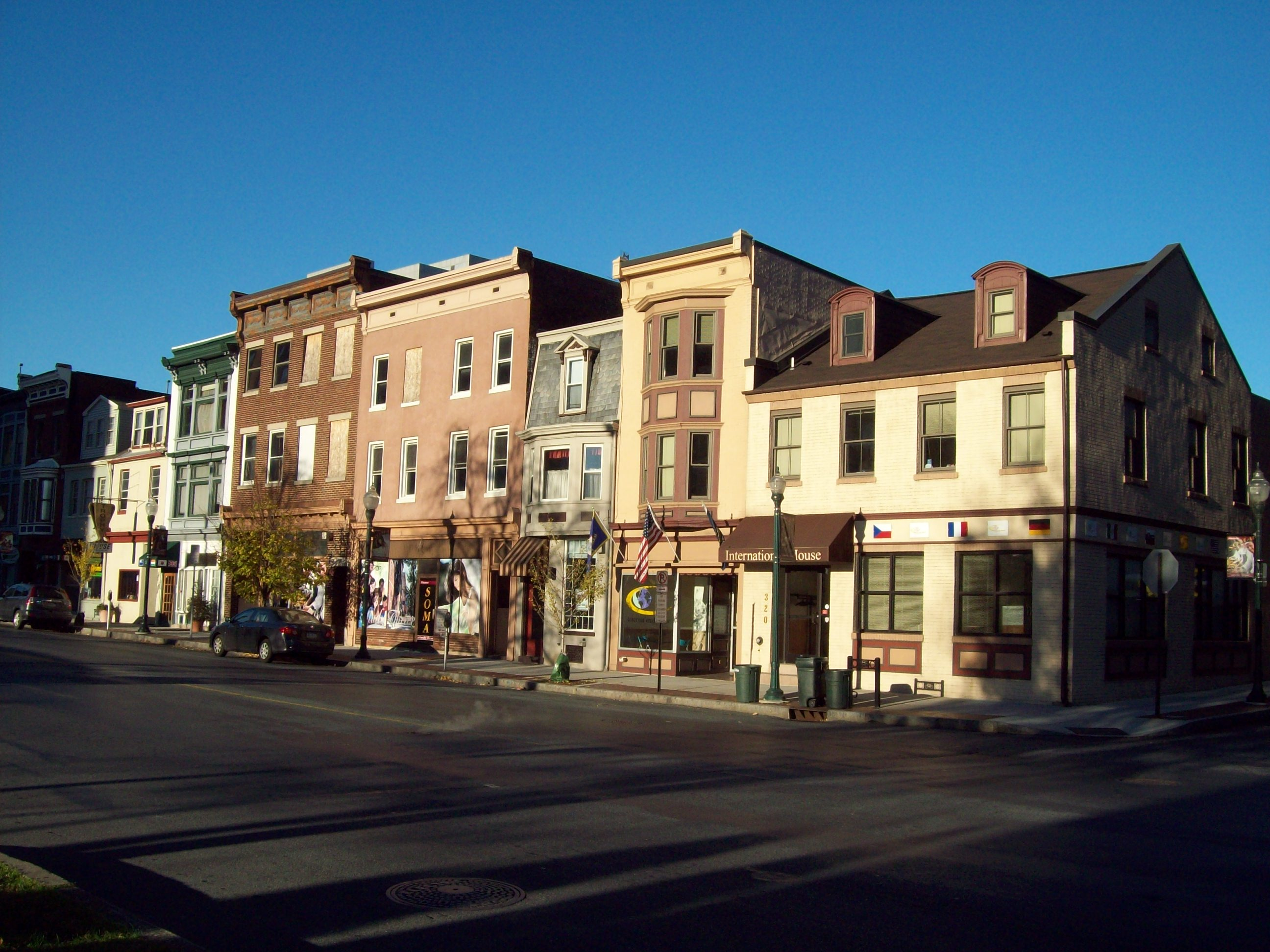
- Old Downtown Harrisburg Commercial Historic District, November 2010

- Location within Pennsylvania Location within the United States
- Location: Dewberry, Chestnut, Blackberry, and S. 3rd Sts., roughly Market St. from 3rd to 4th and 3rd St. from Walnut to Chestnut Sts., Harrisburg, Pennsylvania
- Coordinates: 40°15′37″N 76°52′47″W
- Area: 9.5 acres (3.8 ha)
- Architectural style: Late 19th- and 20th-century Revivals, late Victorian, Greek Revival, Italianate, Queen Anne
- NRHP reference No.: 83002238 (original); 84003198 (increase)

Significant dates
- Added to NRHP: July 14, 1983
- Boundary increase: March 22, 1984

The Old Downtown Harrisburg Commercial Historic District is a national historic district in Harrisburg, Pennsylvania.

It was added to the National Register of Historic Places in 1983, with a boundary increase made in 1984.

== History and architectural features ==
This district includes fifty contributing buildings that are located in the old central business district of Harrisburg. Dating from the late nineteenth and early twentieth centuries, notable buildings include the Daily and Weekly Telegraph Building (1873–1874), the City Bank Building (c. 1872), F. W. Woolworth (1939), Rothert's Furniture Store (1906), Bowman's Department Store (1907, 1910), Pomeroy's Department Store (c. 1890, c. 1940), and Doutrich's Clothing Store.

Also located in the district but listed separately are the Colonial Theatre, the Keystone Building, the Kunkel Building, and the William Seel Building. The Telegraph Building was delisted after having been demolished.

It was added to the National Register of Historic Places in 1983, with a boundary increase in 1984.
