= The Brotherhood of Satan =

1971 film by Bernard McEveety

- Theatrical release poster
- Directed by: Bernard McEveety
- Written by: William Welch
- Story by: Sean MacGregor
- Produced by: L. Q. Jones; Alvy Moore
- Starring: Strother Martin; L. Q. Jones; Ahna Capri
- Cinematography: John Arthur Morrill
- Edited by: Marvin Walowitz
- Music by: Jaime Mendoza-Nava
- Production companies: Four Star Excelsior; LQ/JAF
- Distributed by: Columbia Pictures
- Release dates: April 21, 1971 (Harrisburg, Pennsylvania); August 6, 1971 (U.S.)
- Running time: 92 minutes
- Country: United States
- Language: English

The Brotherhood of Satan is a 1971 American supernatural horror film directed by Bernard McEveety, produced by L. Q. Jones and Alvy Moore, and starring Jones, Strother Martin, Charles Bateman, Ahna Capri, and Geri Reischl. Its plot follows Ben Holden, a widower who, while traveling through the American Southwest with his young daughter K. T. and girlfriend Nicky, arrive in a small California town where a coven of Satanist witches are kidnapping the local children with the intent of transferring their own souls into the children's bodies as a means of achieving immortality.

Filming for The Brotherhood of Satan took place in New Mexico and California. The film premiered at the Colonial Theatre in Harrisburg, Pennsylvania, on April 21, 1971, before receiving a wide theatrical release by Columbia Pictures on August 6, 1971.

== Plot ==
Widowed Ben Holden, his young daughter K. T., and his girlfriend Nicky, are on a road trip through the California desert. On a sharp corner along the highway, they spot a smoldering demolished car along with what appears to be human remains. Ben quickly drives to the nearest town of Hillsboro to report the incident, but upon arriving, is attacked by the town sheriff, Pete, while the town residents hide in their homes and observe the scene. Pete releases Ben, and the family flee.

Unbeknownst to Ben, the town is on edge because 26 of its residents have met violent deaths in the past three days, and numerous children have disappeared. Pete, his deputy Tobey, and the town physician, Dr. Duncan, travel to the wreckage along the highway. They find that the two adult drivers were killed, and that their young son, Timmy—also a resident of Hillsboro—is missing. Ben, fleeing Hillsboro, is startled by a young girl who appears in the road, and crashes his car. With nowhere to go, he, Nicky, and K. T. head back toward Hillsboro on foot.

That night, resident Ed Meadows and his wife, Mildred, are inexplicably killed in their home after one of their daughter's dolls apparently comes to life. Meanwhile, at the abandoned Barry house overlooking the town, Dr. Duncan gathers in a secret room with the elderly residents of the town. The elders are in fact a coven of witches who worship Satan, and Dr. Duncan is their leader. During their ceremony, numerous children stand entranced on pedestals, vessels into which the witches plan to transfer their souls. Shortly after, Ed's son Stuart, and daughter, Phyllis, join a group of children outside their home, who escort them to the Barry house.

Ben, Nicky, and K. T. reach the Meadows home, and find Ed and Mildred's corpses. In town, Ben and his family are welcomed to spend the night at Pete's home, where Dr. Duncan makes an unannounced visit. Meanwhile, Jack, the town's Catholic priest, suspects an evil influence in the town, and stays up late into the night researching devil worship. In his studies, he notices a preponderance of children figuring in the literature. Back at Pete's house, Nicky suffers a nightmare. In the morning, Ben decides they should leave. Peter allows them to borrow his car, but they get a flat tire on the edge of town. Upon exiting the car, Ben and Nicky realize that K. T. has vanished from the backseat.

K. T. joins the town's children at the Barry house, where they play with toys and other party favors in a room decorated with murals of dead children and cloaked figures. Ben and Nicky return to town to report K. T. missing, and are met by Father Jack, who tells them she has been kidnapped by witches, who he believes will use her and the other missing children in a Satanic ritual. Meanwhile, Mike, another local resident, finds his son Joey wandering out of their home in a trance. He runs after him into the woods, where he is decapitated by an armored figure riding a horse. Father Jack witnesses the incident, and flees in terror to report it to Pete, Ben, and Tobey.

Now having acquired a child for each member of the coven, Dr. Duncan begins the ritual at the Barry house, entreating Satan to help transfer their souls into the bodies of the young. Meanwhile, Ben, Pete, Tobey, and Father Jack unite and rush to the Barry house. Outside, Pete finds a toy horseman lying on the ground, with a blood-covered lance. This terrifies Father Jack, who realizes that the coven have been causing the children's toys to manifest as instruments to kill their parents. The men quickly break into the house, but find they have arrived too late—the witches have all perished, and their souls transferred into the children. When Ben, Pete, and Tobey break down the door to the ceremonial room, they find K. T. and the other children gathered around a cobweb-covered table, along with dolls resembling some of the coven members. The children stare at the men in silence.

== Cast ==
- Strother Martin as Doc Duncan
- L. Q. Jones as Sheriff Pete
- Charles Bateman as Ben Holden
- Ahna Capri as Nicky
- Charles Robinson as Father Jack
- Alvy Moore as Deputy Tobey
- Helene Winston as Dame Alice
- Joyce Easton as Mildred Meadows
- Debi Storm as Billie Joe
- Jeff Williams as Stuart Meadows
- Judy McConnell as Phyllis Meadows
- Robert Ward as Mike
- Geri Reischl as K. T. Holden

Moore's daughter and mother appear in the film, as one of the children and one of the witches, respectively.

== Production ==
L. Q. Jones drafted a script for The Brotherhood of Satan while researching witchcraft at the UCLA Library. Alvy Moore, when asked why he and Jones chose to produce a film in the horror genre, answered, "Greed, sheer greed. We had a choice of subjects, but we had to look at what's selling today, and there's no doubt that witchcraft and assorted psychic phenomena are very popular."

The Brotherhood of Satan was filmed in Albuquerque, New Mexico, in August 1969. Additional filming took place in Hillsboro, New Mexico, and Hollywood, California. Anton LaVey, the founder of the Church of Satan, was consulted to design the altar featured in the film, but he said he was "unfortunately called in on too late to change the extravagant altar they'd already spent too much money on to rip apart for authenticity's sake."

The film's original title was Come In, Children, a title which Jones preferred over The Brotherhood of Satan. Speaking to reporters in Fort Worth, Texas, around the time of the film's release, Jones stated:

"Brotherhood of Satan" sounds like your stock monster picture. You know—the giant clams eating up the friendly natives. This film of ours is a different type. We've got a little blood in it—to appease the popcorn rattlers—but there are no silver bullets or crosses or stakes. The ending is deliberately up in the air. We don't explain it, we just lay it out. If you don't like it, you can tear up the seats. If you like it, crazy.

== Novelization ==
A book adaptation of the same name, written by Jones and based on the film's screenplay, was published in 1971, ahead of the film's release.

== Release ==
Columbia Pictures premiered The Brotherhood of Satan at the Colonial Theatre in Harrisburg, Pennsylvania, on April 21, 1971; the film screened there for at least two weeks for test market purposes. Jones appeared as a guest for a screening and meet-and-greet event in Scranton on June 16, 1971.

The Brotherhood of Satan's theatrical release expanded in the northeastern United States before receiving a wide theatrical release by Columbia in the United States and Ontario, Canada, on August 6, 1971. As a promotional gimmick, theatergoers purchasing tickets for The Brotherhood of Satan received packets of seeds bearing the film's logo; instructions on the backs of the packets assert that the seeds can "protect from the Black Magic of the Brotherhood of Satan!"

=== Home media ===
The Brotherhood of Satan was released on VHS in 1986 by RCA/Columbia Pictures Home Video (OCLC 22091401). It received a DVD release in 2002 by Columbia TriStar Home Entertainment (ISBN 0-7678-8253-9).

In 2013, Mill Creek Entertainment released the film on Blu-ray, packaged together as a double feature with the 1961 film Mr. Sardonicus. In 2021, The Brotherhood of Satan was re-released as a standalone Blu-ray by Arrow Films.

== Reception ==
Roger Greenspun, in his review of the film for The New York Times, highlighted some "wonderfully spooky scenes" but wrote that, "the actual brotherhood (and sisterhood) is a pretty dismal affair—a kind of black-magic golden-age club to whom hooded figures serve cocktails before they settle down to their blood and witchcraft." Ann Guarino, writing for the New York Daily News, gave the film a score of two-and-a-half out of four stars, criticizing the screenplay as illogical: "You have to forget details to get a few chills out of this one."

Jeanne Miller of the San Francisco Examiner complimented the film's pacing and production values, calling it "unusually well-made for its genre," but found that, "[...] the exploitation of children for weird Satanic rites is more unnerving than exciting. [...] most of the tension consists of a cringing unwillingness to see any more of these lovely kids become monsters." Sam Hoffman of The Republican lamented the film's "dull script" and called Strother Martin "the only worthwhile actor in the show"; he added, "The film's big plus is its cinematography which captures all the gore and killings and rituals—in color." The Ottawa Citizen's Gordon Stoneham called the film "a low-budget but effective demonic thriller." Martin Malina of The Montreal Star commended the performances of Martin, Jones, and Moore, and wrote, "As horror pictures go, this one is not much of a spine-tingler. But there are several highly imaginative scenes [...] which alone justify the price of admission."

On the review aggregator website Rotten Tomatoes, the film has an approval rating of 13% based on eight reviews, with an average rating of 4.4/10.

== In popular culture ==
The industrial dance group My Life with the Thrill Kill Kult sampled The Brotherhood of Satan in the song "Rivers of Blood, Years of Darkness" from their 1990 Confessions of a Knife... album. French Stoner/Doom metal band Witchthroat Serpent also added a sample of The Brotherhood of Satan into their song "Cursed Night Circle" from their 2026 album "Demons Left to Roam".

== See also ==
- List of American films of 1971

== Sources ==
- Barton, Blanche (2014). The Secret Life of a Satanist: The Authorized Biography of Anton Szandor LaVey. Port Townsend, Washington: Feral House. ISBN 978-1-627-31007-9.
- Markusen, Bruce (2021). Hosted Horror on Television: The Films and Faces of Shock Theater, Creature Features and Chiller Theater. Jefferson, North Carolina: McFarland & Company. ISBN 978-1-476-68461-1.
- Pitts, Michael R. (2014). Columbia Pictures Horror, Science Fiction and Fantasy Films, 1928–1982. Jefferson, North Carolina: McFarland & Company. ISBN 978-0-786-45766-3.
