= Greenawalt =

Greenawalt is a surname. Notable people with the surname include:

- Abraham Greenawalt (1834–1922), Union Army soldier
- R. Kent Greenawalt (1936–2023), American civil rights lawyer and academic
- Randy Greenawalt (1949–1997), American serial killer executed in Arizona
- Roger Greenawalt (born 1960), American musician

== See also ==
- Greenawalt Building, a building in Harrisburg, Pennsylvania, United States
