= Old Uptown Historic District (Harrisburg) =

Historic district in Pennsylvania, United States

- Olde Uptown Harrisburg Historic District
- U.S. National Register of Historic Places
- U.S. Historic district
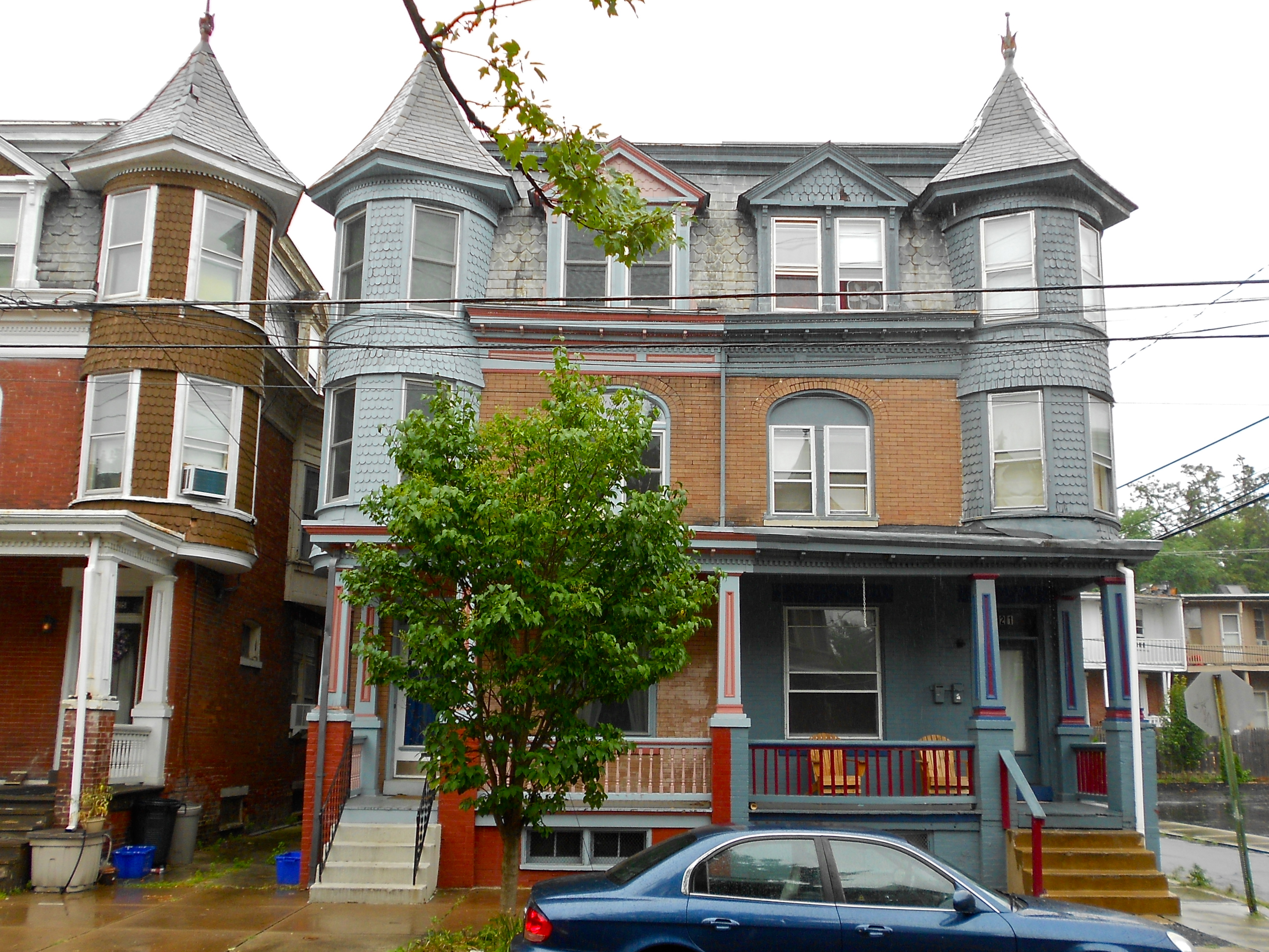
- House on Green Street

- Location within Pennsylvania Location within the United States
- Location: Roughly bounded by McClay, N. Third, Reily, N. Second, and Calder, Harrisburg, Pennsylvania
- Coordinates: 40°16′26″N 76°53′43″W
- Area: 63.1 acres (25.5 ha)
- Architectural style: Italianate, Queen Anne, Romanesque
- NRHP reference No.: 89002297
- Added to NRHP: January 4, 1990

The Old Uptown Historic District is a historic district in the Midtown neighborhood of Harrisburg, Pennsylvania. The district stretches from Reily to Maclay between Second and Third street. It consists of large Queen Anne and Italianate architecture built in the late 19th century and very early 20th century. The northern part of the historic district is currently being aggressively renovated by real estate investors.

It was listed on the National Register of Historic Places in 1990.

== Places of Note ==
- Simon Cameron School
- William Donaldson House

== See also ==
- List of Harrisburg neighborhoods
