= Dauphin County Courthouse =

- U.S. National Register of Historic Places
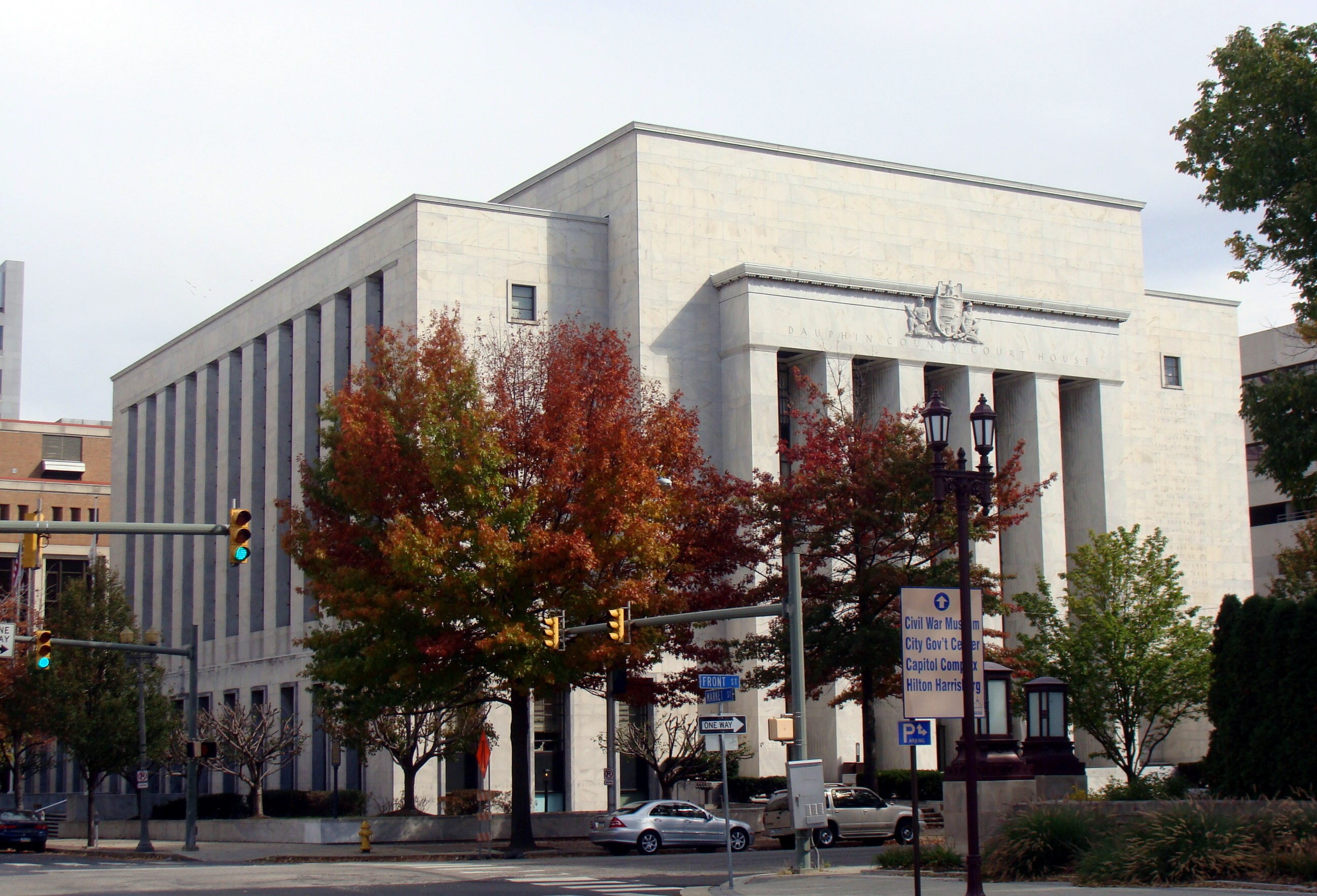

- Location within Pennsylvania
- Interactive map showing the location of Dauphin County Courthouse
- Location: Front and Market Sts, Harrisburg, PA
- Coordinates: 40°15′30″N 76°52′57″W
- Built: 1942
- Architect: Lawrie and Green; C. Paul Jennewein
- Architectural style: Stripped Classical
- NRHP reference No.: 93000723
- Added to NRHP: August 2, 1993

The Dauphin County Courthouse is a government building of Dauphin County located in the county seat, Harrisburg, Pennsylvania. It was listed on the National Register of Historic Places on August 2, 1993.

== History ==
The current building is the third county courthouse built in Dauphin County. The first courthouse was built in 1792 at Market and Court Streets. The first courthouse was removed in 1860 and the second was built in its location. The second building was removed in 1948. Plans were drawn up for a new courthouse in 1938 due to complaints about the deteriorating conditions of the building. The current courthouse was designed in 1940 by the Harrisburg architectural firm Lawrie and Green. It was completed in 1942. The interior artwork was done by sculptor C. Paul Jennewein.

== See also ==
- National Register of Historic Places listings in Dauphin County, Pennsylvania
- List of state and county courthouses in Pennsylvania
