= B'nai Jacob Synagogue (Middletown, Pennsylvania) =

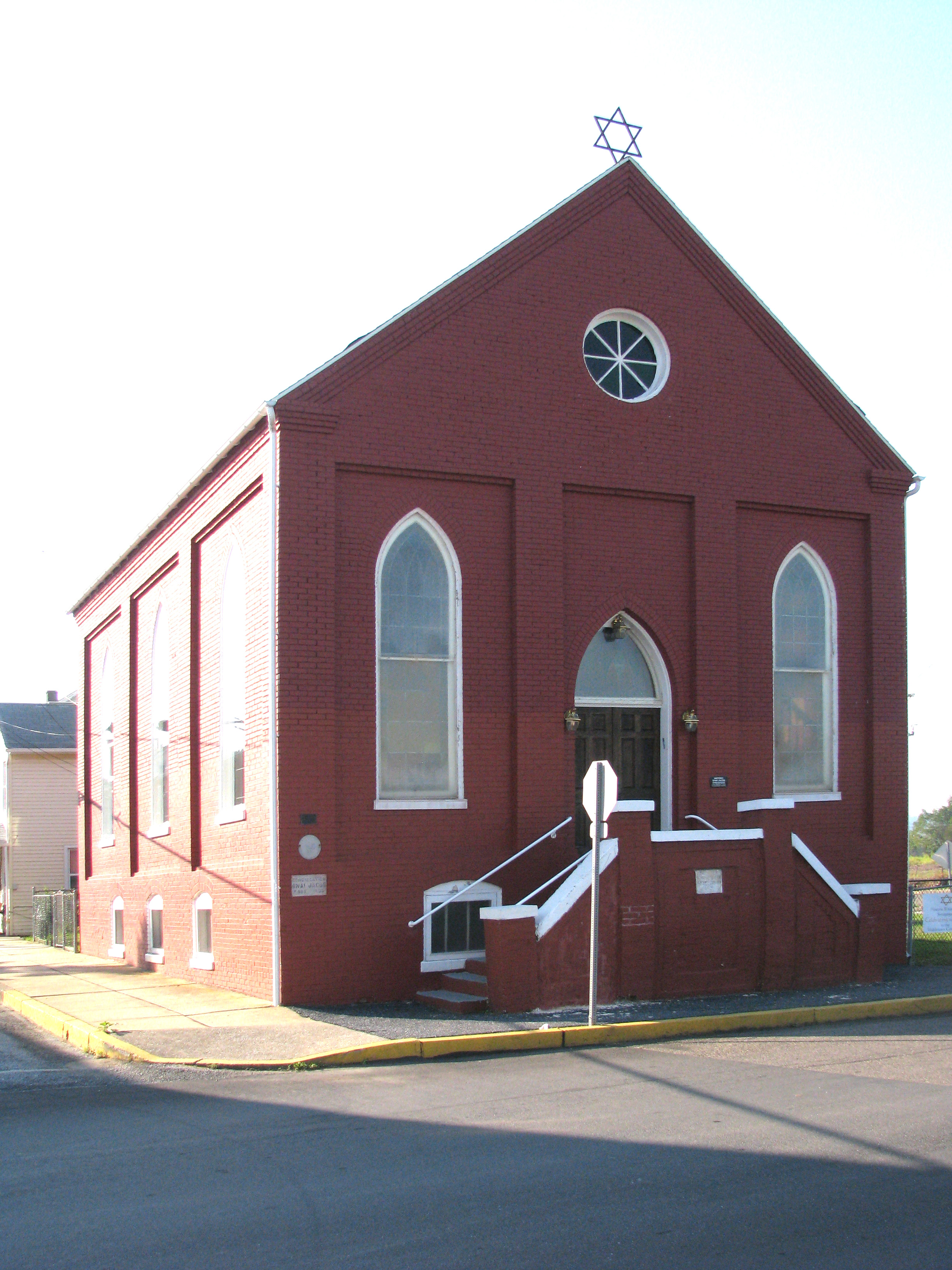
- B'nai Jacob Synagogue, September 2012

- Location in Pennsylvania

Religion
- Affiliation: Conservative Judaism
- Ecclesiastical or organizational status: Synagogue
- Leadership: Rabbi: vacant
- Status: Active

Location
- Location: Nissley and Water Streets, Middletown, Pennsylvania 17057
- Country: United States
- Interactive map of B'nai Jacob Synagogue
- Coordinates: 40°11′48″N 76°44′5″W

Architecture
- Established: 1906 (as a congregation)
- Completed: 1906
- Materials: Brick

Website
- bnai-jacob.org
- B'nai Jacob Synagogue
- U.S. National Register of Historic Places
- Area: 0.3 acres (0.12 ha)
- NRHP reference No.: 85002413
- Added to NRHP: September 19, 1985

B'nai Jacob Synagogue is a historic Conservative synagogue at the intersection of Nissley and Water Streets in Middletown, Dauphin County, Pennsylvania, United States.

== History ==
It was built in 1906, and is a one-story brick building with a front gabled roof. The front façade features brick recessed panels with pointed arched windows and a circular window. Atop the front gable is a Star of David. It is the oldest building erected as a synagogue in Dauphin County.

It was added to the National Register of Historic Places in 1985.

== See also ==
- National Register of Historic Places listings in Dauphin County, Pennsylvania
- Jewish history in Pennsylvania
