= St. Peter's Kierch =

Historic church in Pennsylvania, United States

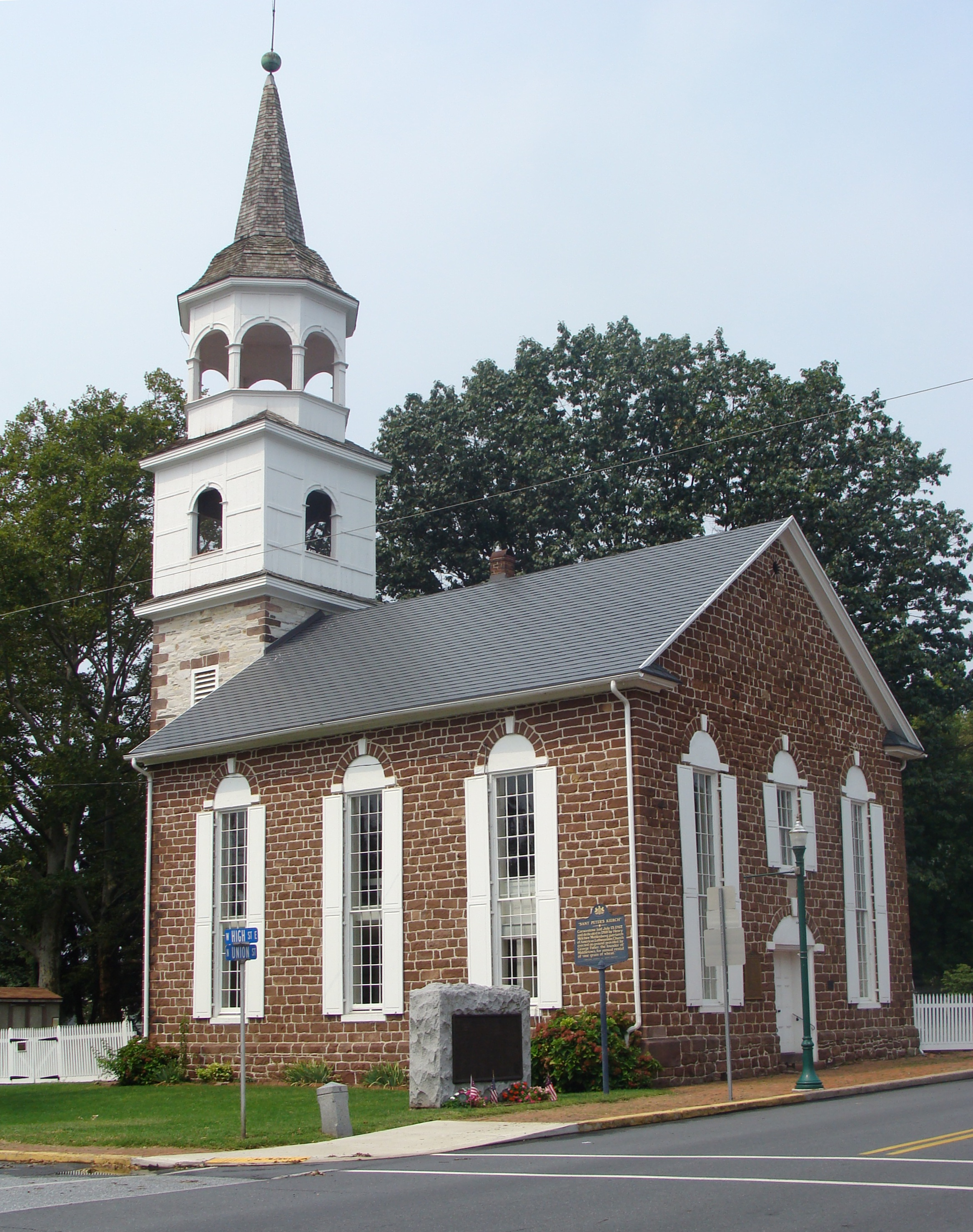

- Location within Pennsylvania

Religion
- Affiliation: Evangelical Lutheran Church in America
- Region: Lower Susquehanna Synod

Location
- Location: 31 West High Street; Middletown Pennsylvania; United States
- Coordinates: 40°12′04″N 76°43′56″W

Architecture
- Type: Georgian
- Groundbreaking: July 13, 1767
- Completed: 1769

Specifications
- Capacity: 225
- Materials: Sandstone

U.S. National Register of Historic Places
- Added to NRHP: June 17, 1983
- NRHP Reference no.: 7301621
- Pennsylvania Historical Marker
- Designated: February 28, 1969

St. Peter's Kierch, also called the Old Kierch or St. Peter's Church, is a historic Lutheran church in Middletown, Dauphin County in the U.S. state of Pennsylvania, United States. Construction began in 1767 and it was dedicated by Henry Muhlenberg in 1769. St. Peter's Kierch was used regularly until 1879 when a large church was completed. It was listed on the National Register of Historic Places in 1973.

== Design ==
St. Peter's Kierch is a 2½-story, Georgian-style church at the intersection of Union and High Streets in Middletown. The church was constructed from red sandstone. Originally, galleries were located on the east, west and south sides with the wineglass pulpit on the north side. The bell tower was constructed 46 years after the rest of the church, on the west side, as it was not intended to be used an entrance. The sides of the church have three windows reaching to the upper story. Each window has forty-four 9-by-12-inch (23 cm × 30 cm) panes of glass—eleven panes high, four across.

== History ==
On September 18, 1764, with the intent of constructing a Lutheran church, a plot of land was purchased by some local residents from George Fisher, founder of Middletown, for 7 shillings and 6 pence, along with an annual rent of one grain of wheat.

The cornerstone of the church was laid on July 13, 1767 by James Burd. The church was dedicated by Henry Muhlenberg on September 12, 1769. The bell tower was constructed in 1813; the bell was cast in Philadelphia by Hedderly and Leverin and hung in 1815.

In 1876, the growth on the congregation led to the decision to build a new church several blocks south of the old one, at Spring and Union Streets. The last regular service was held at the Kierch on January 26, 1879. It is still used, however, for "occasional services and funerals" as well as other special events. St. Peter's Kierch was listed on the National Register of Historic Places on June 17, 1973.

The church has an adjacent cemetery, locally called "God's Acre", that has about 210 people buried who fought in the American Revolution.

== See also ==
- National Register of Historic Places listings in Dauphin County, Pennsylvania

== Sources ==
- Pennsylvania Register of Historic Sites and Landmarks (July 1972). National Register of Historic Places Registration: Pennsylvania SP St. Peter's Kierch. National Archives and Records Administration. (Downloading may be slow.)
