= Strother Martin =

American actor (1919–1980)

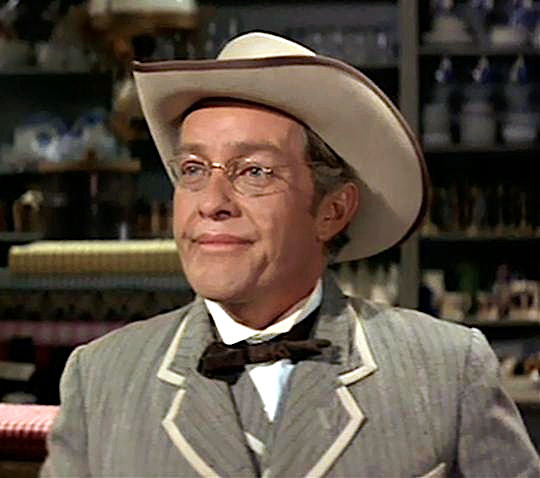
- Martin in McLintock! (1963)
- Born: Strother Douglas Martin Jr. March 26, 1919; Kokomo, Indiana, U.S.
- Died: August 1, 1980 (aged 61); Thousand Oaks, California, U.S.
- Resting place: Forest Lawn Memorial Park, Hollywood Hills
- Education: University of Michigan
- Occupation: Actor
- Years active: 1950–1980
- Spouse: Helen Meisels (m. 1967)
- Military career
- Allegiance: United States
- Branch: United States Navy
- Service years: 1942–46
- Rank: Petty officer third class
- Conflicts: World War II

Strother Douglas Martin Jr. (March 26, 1919 – August 1, 1980) was an American actor, who appeared in over 170 film and television productions between 1950 and 1980, mainly in character roles. He often appeared in support of John Wayne and Paul Newman, and in Westerns directed by John Ford and Sam Peckinpah. He was nominated for a Golden Globe Award for his role on the television legal drama Hawkins (1973–74).

== Early life ==
Martin was born March 26, 1919, in Kokomo, Indiana to Ethel (née Dunlap, 1892–1959) and Strother Douglas Martin (1889–1953). For a short time, the Martins lived in San Antonio, Texas, but soon returned to Indiana. As a child, he excelled at swimming and diving. He was nicknamed "T-Bone Martin" because of his diving expertise. At 17 he won the National Junior Springboard Diving Championship. He served as a swimming instructor in the United States Navy during World War II and was a member of the diving team at the University of Michigan in Ann Arbor, Michigan. He entered the adult National Springboard Diving competition in hopes of gaining a berth on the U.S. Olympic team, but finished third in the competition.

== Career ==
After the war, Martin moved to Los Angeles and worked as a swimming instructor and as a swimming extra in water scenes in films, including the 1950 crime drama The Damned Don't Cry. He earned bit roles in a number of pictures and soon gained frequent character roles in films and television through the 1950s, having appeared in such programs as the Western anthology series Frontier on NBC and the syndicated American Civil War drama Gray Ghost. He was cast in 1955 as Landry Kersh in the episode "Shadow of God" on the ABC religion anthology series Crossroads. Martin also portrays a man with learning difficulties in "Cooter", an episode written by Sam Peckinpah in 1956 for the first season of the long-running Western series Gunsmoke. He had many various, and prominent, roles throughout the entire series. The next year on that series he played the character "Dillard" in "The Constable".

Martin appeared in the first Brian Keith series, Crusader, a Cold War drama on CBS. He guest-starred as circus tightrope walker Dooley Delaware in the 1957 episode "High Wire" of CBS' Have Gun - Will Travel. He portrayed a henpecked soldier in a 1958 episode of the syndicated Western series Boots and Saddles and starred in a Trackdown episode, "A Stone for Benny French". That same year, he played the lead in the episode "Pete Henke" of NBC's Western Jefferson Drum.

In 1959, Martin played Polk, with Denver Pyle as Houston, in the episode "No Place to Stop" of the CBS Western series, The Texan, starring Rory Calhoun as Bill Longley. In another 1959 Western series, Martin was cast as Deputy Jess in the episode "Johnny Yuma" of ABC's The Rebel, starring Nick Adams. He played land surveyor Meeker in "Rawhide" S2 E8 "Incident of the Haunted Hills" which aired 11/5/1959. Also, in 1959 on the Western TV series Lawman, Season 2 E8, he played Jack Foley. In 1960, Martin guest-starred in James Whitmore's ABC crime drama, The Law and Mr. Jones.

In 1961, Martin portrayed Pete Gibson in the episode "The Case of the Brazen Bequest" on Perry Mason. In 1962, he was cast as Harold Horton in "The Chocolate Cake Caper" of the CBS sitcom, Pete and Gladys, starring Harry Morgan and Cara Williams. He guest-starred in Jack Lord's ABC adventure/drama series, Stoney Burke. In 1963, he was cast as Private Anton Copang in the episode "Walk Through the Badlands" of the ABC/Warner Brothers Western series, The Dakotas. In 1966, Martin appeared twice as "Cousin Fletch" in the short-lived ABC comedy Western The Rounders, with Ron Hayes, Patrick Wayne, and Chill Wills.

Among Martin's memorable performances is his portrayal of the warden or "captain" of a state prison camp in the 1967 film Cool Hand Luke, in which he utters the line, "What we've got here is failure to communicate." The line is number 11 on the American Film Institute list of 100 Years...100 Movie Quotes.

That same year, Martin played Arizona miner Ed Schieffelin in the episode "Silver Tombstone" of the syndicated television series Death Valley Days. Martin played villainous roles in many of the best-known Westerns of the 1950s and 1960s, including The Horse Soldiers and The Man Who Shot Liberty Valance. He played an Indian agent in the John Wayne film, McLintock! (1963) and a horse trader in the 1969 film, True Grit (1969).

By the late 1960s, Martin was almost as well-known a figure as many top-billed stars. In 1967, the same year as his role in Cool Hand Luke, he appeared in the episode "A Mighty Hunter Before the Lord" of NBC's The Road West series starring Barry Sullivan. In 1972, he appeared as James Garner's uncle in the "Zacharia" episode of NBC's Nichols. He also had a pronounced physical and vocal resemblance to playwright Tennessee Williams and occasionally parodied him, notably in the "Baby Fat" episode of The Dick Van Dyke Show.

The play The Time of Your Life was revived on March 17, 1972, at the Huntington Hartford Theater in Los Angeles with Martin, Henry Fonda, Richard Dreyfuss, Gloria Grahame, Lewis J. Stadlen, Ron Thompson, Jane Alexander, Richard X. Slattery, and Pepper Martin among the cast with Edwin Sherin directing.

Martin appeared in all three of the classic Westerns released in 1969: Sam Peckinpah's The Wild Bunch (as Coffer, a bloodthirsty bounty hunter), George Roy Hill's Butch Cassidy and the Sundance Kid (as Percy Garris, the "colorful" Bolivian mine boss who hires the two title characters), and Henry Hathaway's True Grit (as Colonel Stonehill, a horse dealer). He frequently acted alongside L. Q. Jones, who in real life was one of his closest friends.

Though he usually appeared in supporting roles, he had major parts in Hannie Caulder (1971), The Brotherhood of Satan (1971), Pocket Money (1972) with Paul Newman and Lee Marvin, and in the horror film SSSSSSS (1973). Martin later appeared in another George Roy Hill film, Slap Shot (1977), again with Paul Newman, as the cheap general manager of the Charlestown Chiefs hockey club. He appeared six times each with John Wayne and Paul Newman. In an interview originally published in Movietone News in 1981, Martin commented on his professional relationship with both Wayne and Newman:

[Paul] never says so, but he cast me in Butch Cassidy. I wasn't told until during Slap Shot the director said...Back when they were getting ready to do Butch, George Roy Hill said, "I've got these three people for Percy Garris: Strother Martin..." and Paul said, "Don't go any farther." But he never mentioned that to me, he never said "I got you this job." Now if it was John Wayne [chuckles] he would have said in front of 2,000 people [drawling emphatically] "I gotcha this job!"...

Martin can also be seen in Cheech and Chong's Up in Smoke (1978) as Arnold Stoner, the father of Tommy Chong's character Anthony.

Martin made many guest appearances on Gunsmoke including the two-part episode "Island in the Desert", in which he portrayed a crazy desert hermit named Ben Snow. Previously, he guest-starred as Marv Rowley in the 1961 Gunsmoke episode "Tall Trapper" playing an angry man who murders his wife out of jealousy then tries to pin the killing on a quiet, respectful trapper who his wife fell for.

He also made many guest appearances on Perry Mason throughout the nine-year run from 1957 to 1966, including a horseman in the 1962 episode "The Case of the Fickle Filly", a college employee in "The Case of the Brazen Bequest", and as Gerald Sommers in "The Case of the Drowsy Mosquito". In 1963, he appeared in Glynis Johns' short-lived comedy series Glynis in the episode "Ten Cents a Dance". In 1965, Martin appeared in the episode "Most Precious Gold" of the NBC comedy/drama series Kentucky Jones, starring Dennis Weaver. In 1965, he guest-starred as Meeker in the episode "Return to Lawrence" on the ABC Western The Legend of Jesse James. In 1966, he guest-starred in the Lost In Space episode "Blast Off Into Space" as a gritty mining engineer named Nerim. On a Gilligan's Island episode, Martin played a man living supposedly alone on the island for a radio show contest. In 1973–1974, he was a regular cast member of the James Stewart legal drama and murder mystery series Hawkins. He also starred in a two-part The Rockford Files 1977 episode as T.T. Flowers "The Trees, the Bees and T. T. Flowers", an episode that took on urban invasion and the environment.

One of his last acting jobs was as host of Saturday Night Live on April 19, 1980. In one of the skits, Martin played the strict owner of a French language camp for children, based on his role as the prison captain from Cool Hand Luke. He even paraphrased his most famous line from the film, "What we have here is failure to communicate BILINGUALLY!" In another, he played a terminally ill man who videotaped his last will and testament. During his monologue, he again did his Tennessee Williams impression. The episode was supposed to be rerun during the summer of 1980, but it was pulled and replaced with another episode due to Martin's death.

== Personal life ==
Martin was married to Helen Meisels-Martin from 1967 until his death; they had no children.

=== Illness and death ===
In the last few years of his life, Martin was under a doctor's care for diabetes and cardiac problems. After attending a dinner at a Beverly Hills hotel, he awoke early the next morning (August 1, 1980) at his home in Agoura, California, with chest pains and died of a heart attack at age 61 at Los Robles Regional Medical Center in Thousand Oaks, California.

== Filmography ==
=== Film ===
- The Damned Don't Cry (1950) as Springboard Diver (uncredited)
- The Asphalt Jungle (1950) as William Doldy (uncredited)
- Rhubarb (1951) as Michael 'Shorty' McGirk (uncredited)
- The Red Badge of Courage (1951) as Corporal (voice, uncredited)
- Scandal Sheet (1952) as Man on Crutches (uncredited)
- Storm Over Tibet (1952) as Co-Pilot
- Androcles and the Lion (1952) as Soldier (uncredited)
- The Magnetic Monster (1953) as Co-Pilot
- South Sea Woman (1953) as Marine in Audience at Court Martial (uncredited)
- World for Ransom (1954) as Corporal (uncredited)
- Prisoner of War (1954) as Man on Crutches (uncredited)
- A Star is Born (1954) as Delivery Boy (uncredited)
- Drum Beat (1954) as Scotty
- The Silver Chalice (1954) as Father (uncredited)
- Strategic Air Command (1955) as Airman (uncredited)
- Kiss Me Deadly (1955) as Harvey Wallace
- The Big Knife (1955) as Stillman (uncredited)
- Target Zero (1955) as Private Dan O'Hirons (uncredited)
- World Without End (1956) as Nihka (uncredited)
- Johnny Concho (1956) as Townsman (uncredited)
- Attack! (1956) as Sergeant Ingersol
- The Black Whip (1956) as Thorney
- Copper Sky (1957) as Pokey
- Black Patch (1957) as Deputy Petey Walker
- Cowboy (1958) as Cowboy Bitten by Snake (uncredited)
- The Shaggy Dog (1959) as Thurm
- The Wild and the Innocent (1959) as Ben Stocker
- The Horse Soldiers (1959) as Virgil
- Sanctuary (1961) as Dog Boy
- The Deadly Companions (1961) as Parson
- The Man Who Shot Liberty Valance (1962) as Floyd
- Showdown (1963) as Charlie Reeder
- McLintock! (1963) as Agard (Indian Agent)
- Invitation to a Gunfighter (1964) as Fiddler
- Brainstorm (1965) as Mr. Clyde
- Shenandoah (1965) as Train Engineer
- The Sons of Katie Elder (1965) as Jeb Ross
- Harper (1966) as Claude
- Nevada Smith (1966) as Strother (uncredited)
- An Eye for an Eye (1966) as Trumbull
- The Flim-Flam Man (1967) as Lovick
- Cool Hand Luke (1967) as The Captain
- True Grit (1969) as Colonel G. Stonehill
- The Wild Bunch (1969) as Jack Coffer
- Butch Cassidy and the Sundance Kid (1969) as Percy Garris
- The Ballad of Cable Hogue (1970) as Bowen
- Red Sky at Morning (1971) as John Cloyd
- The Brotherhood of Satan (1971) as Doc Duncan
- Fools' Parade (1971) as Lee Cotrill
- Hannie Caulder (1971) as Rufus Clemens
- Pocket Money (1972) as Bill Garrett
- Sssssss (1973) as Dr. Carl Stoner
- Hard Times (1975) as Poe
- Rooster Cogburn (1975) as Shanghai McCoy
- The Great Scout & Cathouse Thursday (1976) as Billy
- Slap Shot (1977) as Joe McGrath
- The End (1978) as Dr. Waldo Kling
- Up in Smoke (1978) as Arnold Stoner
- Love and Bullets (1979) as Louis Monk
- The Champ (1979) as Riley
- Nightwing (1979) as Selwyn
- The Villain (1979) as Parody Jones
- The Secret of Nikola Tesla (1980) as George Westinghouse
- Hotwire (1980) as The Weasel (final film role)

=== Television ===
- Dangerous Assignment – episode – The Venetian Story – Riri (1952)
- Gunsmoke – episode – Professor Lute Bone (1956)
- Gunsmoke – episode – Cooter- Cooter (1956)
- I Love Lucy – episode – Off To Florida – Coffee Shop Clerk (1956)
- Zane Grey Theater – episode – The Necessary Breed – Telegraph Clerk, Joby (1957)
- Have Gun - Will Travel – episode – A Matter of Ethics – Fred Coombs (1957)
- Gunsmoke – episode – “Liar From Blackhawk” - Ed Davey (1957)
- Have Gun - Will Travel – episode – High Wire – Dooley Delaware (1957)
- The Grey Ghost – episode – Reconnaissance Mission – Michael (1957)
- The Walter Winchell File – Little Jules – "Exclusive Story" (1958)
- Gunsmoke – episode – Dooley Surrenders – Emmett Dooley (1958)
- Trackdown – episode – A Stone for Benny French – Benny French (1958)
- The Rebel – episode – Johnny Yuma – Jess (1959)
- Have Gun - Will Travel – episode – One Came Back – Carew (1959)
- Whirlybirds – episode – Without a Net – The Great Herman (1959)
- Rawhide (1959) – Meeker in S2:E8, "Incident of the Haunted Hills"
- The Twilight Zone – episode – "The Grave" – Mothershed (1961)
- Gunsmoke – episode – Tall Trapper – Marv Rowley (1961)
- Gunsmoke – episode – The Trappers – Beaver skin trapper Billy (1962)
- Have Gun - Will Travel – episode "Lazarus" – Boise Peabody (1962)
- Perry Mason – episode – The case of the Fickle Filly – Joe Mead (1962)
- Perry Mason – episode – The Case of the Brazen Bequest – Pete Gibson (1962)
- Perry Mason – episode – The Case of the Drowsy Mosquito – Gerald Sommers (1963)
- Perry Mason – episode – The Case of the Hasty Honeymooner – Roy Hutchison (1965)
- The Fugitive – episode – Devil's Carnival – Deputy Shirky Saulter (1964)
- Bonanza – episode – The Saga of Muley Jones – Yuri (1964)
- Gunsmoke – episode – No Hands – Will Timble – S.9 E.19 (1964)
- Rawhide (1965) – Bates in S7:E30, "The Gray Rock Hotel"
- Perry Mason – episode – The Case of the Hasty Honeymooner – Roy Hutchinson (1965)
- The Dick Van Dyke Show – episode – Baby Fat – Harper Worthington Yates (1965)
- Bonanza – episode – The Meredith Smith – Little Meredith Smith (1965)
- Kentucky Jones – episode – Most Precious Gold – Boney Benton (1965)
- The Virginian – episode – The Claim – Finley (1965)
- Death Valley Days – episode The Four Dollar Law Suit – Alfred Hall (1966)
- Lost in Space – episode – Blast Off Into Space – Nerim (1966)
- The Big Valley - episode - Target - Dan'l Hawks (1966)
- Death Valley Days – episode – Silver Tombstone – Ed Schieffelin (1967)
- The Guns of Will Sonnet – episode – Message at Noon – Harvey Bains (1967)
- Gilligan's Island – episode – Take A Dare – George Barkley (1967)
- The Big Valley – episode – Brother Love – Fludd (1967)
- The Invaders – episode – Moonshot – Charlie Coogan (1967)
- Gentle Ben – episode – The Opportunist – Reed Olmstock (1967)
- The Guns of Will Sonnet – episode – Joby – Joby (1968)
- It Takes a Thief – episode – Birds of a Feather – Paul Rooney (1968)
- Daniel Boone – episode – The Terrible Tarbots – Tarbot (1969)
- Bonanza – episode – The Silence at Stillwater – Lonnie Stern (1969)
- The Virginian – episode – You Can Lead A Horse To Water – Luther Watson (1970)
- Marcus Welby, M.D. – episode – Nobody Wants a Fat Jockey – Terry Riggs (1970)
- Bonanza – episode – The Imposters – Joad Bruder (1970)
- Bonanza – episode – The Younger Brothers' Younger Brother – Cole Younger (1972)
- Walt Disney's Wonderful World of Color – episodes – The Boy and the Bronc Busters: Parts 1 and 2 (1973)
- Hawkins – 8 episodes (series regular) – R. J. Hawkins (1973–1974)
- Gunsmoke – episode – Island in the Desert: Part 1 and Part 2 – Hermit Ben Snow (1974)
- Movin' On – episode – Long Way to Nowhere – Cabe Miller (1975)
- The Rockford Files – episodes – The Trees, the Bees and T.T. Flowers – Thomas Tyler "T.T" Flowers (1977)
- Vega$ – episode – Yes, My Darling Daughter – Hank Jenner (1978)
- Saturday Night Live – episode – Strother Martin – host (1980)
