= Harrisburg 19th Street Armory =

- U.S. National Register of Historic Places
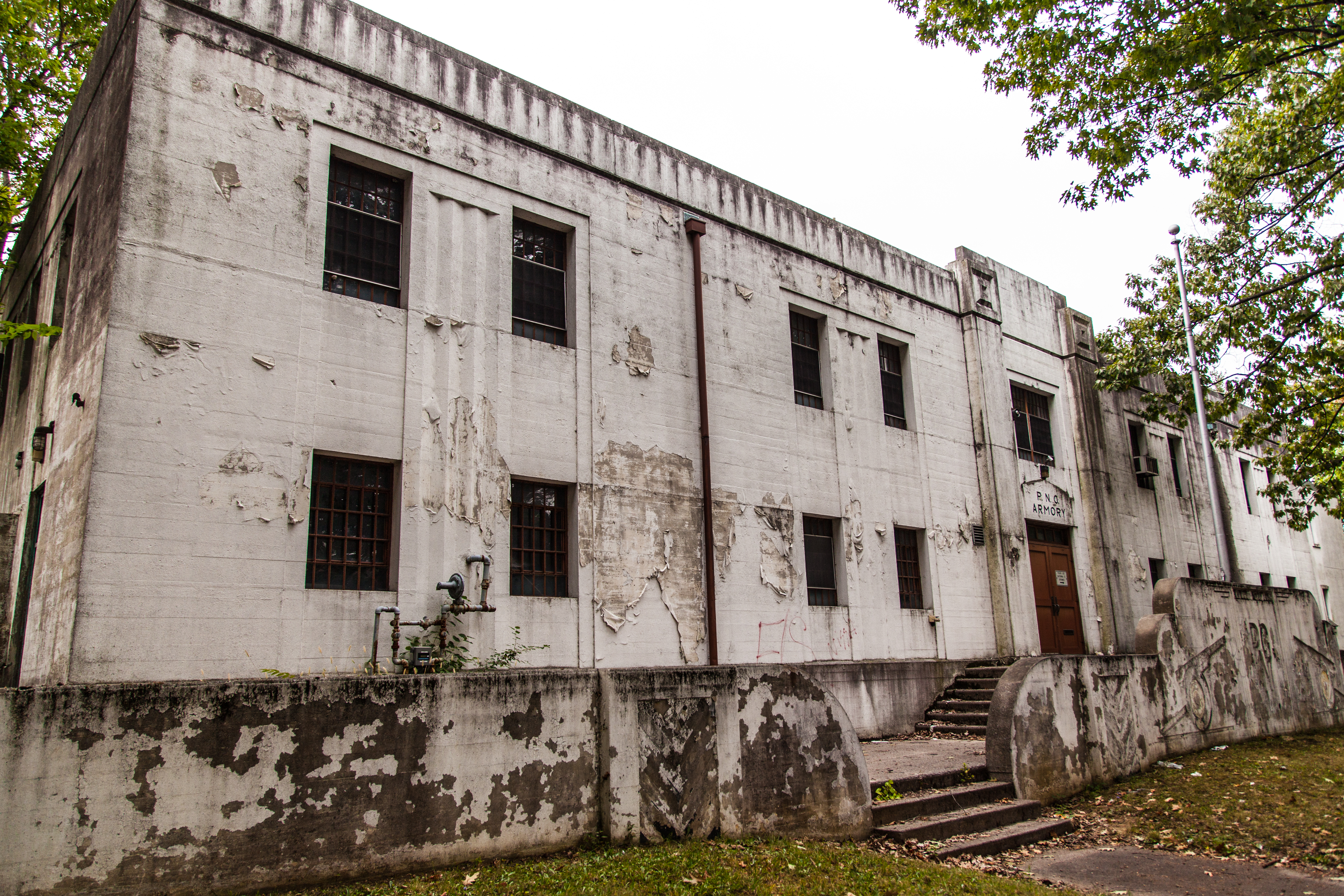
- Front of the armory

- Location within Pennsylvania Location within the United States
- Location: 1313 S. 19th St., Harrisburg, Pennsylvania
- Coordinates: 40°15′2″N 76°51′9″W
- Area: 0.5 acres (0.20 ha)
- Built: 1938
- Built by: Carl J. Schmitt & Son
- Architect: Edmund George Good
- Architectural style: Moderne
- MPS: Pennsylvania National Guard Armories MPS
- NRHP reference No.: 91001696
- Added to NRHP: November 14, 1991

The Harrisburg 19th Street Armory is an historic, United States National Guard armory that is located in Harrisburg, Dauphin County, Pennsylvania.

It was added to the National Register of Historic Places in 1991.

== History and architectural features ==
Built in 1938, this historic structure is a two-story, stucco-coated, concrete building that was designed in the Moderne style. It has a modified T-plan, with administrative rooms and garage located on the first floor and drill hall placed above. An L-shaped addition dates to 1974. A notable feature is its decorative exterior, including a parapet, recessed window panels, and a distinctive front wall adorned with chevrons, cannons, and "PNG" initials. Since 2003, it has been owned by the City of Harrisburg and is currently in use as vehicle storage for the Department of Planning & Engineering.
