= Lykens, Pennsylvania =

Borough in Pennsylvania, US

- Borough
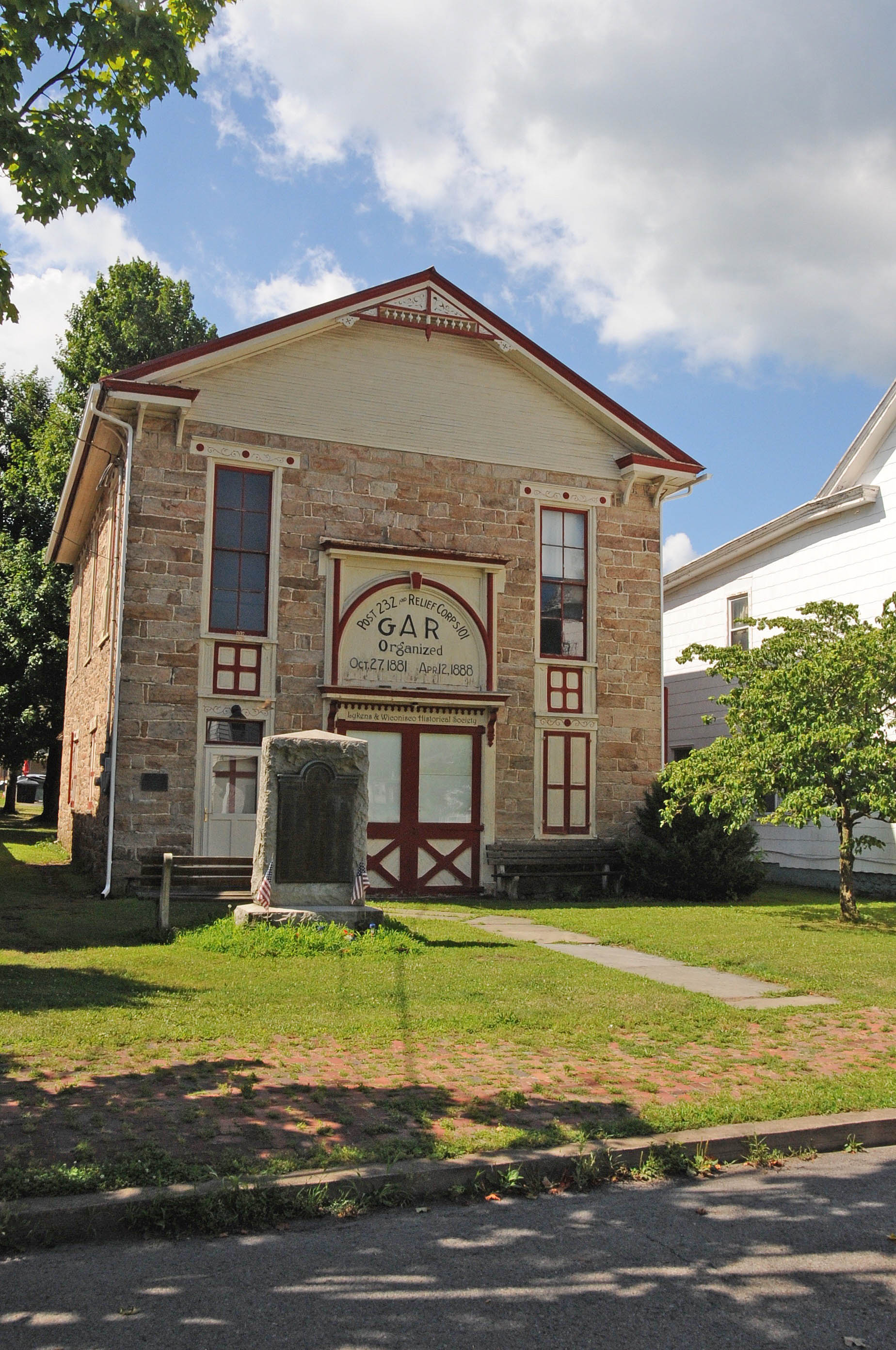

- Location in Dauphin County and the U.S. state of Pennsylvania.

- Location in Pennsylvania and the United States Lykens (the United States)
- Coordinates: 40°34′01″N 76°42′09″W
- Country: United States
- State: Pennsylvania
- County: Dauphin
- Settled: 1848
- Incorporated: 1872

Government
  - Type: Borough Council

Area
  - Total: 1.22 sq mi (3.16 km^{2})
  - Land: 1.22 sq mi (3.16 km^{2})
  - Water: 0 sq mi (0.00 km^{2})
- Elevation: 705 ft (215 m)

Population (2020)
  - Total: 1,873
  - Density: 1,535.7/sq mi (592.95/km^{2})
- Time zone: UTC-5 (Eastern (EST))
  - Summer (DST): UTC-4 (EDT)
- ZIP Code: 17048
- Area code: 717
- FIPS code: 42-45592
- Website: www.lykenspa.com

Lykens is a borough in Dauphin County, Pennsylvania, United States. Anthracite coal mining sustained a population of 2,762 in 1900 and 2,943 in 1910. The population was 1,865 at the 2020 census.

Lykens is part of the Harrisburg–Carlisle Metropolitan Statistical Area.

== History ==
Lykens was laid out in 1848. The borough was named after the first European settler and pioneer Andrew Lycan who came from Berks, Pennsylvania in 1731. Lykens is the grandson of Swedish immigrant Peter Nilsson Lyckan.

The GAR Building was listed on the National Register of Historic Places in 1986.

== Geography ==
Lykens is located in northeastern Dauphin County at 40°34′01″N 76°42′09″W, in the valley of Wiconisco Creek, between Short Mountain and Big Lick Mountain to the north, and Berry Mountain to the south. U.S. Route 209 passes through the borough, leading northeast 29 miles (47 km) to Pottsville and west 14 miles (23 km) to Millersburg on the Susquehanna River.

According to the United States Census Bureau, the borough has a total area of 1.2 square miles (3.2 km^{2}), all land.

== Demographics ==
Historical population
Census	Pop.	Note	%±
1880	2,154		—
1890	2,450		13.7%
1900	2,762		12.7%
1910	2,943		6.6%
1920	2,880		−2.1%
1930	3,033		5.3%
1940	3,048		0.5%
1950	2,735		−10.3%
1960	2,527		−7.6%
1970	2,506		−0.8%
1980	2,181		−13.0%
1990	1,986		−8.9%
2000	1,937		−2.5%
2010	1,779		−8.2%
2020	1,873		5.3%
2021 (est.)	1,860	▼	−0.7%

As of the census of 2000, there were 1,937 people, 810 households, and 528 families residing in the borough. The population density was 1,450.5 inhabitants per square mile (560.0/km^{2}). There were 925 housing units at an average density of 692.7 per square mile (267.5/km^{2}). The racial makeup of the borough was 97.47% White, 0.36% African American, 0.21% Native American, 0.77% Asian, 0.15% from other races, and 1.03% from two or more races. Hispanic or Latino of any race were 0.52% of the population.

There were 810 households, out of which 27.8% had children under the age of 18 living with them, 50.1% were married couples living together, 9.1% had a female householder with no husband present, and 34.8% were non-families. 29.9% of all households were made up of individuals, and 17.7% had someone living alone who was 65 years of age or older. The average household size was 2.39, and the average family size was 2.96.

In the borough, the population was spread out, with 23.3% under the age of 18, 7.2% from 18 to 24, 27.5% from 25 to 44, 20.9% from 45 to 64, and 21.1% who were 65 years of age or older. The median age was 40 years. For every 100 females, there were 94.9 males. For every 100 females age 18 and over, there were 94.6 males.

The median income for a household in the borough was $33,846, and the median income for a family was $40,909. Males had a median income of $31,774 versus $23,477 for females. The per capita income for the borough was $17,459. About 6.2% of families and 8.3% of the population were below the poverty line, including 10.4% of those under age 18 and 10.7% of those age 65 or over.
