= GAR Building (Lykens, Pennsylvania) =

- U.S. National Register of Historic Places
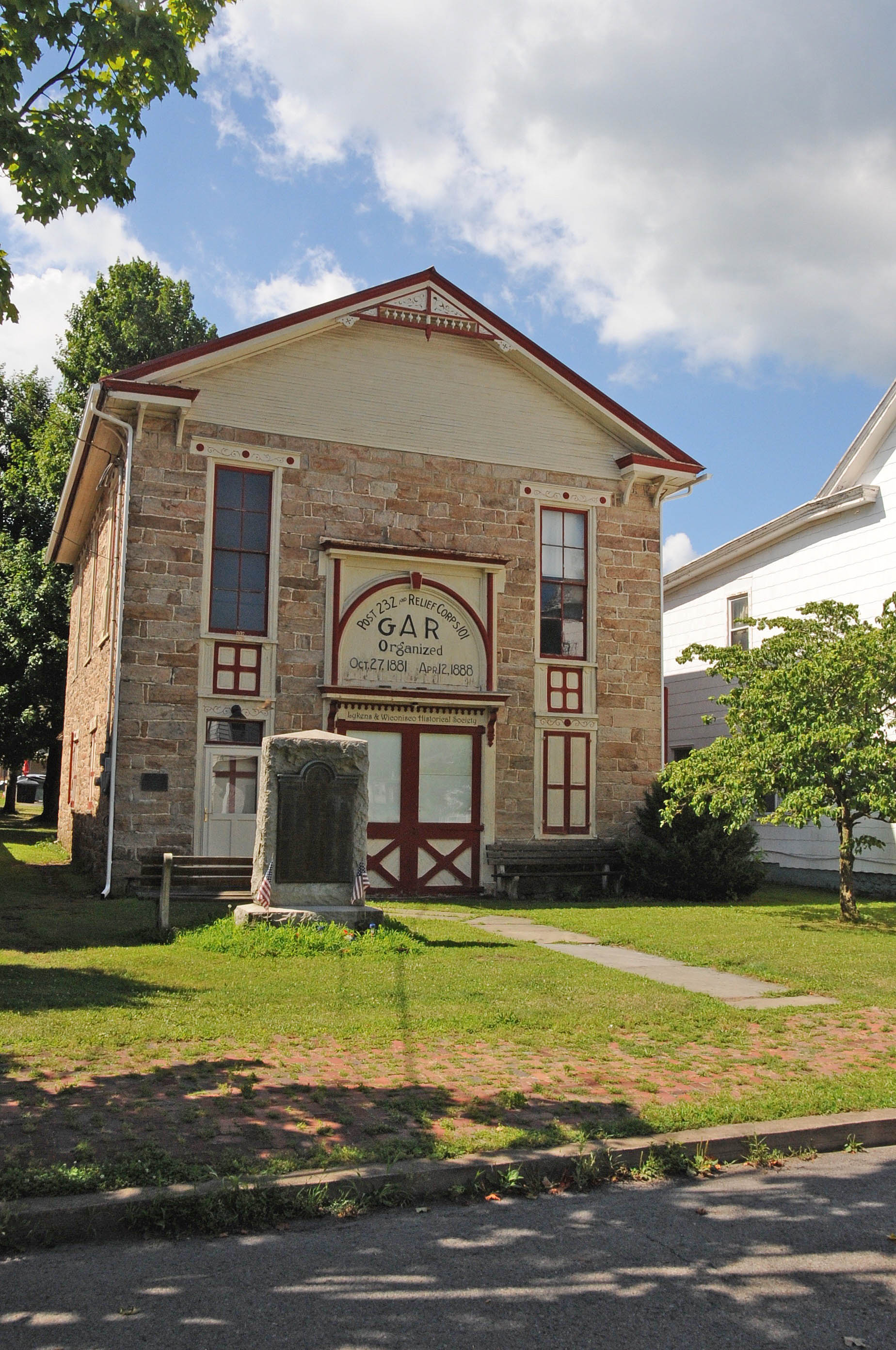

- Location within Pennsylvania Location within the United States
- Location: 626-628 N. Second St., Lykens, Pennsylvania
- Coordinates: 40°34′4″N 76°42′1″W
- Area: 0.5 acres (0.20 ha)
- Built: 1850-1852
- Architect: Nolen, Richard
- NRHP reference No.: 86003453
- Added to NRHP: November 5, 1986

GAR Building is a historic fraternal building located at Lykens, Dauphin County, Pennsylvania, United States. It was built between 1850 and 1852, and is a two-story, gray limestone building with a gable roof. It features an ornamental front entry. It originally housed a church. From 1867 to 1887, it was a private residence. It then housed an armory from 1888 to 1890, a fire company from 1890 to 1898, when it was purchased by the local chapter of the Grand Army of the Republic (GAR). The GAR and Women's Auxiliary occupied the building until 1973, when it was "sold" to the Lykens Borough.

It was added to the National Register of Historic Places in 1986.
