= Lykens Township, Pennsylvania =

Township in Pennsylvania, US

Coordinates: 40°36′00″N 76°45′59″W

- Township
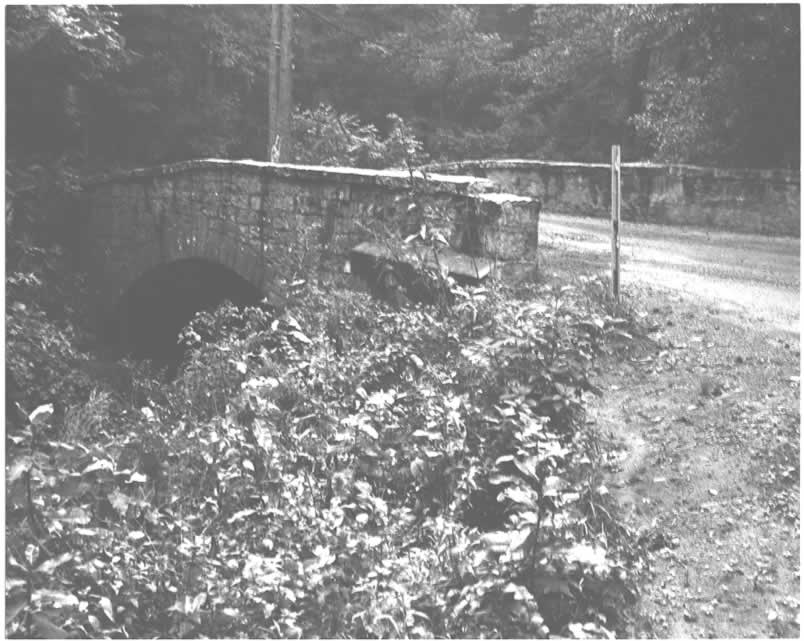
- Pine Creek bridge, built 1872

- Location in Dauphin County and state of Pennsylvania
- Country: United States
- State: Pennsylvania
- County: Dauphin
- Settled: 1732
- Incorporated: 1810

Area
  - Total: 26.48 sq mi (68.59 km^{2})
  - Land: 26.48 sq mi (68.57 km^{2})
  - Water: 0.0077 sq mi (0.02 km^{2})

Population (2020)
  - Total: 1,561 ▼
  - Estimate (2023): 1,580
  - Density: 62.0/sq mi (23.93/km^{2})
- Time zone: UTC-5 (Eastern (EST))
  - Summer (DST): UTC-4 (EDT)
- Area code: 717
- FIPS code: 42-043-45600
- Website: lykenstownship.com

Lykens Township is a township which is located in Dauphin County, Pennsylvania, United States. The population was 1,561 at the time of the 2020 census, a decline from the figure of 1,618 tabulated in 2010.

== History ==
The Bridge in Lykens Township No. 1 and Bridge in Lykens Township No. 2 were listed on the National Register of Historic Places in 1988. The township was named after pioneer Peter Nilsson Lyckan and brother Mikel, who immigrated from Sweden in 1654, and was the first European settler on the township's land in the 1670s. The property was adjacent to his nephew's Mans Jones.

== Geography ==
Lykens Township occupies the northeastern corner of Dauphin County, bordered by Northumberland County to the north and Schuylkill County to the east. The borough of Gratz, a separate municipality, is located south of the township center and is entirely surrounded by the township. Mahantango Creek, a westward-flowing tributary of the Susquehanna River, forms the northern border of the township. Mahantango Mountain is a long ridge that crosses the northern length of the township south of Mahantango Creek. The southern border of the township runs along the ridge of Short Mountain/Bear Mountain, though not directly following the ridgecrest.

Pennsylvania Route 25 runs east–west through the township and passes through the center of Gratz.

According to the United States Census Bureau, the township has a total area of 26.5 square miles (68.6 km^{2}), of which 0.01 square miles (0.02 km^{2}), or 0.03%, is water.

== Demographics ==
Historical population
Census	Pop.	Note	%±
2010	1,618		—
2020	1,561		−3.5%
2023 (est.)	1,580		1.2%
U.S. Decennial Census

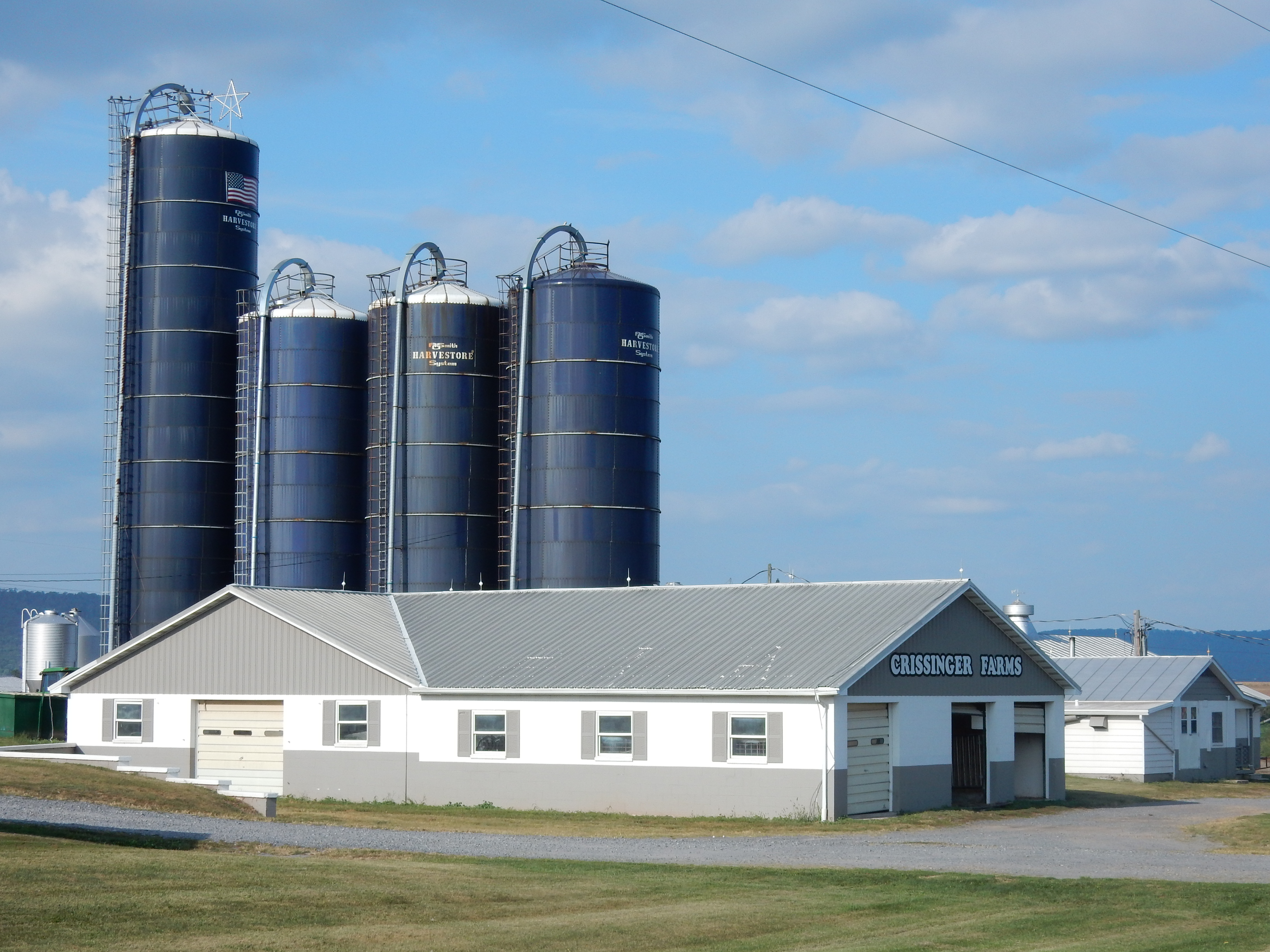
Crissinger Farms in Lykens Twp.

As of the census of 2000, there were 1,095 people, 356 households, and 292 families residing in the township. The population density was 41.5 inhabitants per square mile (16.0/km^{2}). There were 371 housing units at an average density of 14.1/sq mi (5.4/km^{2}). The racial makeup of the township was 99.09% White, 0.27% African American, and 0.64% from two or more races.

There were 356 households, out of which 37.9% had children under the age of 18 living with them, 74.7% were married couples living together, 3.9% had a female householder with no husband present, and 17.7% were non-families. 14.3% of all households were made up of individuals, and 7.9% had someone living alone who was 65 years of age or older. The average household size was 3.08 and the average family size was 3.44.

In the township the population was spread out, with 29.7% under the age of 18, 8.8% from 18 to 24, 26.8% from 25 to 44, 21.8% from 45 to 64, and 12.9% who were 65 years of age or older. The median age was 34 years. For every 100 females there were 109.4 males. For every 100 females age 18 and over, there were 105.3 males.

The median income for a household in the township was $40,417, and the median income for a family was $45,156. Males had a median income of $31,172 versus $22,625 for females. The per capita income for the township was $15,096. About 4.9% of families and 7.4% of the population were below the poverty line, including 9.5% of those under age 18 and 4.5% of those age 65 or over.
