= Bridge in Lykens Township No. 1 =

- U.S. National Register of Historic Places
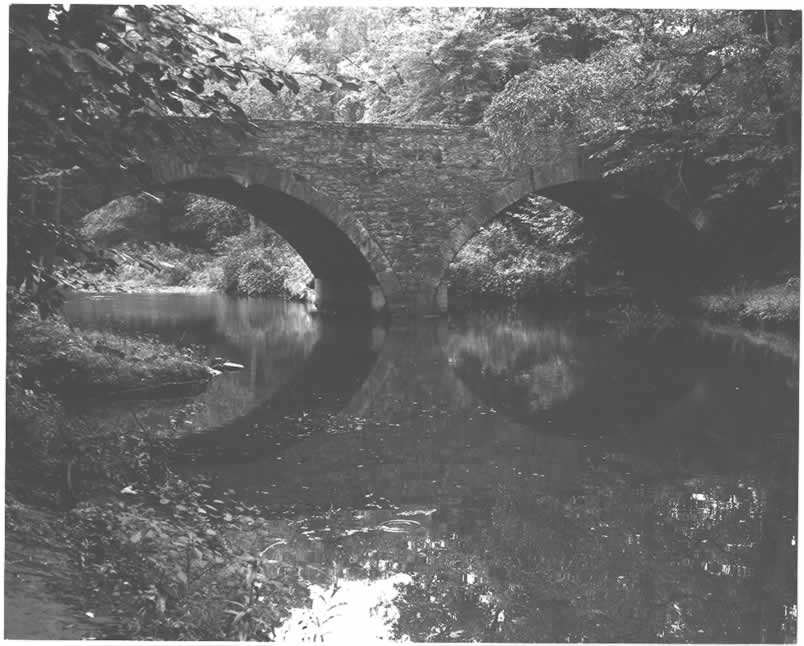
- Bridge in Lykens Township No. 1, 1982

- Location within Pennsylvania Location within the United States
- Location: Legislative Route 22001 over Pine Creek, Lykens Township, Pennsylvania
- Coordinates: 40°38′38″N 76°41′34″W
- Area: less than one acre
- Architectural style: Multi-span stone arch
- MPS: Highway Bridges Owned by the Commonwealth of Pennsylvania, Department of Transportation TR
- NRHP reference No.: 88000773
- Added to NRHP: June 22, 1988

Bridge in Lykens Township No. 1 is a historic multi-span stone arch bridge spanning Pine Creek at Lykens Township, Dauphin County, Pennsylvania, United States. It has two large arches and one small arch. The property measures 127 feet long by 25 feet wide. It features a stone parapet with a concrete cap and concrete parapet.

It was added to the National Register of Historic Places in 1988.
