= Sheffield Apartments =

- U.S. National Register of Historic Places
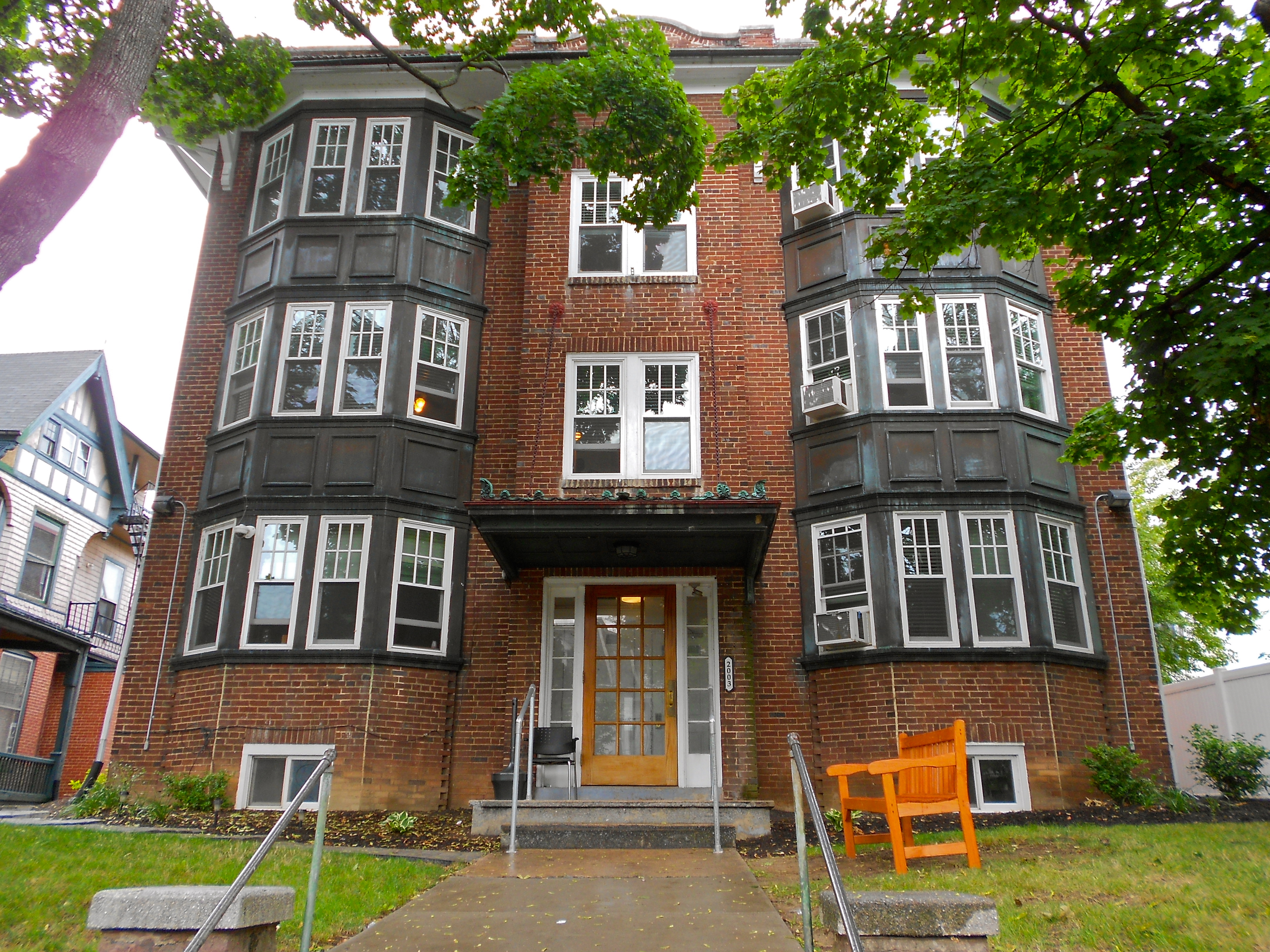
- Sheffield Apartments, August 2013

- Location within Pennsylvania Location within the United States
- Location: 2003 N. Third St., Harrisburg, Pennsylvania
- Coordinates: 40°16′40″N 76°53′42″W
- Area: less than one acre
- Built: 1925
- Built by: George Sheffer Construction Co.
- Architectural style: Mission Revival
- NRHP reference No.: 90000698
- Added to NRHP: April 26, 1990

Sheffield Apartments is a historic apartment building located at Harrisburg, Dauphin County, Pennsylvania. It was built in 1925, and is a three-story, rectangular brick building in the Mission Revival style. The facade is three bays wide, and it features three story bay windows on each side of the center entrance bay. It has 14 apartments.

It was added to the National Register of Historic Places in 1990.
