= Senate Hotel =

- Formerly listed on the U.S. National Register of Historic Places
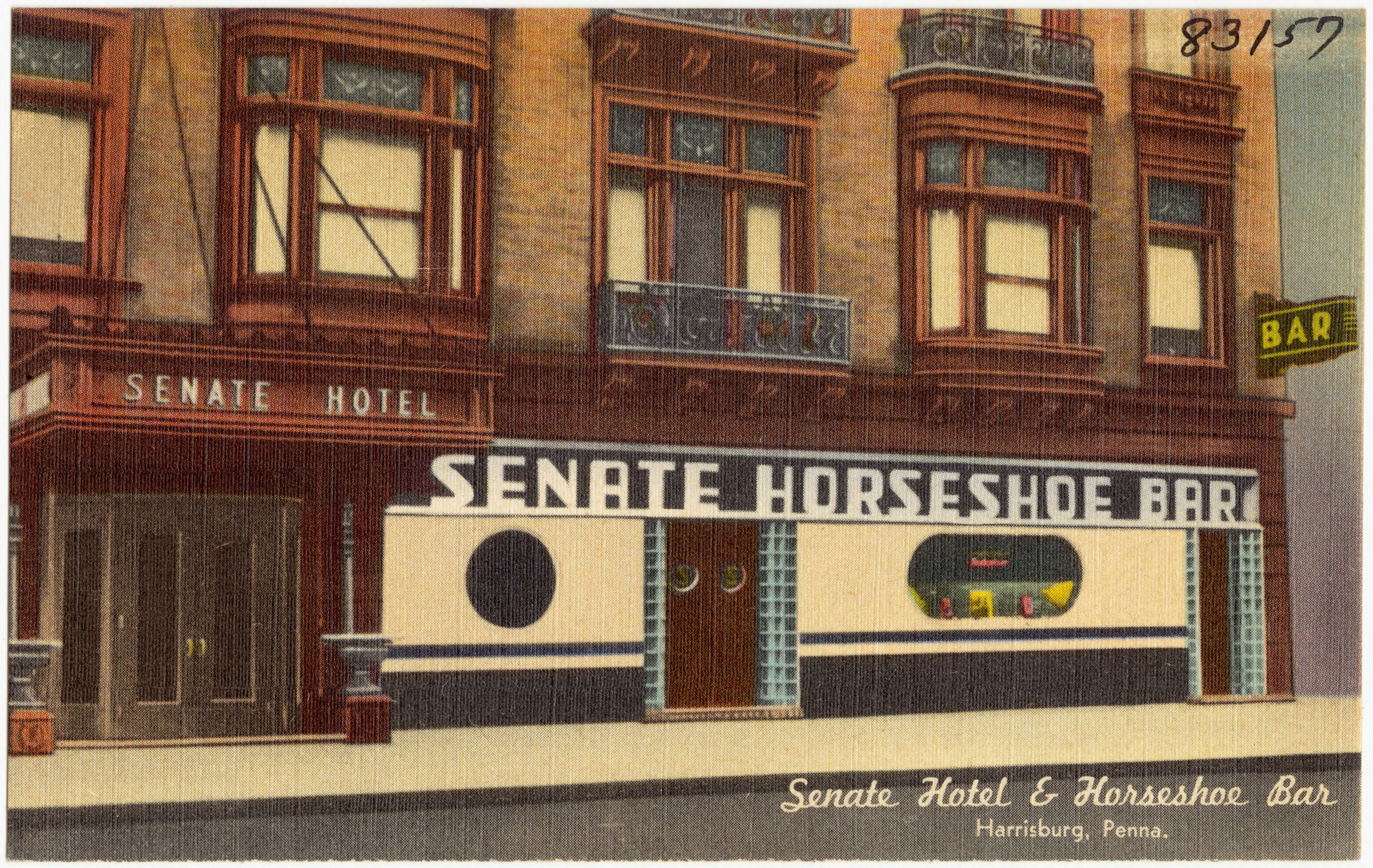
- Senate Hotel and Horseshoe Bar, between circa 1930 and circa 1945
- Location: 122 Market St., Harrisburg, Pennsylvania
- Area: 0.1 acres (0.040 ha)
- Built: 1906
- Architectural style: Second Empire
- NRHP reference No.: 82001535

Significant dates
- Added to NRHP: February 1, 1983
- Removed from NRHP: June 5, 1997

The Senate Hotel was a historic hotel located at Harrisburg, Pennsylvania. It was a brick and wood frame, six story building, completed in 1906. The building featured Second Empire-style detailing. It was demolished in February 1995.

The building was added to the National Register of Historic Places in 1983, and delisted in 1997.
