= Bridge in Lykens Township No. 2 =

- U.S. National Register of Historic Places
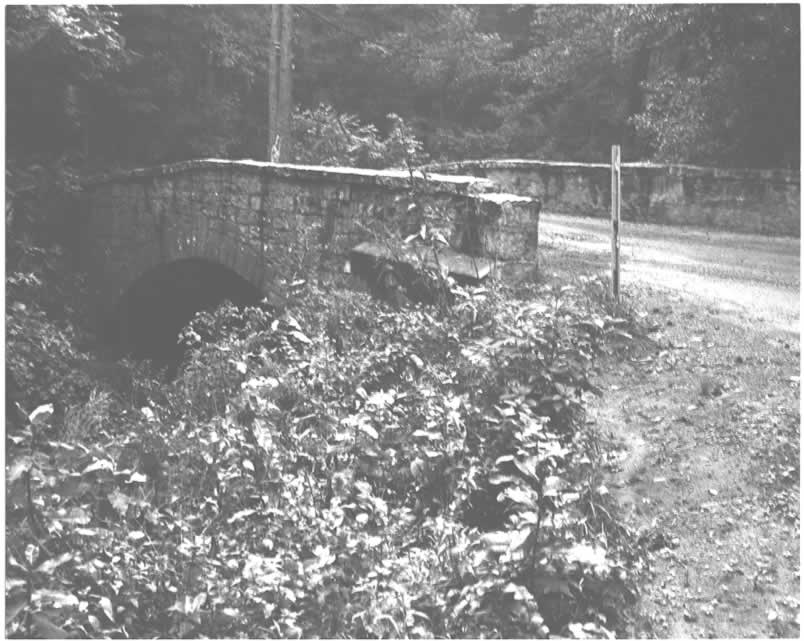
- Bridge in Lykens Township No. 2, 1982

- Location within Pennsylvania Location within the United States
- Location: Legislative Route 22033 over a tributary of Pine Creek, Lykens Township, Pennsylvania
- Coordinates: 40°37′58″N 76°39′52″W
- Area: less than one acre
- Built: 1872
- Architectural style: Single span stone arch
- MPS: Highway Bridges Owned by the Commonwealth of Pennsylvania, Department of Transportation TR
- NRHP reference No.: 88000768
- Added to NRHP: June 22, 1988

Bridge in Lykens Township No. 2 is a historic single span stone arch bridge spanning a tributary of Pine Creek at Lykens Township, Dauphin County, Pennsylvania, United States. It was built in 1872, and has a camelback shape. The property measures 25 feet long by 25 feet wide. It is built of coursed ashlar.

It was added to the National Register of Historic Places in 1988.
