= German Evangelical Zion Lutheran Church =

Historic church in Pennsylvania, United States

- U.S. National Register of Historic Places
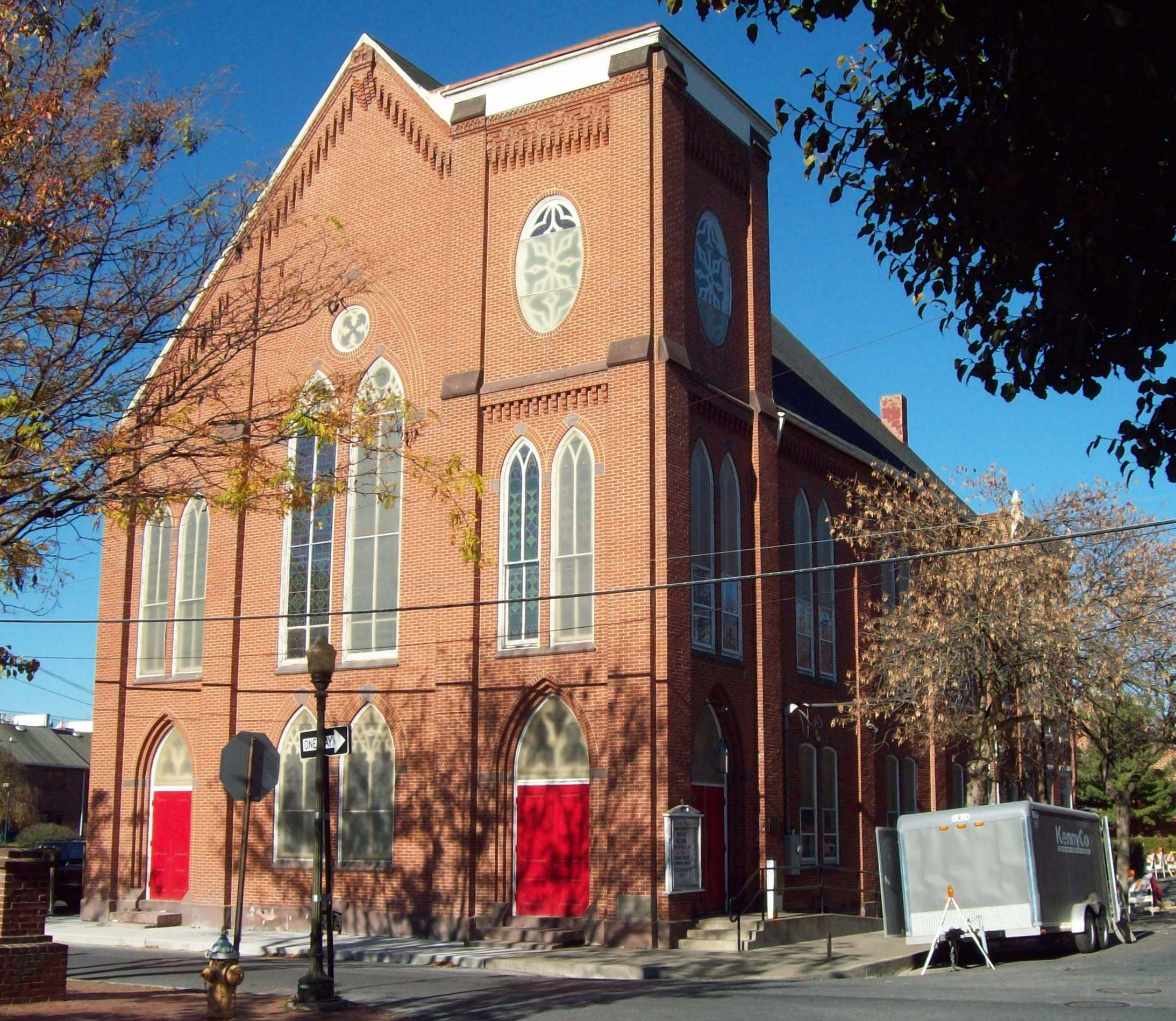
- Tabernacle Baptist Church, November 2010

- Location within Pennsylvania Location within the United States
- Location: Capital and Herr Sts., Harrisburg, Pennsylvania
- Coordinates: 40°16′3″N 76°53′9″W
- Area: 0.5 acres (0.20 ha)
- Built: 1886
- Architectural style: Gothic
- NRHP reference No.: 75001637
- Added to NRHP: November 12, 1975

www.mcchbg.org

The German Evangelical Zion Lutheran Church, which became the Tabernacle Baptist Church in 1967, is an historic Lutheran church that is located at Capital and Herr Streets in Harrisburg, Pennsylvania.

It was added to the National Register of Historic Places in 1975.

== History and architectural features ==
Built in 1886, this historic church is a two-story brick building, which was designed in a modified Gothic style. It features a three-story square bell tower with large oval windows and brick tracery.

Attached to the church by a one-bay, two-story section is a three-story brick parsonage that was built in 1897.

In November 2019, the Tabernacle Baptist parish left the church building and moved to another location. The site was briefly known as Choice Community Christian Church until March 2021 when the CCCC parish also moved to another location.To

Today, the building is used by Midtown Community Church, a group of people who want to see the weak, wounded, and wayward of Midtown encounter the living Jesus.
