= Greenawalt Building =

- Formerly listed on the U.S. National Register of Historic Places
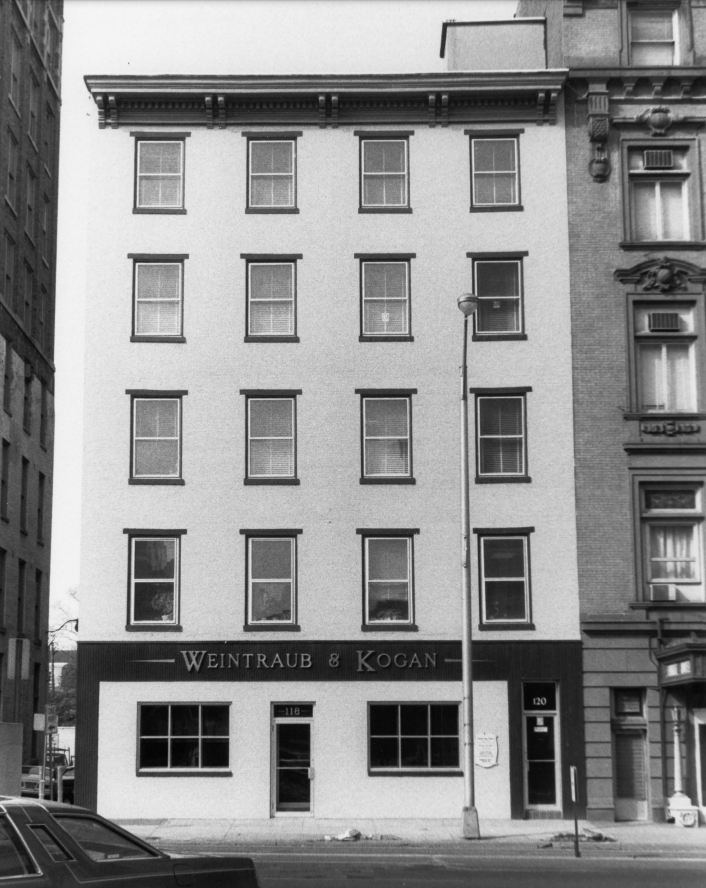
- The Greenawalt Building (under the Kogan Building name) as seen in 1982
- Location: 118-120 Market St., Harrisburg, Pennsylvania
- Area: 0.1 acres (0.040 ha)
- Built: 1863
- Architectural style: Italianate, Colonial Revival
- NRHP reference No.: 83002235

Significant dates
- Added to NRHP: February 24, 1983
- Removed from NRHP: March 10, 1998

The Greenawalt Building, also known as the Kogan Building, was a historic commercial building located in Harrisburg, Dauphin County, Pennsylvania, United States, next to Market Square. Evolving in construction but finalized in 1863, the Greenawalt Building was ultimately a five-story midrise structure that was designed in the Italianate style.

Added to the National Register of Historic Places in 1983, this building was delisted in 1998 after it was demolished.

== History and architectural features ==
Originally built in 1809, the structure consisted of two, three-story, two-bay, brick, Georgian townhouses. The two homes (118 and 120) were joined as one in 1848 by the Kelker brothers for the rise of urbanization and commercialization of Market Square.

Among its tenants were the first Harrisburg YMCA Headquarters in 1854 and the Harrisburg League of Municipal Improvements (where the City Beautiful movement was launched), until the Kelker family sold it to the Greenawalts in 1863. It was subsequently the warehouse and showroom for J & J.K. Greenawalt Tanners and Curriers, who in 1863 added two stories to the building. Their business was highly successful for decades until they finally went out of business in 1891. A piano factory and auto parts store would occupy the building through the early 20th century.

The Greenawalt Building's metamorphosis from Georgian townhouses to an Italianate early midrise commercial building demonstrates two century's differing architectural styles following Harrisburg's rise from borough to city. It was demolished along with other nearby Market Square buildings of almost two blocks (including the also NHRP-listed Senate Hotel) in 1994 to make space for the new $39 million Penn National Insurance building.

== Gallery ==
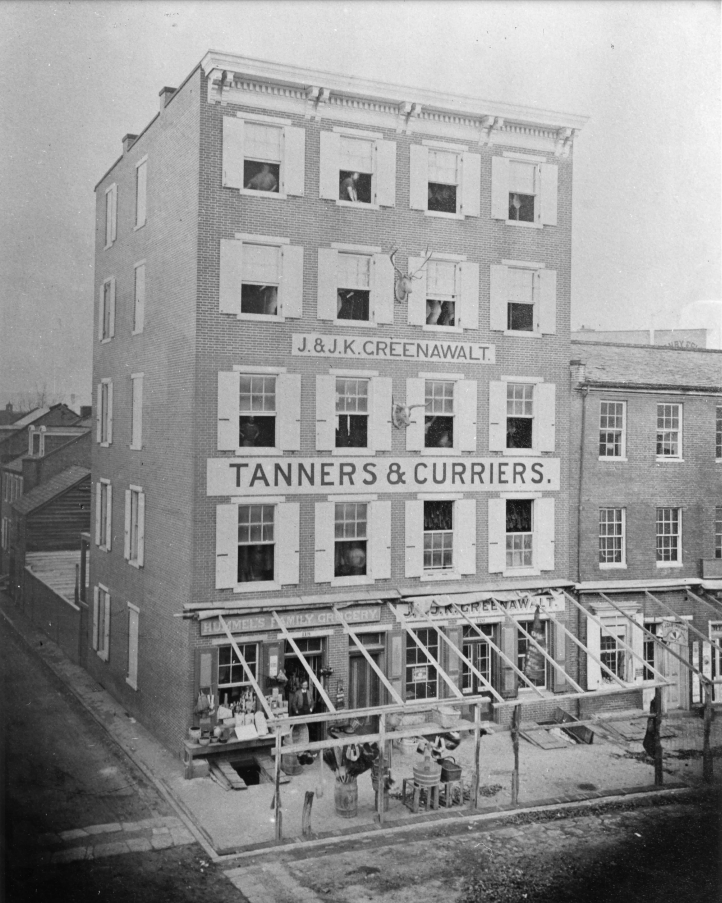
Greenawalt Brothers, pre-1891
