= Colonial Theatre (Harrisburg, Pennsylvania) =

- U.S. National Register of Historic Places
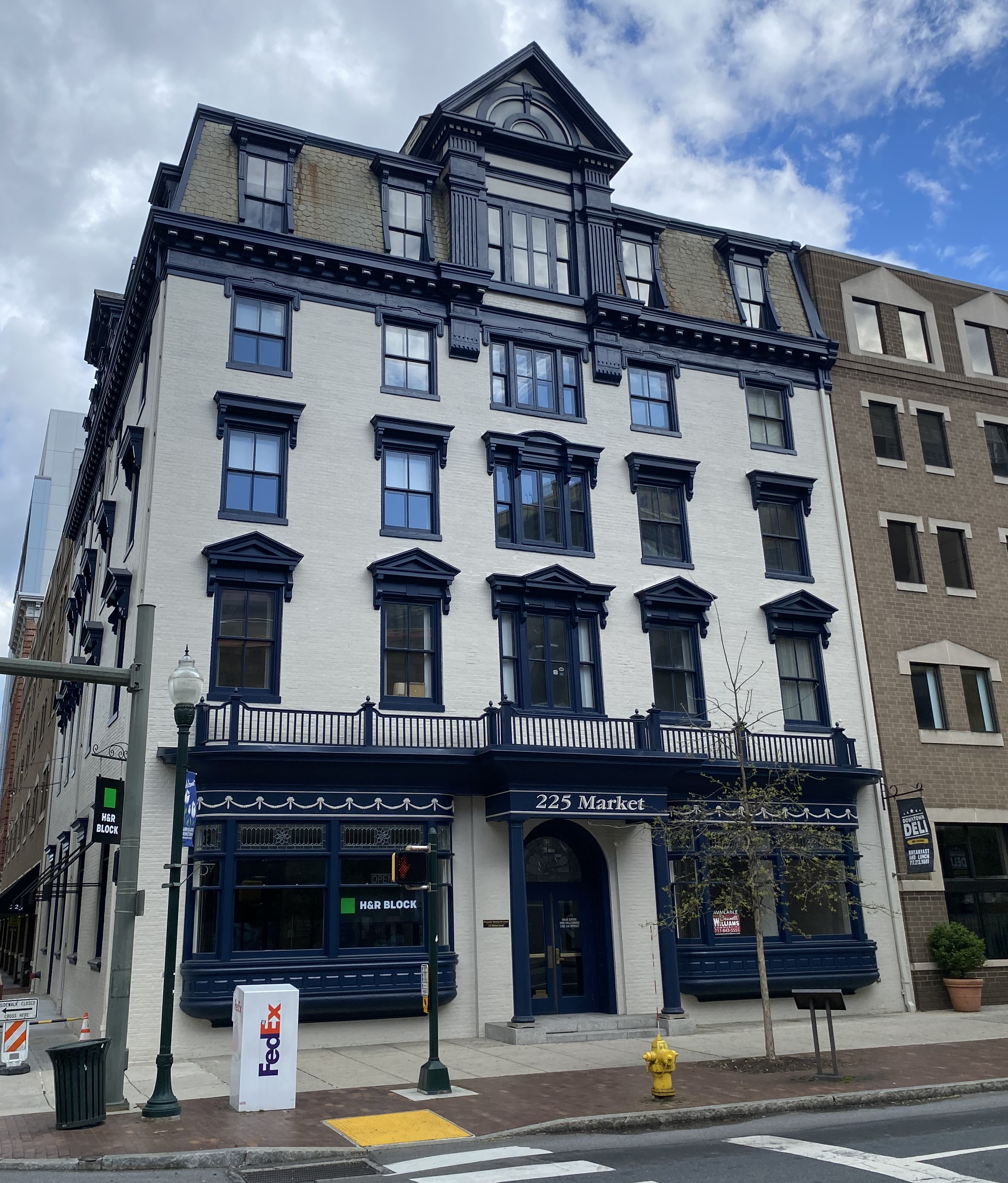
- Colonial Theatre, April 2024

- Location within Pennsylvania Location within the United States
- Location: 3rd and Market Sts., Harrisburg, Pennsylvania
- Coordinates: 40°15′38″N 76°52′52″W
- Area: 0.3 acres (0.12 ha)
- Built: 1836, 1912
- Built by: Matthew Wilson
- Architect: Fuller Claflin (1912 remodel)
- Architectural style: Greek Revival
- NRHP reference No.: 82001532
- Added to NRHP: November 9, 1982

Colonial Theatre, also known as the Lochiel Hotel, is a historic theater and commercial building located at Harrisburg, Dauphin County, Pennsylvania. The building consists of a five-story, brick and frame front section and a rear brick and frame auditorium. The original Colonial Theatre was built about 1836, as a hotel in the Greek Revival style and featured a four columned portico on the Market Street entrance. It was subsequently modified in form and use a number of times. In the 1870s, a mansard roof was added. The rear auditorium was added in 1912, when the building was converted from a hotel to hotel and movie / vaudeville theater. The lobby was remodeled in the 1930s / 1940s in an Art Deco style; the auditorium has Italian Renaissance style detailing. The theater and hotel closed in 1976, and the building used for offices and shops.

It was added to the National Register of Historic Places on November 9, 1982.

== See also ==
- National Register of Historic Places listings in Dauphin County, Pennsylvania
