= Keystone Building (Harrisburg, Pennsylvania) =

- U.S. National Register of Historic Places
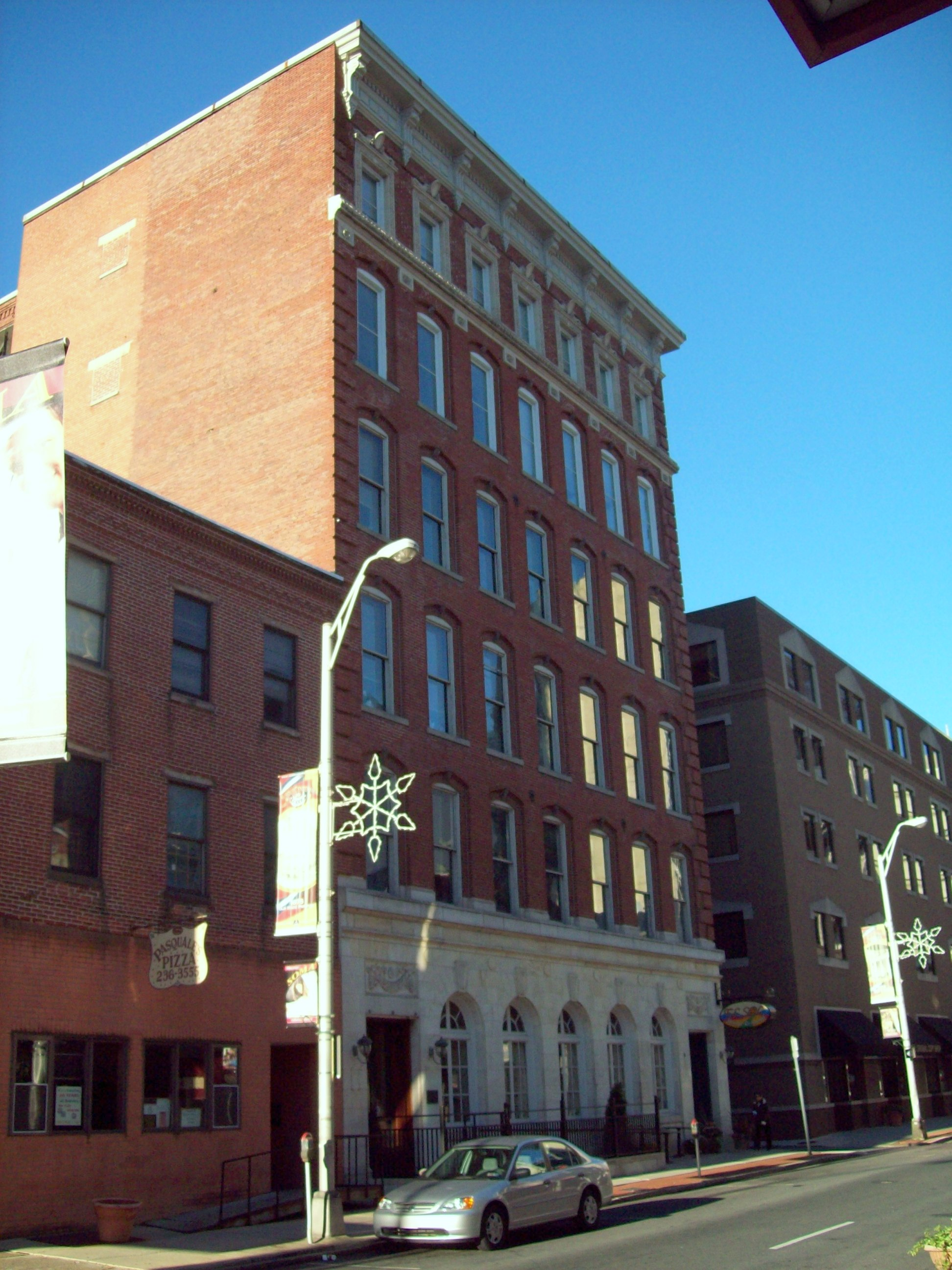
- Keystone Building, November 2010

- Location within Pennsylvania Location within the United States
- Location: 18–22 S. 3rd St, Harrisburg, Pennsylvania
- Coordinates: 40°15′37″N 76°52′49″W
- Area: 0.1 acres (0.040 ha)
- Built: 1875
- Architectural style: Late 19th And Early 20th Century American Movements
- NRHP reference No.: 79002217
- Added to NRHP: September 7, 1979

The Keystone Building is a historic, American commercial building that is located in Harrisburg, Dauphin County, Pennsylvania.

It was added to the National Register of Historic Places in 1979.

== History and architectural features ==
Built in 1875 as the State Printing Office, it is a six-story office building, plus basement that is seven bays wide and twelve bays deep. It is faced in granite on the first floor with brick above. In the late 1890s the Star-Independent newspaper moved into the building to print. Edward J. Stackpole Sr. bought out the Star-Independent in February 1917. That year it was remodeled by the Kuhn family, with the addition of a structural steel frame and twelve-inch reinforced floors. Around 1926 it was renamed the Keystone Building.
