= William Seel Building =

- U.S. National Register of Historic Places
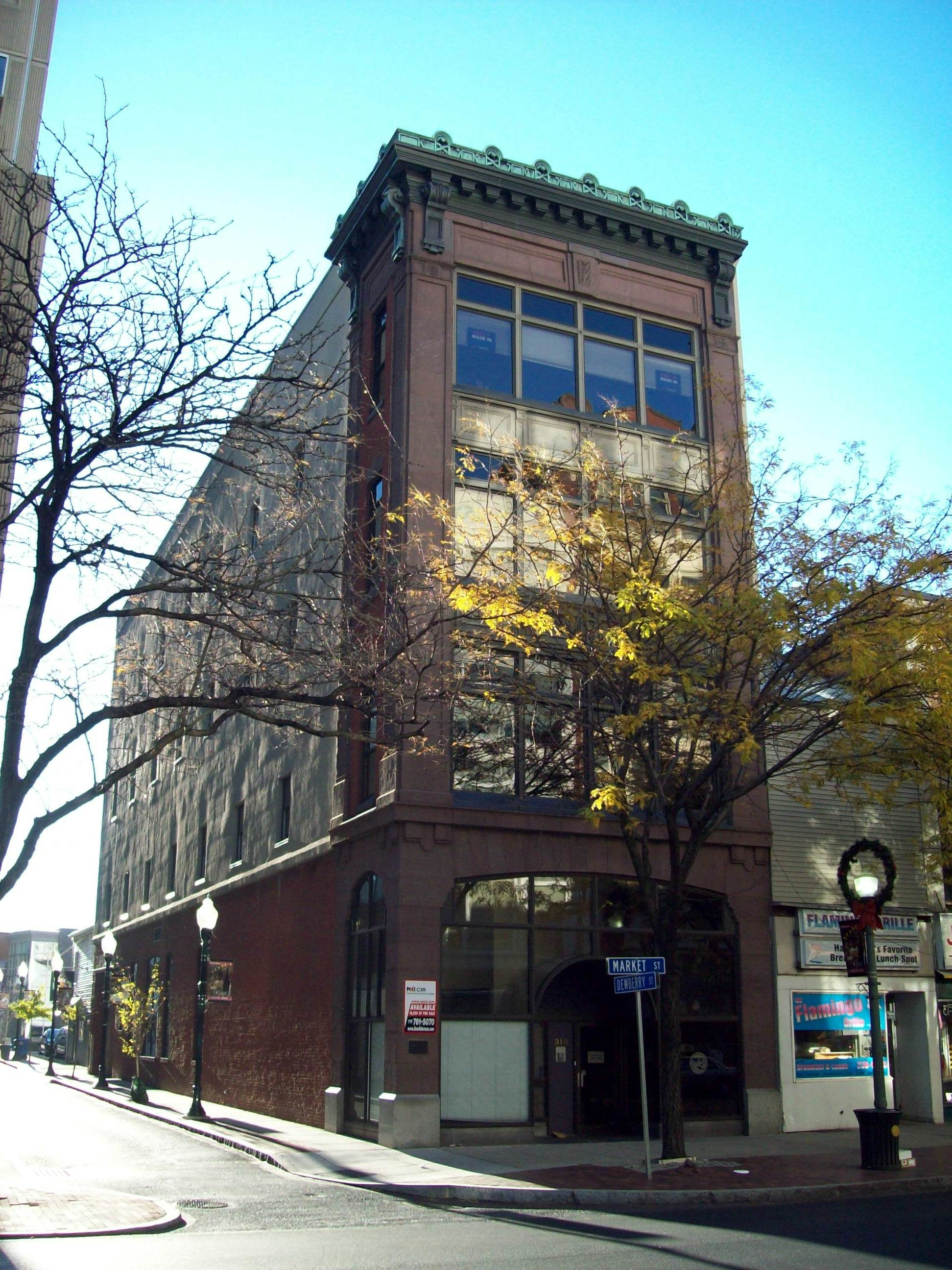
- William Seel Building, November 2010

- Location within Pennsylvania Location within the United States
- Location: 319 Market St., Harrisburg, Pennsylvania
- Coordinates: 40°15′41″N 76°52′48″W
- Area: 0.1 acres (0.040 ha)
- Built: 1912–1913
- NRHP reference No.: 80003482
- Added to NRHP: December 3, 1980

The William Seel Building is an historic commercial building that is located in Harrisburg, Dauphin County, Pennsylvania, United States.

It was added to the National Register of Historic Places in 1980.

== History and architectural features ==
Erected between 1912 and 1913 for merchant William Seel, this historic structure is a narrow four-story, four-bay-wide, office building that was built using brownstone and brick. It features two elegant arches at the first floor and an overhanging cornice. Originally the home of Waller and Seel Liquors, it was leased in 1919 to the Kinney Shoe Corporation, which operated a retail shoe business thee from 1920 until the 1970s.

It was added to the National Register of Historic Places in 1980.
