= William Donaldson House =

Historic house in Pennsylvania, United States

- U.S. National Register of Historic Places
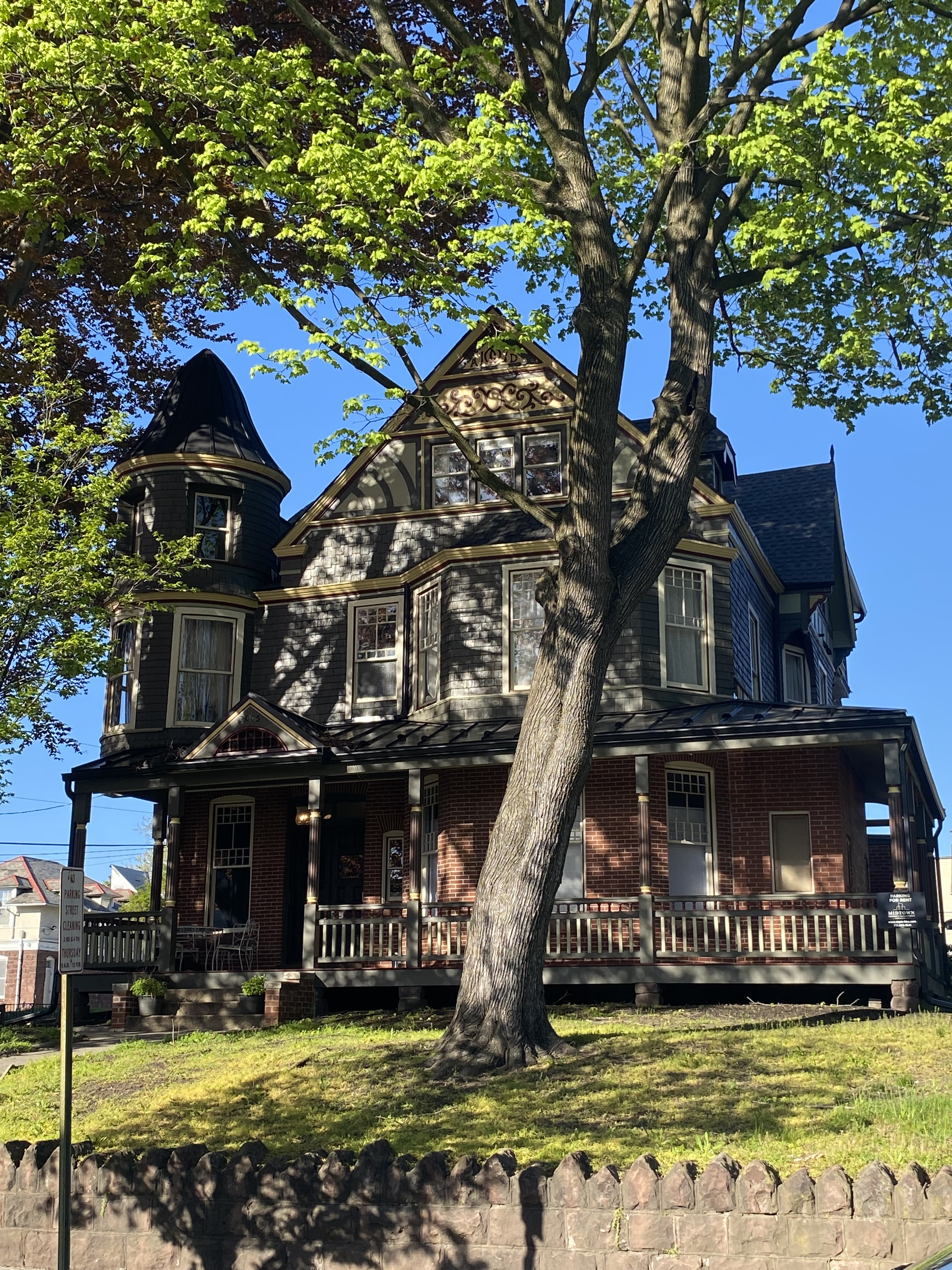
- William Donaldson Mansion in 2024

- Location within Pennsylvania Location within the United States
- Location: 2005 N. Third St., Harrisburg, Pennsylvania
- Coordinates: 40°16′41″N 76°53′42″W
- Area: less than one acre
- Built: 1887, 1910
- Architect: John C. Smith & James H. Warner
- Architectural style: Queen Anne
- NRHP reference No.: 90000699
- Added to NRHP: April 26, 1990

The William Donaldson House is an historic home that is located in Harrisburg, Dauphin County, Pennsylvania, United States.

It was added to the National Register of Historic Places in 1990.

== History and architectural features ==
Designed by Smith & Warner and built in 1887, this historic structure is a 3 1/2-story Queen Anne-style dwelling. Its construction was funded by William Mayne Donaldson, president of the Donaldson Paper Company, who originally resided there.

A rear addition was erected circa 1910. It has a stone foundation, brick first story, and wood shingle second and third stories. It features irregular massing, a variety of surface textures, multiple intersecting roofs, bay windows, porch and balconies, and a turret with spindle. The house was converted to apartments in 1925.

Following a period of disrepair, the building was purchased by a private developer in 2018 and restoration was completed by November 2022.
