= Oaks Cloister =

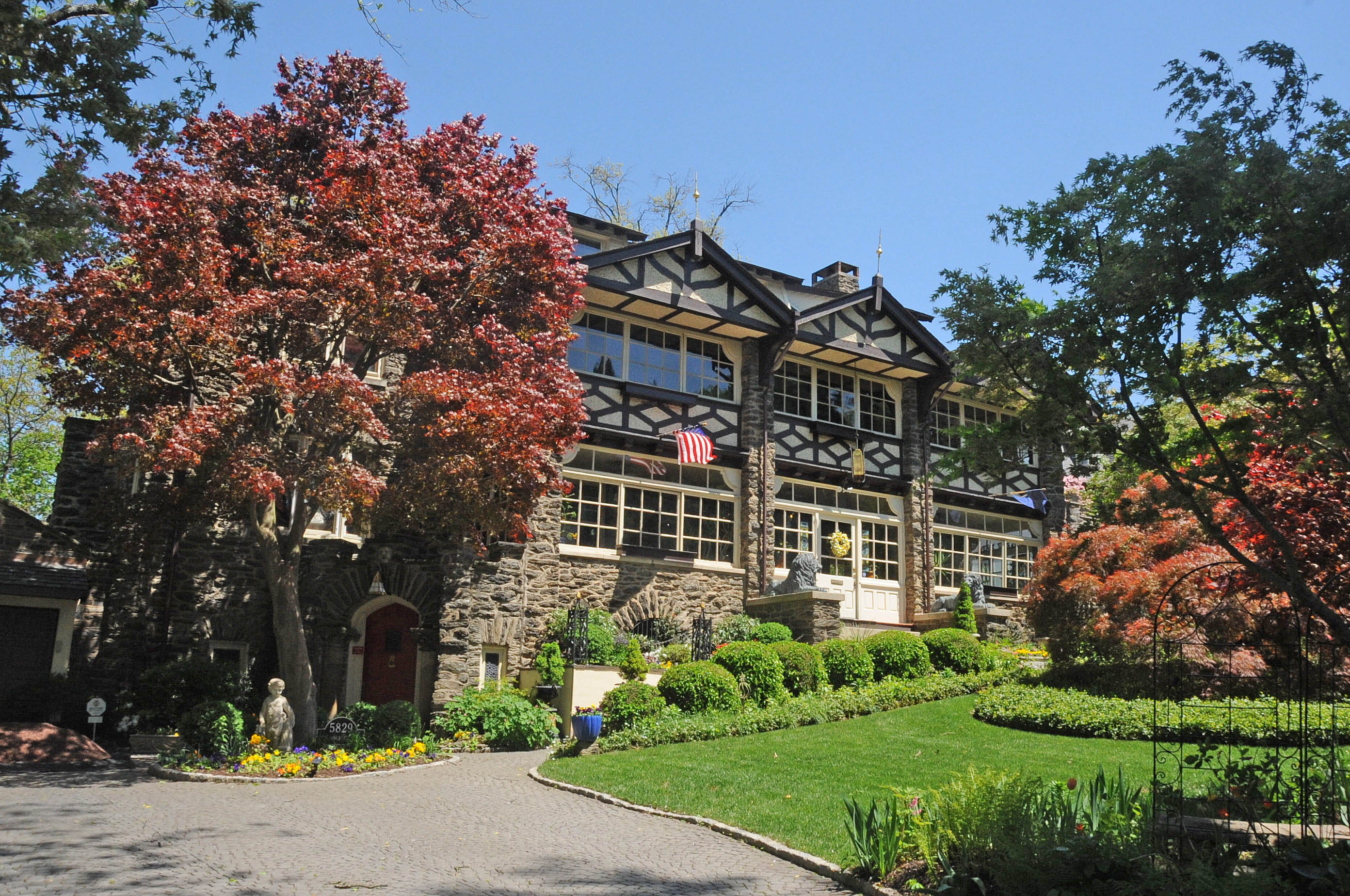
- Oaks Cloister exterior, April 2019

General information
- Architectural style: Tudor Craftsman Beaux-Arts, Renaissance Revival
- Location: 5829 Wissahickon Ave Philadelphia, PA 19141, Germantown
- Coordinates: 40.0296°N 75.1846°W
- Completed: c1904
- Renovated: 2002 - 2012

Design and construction
- Architect: Joseph Miller Huston
- Designations: 2005- PA Register of Historic Places 2019- US Register of Historic Places

Renovating team
- Other designers: Dr. Russell Harris and Mr. John Casavecchia

Oaks Cloister is a historic mansion in the Germantown section of Philadelphia. It was built in 1900 by the architect Joseph Miller Huston (1866-1940). Huston, who was the architect of the Pennsylvania Capitol, built Oaks Cloister as his home and studio.

The Tudor style home incorporates architectural elements and work by many capitol artists. Oaks Cloister was fully restored to its original glory in 2012, and was listed on the National Register of Historic Places in 2019.

== History ==
=== Huston Family (1900–1955) ===
Joseph Miller Huston was born in Philadelphia in 1866. He trained and worked as an architect during college and graduated from Princeton University in 1892. Huston founded his own firm in 1895, just a few short years after starting his career with famous Philadelphia architect Frank Furness. Huston designed Oaks Cloister creating an eclectic blend of English Tudor, Swiss Chalet and Craftsman styles. Huston also incorporated Beaux-Arts details, inspired by his best known work, the Pennsylvania State Capitol, which was under construction at the same time. Oaks Cloister became a veritable testing site and sampler for the capitol's architectural features, evident in the detailing throughout the home. Huston lived at Oaks Cloister until his death in 1940.

=== Post Huston Family (1955–2002) ===
Oaks Cloister remained in the Huston family until 1955 when it was bought by the Rev. John Wilbur Gouker and Mrs. Loice Ferdinand Gouker. The Goukers worked tirelessly and lovingly to preserve the rich history of Oaks Cloister. A short video was created showcasing the home during the Goukers' ownership. The video was produced by the Pennsylvania Capitol Preservation Committee and titled, "Oaks Cloister—The Home of Capitol Architect Joseph Huston". After the Goukers sold the home in about 1994, the property fell into disrepair and eventually was left abandoned.

=== Restoration (2002–2012) ===
After several years of dereliction, this esteemed estate was nearly destroyed. In 2002, Dr. Russell Harris and Mr. John Casavecchia acquired the property, saving it from imminent demolition. After over a decade of restoration efforts by ONeal Studios, the mansion was restored to its original glory. This dedicated labor of love also came with its fair share of unforeseen rewards. Many hidden treasures were unearthed during construction and brought back to life from dilapidated ruins. All 20 rooms of the century-old mansion were restored. Some of the more distinguished refurbished areas include:

- The Ballroom- Possibly the most dramatic restoration project was the transformation of the home's ballroom. When the project began, the ceilings and carved panels above the fireplace were covered in thick, dark soot and dirt. After some research, it was discovered that Huston had imported the hand-carved stone fireplace from Caen, France. It is believed that the piece is a replica of a royal fireplace, currently located in the Cluny Museum in Paris. The legend is that the original fireplace, named the "Chimnee de Couleur" had been custom made for King Francis I, in the 15th century. It was originally located in Rouen, France, but, two centuries later, when seeing it for the first time, Emperor Napoleon Bonaparte was so taken by the work of art he had it moved to capital city of Paris. Other features of the ballroom include:
  - a gilded coffered ceiling, which took 25,000 sheets of gold leaf to restore
  - a gold mosaic tile wall-niche/grotto, housing a sculpture named, "Venus in the Waves" by George Grey Barnard. Huston had also commissioned Bernard to create sculptures at the Pennsylvania Capitol.
- The Sitting Room- A mask, cast from the sculpture "Boar's Hunt", is mounted above the fireplace. The original carved wooden panel, by famous sculptor Alexander Stirling Calder, is located at Mercersburg Academy.
- Main Staircase- At the entrance foyer
- Master Bedroom- On the second floor.
- Dining Room- On the first floor.
- Music Room- On the first floor.
- Rathskeller- This underground beer hall was an addition to the original home, constructed after 1901.

=== Residence and Events Venue (2012-Present) ===
The restored facility has served as a meeting venue for special events.

In 2009, Oaks Cloister was used as a filming location for the movie, Cold By Nature.

== Historical Recognition ==
=== State Historical marker (2005) ===
A Pennsylvania state historic marker was placed on the property on October 20, 2005. It reads: "Joseph Huston (1866-1940) Oaks Cloister, built in 1900, was the home and studio of Philadelphia born Huston, architect of the Pa. Capitol. His Tudor home incorporates architectural elements and work by many capitol artists. He began his career at Furness and Evans, starting his firm in 1895."^{[2]}

=== National Register of Historic Places (2019) ===
Oaks Cloister was placed on the National Register of Historic Places on April 22, 2019.
