= The Apotheosis of Pennsylvania =

Mural in Pennsylvania

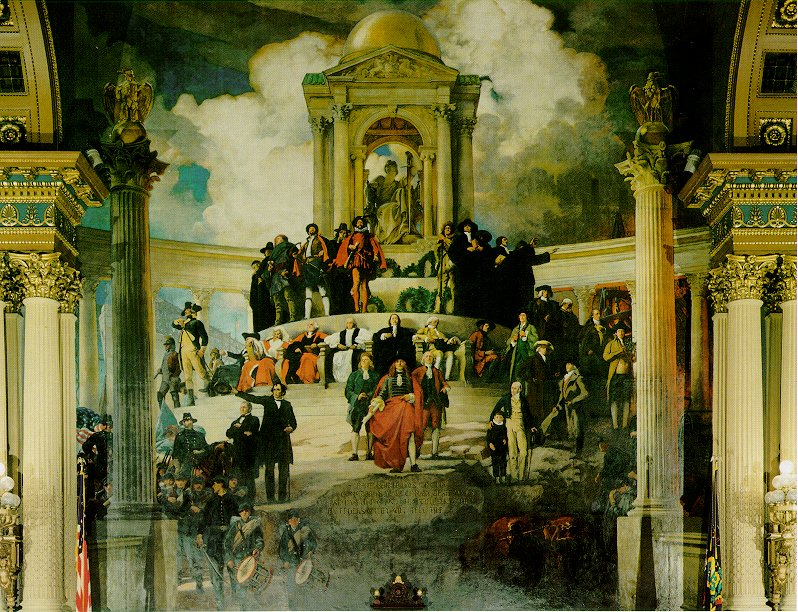
- The Apotheosis of Pennsylvania in the House Chamber of the Pennsylvania State Capitol
- Artist: Edwin Austin Abbey
- Year: 1908–1911
- Medium: Oil on canvas (mural)
- Location: Harrisburg, Pennsylvania

The Apotheosis of Pennsylvania is a mural located in the House Chamber of the Pennsylvania State Capitol in Harrisburg, Pennsylvania. Painted by American artist Edwin Austin Abbey between 1908 and 1911, it is the largest mural in the Capitol and stands behind the Speaker's rostrum. The work depicts 28 notable Pennsylvanians arranged around allegorical figures representing the state's history, ideals, and achievements.

== Description ==
At the mural's center stands William Penn, dressed in a red robe, flanked by Benjamin Franklin and Robert Morris. They stand on a rock inscribed with the biblical verse: “Remember the days of old, consider the years of many generations: ask thy father and he shall show thee, they elders, and they will tell thee” from Deuteronomy. Above them rises a figure symbolizing the Genius of State within a classical temple-like structure. Radiating outward are explorers such as Daniel Boone, scientists including David Rittenhouse, reformers like Thaddeus Stevens, and other figures representing military and industrial progress.

== History ==
Abbey was commissioned to create murals for the newly built State Capitol, completed in 1906 under architect Joseph Miller Huston. His contributions to the House Chamber included The Apotheosis of Pennsylvania, Penn’s Treaty, and The Hours (a ceiling allegory). Abbey created the Apotheosis in his London studio and shipped it to Harrisburg for installation. He died in 1911 before the mural was fully installed, and his assistant William Simmonds oversaw its completion.

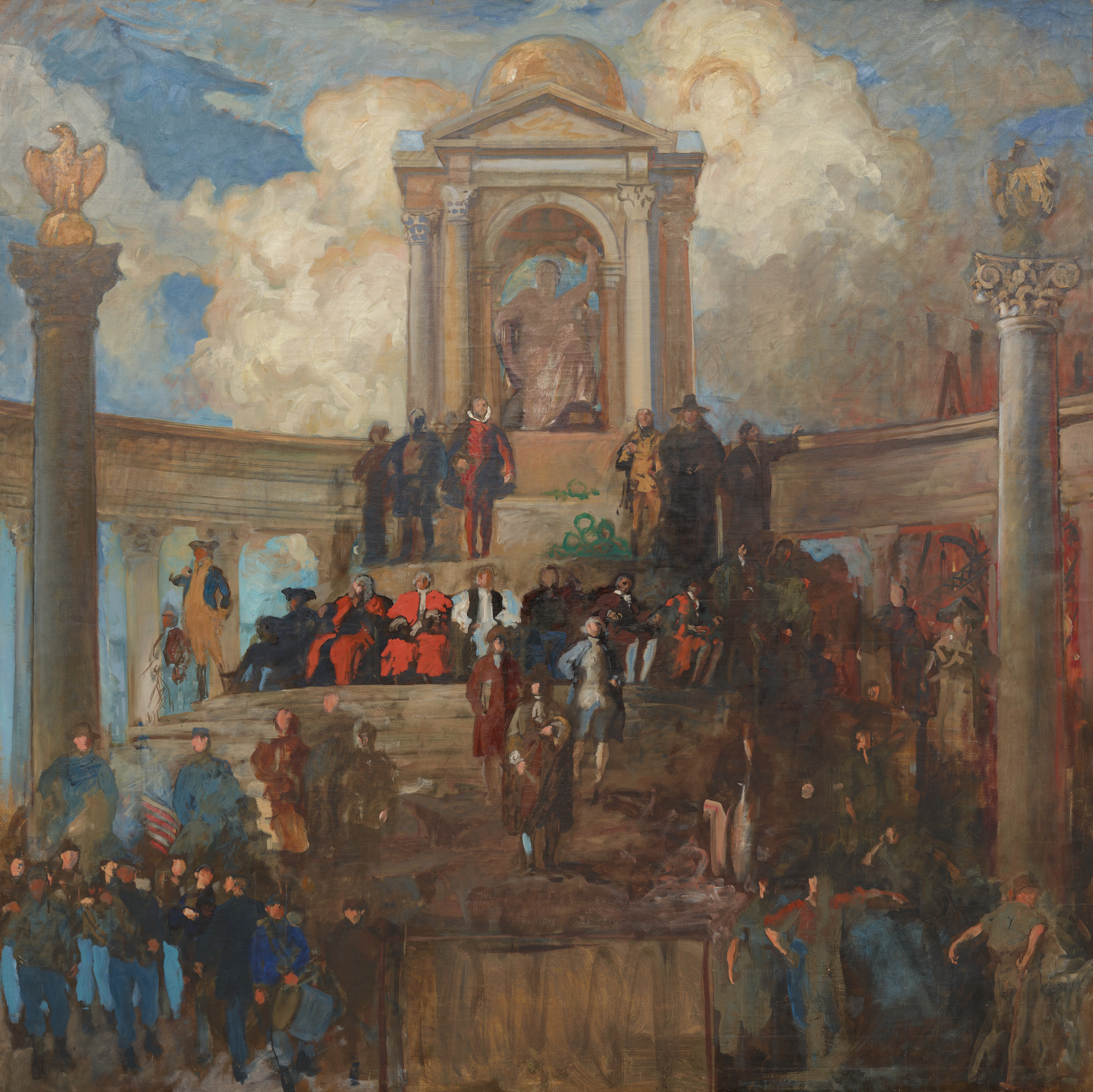
Study for The Apotheosis of Pennsylvania (c. 1909–1911), oil on canvas, Yale University Art Gallery

As part of his preparation, Abbey painted a large-scale study for the mural, now in the collection of the Yale University Art Gallery. Also created in oil on canvas circa 1909–1911 and measuring 68 × 68 in (173 × 173 cm), the study shows how Abbey planned the placement of historical figures and symbolic elements before painting the large mural in the Capitol. It was produced in Abbey's London studio and entered Yale's collection in 1937 following a donation from his estate. Yale has also featured the work in programming on Abbey's legacy, including a gallery talk that addressed both its artistic context and the conservation treatment it has received. In 2024, the Yale University Art Gallery completed a restoration of the study using a technique known as "mist lining", which repaired structural defects in the canvas.

== Figures depicted ==
The mural features 28 Pennsylvanians spanning exploration, politics, science, reform, and military history. Among them are: William Penn, Benjamin Franklin, Robert Morris, Daniel Boone, David Rittenhouse, John Dickinson, Benjamin Rush, Thaddeus Stevens, and Thomas Paine.

== Legacy ==
The Apotheosis of Pennsylvania is regarded as a central work in the Capitol's decorative program. The Pennsylvania State Capitol itself has often been described as a "palace of art" for its rich collection of murals, stained glass, and sculpture. The building was designated a National Historic Landmark on September 20, 2006, coinciding with its centennial.
