= Edwin Austin Abbey =

American painter (1852–1911)

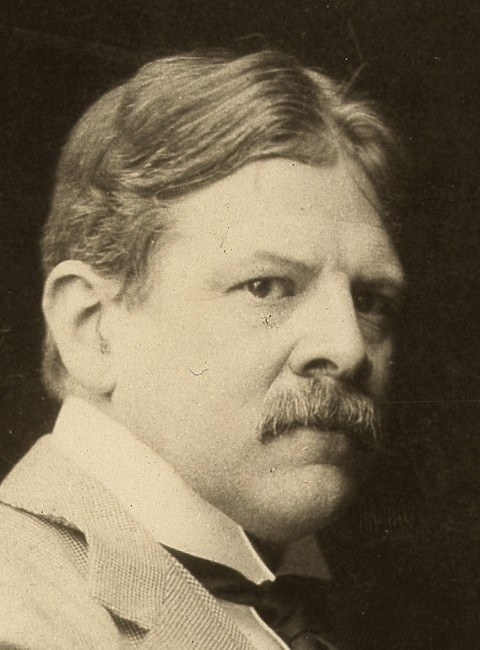
- Abbey, c. 1900
- Born: April 1, 1852; Philadelphia, Pennsylvania, U.S.
- Died: August 1, 1911 (aged 59); London, England
- Education: Pennsylvania Academy of the Fine Arts
- Known for: Painting
- Spouse: Gertrude Mead

Edwin Austin Abbey (April 1, 1852 – August 1, 1911) was an American muralist, illustrator, and painter. He flourished at the beginning of what is now referred to as the "golden age" of illustration, and is best known for his drawings and paintings of Shakespearean and Victorian subjects, as well as for his painting of Edward VII's coronation. His most famous set of murals, The Quest and Achievement of the Holy Grail, adorns the Boston Central Library.

== Early life and education ==
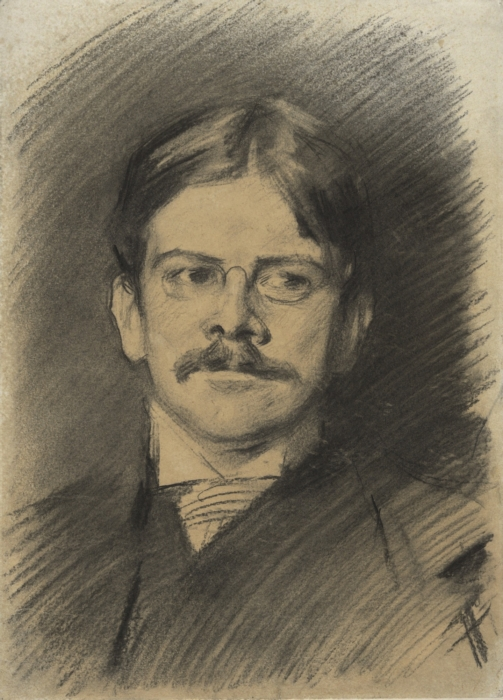
Edwin Austin Abbey, an 1888 illustration by John Singer Sargent now housed at the Yale University Art Gallery

Abbey was born in Philadelphia, on April 1, 1852, to commercial broker William Maxwell Abbey and Margery Ann Kiple. He studied art at the Pennsylvania Academy of the Fine Arts in Philadelphia under Christian Schussele.

== Career ==
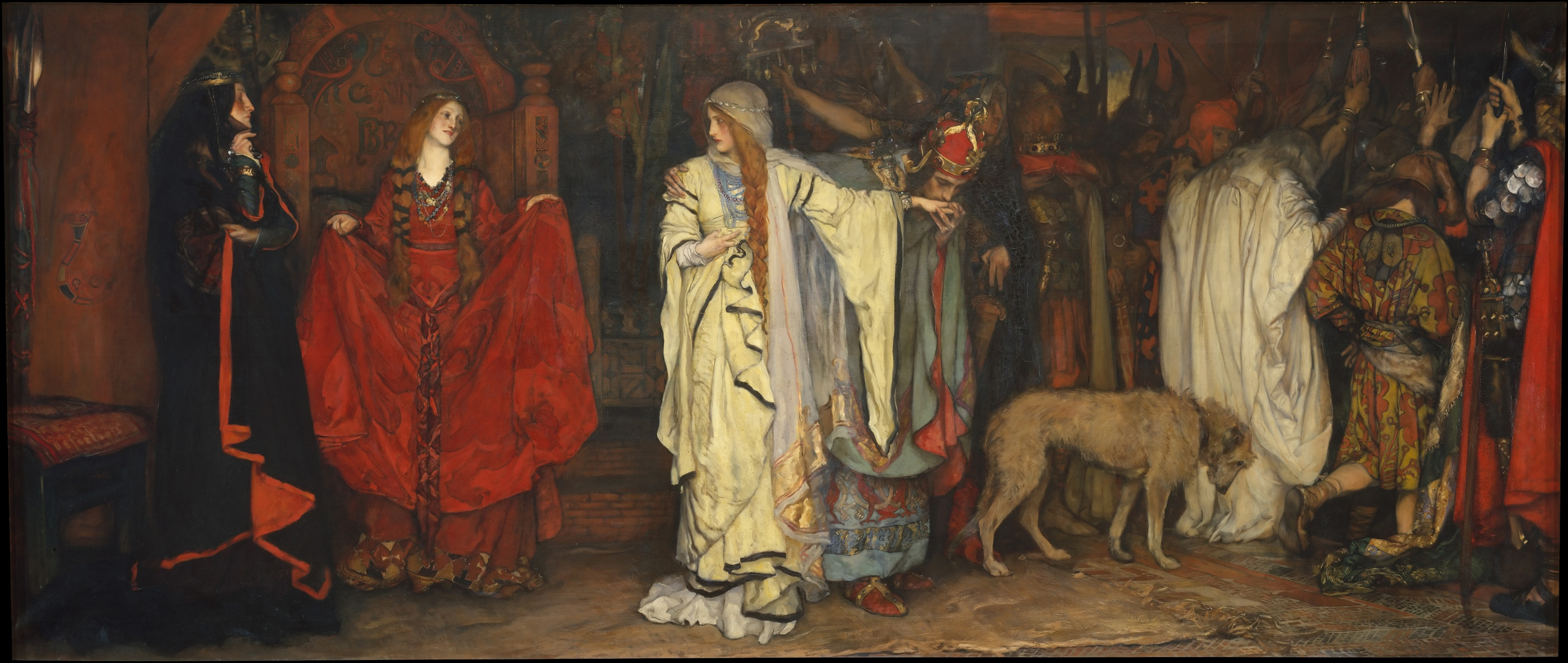
King Lear, Act I, Scene I (1897–98) now housed at the Metropolitan Museum of Art

Abbey began as an illustrator, producing numerous illustrations and sketches magazines, including Harper's Weekly (1871–1874) and Scribner's Magazine. His illustrations began appearing in Harper's Weekly before Abbey was twenty years old. He moved to New York City in 1871. His illustrations were strongly influenced by French and German black and white art: Adolph Menzel and Daniel Vierge; and by English artists. He illustrated several best-selling books, including Christmas Stories by Charles Dickens (1875), Selections from the Poetry of Robert Herrick (1882), and She Stoops to Conquer by Oliver Goldsmith (1887). Abbey also illustrated a four-volume set of The Comedies of Shakespeare for Harper & Brothers in 1896.

In 1878, he moved to England at the request of his employers to gather material for illustrations of the poems of Robert Herrick, published in 1882, and he settled permanently there in 1883.

In 1883, he was elected to the Royal Institute of Painters in Water-Colours. About this time, he was appraised critically by the American writer, S.G.W. Benjamin:

It must be taken into consideration that he is still very young; that he now for the first time visits the studios and galleries of Europe; that his advantages for a regular art education have been very moderate, and that he is practically self-educated. And then compare with these disadvantages the amount and the quality of the illustrations he has turned out, and we see represented in him genius of a high order, combining almost inexhaustible creativeness, clearness and vividness of conception, a versatile fancy, a poetic perception of beauty, a quaint, delicate humor, a wonderful grasp of whatever is weird and mysterious, and admirable chiaro-oscuro, drawing, and composition. When we note such a rare combination of qualities, we cease to be surprised at the cordial recognition awarded his genius by the best judges, both in London and Paris, even before he had left this country.

He also created illustrations for Goldsmith's She Stoops to Conquer (1887), for a volume of Old Songs (1889), and for the comedies (and a few of the tragedies) of Shakespeare. Among his water-colours are "The Evil Eye" (1877), "The Rose in October" (1879), "An Old Song" (1886), "The Visitors" (1890), and "The Jongleur" (1892). Possibly his best known pastels are "Beatrice", "Phyllis", and "Two Noble Kinsmen".

In 1890, he made his first appearance with an oil painting, "A May Day Morn", at the Royal Academy in London. He exhibited "Richard duke of Gloucester and the Lady Anne" there in 1896, and in that year was elected A.R.A., becoming a full member in 1898. He received a gold medal at the Pan-American Exposition and was commissioned to paint the coronation of King Edward VII in 1901; in the next year, he was chosen to paint the coronation. It was the official painting of the occasion and, hence, resides at Buckingham Palace. He did receive a knighthood, although some say he refused it in 1907. Friendly with other expatriate American artists, he summered at Broadway, Worcestershire, England, where he painted and vacationed alongside John Singer Sargent at the home of Francis Davis Millet.

He completed murals for the Boston Central Library in the 1890s. The frieze for the Library was titled "The Quest and Achievement of the Holy Grail". It took Abbey eleven years to complete this series of murals in his England studio. In 1897 he received the honorary degree of A.M. from Yale university. In 2024, the Yale University Art Gallery completed restoration of his "Study for the Apotheosis of Pennsylvania" using a technique known as "mist lining" which repaired structural defects in the canvas.

In 1904 he painted a mural for the Royal Exchange, London Reconciliation of the Skinners & Merchant Taylors' Companies by Lord Mayor Billesden, 1484.

=== Pennsylvania State Capitol ===
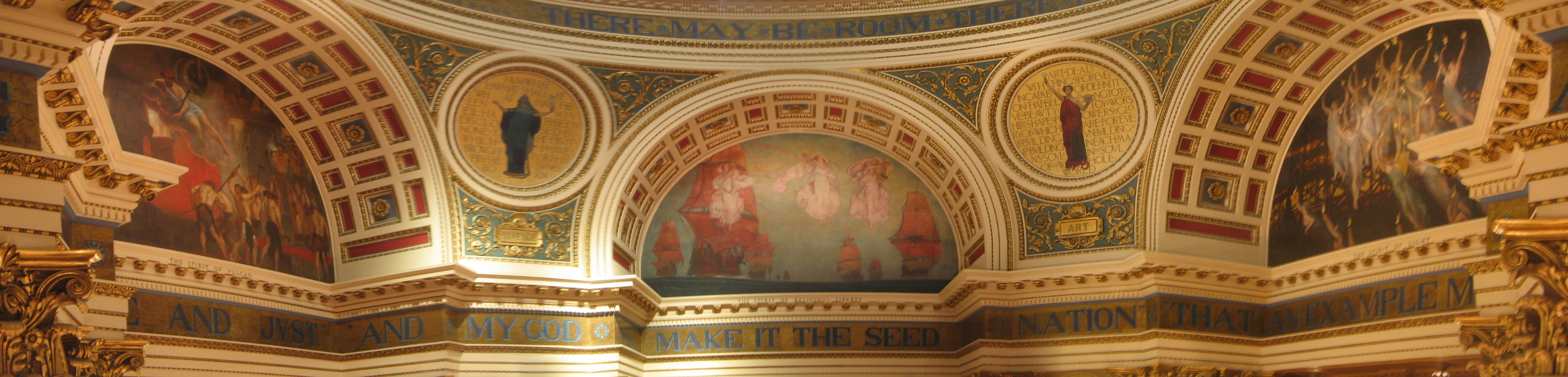
Lunette and medallion murals (1908–11) at the Pennsylvania State Capitol Rotunda. Left to right: The Spirit of Vulcan, Science, The Spirit of Religious Liberty, Art, The Spirit of Light.

In 1908–09, Abbey began an ambitious program of murals and other artworks for the newly completed Pennsylvania State Capitol in Harrisburg, Pennsylvania. These included allegorical medallion murals representing Science, Art, Justice, and Religion for the dome of the Rotunda, four large lunette murals beneath the dome, and multiple works for the House and Senate Chambers. For the Senate chamber he finished only one painting, Von Steuben Training the American Soldiers at Valley Forge, and he was working on the Reading of the Declaration of Independence mural in early 1911, when his health began to fail. He was diagnosed with cancer. Studio assistant William Simmonds continued work on the mural with little supervision from Abbey, and with small contributions by John Singer Sargent.

== Death ==
On August 1st, 1911, Abbey died in London. William Simmonds travelled from England to install the completed murals with Abbey's widow Gertrude. The remaining two rooms, which Abbey had been unable to finish, were given to Violet Oakley, who completed the commission using her own designs.

== Legacy ==
Abbey was elected to the National Academy of Design, in 1902, and The American Academy of Arts and Letters. He was honorary member of the Royal Bavarian Society and the Société Nationale des Beaux-Arts, and was made a chevalier of the French Legion of Honour. He was a prolific illustrator, and attention to detail, including historical accuracy, influenced successive generations of illustrators.

Edwin had been a keen supporter of the newly founded British School at Rome (BSR), so, in his memory, his widow donated £6000 to assist in building the artists' studio block and, in 1926, founded the Incorporated Edwin Austin Abbey Memorial Scholarships. The scholarships were established to enable British and American painters to pursue their practice. Recipients of Abbey funding – Scholars and, more recently, Fellows – devote their scholarship to working in the studios at the BSR, where there has, ever since, been at least one Abbey-funded artist in residence. Previous award holders include Stephen Farthing, Chantal Joffe and Spartacus Chetwynd. The Abbey Fellowships (formerly 'Awards') were established in their present form in 1990, and the Abbey studios also host the BSR's other Fine Art residencies, such as the Derek Hill Foundation Scholarship and the Sainsbury Scholarship in Painting and Drawing. A bust of Edwin Abbey, by Sir Thomas Brock, stands in the courtyard of the BSR.

Edwin also left works to the Metropolitan Museum of Art in New York, to the Museum of Fine Arts, Boston and to the National Gallery in London.

Abbey is buried in the churchyard of Old St Andrew's Church in Kingsbury, London. His grave is Grade II listed.

== Family ==
In 1890, Edwin married (Mary) Gertrude Mead, the daughter of Frederick Mead, a New York merchant. She encouraged her husband to secure more ambitious commissions. The marriage remained childless.

After her husband's death, Gertrude was active in preserving her husband's legacy, writing about his work and giving her substantial collection and archive to Yale. In 1932, through the Edwin Austin Abbey Memorial Fund for Mural Painting, she endowed the Abbey Mural Prize to support the creation and restoration of public murals in the United States. It is awarded each year by a jury of National Academicians through the National Academy of Design. She was a sponsor of the Survey of London.

== Works by Abbey ==
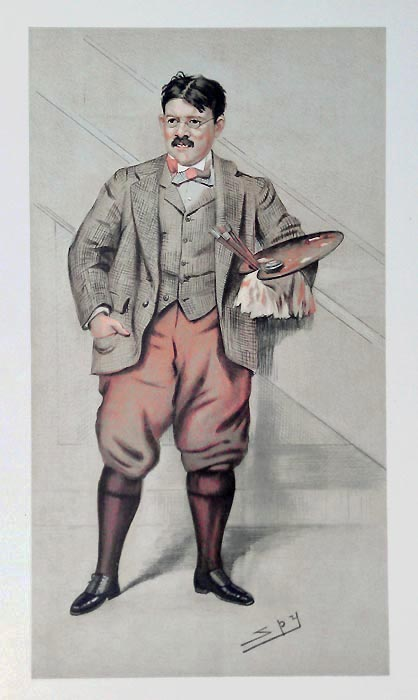
Edwin Austin Abbey (1898), by Leslie Ward, Vanity Fair, December 29, 1898

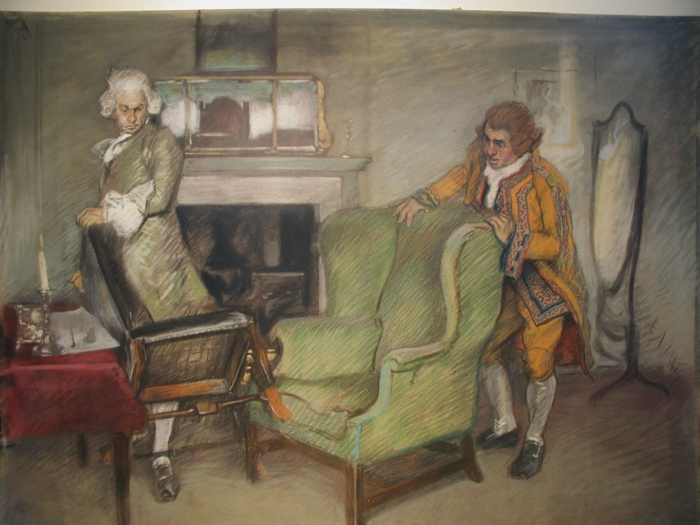
Bob Acres and His Servant (c. 1895), Yale University Art Gallery

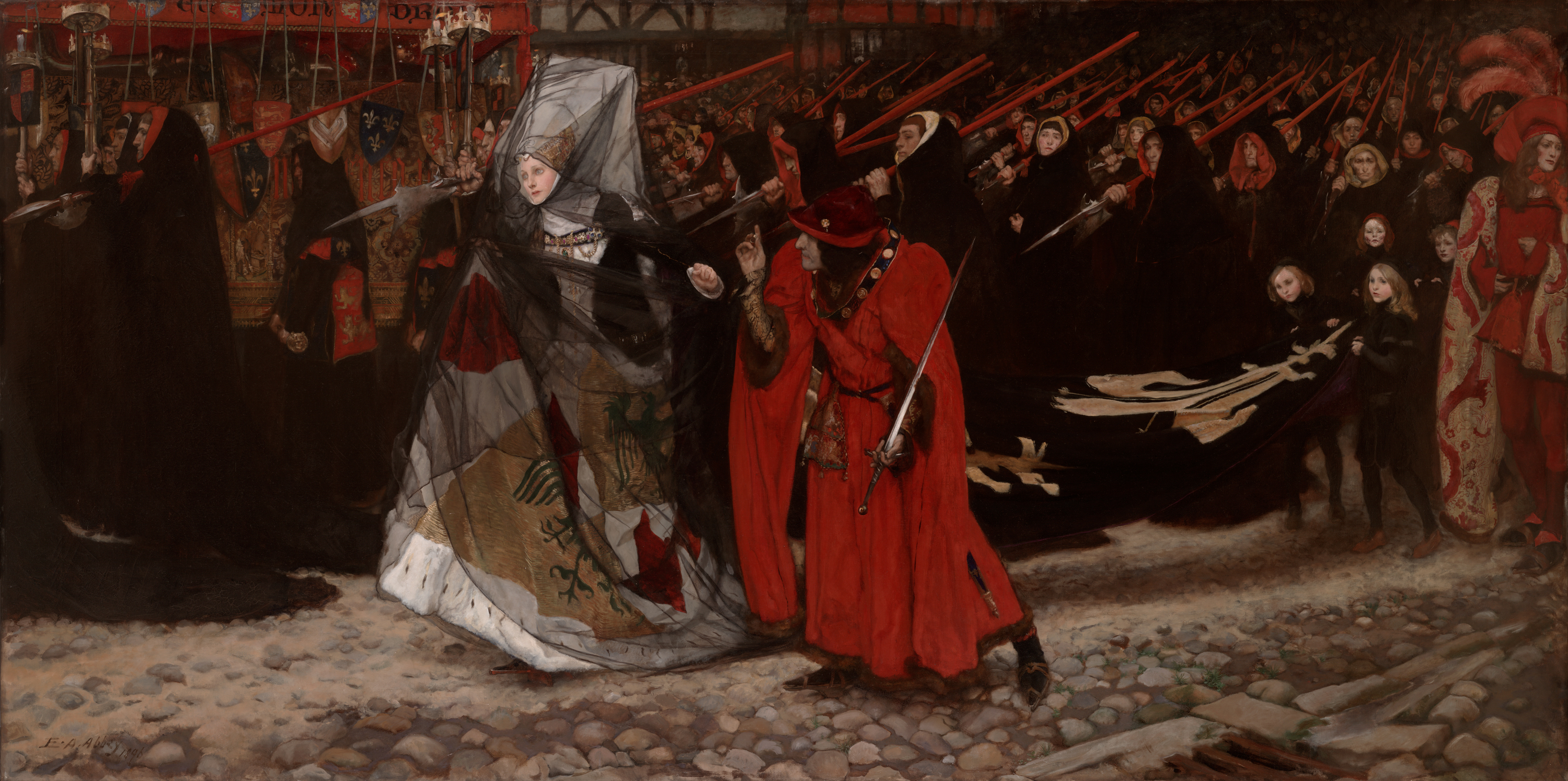
Richard, Duke of Gloucester, and the Lady Anne (1896), Yale University Art Gallery

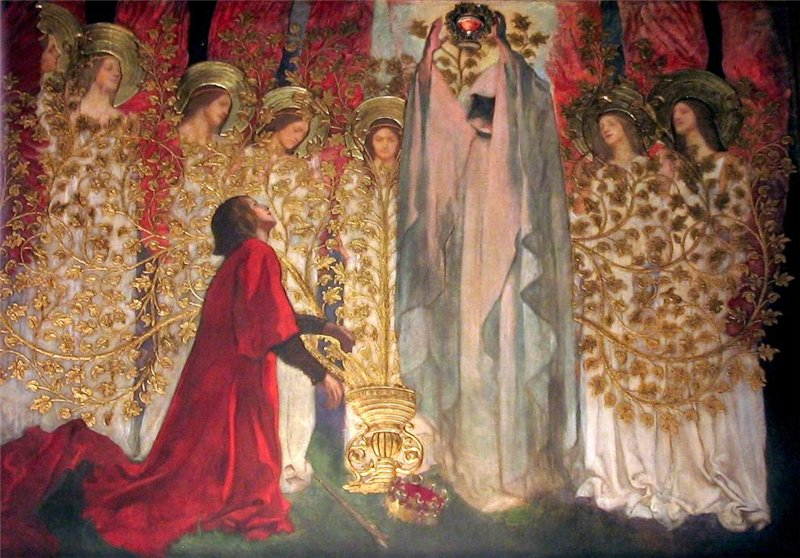
Sir Galahad and the Holy Grail (1896–1901), Boston Central Library

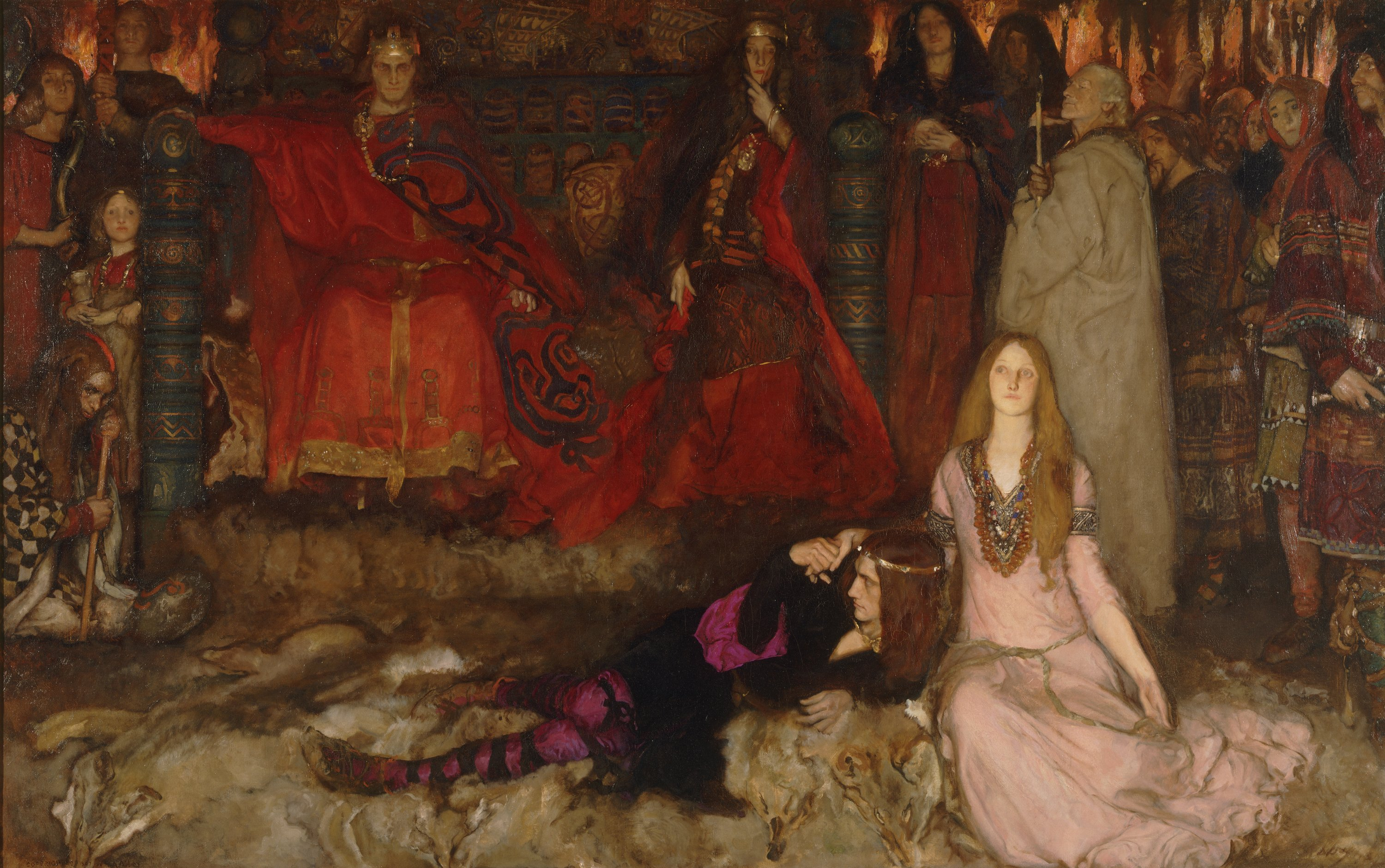
The Play Scene in Hamlet (1897), Yale University Art Gallery

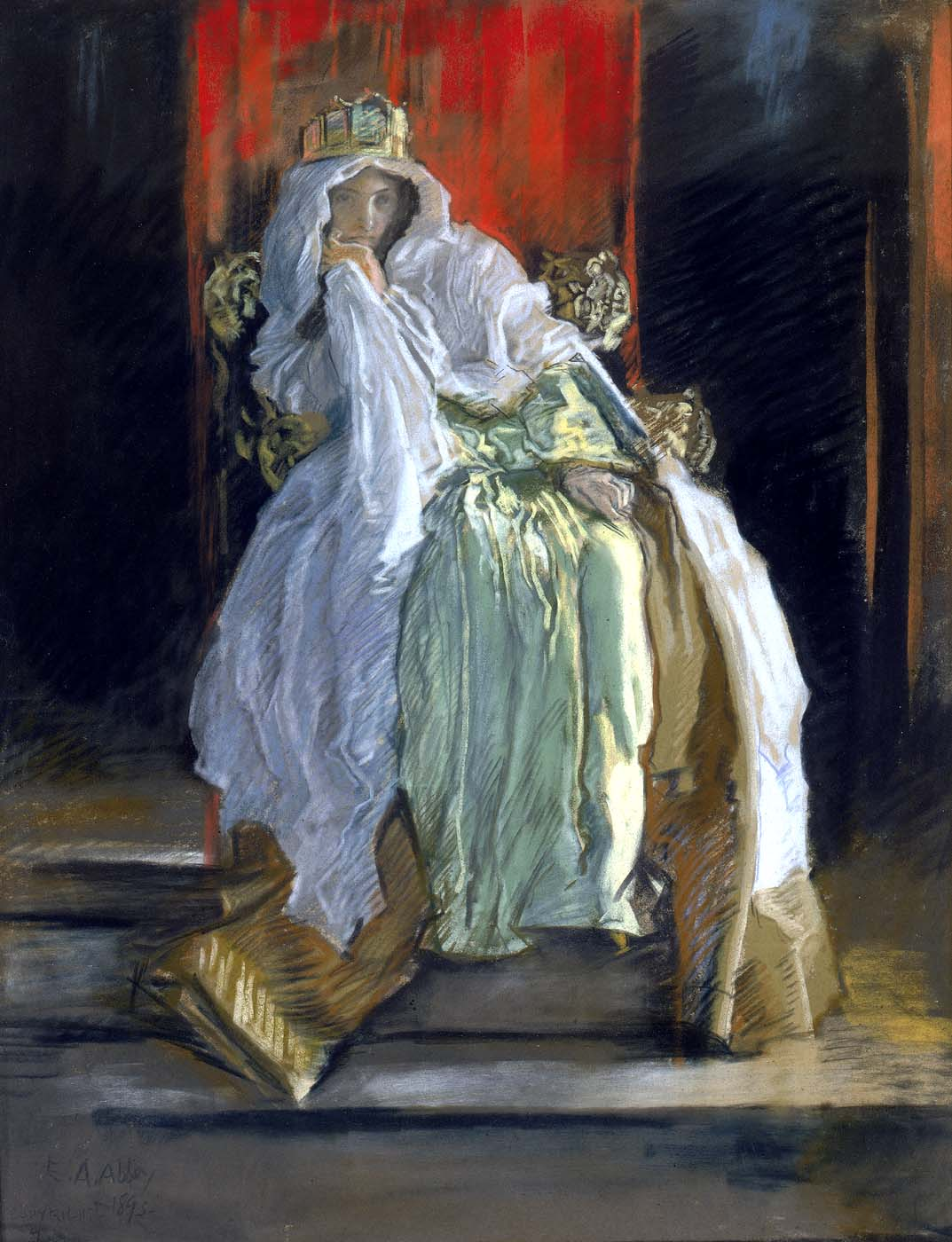
The Queen in Hamlet (c. 1897), private collection

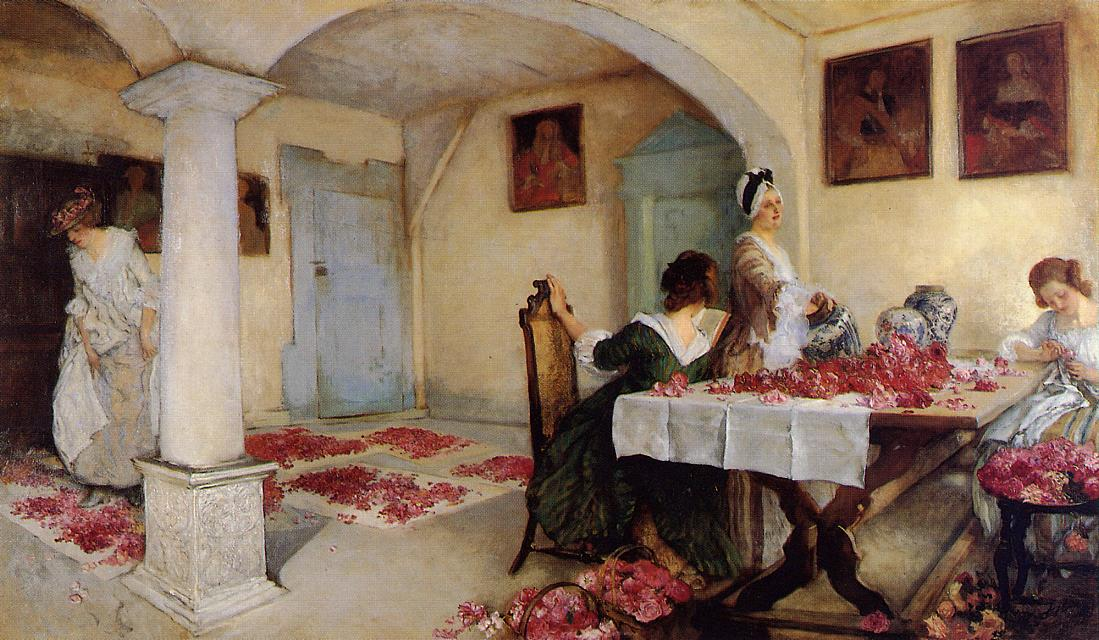
Potpourri (1899), private collection

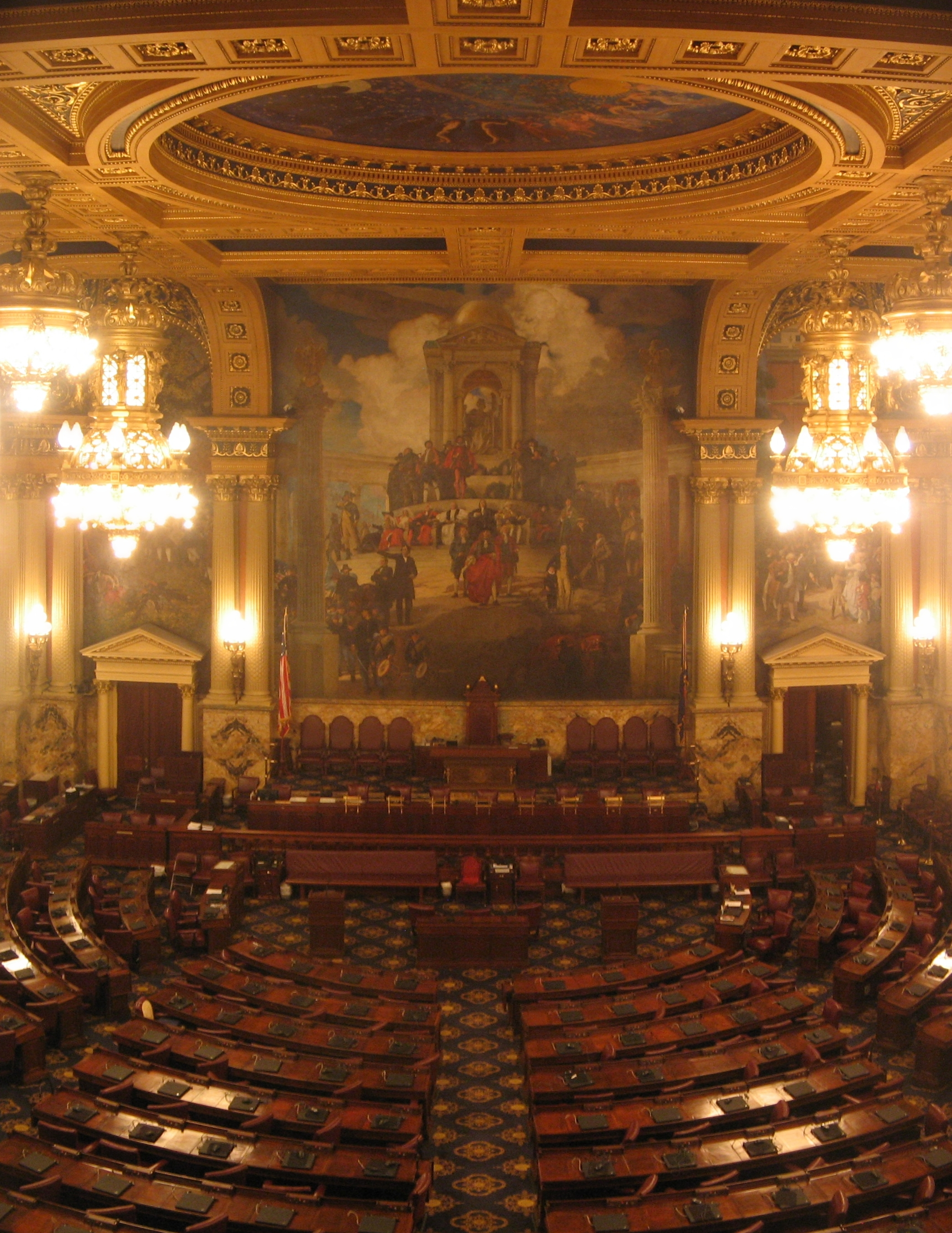
Apotheosis of Pennsylvania (1908–11), House Chamber, Pennsylvania State Capitol in Harrisburg, Pennsylvania

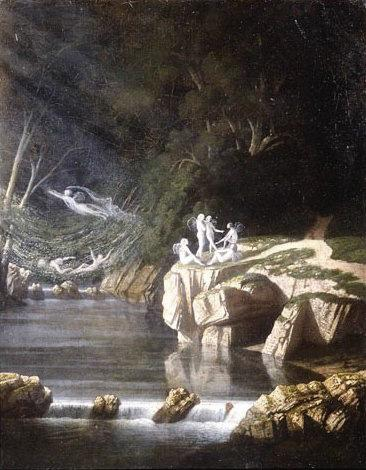
Fairies

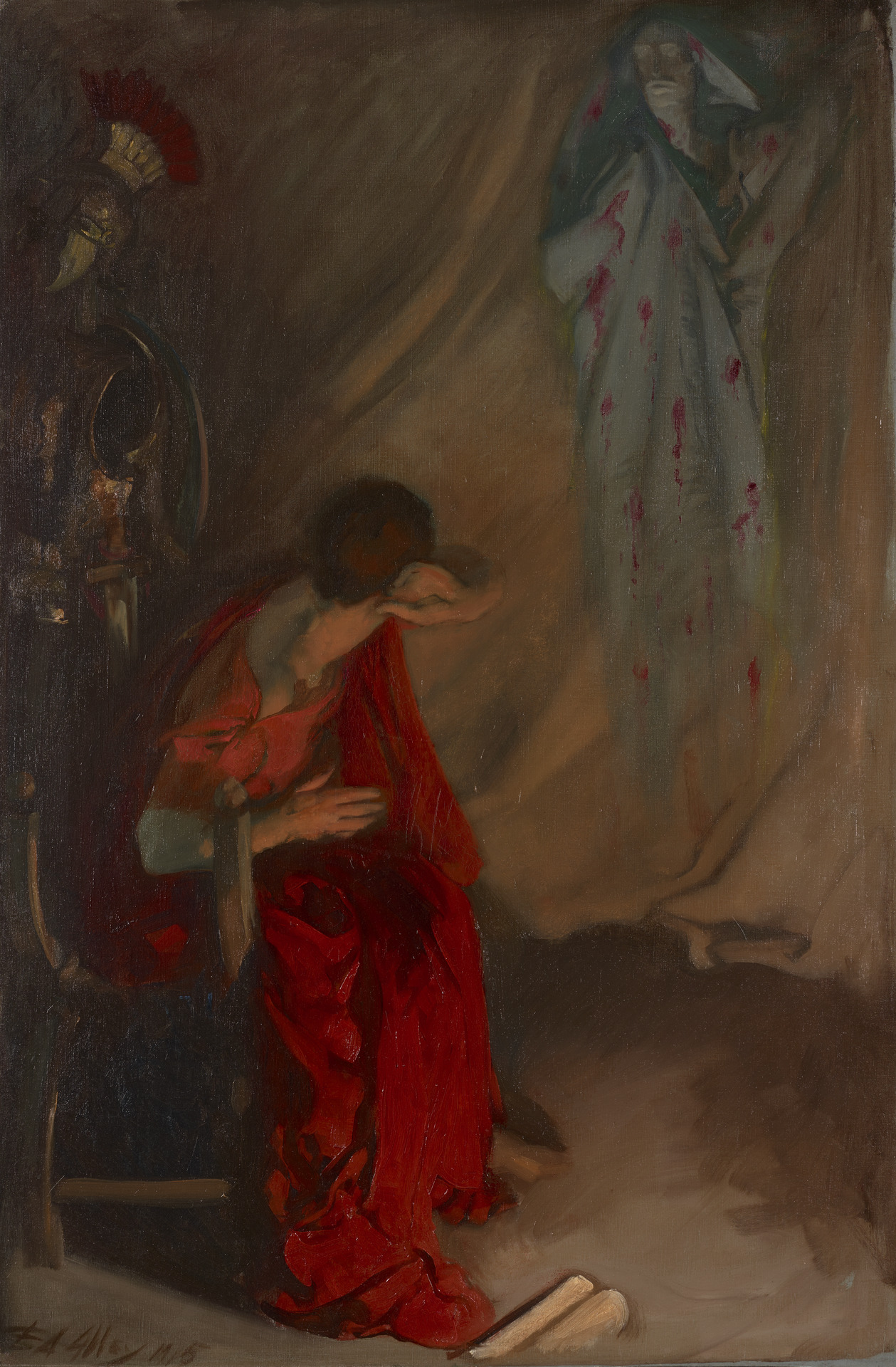
Within the Tent of Brutus: Enter the Ghost of Caesar, Julius Caesar, Act IV, Scene III

== Bibliography ==
- Dickens, C. - Christmas Stories, Harper & Brothers, 1875
- Longfellow, H. W. - The Poetical Works, Houghton, 1880–1883
- Herrick, R. - Selections from the Poetry of Robert Herrick, Harper & Brothers, 1882
- Black, W. - Judith Shakespeare, Harper & Brothers, 1884
- Boughton, G. H. - Sketching Rambles in Holland, Macmillan 1885
- Sheridan, R. B. - Comedies, Chatto & Windus, London, 1885
- Goldsmith, O. - She Stoops to Conquer, Harper & Brothers, 1887
- Abbey, E. A. - Old Songs, Harper & Brothers, 1888
- ----- The Quiet Life, Harper & Brothers, 1890
- Shakespeare, W. - The Comedies, Harper & Brothers, 1896
- Goldsmith, O. - The Deserted Village, Harper & Brothers, 1902
- Stevens, L. O. - King Arthur Stories, Houghton 1908

== Sources ==
- http://www.columbia.edu/cu/record/archives/vol19/vol19_iss24/record1924.33
- Nancy Mendes. "Edwin Austin Abbey: A Capital Artist." Pennsylvania Heritage magazine 32, no. 3 (Summer 2006): 6–15.
- Elisa Tamarkin. "The Chestnuts of Edwin Austin Abbey: History Painting and the Transference of Culture in Turn-of-the-Century America." Prospects 24 (1999): 417–448.
- Corcoran Gallery of Art, Washington, D.C.
