= State Street Bridge (Harrisburg, Pennsylvania) =

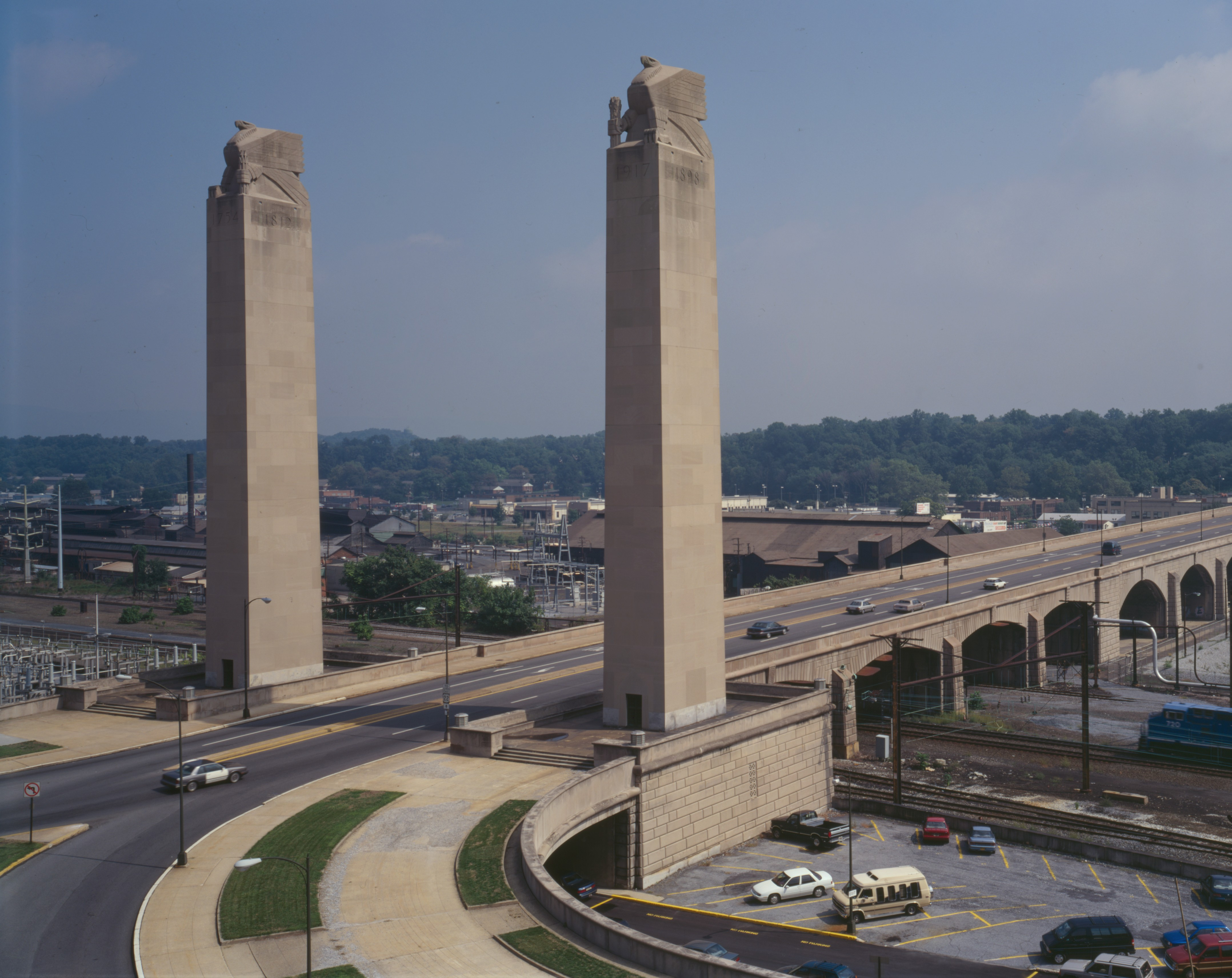
- HAER photo of the State Street Bridge
- Coordinates: 40°16′0″N 76°52′42″W
- Carries: SR 3014 (State Street)
- Crosses: PA 230, Paxton Creek, Amtrak / Norfolk Southern tracks
- Locale: Dauphin, Pennsylvania, United States
- Other name(s): Soldiers and Sailors Memorial Bridge
- Maintained by: PennDOT
- NBI #: 223014003001900

Characteristics
- Total length: 1,312 ft (400 m)
- Width: 80 ft (24 m)
- Load limit: 36 short tons (33 t)

History
- Constructed by: William Gehron, Sidney F. Ross
- Construction end: August 22, 1930

Statistics
- Daily traffic: 8,182 (2009)
- State Street Bridge
- U.S. National Register of Historic Places
- MPS: Highway Bridges Owned by the Commonwealth of Pennsylvania, Department of Transportation TR
- NRHP reference No.: 88000761
- Added to NRHP: June 22, 1988

Location
- Interactive map of State Street Bridge

The State Street Bridge, also known as the Soldiers and Sailors Memorial Bridge, is a 1,312-foot (400 m) concrete, deck arch bridge that spans Pennsylvania Route 230 and Paxton Creek in Harrisburg, Pennsylvania. The bridge was completed in 1930 and was intended to be the principal entrance into downtown Harrisburg and the Pennsylvania State Capitol Complex from the east.

The bridge was listed on the National Register of Historic Places on June 22, 1988, and was documented by the Historic American Engineering Record in 1997.

== History ==
After the Pennsylvania State Capitol building burned to ground in 1897, plans were drawn up to improve and expand the park that surrounds the Capitol building. The plans were for a more impressive Capitol building that would prevent other Pennsylvania cities like Philadelphia from challenging Harrisburg's claim as the seat of the state government. After the land that was necessary for the expansion was acquired in 1916, Arnold Brunner was hired to design the plans for the construction and landscaping of the new buildings. Planning was interrupted by World War I.

After the war, in 1919, it was decided to make the bridge a memorial to the armed forces of the United States and Pennsylvania that had fought in the war. The Pennsylvania General Assembly passed an act authorizing the construction of the bridge on July 18, 1919. In 1926, William Gehron and Sidney Ross revised the plans that Brunner had made for the bridge in 1921 after his death in 1925. Changes they made included a more massive bridge and taller, "more streamlined" pylons.

Construction began on the bridge in September 1925. The General Assembly appropriated $361,000 ($6.69 million in present-day terms) for the bridge in the 1927 and 1929 sessions of the assembly. The city of Harrisburg also contributed $300,000 ($5.56 million in present-day terms). The bridge was completed on August 22, 1930.

The bridge was renovated in 1955 by J. Richard Nissley, who added a 36-foot (11 m) steel girder span on the bridge's east end. The road deck and sidewalks were replaced in 1957. The State Street Bridge was listed on the National Register of Historic Places on June 22, 1988.

== Design ==
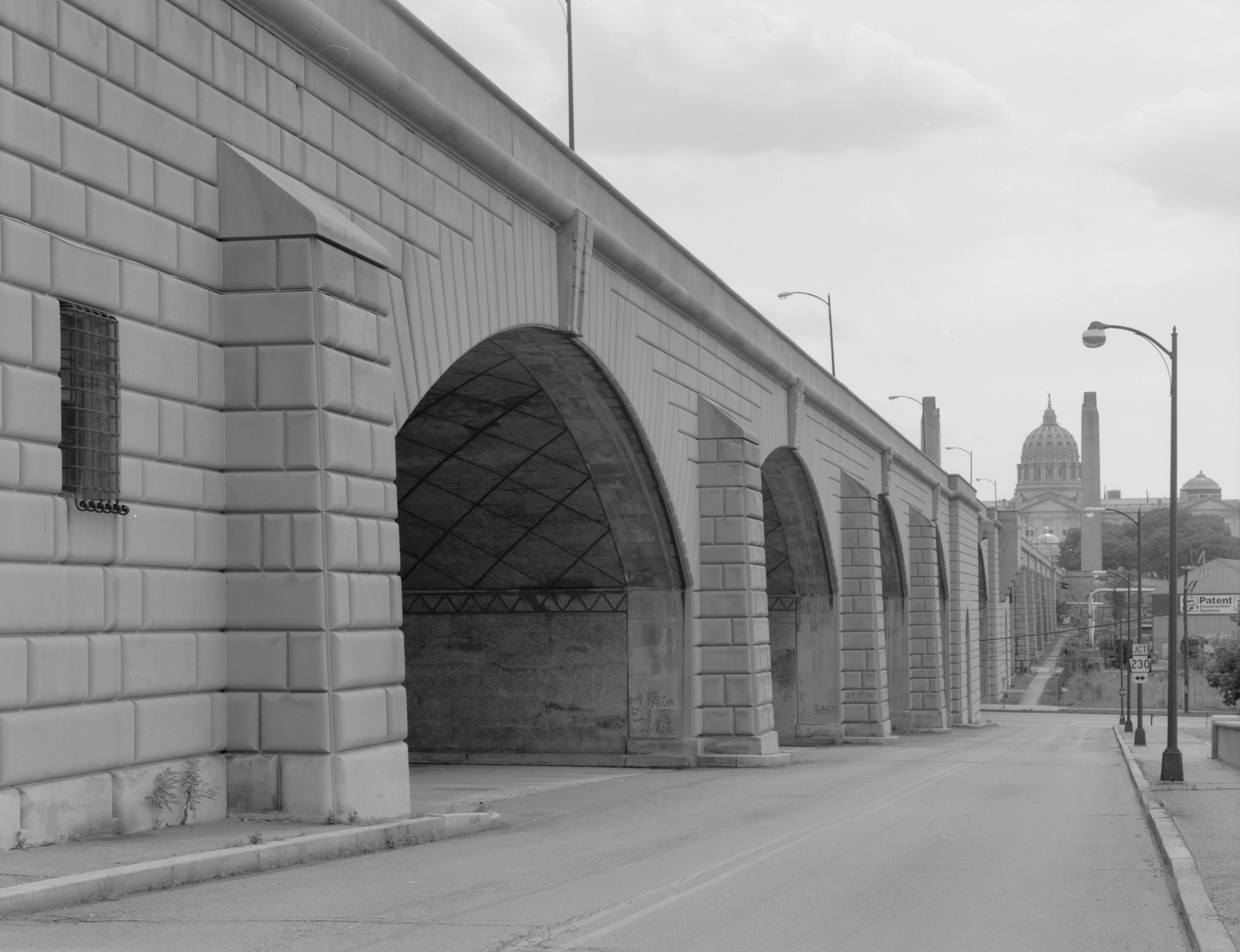
HAER photo of the arches with the pylons and the State Capitol dome in the background

Two 145-foot (44 m) tall and 16-foot (4.9 m) wide pylons flank the western end of the bridge. Each pylon has an eagle perched on it, one signifying the United States Army and the other signifying the United States Navy. Each eagle weighs approximately 300 short tons (270 t) and is 21 feet (6.4 m) tall. The eagles were created by sculptor Lee Lawrie. The four faces of the pylons each have the year of one of eight wars that United States had participated in up until World War I.

The keystone of each arch of the bridge has a carving of a weapon that was developed and used during World War I.

Although never built, plans for the bridge included a museum built under the western end of the bridge. The museum was to include Pennsylvania flags that were used in battle and a list of all the Pennsylvanians who fought in World War I.

== See also ==
- List of bridges documented by the Historic American Engineering Record in Pennsylvania
- List of bridges on the National Register of Historic Places in Pennsylvania
- National Register of Historic Places listings in Dauphin County, Pennsylvania
