= Joseph Miller Huston =

American architect (1866–1940)

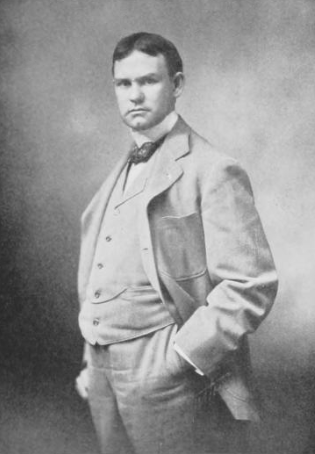
- Born: February 23, 1866; Philadelphia, Pennsylvania, U.S.
- Died: November 16, 1940 (aged 74); Philadelphia, Pennsylvania, U.S.
- Burial place: West Laurel Hill Cemetery, Bala Cynwyd, Pennsylvania, U.S.
- Education: Princeton University (1892)
- Political party: Republican
- Spouse: Matilde Lewis MacGregor (m. 1901)

Joseph Miller Huston (February 23, 1866 – November 16, 1940) was an American architect. He began his career at the architectural firm of Frank Furness and Sons and worked on the design of the Pennsylvania Railroad's Broad Street Station. He opened his own firm and worked on the Benjamin Franklin Bridge, the Monmouth Hotel, the Union League of Philadelphia, the Witherspoon Building, and the Oaks Cloister, his home and studio.

In 1901, Huston won the design competition for the new Pennsylvania State Capitol over eight other competitors. His submission was controversial since he was a member of the Philadelphia chapter of the American Institute of Architects and they had forbidden their members from entering the contest. He was one of five people convicted of graft in 1910 after a state investigation of cost overruns in the construction and furnishing of the capitol. He served 6 months in prison before being paroled in 1911. He partnered with Stanford Lewis in the firm Lewis & Huston which operated from 1920 to 1929.

== Early life and education ==
Huston was born in Philadelphia, Pennsylvania, February 23, 1866. He was the fifth of six children born to Irish immigrants. At eight years old, he worked for John B. Ellison and Sons. When he was seventeen, he joined the architectural firm of Frank Furness and Sons, where he worked during his college years. He graduated from Princeton University in 1892.

== Career ==
He rejoined Furness and Sons and worked on the design of Pennsylvania Railroad's Broad Street Station.

In 1895, Huston founded his own firm, and began designing buildings in Philadelphia, such as the Witherspoon Building, (1895). In 1898, Huston went on a world tour with his older brother, Samuel. The European styles influenced his later designs. He visited St. Peter's Basilica in Rome and commented in his notebook, "one day I hope to build a building as grand".

His firm worked on several important structures including the Benjamin Franklin Bridge, the Monmouth Hotel, and the Union League of Philadelphia.

=== Pennsylvania State Capitol ===
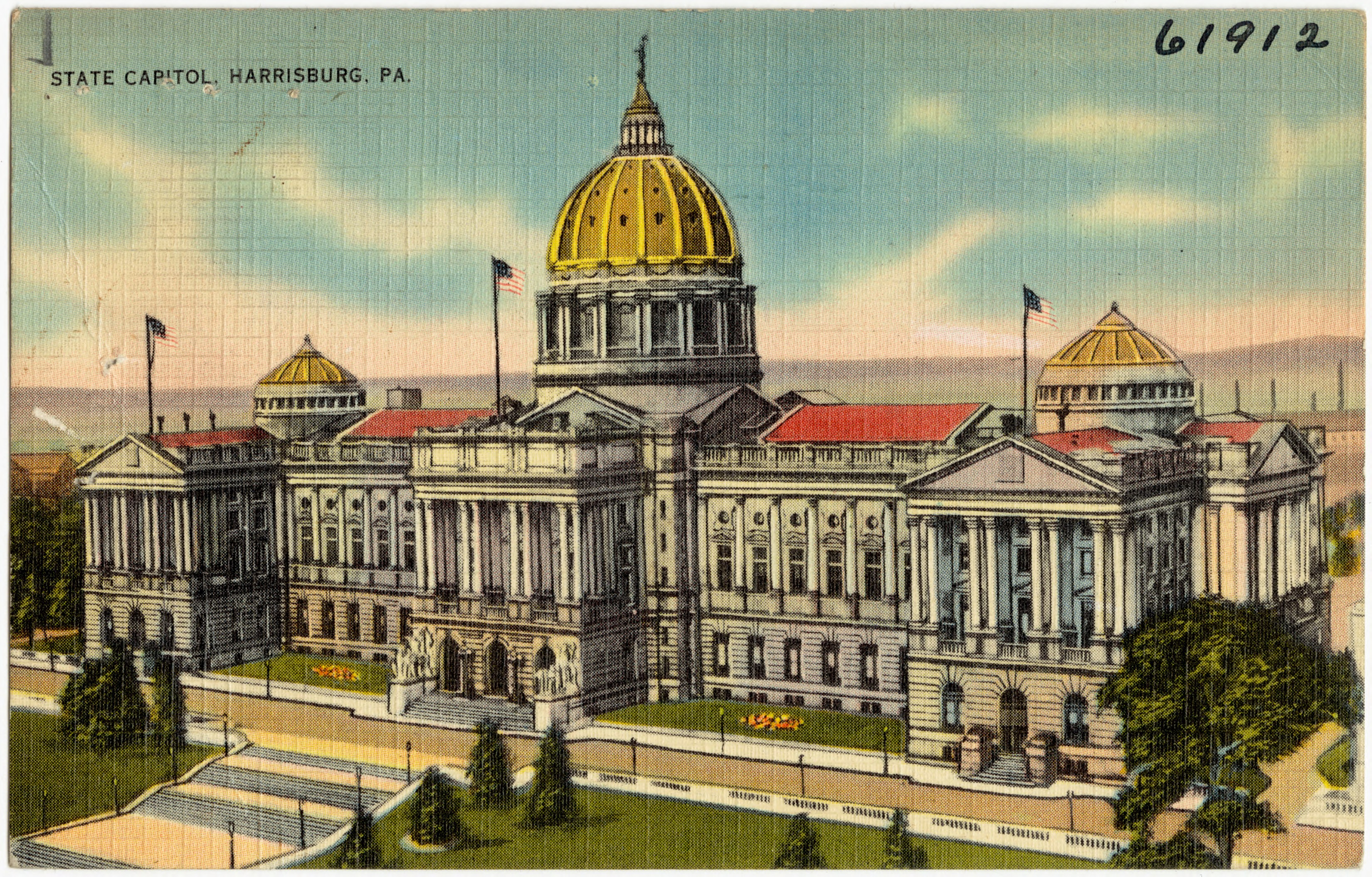
An illustration of the Pennsylvania State Capitol in Harrisburg

In 1901, at the age of 36, Huston won the design competition for the commission for the new Pennsylvania State Capitol over eight other competitors. His submission to the contest was controversial since he was a member of the Philadelphia chapter of the American Institute of Architects and they had forbidden their members from entering the contest.

His design was overwhelmingly heralded as a success. At its dedication on October 4, 1906, President Theodore Roosevelt described the building as, "... the handsomest State Capitol I ever saw!" The total cost of the project was nearly triple what the legislature had appropriated, in part because of inflated costs for construction and furnishings due to the state's purchasing mechanism. Huston, and four other officials were convicted of graft in 1910 and sentenced to up to two years in prison for their parts in the overruns. Although he appealed, Huston lost his case and went to the Eastern State Penitentiary in 1911. He served six months and 20 days in prison and was paroled on December 20, 1911. He returned to his architectural business but struggled with legal trouble.

=== Oaks Cloister ===
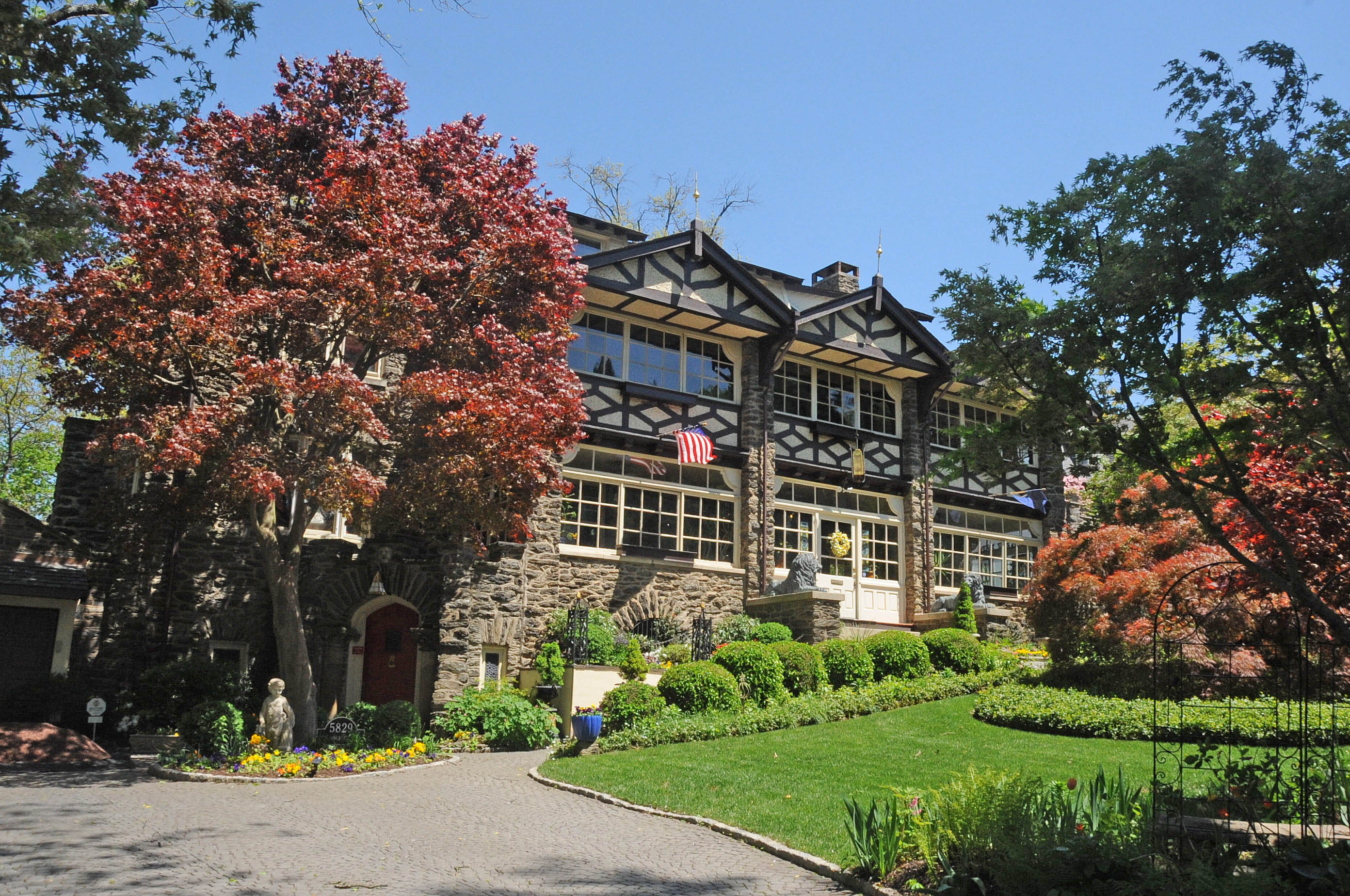
Oaks Cloister, Huston's home in the Germantown section of Philadelphia, has been described as one of the city's finest residences.

Huston's home, known as Oaks Cloister and built around 1904, is located in the Germantown section of Philadelphia and has been described as one of the finest residences in the city. The Huston family sold the property in 1955 and it fell into disrepair over time and ultimately was abandoned. This venerable landmark was saved from demolition in 2002 by Dr. Russell Harris and Mr. John Casavecchia, who spent the following decade restoring the mansion to its original glory.

In 1911, Huston designed the Searles Memorial Methodist Church, now located in the Old Pottstown Historic District.

In 1920, he partnered with Stanford Lewis in the architectural firm Lewis & Huston which operated from 1920 to 1929. Huston retired in 1930.

He was a member of the Union League of Philadelphia, the Merion Cricket Club, and the Princeton Club of Philadelphia. He was an active member of the Republican Party, he spoke at several conventions and campaigned for William McKinley in Pennsylvania.

Huston died on November 16, 1940, and was interred at West Laurel Hill Cemetery, in Bala Cynwyd, Pennsylvania.

== Personal life ==
Huston married Matilde Lewis MacGregor on May 1, 1901.
