= Pennsylvania State Capitol =

Capitol building of the U.S. state of Pennsylvania

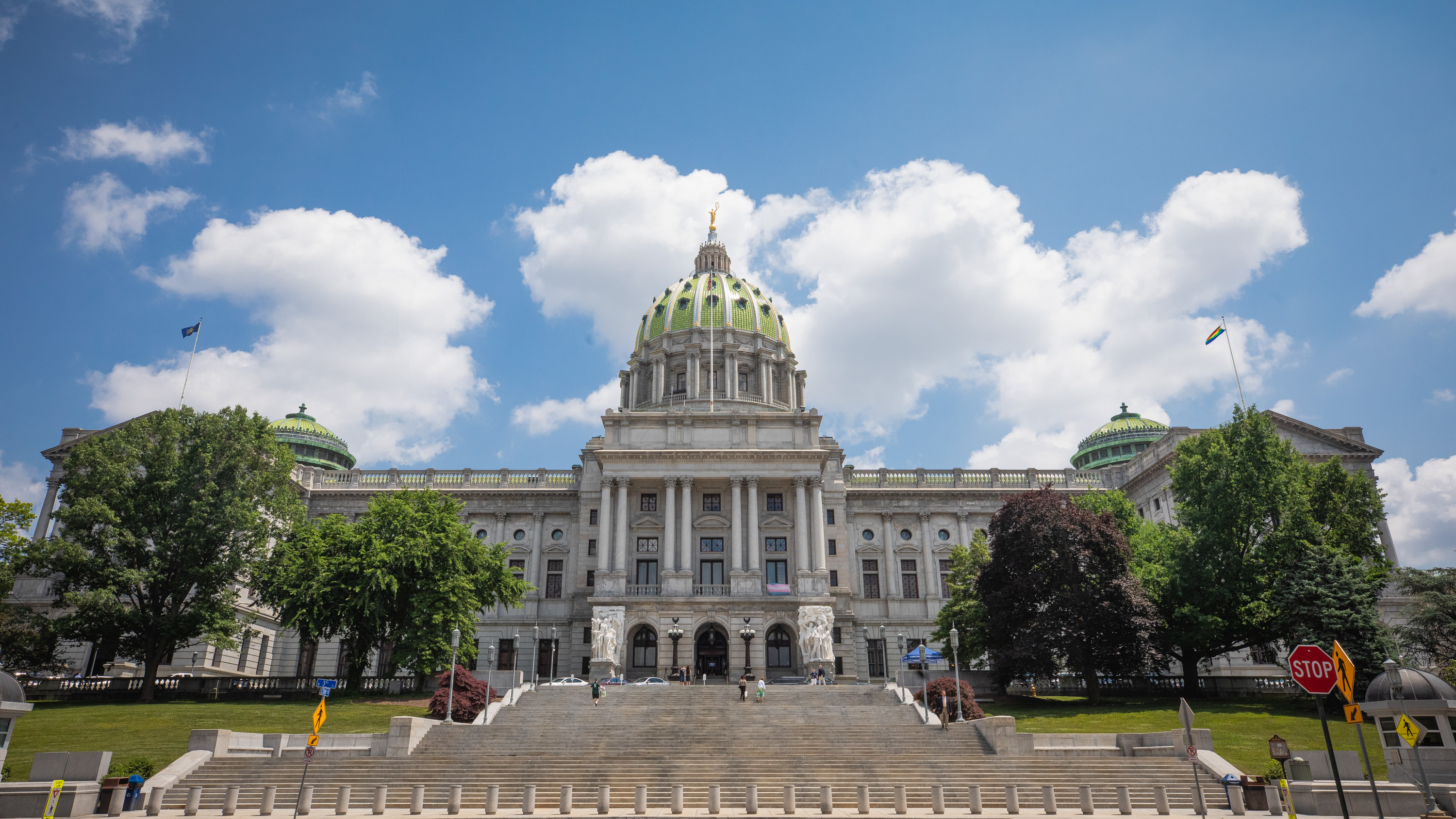
- West side of the Pennsylvania State Capitol in 2020

General information
- Architectural style: Beaux-Arts, Renaissance Revival
- Location: 3rd and State Streets; Harrisburg, Pennsylvania; United States
- Coordinates: 40°15′52″N 76°53′01″W
- Construction started: November 7, 1902; 123 years ago
- Completed: August 15, 1906; 120 years ago
- Inaugurated: October 4, 1906; 120 years ago
- Cost: US$13 million
- Client: Commonwealth of Pennsylvania
- Owner: Commonwealth of Pennsylvania

Height
- Height: 272 ft (83 m)

Technical details
- Floor area: 629,898 sq ft (58,519 m^{2})

Design and construction
- Architect: Joseph Miller Huston

U.S. National Register of Historic Places
- Official name: State Capitol Building, Pennsylvania
- Designated: September 14, 1977
- Reference no.: 77001162

U.S. National Historic Landmark
- Designated: September 20, 2006

U.S. National Historic Landmark District – Contributing property
- Designated: February 27, 2013
- Part of: Pennsylvania State Capitol Complex
- Reference no.: 13000287

The Pennsylvania State Capitol is the seat of government for the U.S. state of Pennsylvania located in downtown Harrisburg. The building was designed by architect Joseph Miller Huston in 1902 and completed in 1906 in a Beaux-Arts style with decorative Renaissance themes throughout. The capitol houses the legislative chambers for the Pennsylvania General Assembly, made up of the House of Representatives and the Senate, and the Harrisburg chambers for the Supreme and Superior Courts of Pennsylvania, as well as the offices of the Governor and the Lieutenant Governor. It is also the main building of the Pennsylvania State Capitol Complex.

The seat of government for the state was initially in Philadelphia, then was relocated to Lancaster in 1799 and finally to Harrisburg in 1812. The current capitol, known as the Huston Capitol, is the third state capitol building built in Harrisburg. The first, the Hills Capitol, was destroyed in 1897 by a fire. The second, the Cobb Capitol, was left unfinished when funding was discontinued in 1899.

President Theodore Roosevelt attended the building's dedication in 1906. After its completion, the capitol project was the subject of a graft scandal. The construction and subsequent furnishing cost three times more than the General Assembly had appropriated for the design and construction; architect Joseph Huston and four others were convicted of graft for price gouging.

The Pennsylvania State Capitol is often referred to as a "palace of art" because of its many sculptures, murals, and stained-glass windows, most of which are Pennsylvania-themed or Pennsylvanian-made. The building was listed on the National Register of Historic Places in 1977 and designated a National Historic Landmark in 2006; the boundaries of the designation were expanded to include the Capitol Complex in 2013 with the capitol as a contributing property.

== History ==
=== Earlier capitols ===
William Penn formed the first government of what was then the Province of Pennsylvania, in British America, on October 28, 1682, in Chester, Pennsylvania. The government did not have a regular meeting place and often met in Quaker meeting houses or at private residences in Philadelphia. Andrew Hamilton and William Allen were authorized to acquire land in Philadelphia for the Pennsylvania State House, which is now known as Independence Hall, the first statehouse. Construction on it began in 1732 and was completed in 1753.

With both the Pennsylvania General Assembly and three predecessors of the modern Congress of the United States, the First and Second Continental Congresses and the Confederation Congress, occupying Independence Hall from 1774 to 1789, the state legislature considered proposals for moving the seat of the state government. John Harris Jr. offered to give 4 acres (2 ha) and 13 square perches (3,539 ft^{2}; 329 m^{2}) of land near the banks of the Susquehanna River in central Pennsylvania to the state, provided that it be eventually used as the site of the capital. Harris also laid out a city in 1785, near his plot of land, and named it in honor of his father. In 1799, the legislature voted to relocate the capital to Lancaster instead of Harrisburg, because of Lancaster's greater population. From 1799 to 1812, the legislature resided in Lancaster with meetings in the county courthouse and with state offices located in what is now known as Old City Hall.

=== Hills Capitol ===
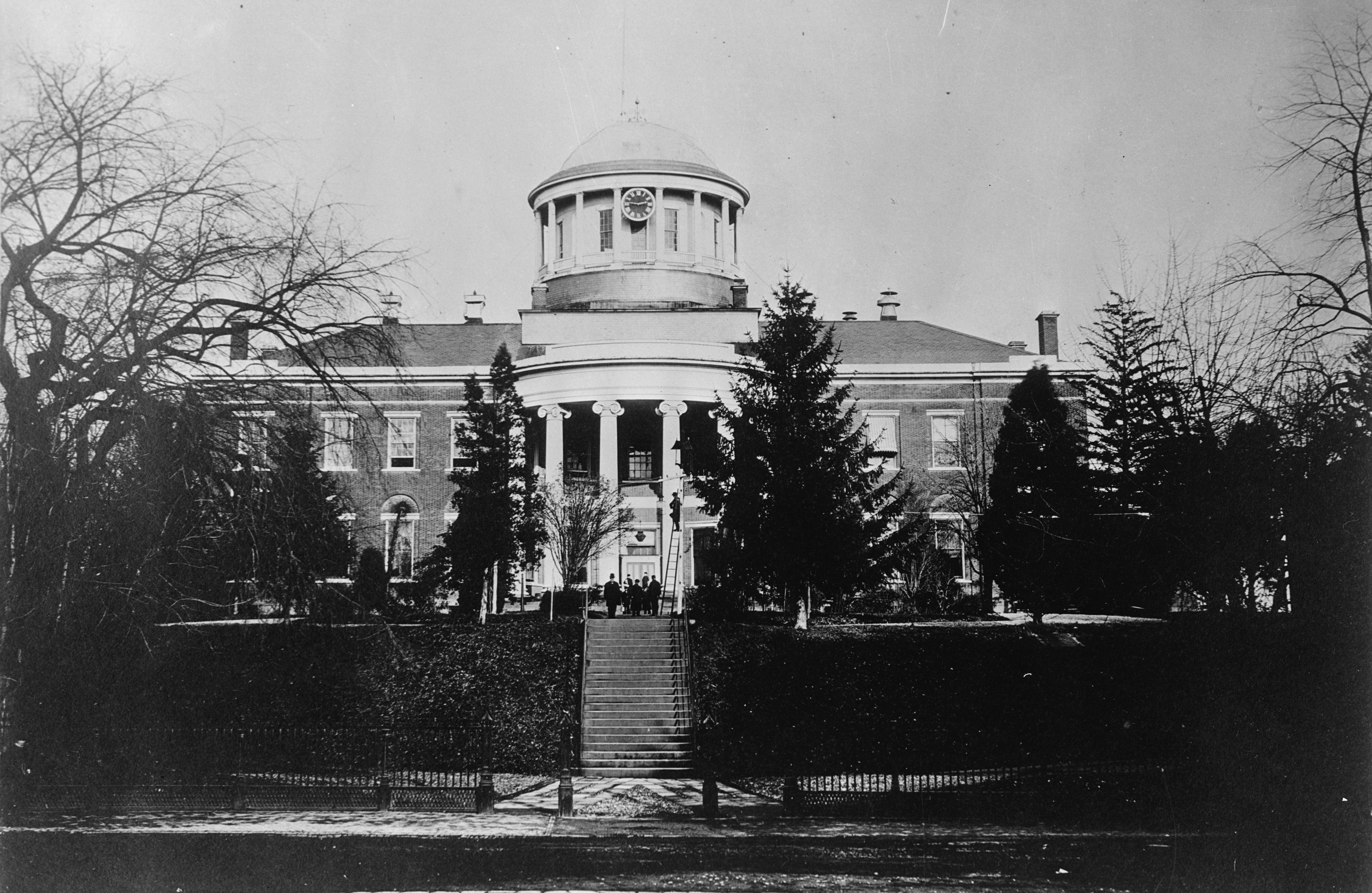
Hills Capitol (1822–1897)

The legislature voted in 1810 to relocate the capital again and moved the seat of government to Harrisburg in October 1812 onto the land originally given by Harris a decade earlier. An additional 10 acres (4 ha) was also purchased from United States Senator William Maclay. The legislature met in the old Dauphin County courthouse for the next decade until a new capitol was constructed. A competition was held to determine the design of the capitol starting in 1816, which "was the first formal contest for [designing] an American statehouse." The designs submitted, including one from William Strickland, were rejected as being too expensive. Another contest was started in January 1819. Of the seventeen designs submitted, two were selected as semifinalists. One was from Harrisburg architect Stephen Hills, and the other was from the designer of the Washington Monument, Robert Mills; Hills' design was selected. Hills had designed a "red-brick, Federal-style" capitol to "architecturally represent the function of democratic government."

Construction began on the Hills Capitol in 1819, and it was completed in 1822. The capitol's construction and subsequent furnishing were estimated to have cost $244,500. The Hills Capitol was visited by prominent people of the 19th century, including the French nobleman and Revolutionary War general the Marquis de Lafayette in 1825 and the then-Prince of Wales Albert Edward (later King Edward VII) in 1860. Abraham Lincoln visited the capitol in February 1861 as president-elect while traveling from Illinois to his inauguration in Washington, D.C., and then to lie in state in April 1865 during the trip back to Illinois for burial after his assassination. Pennsylvania's collection of Civil War battle flags, which were accumulated in 1866, was moved from the nearby State Arsenal to the second floor of the capitol in 1872. The flags were moved, again, in 1895 to the Executive, Library, and Museum Building. On February 2, 1897, smoke was discovered from the Lieutenant Governor's offices around noon. By early evening, the Hills Capitol had been reduced to a "smoldering mass of debris".

=== Cobb Capitol ===
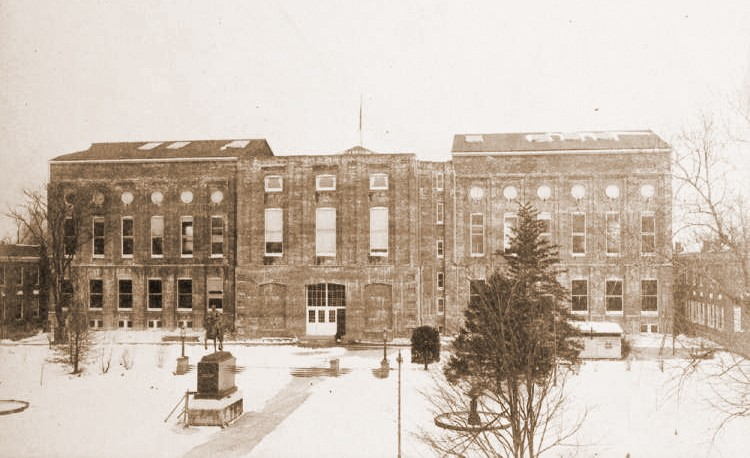
Cobb Capitol (1899–1902)

After the destruction of the Hills Capitol, the now "homeless" legislature moved to a nearby Methodist Church. There were soon demands that the capital be relocated to Pittsburgh or Philadelphia; the legislature quickly appropriated money to build a new capitol in Harrisburg. Governor Daniel H. Hastings opted for a pay-as-you-go policy to allow the construction costs to be spread over multiple annual budgets. Governor Hastings also figured that $550,000 was enough to build "a small legislative building" that could be added onto as needed over time. After building designs were submitted by various architects in another competition, Henry Ives Cobb was chosen in 1897 to design the new capitol. Construction of the Cobb Capitol began on May 2, 1898. The legislature met in the finished building, which they had deemed complete, even though it was an "unadorned, unfinished, several-story brown brick structure that looked like a factory" on January 3, 1899. Cobb himself described the building simply as "ugly" but believed that he would be able to finish it eventually when more funding became available.

=== Huston Capitol ===
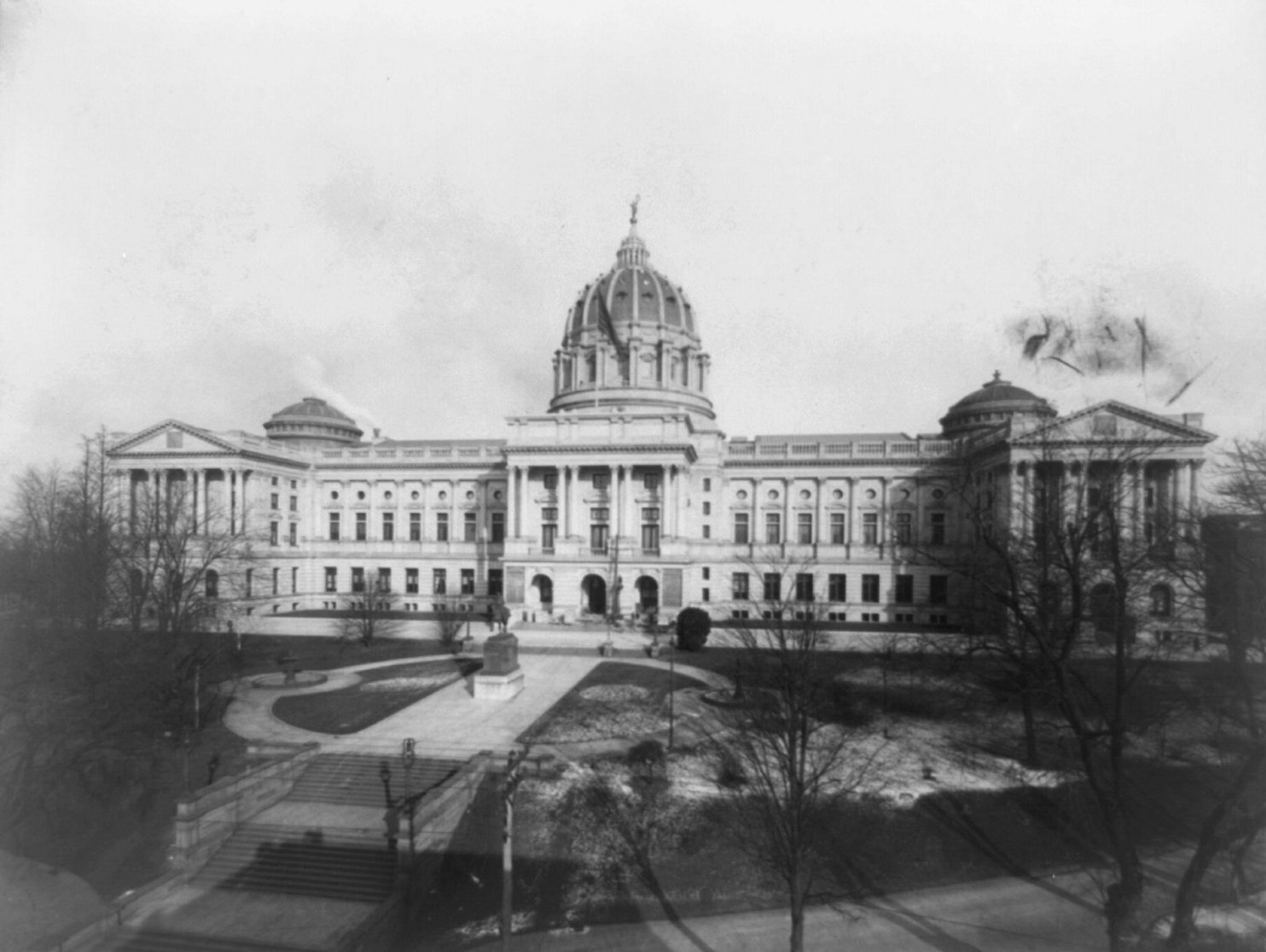
The capitol building, photographed by William H. Rau shortly after its dedication

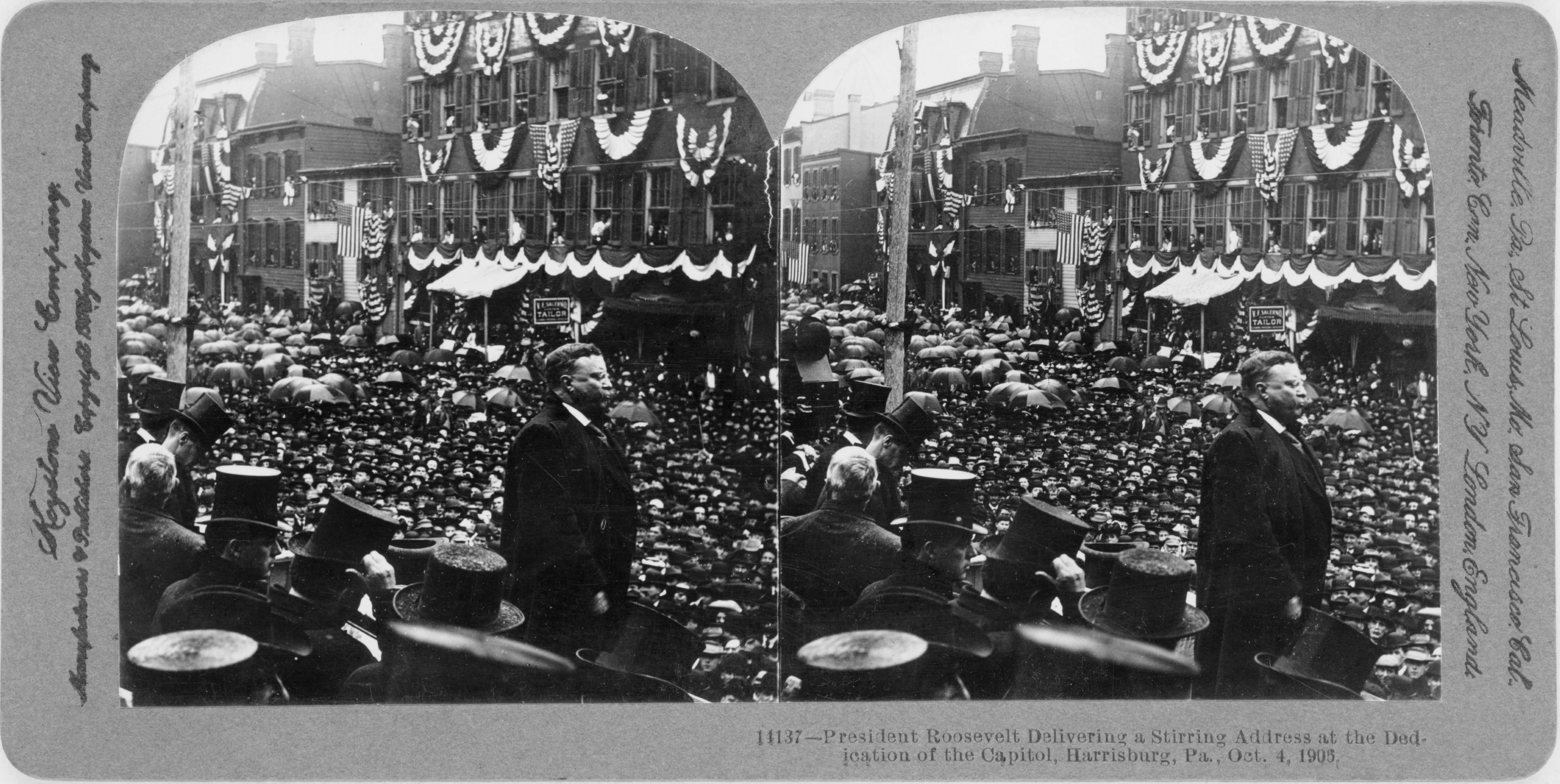
Stereo card of President Theodore Roosevelt at the dedication of the Huston Capitol in 1906

Governor William A. Stone appointed a new Capitol Building Commission in 1901. The commission then held another design competition for Pennsylvania architects only, which prevented Cobb, a Chicagoan, from submitting a design or finishing his capitol. The Building Commission also stipulated that parts of the unfinished, current capitol were to be used in the new capitol. The General Assembly had appropriated $4 million for the construction of the capitol. It did not limit the total amount to be used in furnishing the building. This caused problems after the construction completion of the capitol. The American Institute of Architects was opposed to competition, citing that the terms of the competition were "calculated to only 'encourage favoritism and injustice' and that they in no way obligated the Capitol [Building] Commission to select the best design or the best architect." The Institute also advised that no Pennsylvania architects enter the competition; Philadelphia architect Addison Hutton was subsequently expelled from the organization after submitting an entry. Joseph Miller Huston's design was chosen from nine entries in the competition when the commission voted on December 28, 1901.

The ground was broken for the Huston Capitol on November 2, 1902, but the cornerstone was not laid until May 5, 1904. Ownership of the capitol was handed over to the state government on August 15, 1906, and the Capitol Building Commission was dissolved.

Governor Samuel W. Pennypacker dedicated the new capitol on October 4, 1906. Former Governor Stone, who had become president of the Building Commission after leaving office, ceremoniously gave the key to the capitol to Governor Pennypacker. President Theodore Roosevelt, who had arrived earlier that morning by a special train to deliver a speech and tour the new capitol, declared it "the handsomest building I ever saw." The Pennsylvania, Northern Central, Reading, and Cumberland Valley railroads each ran special trains to accommodate the crowds traveling to and from Harrisburg for the dedication.

Although the building was completed, most of the artwork in and around the capitol would not be completed for another two decades. The murals in the rotunda were not installed until 1908, and the sculptures outside the entrance to the capitol were dedicated on October 4, 1911. The collection of Civil War flags were removed from the Executive, Library, and Museum Building. After a parade and a ceremony, they were installed in glass display cases in the capitol rotunda on June 14, 1914. The decoration of the capitol was completed on May 23, 1927, when the murals in the Supreme Court Chambers were unveiled.

==== Graft scandal ====
William H. Berry was elected in 1906, shortly after the dedication, to the office of State Treasurer on a reform "fusion ticket". Berry was the only Democrat elected to a statewide office from 1895 to 1934. Governor Pennypacker deemed his successful campaign to be "one of those freaks of ill fortune". Berry began investigating the costs of the capitol project and brought its $13 million price tag to the attention of the public. Part of the reason for the discrepancy was Pennsylvania's "over-elaborate" and sometimes "unintelligible" method of "ordering and purchasing supplies, equipment [and] furnishings, commonly called the 'per-foot rule' ." Because the methods of measuring under the "per-foot rule" were not rigorously enforced, furnishing could be intentionally overpriced by the supplier. For example, a flagpole installed on the capitol roof was priced at $850; Berry estimated the value of the pole to have been only $150. Other expenses included $1,619 for a $125 bootblack stand and $3,257 for a $325 "mahogany case in the Senate barber shop".

Pennypacker tried to demonstrate that costs associated with the capitol were reasonable in comparison with similar notable structures. He pointed out that the United States Capitol cost $18 million, but had "fifty-five less [rooms] than the Capitol at Harrisburg." Pennypacker also showed how the New York State Capitol had cost $24 million, and was still unfinished. After an investigation, a total of five people, including Huston, were convicted on December 18, 1908, and sentenced to two years in prison for "conspiring with State officials to defraud the State in the erection and furnishing of the Capitol." The Superintendent of Public Ground and Buildings James Shumaker and Auditor General William Preston Snyder were also convicted. Among the convicted, John H. Sanderson and William L. Mathues died before going to prison.

==== Brunner plan ====
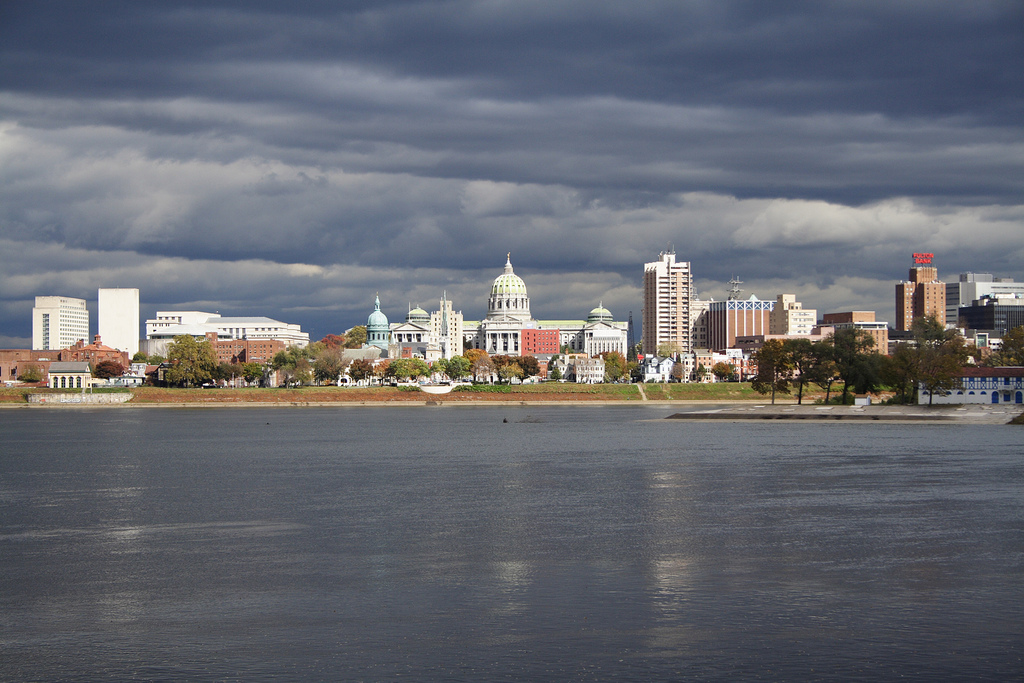
The skyline of Harrisburg seen from the Susquehanna River, with the capitol dome in the center

From 1912 to 1917, the state acquired all of the 541 separate properties that comprise the Eighth Ward east of the capitol. The Eighth Ward was situated between the capitol and a set of railroad tracks, then owned by the Pennsylvania Railroad. Arnold Brunner was hired in 1916 to develop new accommodations for state government, which had already outgrown the capitol. He introduced his plan in 1920, which called, first, for the demolition of the Eighth Ward. Brunner planned two office buildings behind the capitol, the North and South Office Buildings, and these were separated by a courtyard he named the People's Court. The South Office Building was completed in 1921. The leveling of the Eighth Ward was finished in 1925.

Although Brunner died on February 14, 1925, elements of his plans were still completed, except for his People's Court, which became a parking lot. Brunner planned a bridge to cross the railroad tracks and connect the capitol with the highest point in the city at 13th Street. Brunner had also originally planned to have another bridge span the Susquehanna River, on the west side of the capitol. After his death, parts of the bridge were redesigned and became the current State Street Bridge, which was completed in 1930. The Education Building, or Forum Building, was completed in 1931.

==== Restoration and preservation ====
The Pennsylvania Historical and Museum Commission erected two historical markers on August 11, 1953—one commemorating the Hills Capitol and another for the current capitol. The capitol was listed on the National Register of Historic Places on September 14, 1977. In 1982, the Capitol Preservation Committee (CPC) was created "to supervise and coordinate the historic preservation of the State Capitol Building". One of the CPC's first projects was the preservation of the 390 Civil War flags and 22 flags from the Spanish–American War, which had been undisturbed since being placed in the rotunda in 1914. Between 1985 and 1987, scaffolding was erected in the rotunda and the murals were removed for restoration. The statue atop the capitol dome was removed for restoration via helicopter in the summer of 1998, and returned in September of the same year. It was decided to restore the Senate Chamber after it was flooded with 26,000 US gallons (98,000 L; 22,000 imp gal) of water on February 14, 1999. The capitol was declared a National Historic Landmark on September 20, 2006, during its centennial. On February 27, 2013, the boundaries of the designation were revised to encompass the grounds and surrounding buildings in the Capitol Complex. Restoration of the capitol back to its original 1906 condition was completed in May 2022 when the restoration on the governor's office was finished after Governor Tom Wolf relocated to the Pennsylvania Emergency Management Agency during the COVID-19 pandemic.

== Exterior ==
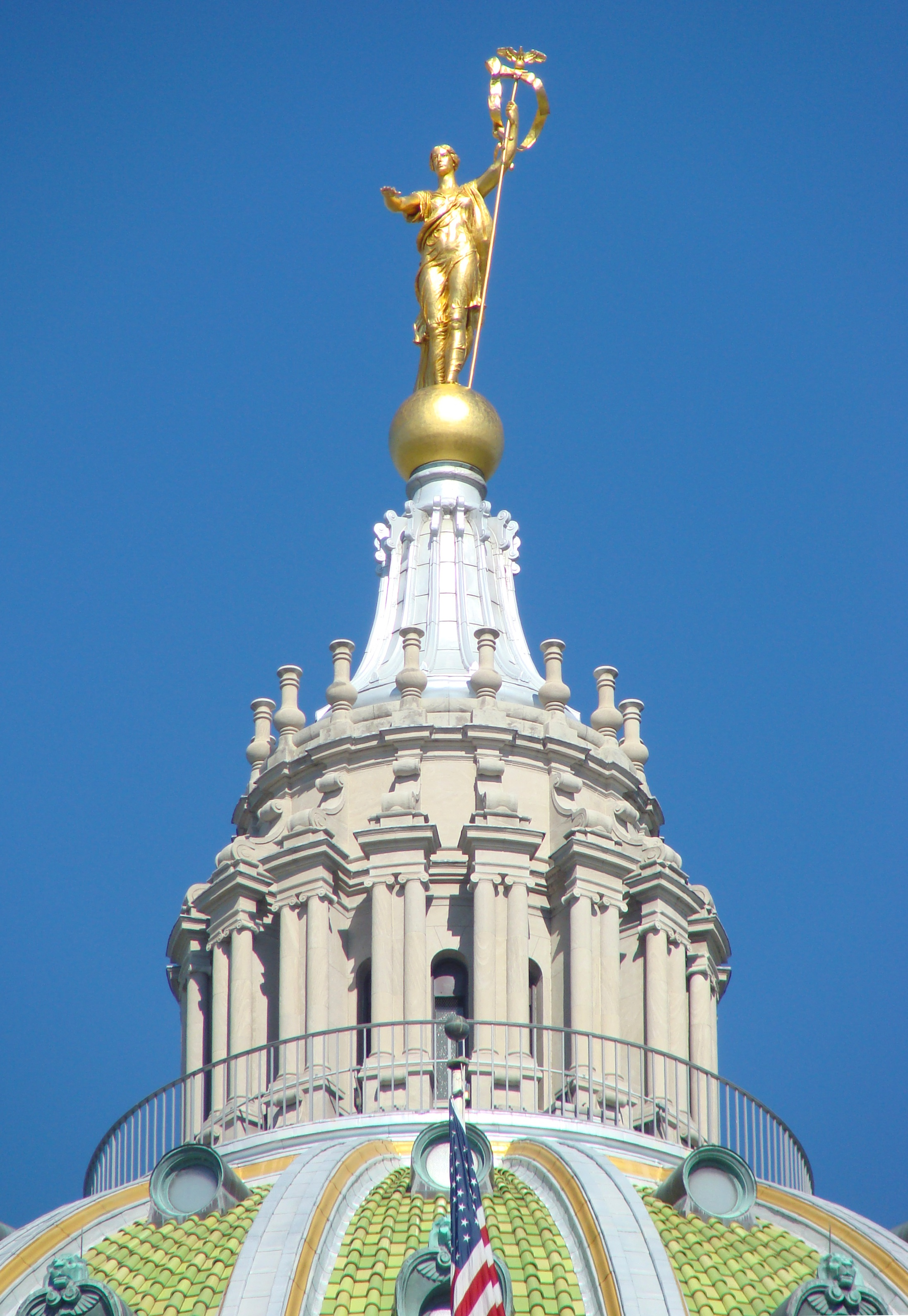
The lantern of the dome, topped with the statue Commonwealth by Roland Hinton Perry, 1905

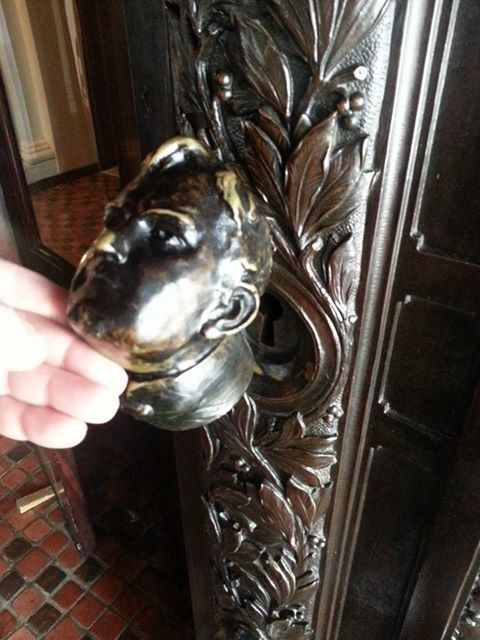
Bust of Joseph Miller Huston over the Capitol's keyhole

The capitol is 520 feet (160 m) long and 272 feet (83 m) tall. It is 254 feet (77 m) wide at its center wing and its two side wings are 212 feet (65 m). The facade of the capitol is constructed out of granite from Hardwick, Vermont. The 94-foot-diameter (29 m) dome is topped by the gilded brass statue of Commonwealth by Roland Hinton Perry. Standing 14 feet 6 inches (4 m) tall atop a 4-foot-diameter (1 m) ball, the statue is the personification of a commonwealth. The dome features bright green Ludowici tiles and weighs 26,000 short tons (24,000 metric tons) and was architecturally inspired by St. Peter's Basilica in Vatican City.

Huston designed the large bronze doors at the capitol's main entrance. They were modeled by sculptor Otto Jahnsen and were both cast in one piece using the lost wax method of casting by the Henry Bonnard Bronze Company. The doors are decorated with scenes from the history of Pennsylvania, such as the arrival of William Penn and his peace treaty with the Lenape. Busts of people who were important in the construction of the capitol, like Governor Pennypacker, Boies Penrose, and Matthew Quay, decorate the edges of the doors; the bust of Huston hides the doors' keyhole.

The entrance is flanked by two sculpture groups, entitled Love and Labor: The Unbroken Law and The Burden of Life: The Broken Law. Both were sculpted out of Carrara marble by the Piccirilli Brothers from models created by George Grey Barnard. The sculptures created controversy when they were installed at the Capitol in 1911 due to Barnard's use of nudity; marble "blurs" were added to the male figures before the sculptures were dedicated on October 4, 1911.

=== Grounds ===
The Pennsylvania Capitol Grounds, officially the Capitol Park, comprises 45 acres (18 ha) and 26.4 square perches (7,187 ft^{2}; 668 m^{2}). The grounds are bounded by North Street on the north, 7th Street on the east, Walnut Street on the south and 3rd Street on the west. Arnold Brunner designed the layout of the grounds, which originally totaled only 15 acres (6 ha) from the land Harris and Maclay gave to the state. The remaining 29 acres (12 ha) were added when the state bought the Eighth Ward.

A 64-foot-tall (20 m) monument, dedicated to the citizens of Pennsylvania who died in the Mexican–American War, was built in 1858. The monument was not placed onto the grounds until 1868 and was moved to the southeast corner of the grounds in 1893 when the Executive, Library, and Museum Building was built. In 1896–97, a monument, dedicated to former governor John F. Hartranft, was sculpted by Frederick Ruckstull. The 26-foot-tall (8 m) monument was unveiled on May 18, 1899, and was placed in front of the capitol. It was moved in 1927 to in front of the Executive, Library, and Museum Building. Friends of Penrose in the General Assembly, who had died in 1921, passed legislation for a memorial to Penrose. The 16-foot-tall (5 m) monument was dedicated on September 23, 1930, and is located near the corner of North 3rd and Walnut Streets.

== Interior ==
The interior of the dome from the rotunda floor. Medallions, clockwise from top-left: Science, Religion, Justice, and Art. Lunettes, clockwise from top: Spirit of Vulcan, Science Revealing the Treasures of the Earth, Spirit of Light, and Spirit of Religious Liberty.

The Pennsylvania State Capitol houses the chambers for the Pennsylvania House of Representatives, the Pennsylvania Senate, the Harrisburg chambers for the Supreme Court of Pennsylvania, and the office for the Governor of Pennsylvania. The Capitol contains 475 rooms and has four floors, not including a mezzanine between the first and second floors, and a basement. The bronze entrance doors of the capitol lead into the rotunda on the first floor with the grand staircase in the center. The staircase in the rotunda is an imperial staircase, similar to the one in the Palais Garnier in Paris, France. The staircase leads to the mezzanine between the first and second floors before dividing into two staircases leading to the second floor. Both legislative chambers are on the second floor each with an entrance on the third and fourth floors leading to the press and media galleries. The Supreme Court chamber is located on the fourth floor of the capitol, on the east side of the rotunda.

Edwin Austin Abbey painted four allegorical medallions around the base of the capitol dome, detailing the "four forces of civilization": Art, Justice, Science, and Religion. Four lunette murals were also painted by Abbey and "symbolize Pennsylvania's spiritual and industrial contributions to modern civilization." The lunettes are situated in the recesses of each arch in the rotunda. The rotunda is paved with tiles, hand-crafted by Henry Chapman Mercer, from the Moravian Pottery and Tile Works. Mercer produced 16,000 square feet (1,500 m^{2}) of tile, which includes 420 mosaics depicting the "principal animals, birds, fishes, and insects native in the State, as well as the leading industries and occupations of the people". The interiors of the rotunda and the dome are inscribed with a quote from William Penn made upon the foundation of the Commonwealth of Pennsylvania:

There may be room there for such a holy experiment. For the nations want a precedent. And my God will make it the seed of a nation. That an example may be set up to the nations. That we may do the thing that is truly wise and just.

=== House Chamber ===
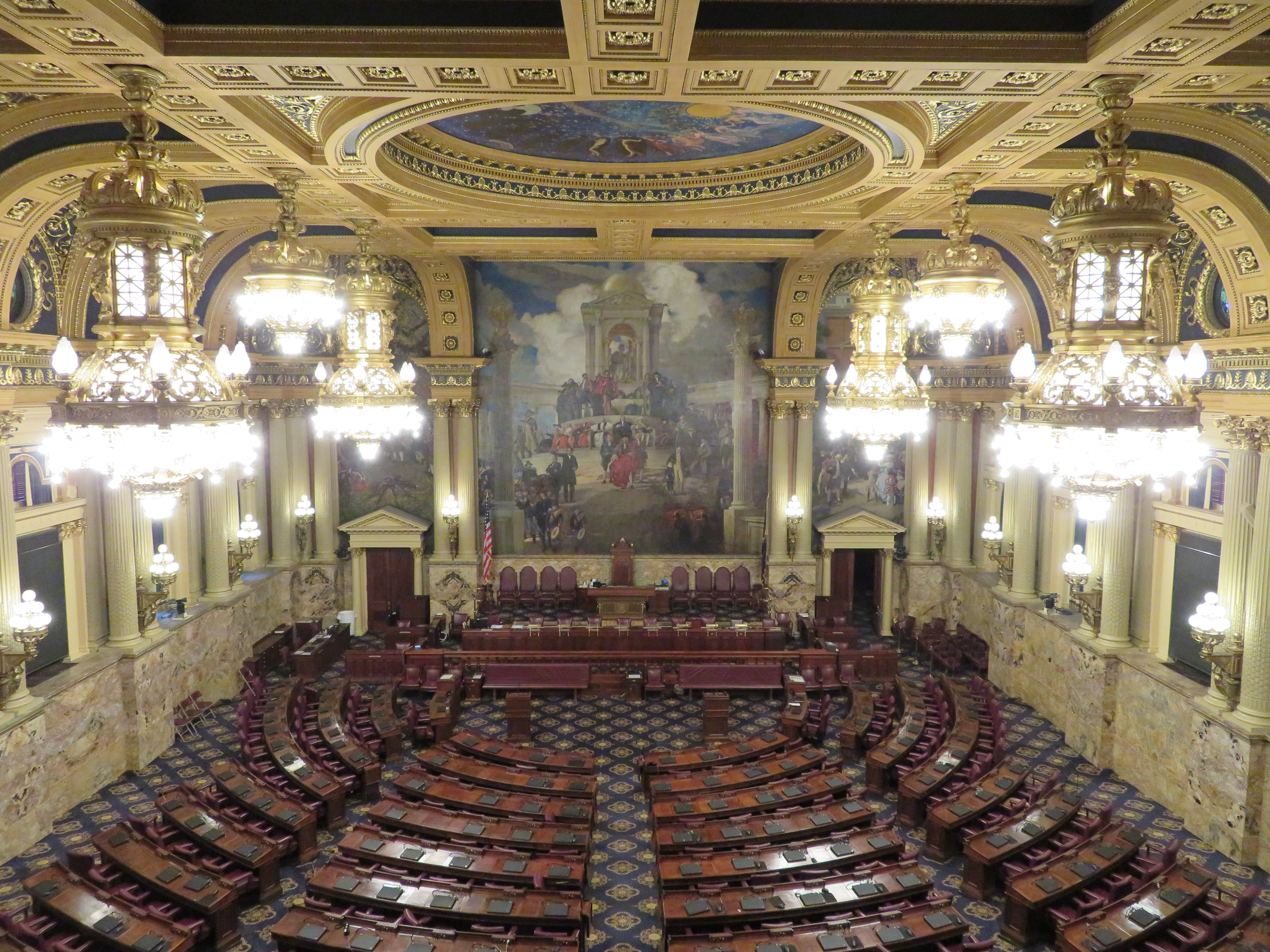
The chamber of the Pennsylvania House of Representatives and the painting Apotheosis of Pennsylvania, visible on the far wall of the chamber, seen from the chamber's gallery

The lower house of the bicameral General Assembly, the House of Representatives, has 203 members, elected for a term of two years, and presided over by the Speaker of the House. The House Chamber, or Hall of the House, is the largest of the three chambers at 90 feet (30 m) wide and 120 feet (40 m) long. The floor is sloped from the second floor entrance, to enhance the acoustics, and descends 34 feet 4 inches (10.46 m) towards the Speaker's rostrum.

The House Chamber was designed with an Italian Renaissance theme. Marble paneling from the French Pyrenees extends 6 to 9 feet (1.8 to 2.7 m) from the floor along the sides of the chamber giving the room a cream and buff color scheme. William B. Van Ingen created the fourteen circular, stained-glass windows in the House Chamber, and Abbey painted its five murals. The largest of the murals, named the Apotheosis of Pennsylvania, is situated behind the Speaker's rostrum and depicts 28 famous Pennsylvanians.^{[a]}

=== Senate Chamber ===
The Senate is the upper house of the state legislature and has 50 members, elected to four-year terms. The Senate is presided over by the President of the Senate, who is also the Lieutenant Governor. The 95-by-80-foot (29 by 24 m) Senate Chamber, or Hall of the Senate, is the second-largest chamber and was designed with a French Renaissance theme. It is located on the north side of the rotunda, opposite the House. The color scheme of the chamber is green and gold, with Connemara marble paneling along the walls. Violet Oakley painted the murals in the Senate Chamber. Ingen also made ten stained-glass windows for the Senate Chamber.

=== Supreme Court Chamber ===
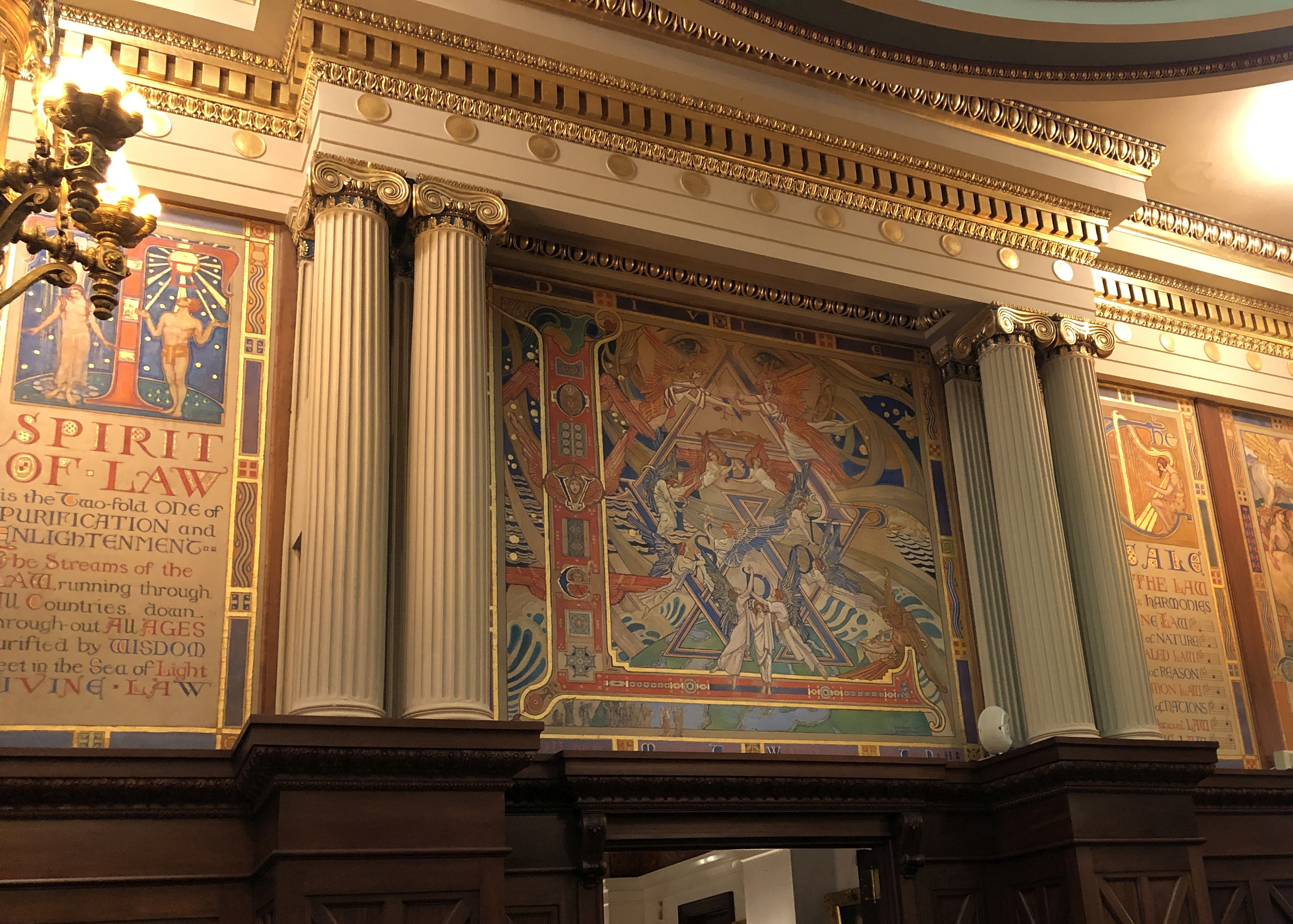
Divine Law, a mural by Violet Oakley in the Pennsylvania Supreme Court's chamber

The Supreme Court of Pennsylvania is the court of last resort in the Commonwealth. The Superior Court of Pennsylvania is one of two intermediate appellate courts in the state. The Supreme Court Chamber, officially the Supreme and Superior Court Chamber, is used by both courts and was designed using ancient Greek and Roman themes. The Supreme Court Chamber is the smallest of the three chambers at 42 by 72 feet (13 by 22 m).

Violet Oakley painted the 16 murals in the "Supreme Courtroom" to depict the history of law. The cycle of 16 panels, painted between 1917 and 1927, begins and ends with Divine Law as its keystone, over the main entrance. Around the room clockwise, the murals represent the Law of Nature; Greek, Hebrew, and Christian Revealed Law; Roman Law of Reason; English Common Law; William Penn as Law-Giver; State, National, and International law, and finally, the Spirit of Divine Law. A stained-glass dome, designed by Pennsylvania native Alfred Godwin, is in the center of the ceiling.

== Pennsylvania State Capitol Complex ==
The Pennsylvania State Capitol Complex includes the buildings owned by the Commonwealth, which are controlled by the Pennsylvania Department of General Services, and are centered on the capitol in Harrisburg. The Capitol Complex became a National Historic Landmark District in 2013 when the designation was revised to include not just the capitol, but the surrounding building as well. Contributing properties to the district include the Executive, Library, and Museum Building; the North and South Office buildings, the Finance and Forum buildings, and the State Street Bridge; excluded from the listing was the East Wing. The complex is protected by its own law enforcement agency, the Pennsylvania Capitol Police.

The oldest building in the complex is the Executive, Library, and Museum Building. Situated next to the Hills Capitol and the Huston Capitol, it was built in 1894. It was designated the Matthew J. Ryan Legislative Office Building on June 14, 1999, in recognition of former Speaker Matthew J. Ryan. The Ryan Office Building is the oldest building in the complex and was initially designed to house the State Library and State Museum of Pennsylvania, as well as the Governor's Office and Reception Room. Today it houses the offices of the members of the Pennsylvania House of Representatives.

The seven-story North and South Office Buildings are situated behind the capitol and overlook the East Wing. The South Office Building was renamed the K. Leroy Irvis Office Building on December 20, 2002, in recognition of former Speaker K. Leroy Irvis. The State Museum and State Archives buildings were constructed in 1964. A 640-by-320-foot (200 by 100 m) addition, called the East Wing, was dedicated on December 2, 1987. The East Wing replaced the decades-old parking lot and fulfilled Brunner's plan of a People's Court. It was built partially underground, such that the tallest point on the East Wing barely reaches the first floor of the capitol.

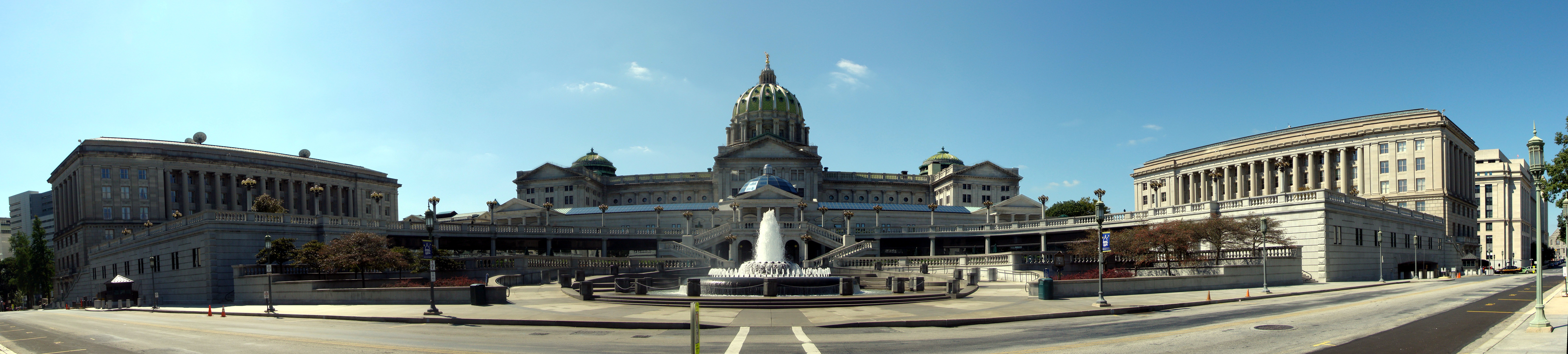
The East Wing of the Pennsylvania Capitol (1987), with the 1906 Capitol behind, the Irvis Office Building on the left, and the North Office Building on the right, as seen in September 2010

== See also ==
- Government of Pennsylvania
- List of National Historic Landmarks in Pennsylvania
- List of Pennsylvania state legislatures
- List of state and county courthouses in Pennsylvania
- List of state and territorial capitols in the United States
- List of tallest domes
- National Register of Historic Places listings in Dauphin County, Pennsylvania

== Notes ==
a. The 28 Pennsylvanians shown in the painting are: John Bartram and son William Bartram (counted as one), Daniel Boone, Andrew Curtin, George Mifflin Dallas, John Dickinson, Oliver Evans, Benjamin Franklin, Stephen Girard, Winfield Scott Hancock, Henry Hudson, Johannes Kelpius, Thomas McKean, George Meade, Peter Minuit, Robert Morris, John Peter Muhlenberg, Thomas Paine, Francis Pastorius, William Penn, Walter Raleigh, David Rittenhouse, Benjamin Rush, William Smith, Thaddeus Stevens, Anthony Wayne, William White, and Caspar Wistar.

== Sources ==
- 2000–2001 Annual Report (PDF) (Report). Harrisburg: Pennsylvania Capitol Preservation Committee. November 2001.
- Beers, Paul B. (1969). "Harrisburg: Pennsylvania's Capital City". Historic Pennsylvania Leaflet (9). Harrisburg: Pennsylvania Historical and Museum Commission.
- Caffin, Charles Henry (1906). Handbook of the New Capitol of Pennsylvania. Harrisburg: Mount Pleasant Press. hdl:2027/hvd.fl38y2.
- Colson, William Wyman (1906). The state capitol of Pennsylvania. Harrisburg: Telegraph Printing Company. hdl:2027/loc.ark:/13960/t6zw27x77.
- Dickson, Harold E. (Summer 1959). "Barnard's Sculptures for the Pennsylvania Capitol". The Art Quarterly. 22 (2): 127–147.
- Dunlevey, Charles (August 1973). State Capitol Building, Pennsylvania (PDF). National Register of Historic Places Inventory—Nomination Form (Report). National Archives and Records Administration.
- Ellis, Christopher R.; McClintic-Smith, Logan (April 14, 2010). Pennsylvania Capitol Complex. National Historic Landmark Nomination (Report). National Park Service.
- Landis, Charles I. (September 1918). "City Hall and its history". Papers Read Before the Lancaster County Historical Society. 22 (7). Lancaster: Lancaster County Historical Society: 107–122.
- Mercer, Henry Chapman (1910). Guide book to the tiled pavement in the capitol of Pennsylvania. Self-published.
- Hitchcock, Henry Russell; Seale, William (1976). Temples of Democracy: The State Capitols of the U.S.A. New York: Harcourt, Brace Jovanovich.
- Inglewood, Marian (1925). Then and Now in Harrisburg. Harrisburg: Minnie I. Etzweiler.
- Millard, Julian (1936). First Capitol Buildings (PDF). Historic American Buildings Survey (Report). Washington, D.C.: Library of Congress.
- Carson, Hampton (1907). Report and Official Opinions of the Attorney General of Pennsylvania. Harrisburg Publishing. hdl:2027/mdp.35112100984584.
- Hubbert-Kemper, Ruthann; Wilson, Jared L., eds. (2006). Literature in Stone: The Hundred Year History of Pennsylvania's State Capitol. Harrisburg: Pennsylvania Capitol Preservation Committee. ISBN 0-9643048-8-0.
- Pennypacker, Samuel W. (1911). The Desecration and Profanation of the Pennsylvania Capitol. Philadelphia: William J. Campbell.
- Price, Matlack (April 1923). "Capitol Park, Harrisburg, PA: Arnold W. Brunner, Architect". Architectural Record. 53 (295): 287–306. ISSN 0003-858X.
- Sauer, Richard A. (1987). Advance the Colors!: Pennsylvania Civil War Battle Flags. Vol. 1. Capitol Preservation Committee. ISBN 0-8182-0090-1.
- Schehr, Elizabeth, ed. (2006). The Pennsylvania Manual. Vol. 117. Harrisburg: Pennsylvania Department of General Services.
- Sheets, Georg R. (2002). A Sacred Challenge: Violet Oakley and the Pennsylvania Capital Murals. Harrisburg: Capitol Preservation Committee. ISBN 0964304864.
- The Capitol (PDF) (Report). Pennsylvania House of Representatives. 2007. Archived from the original (PDF) on January 15, 2009.
