= Unabomber (disambiguation) =

The Unabomber (Ted Kaczynski, 1942–2023) was an American domestic terrorist.

Unabomber may also refer to:

- Phil Laak or the Unabomber (born 1972), Irish poker player
- Manhunt: Unabomber, a 2017 television drama miniseries about the Unabomber
- Unabomber: The True Story, a 1996 telemovie biopic about the Unabomber
- Unabomber: In His Own Words, a 2020 TV docuseries about the Unabomber
- "The Unabombers", a pro-poker team led by Phil Leak on the TV poker show Poker Royale
- Unabomber, a 1999 EP by Macabre
- Unabomber, a 2026 Netflix American crime drama film

== See also ==
- Unabomber Manifesto (Industrial Society and Its Future), a 1996 essay by Ted Kaczynski
- Italian Unabomber (fl. 1990s), unidentified Italian bomber
- Unabomber for President, a 1996 political campaign
