= Anti-Tech Revolution =

2016 book by Ted Kaczynski

Anti-Tech Revolution: Why and How
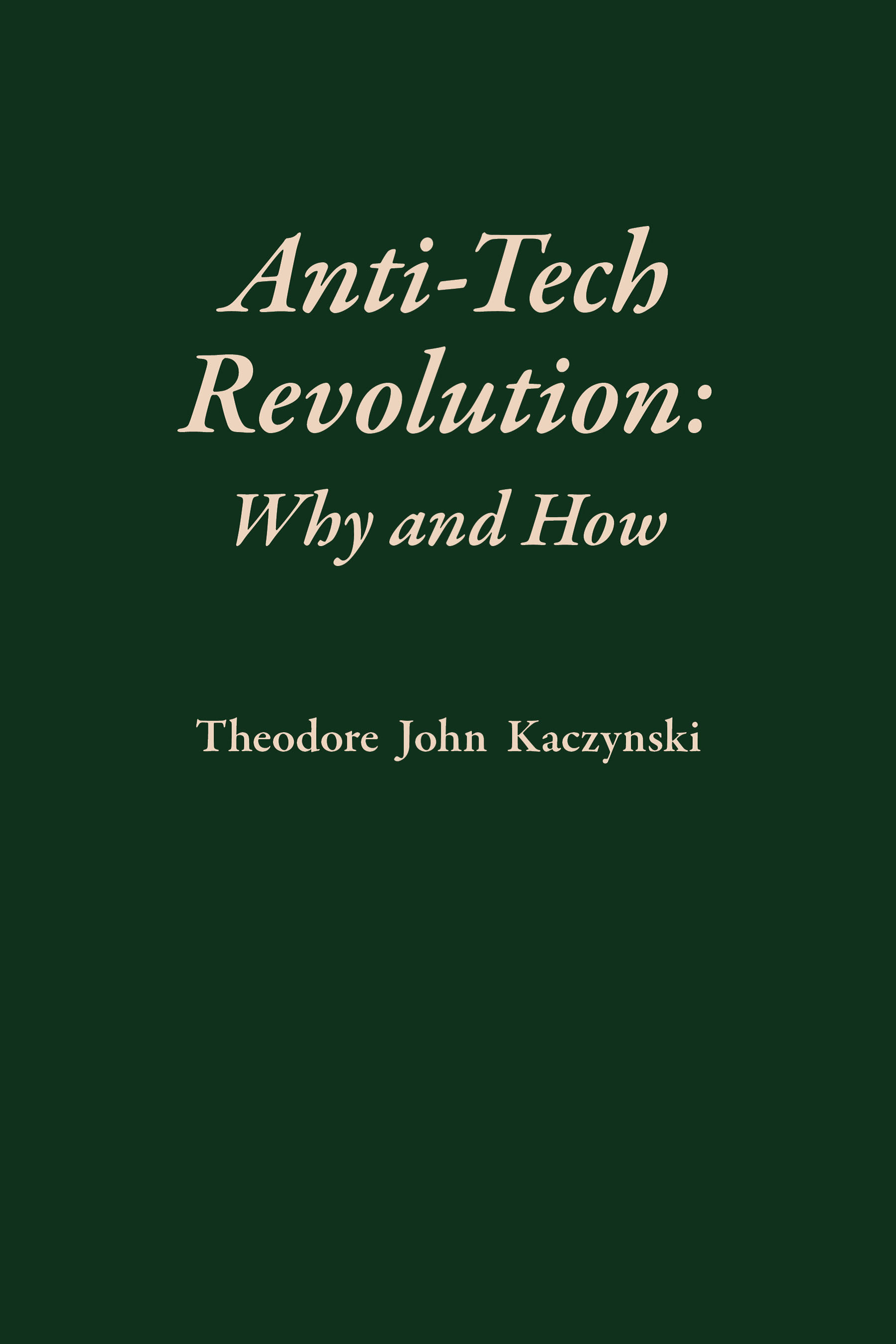
- First edition
- Author: Ted Kaczynski
- Language: English
- Subject: Criticism of technology
- Genre: Non-fiction
- Publisher: Fitch & Madison
- Publication place: United States

Anti-Tech Revolution: Why and How is a 2016 non-fiction book by Ted Kaczynski.

== Publication history ==
In 2016, the first edition was published. A second edition was published by Fitch & Madison in 2020.

== Book structure ==
There are four chapters and six appendices in the book:

Chapters:

1. The Development of a Society Can Never Be Subject to Rational Human Control
2. Why the Technological System Will Destroy Itself
3. How to Transform a Society: Errors to Avoid
4. Strategic Guidelines for an Anti-Tech Movement

Appendices:

1. In Support of Chapter One
2. In Support of Chapter Two
3. Stay on Target
4. The Long-Term Outcome of Geo-Engineering
5. Thurston's View of Stalin's Terror. State Terrorism in General.
6. The Teachings of Jesus Christ and Their Effect on Society

== Synopsis ==
This book is split up into two parts: The first two chapters of this book argue for the need for a revolution to bring about the end of the technological system, while the second two chapters detail how a movement against the technological system should organize itself to achieve its goal.

In Chapter 1 of this book, Kaczynski argues against the notion that humans can rationally steer the development of society for numerous reasons, including but not limited to: the problems of complexity, chaos, competition among groups that seek power under the influence of natural selection, issues in deciding leadership and what values should be prioritized, and problems of succession.

Chapter 2, "Why the Technological System Will Destroy Itself", develops the author’s theory of "self-propagating systems"—systems that compete against each other for power without any regard for the long-term consequences, since any self-propagating systems that take the long-term into account will lose their competitive edge and be out-competed by self-propagating systems that do not. Kaczynski ultimately argues that since the technological system itself is a self-propagating system composed of self-propagating subsystems that competes for power in the short-term without regard for the long-term negative consequences, that the logical conclusion of the continued growth of the technological system is the complete destruction of the biosphere, wiping out all complex lifeforms.

Chapters 3 and 4 provide guidelines for a movement that would seek to bring about the collapse of the technological system before its continued progression leads to a much larger disaster for humanity and the biosphere.

== Contents ==
=== Chapter 1: The Development of a Society Can Never Be Subject to Rational Human Control ===
The first chapter of the book presents various reasons why human societies cannot be subject to rational human control:

=== Chapter 2: Why the Technological System Will Destroy Itself ===
The second chapter of the book presents the following seven propositions:

- Proposition 1: In any environment that is sufficiently rich, self-propagating systems will arise, and natural selection will lead to the evolution of self-propagating systems having increasingly complex, subtle, and sophisticated means of surviving and propagating themselves.
- Proposition 2: In the short term, natural selection favors self-propagating systems that pursue their own short-term advantage with little or no regard for long-term consequences.
- Proposition 3: Self-propagating subsystems of a given supersystem tend to become dependent on the supersystem and on the specific conditions that prevail within the supersystem.
- Proposition 4: Problems of transportation and communication impose a limit on the size of the geographical region over which a self-propagating system can extend its operations.
- Proposition 5: The most important and the only consistent limit on the size of the geographical regions over which self-propagating human groups extend their operations is the limit imposed by the available means of transportation and communication. In other words, while not all self-propagating human groups tend to extend their operations over a region of maximum size, natural selection tends to produce some self-propagating human groups that operate over regions approaching the maximum size allowed by the available means of transportation and communication.
- Proposition 6: In modern times, natural selection tends to produce some self-propagating human groups whose operations span the entire globe. Moreover, even if human beings are some day replaced by machines or other entities, natural selection will still tend to produce some self-propagating systems whose operations span the entire globe.
- Proposition 7: Where (as today) problems of transportation and communication do not constitute effective limitations on the size of the geographical regions over which self-propagating systems operate, natural selection tends to create a world in which power is mostly concentrated in the possession of a relatively small number of global self-propagating systems.

From these propositions, the author suggests that the logical conclusion of the development of the worldwide technological system is that planet Earth will become a dead planet by Holocene extinction.

The author also analyzes various historical cases according to his seven propositions.

=== Chapter 3: How to Transform a Society: Errors to Avoid ===
The third part of this book presents four postulates and five rules for every radical movement to consider if it wants to achieve success. From these postulates and rules, the author concludes that the anti-tech movement should aim to bring about the total collapse of the worldwide technological system by any means necessary.

- Postulate 1. One cannot change a society by pursuing goals that are vague or abstract. Instead, one has to have a clear and concrete goal. As an experienced activist put it: "Vague, over-generalized objectives are seldom met. The trick is to conceive of some specific development which will inevitably propel your community in the direction you want it to go."
- Postulate 2. Preaching alone—the mere advocacy of ideas—cannot bring about important, long-lasting changes in the behavior of human beings, unless in a very small minority.
- Postulate 3. Any radical movement tends to attract many people who may be sincere, but whose goals are only loosely related to the goals of the movement. The result is that the movement's original goals may become blurred, if not completely perverted.
- Postulate 4. Every radical movement that acquires great power becomes corrupt, at the latest, when its original leaders (meaning those who joined the movement while it was still relatively weak) are all dead or politically inactive. In saying that a movement becomes corrupt, we mean that its members, and especially its leaders, primarily seek personal advantages (such as money, security, social status, powerful offices, or a career) rather than dedicating themselves sincerely to the ideals of the movement.
- Rule (i) In order to change a society in a specified way, a movement should select a single, clear, simple, and concrete objective the achievement of which will produce the desired change.
- Rule (ii) If a movement aims to transform a society, then the objective selected by the movement must be of such a nature that, once the objective has been achieved, its consequences will be irreversible. This means that, once society has been transformed through the achievement of the objective, society will remain in its transformed condition without any further effort on the part of the movement or anyone else.
- Rule (iii) Once an objective has been selected, it is necessary to persuade some small minority to commit itself to the achievement of the objective by means more potent than mere preaching or advocacy of ideas. In other words, the minority will have to organize itself for practical action.
- Rule (iv) In order to keep itself faithful to its objective, a radical movement should devise means of excluding from its ranks all unsuitable persons who may seek to join it.
- Rule (v) Once a revolutionary movement has become powerful enough to achieve its objective, it must achieve its objective as soon as possible, and in any case before the original revolutionaries (meaning those who joined the movement while it was still relatively weak) die or become politically inactive.

In order to support these postulates and rules, this chapter analyzes various historical figures, revolutions, and radical movements, including the Russian Revolution, French Revolution, Chinese Communist Revolution, and Irish Nationalist Movement.

=== Chapter 4: Strategic Guidelines for an Anti-Tech Movement ===
The fourth chapter of this book presents 30 guidelines for anti-tech revolutionaries to follow. The author recommends anti-tech revolutionaries to study the works of Leon Trotsky, Saul Alinsky, Philip Selznick, and Neil Smelser.

== Reception ==
The French anti-tech movement known as "Anti-Tech Resistance" takes inspiration from Kaczynski, including from his book Anti-Tech Revolution, and later renaming themselves after the book.

== See also ==
- Anarcho-primitivism
- Criticism of technology
- Collapsology
- Green anarchism
- Industrial Society and Its Future
- Jacques Ellul
  - The Technological Society (1954/64)
- Man and Technics (1931)
- Neo-Luddism
- Pentti Linkola
- Philosophy of technology
- Propaganda: The Formation of Men's Attitudes
- The Question Concerning Technology (1954)
- Radical environmentalism
- Revolution
- Social Movement
- Technological Slavery, another book by Ted Kaczynski

Concepts

- Loose coupling
- Cascading failure
- Holocene extinction
- Accelerating change
