= Angelakos =

Angelakos is a surname. Notable people with the surname include:

- Diogenes Angelakos (1919–1997), American professor of electronic engineering
- Michael Angelakos (born 1987), American musician, singer, songwriter and record producer
