= Percy Wood =

American executive (1920–2008)

- Born: Percy Addison Wood Jr. June 7, 1920; Oakland, California, U.S.
- Died: June 23, 2008 (aged 88); Palm City, Florida, U.S.
- Occupations: President and Chief Operating Officer of United Airlines
- Known for: Injured by a bomb sent by Ted Kaczynski in 1980
- Spouse: Mary Sherwood (m. 1942; died 2007)
- Children: 4

Percy Addison Wood Jr. (June 7, 1920 – June 23, 2008) was a United Airlines executive who was notably injured by a bomb sent from Ted Kaczynski.

== Biography ==
Wood was born in Oakland, California, on June 7, 1920, and resided in San Mateo, California, Greenwich, Connecticut, and Lake Forest, Illinois, prior to retiring to Florida. He was past President and Chief Operating Officer of United Airlines, where he worked for 41 years. Wood joined United in 1941, and was named president of the airline in 1978, taking over the post from Richard J. Ferris, who was named chairman of the board. Ferris also was president of UAL Inc., parent company of the airline.

On June 10, 1980 Wood was injured in the fourth explosion attributed to the Unabomber, and suffered burns and cuts over much of his body when he opened a package left in the mailbox of his Lake Forest, Illinois, home. Inside the package was a copy of the book Ice Brothers, which had a bomb rigged inside.

In the last years of his life he lived in Sandhill Cove in Palm City, Florida, and was a 22-year resident of Mariner Sands, Stuart, Florida. He died on June 23, 2008. He was preceded in death by his wife of 65 years, Mary Sherwood, with whom he had four sons.
