= Scharlette Holdman =

American anti-death penalty activist (1946–2017)

- Born: December 11, 1946; Memphis, Tennessee, U.S.
- Died: July 12, 2017 (aged 70); New Orleans, Louisiana, U.S.
- Known for: Anti-death penalty activism

Scharlette Jane Holdman (December 11, 1946 – July 12, 2017) was an American death penalty abolitionist, anthropologist, and civil rights activist. She earned the nickname "The Angel of Death Row" due to her work collaborating with attorneys representing death row inmates during the appeals process and defendants facing capital murder charges, especially in Florida in the 1980s. She also earned the nickname "The Mistress of Delay" for the impact her advocacy had on delaying the execution of death row inmates' sentences. Holdman called herself a "death penalty mitigation specialist" and also coined the term "mitigation specialist" to refer to people to whom defense attorneys would refer to gather information on a capital defendant's past that would help prevent them from receiving the death penalty.

While Holdman was not an attorney herself, she counseled and guided capital defense attorneys, providing strategies for those attorneys to prevent their clients from receiving death sentences. Holdman's strategies involved mentoring attorneys on how to provide juries with holistic views of capital defendants' backgrounds. Holdman's work was considered highly influential to the American Bar Association's guidelines on defending capital defendants; Robert Dunham, former executive director of the Death Penalty Information Center, called Holdman's work the "model for life-history investigations" and stated that it set the "standard" that the American Bar Association continues to follow in death penalty cases. According to The New York Times, Holdman's efforts have been "widely credited" for the decline in the imposition of death sentences in the United States in the 2010s. One defense attorney who worked with Holdman stated, "Scharlette's influence is so broad that anybody who is doing mitigation is informed by her, even if they've never heard of her. All roads lead back to her."

Holdman was involved in numerous high-profile death penalty cases, including Unabomber Ted Kaczynski; surviving Boston Marathon bomber Dzhokhar Tsarnaev; Centennial Olympic Park bomber Eric Rudolph; Jared Lee Loughner, a mass murderer and attempted assassin of Gabby Giffords; and Khalid Sheikh Mohammed, a member of Al-Qaeda who helped orchestrate the September 11 attacks. In 1995, journalist and author David Von Drehle profiled Holdman and her work in his overview and critique of Florida's death penalty in the 1980s, Among the Lowest of the Dead: The Culture of Capital Punishment.

== Early life, personal life, and education ==
Holdman was born in Memphis, Tennessee, on December 11, 1946, to Neil Holdman and Maggie Mae Wardlow. Holdman and one of her sisters described their household as racist towards black people, although Holdman did not adopt the same prejudices; in an interview with the Miami Herald, she stated that her parents disapproved of her civil rights and anti-death penalty work and that she was estranged from them. Holdman grew up in Memphis and graduated from high school in 1964. Afterwards, she earned her Bachelor of Arts in anthropology at the University of Memphis, her Master of Arts in the same field at the University of Oregon, and her Doctor of Philosophy, again in anthropology, at the University of Hawaiʻi.

In the 1960s, Holdman became involved in the civil rights movement, working to help register black people to vote in the South following a century of disenfranchisement for black southerners. One of Holdman's first occupations was with a group opposing the United States' involvement in the Vietnam War. Throughout the 1970s, while she lived in Hawaii, she ran several American Civil Liberties Union chapters, primarily advocating for the rights of the physically handicapped, the decriminalization of sex work, prison abolition, abortion rights, and ratification of the Equal Rights Amendment. She also worked as an ACLU director in New Orleans and worked to close several jails, although she did not enjoy that work. She moved to Miami, Florida, in 1977, where she briefly worked as the ACLU executive director of Florida before resigning and relocating to Tallahassee, Florida.

Holdman was married once, to James Shotwell Lindzey, although they divorced in 1974. Holdman later stated that she found marriage stifling. They had two children.

== Anti-death penalty advocacy in Florida ==
Holdman focused on advocating against the death penalty after the Gregg v. Georgia decision by the U.S. Supreme Court in 1976 paved the way for use of the death penalty to resume in the United States. The Gregg decision required courts to consider "compassionate or mitigating factors stemming from the diverse frailties of humankind," so Holdman decided to recruit and mentor capital defense attorneys in presenting mitigating factors about capital defendants' backgrounds to juries and appellate courts, including information regarding inmates' family histories, mental capacity, motives, and medical history. Holdman used her anthropology background to aid in conducting multigenerational studies on defendants' and death row inmates' backgrounds and families. Robert Dunham, who was the executive director of the Death Penalty Information Center, explained the impact of Holdman's work by stating, "Juries want to kill monsters. They have a very hard time giving the go-ahead to kill somebody they see as a vulnerable human being."

Around 1978, Holdman started and headed the Tallahassee-based Florida Clearinghouse on Criminal Justice, an organization that recruited volunteer attorneys to work on capital defendants' cases and death row inmates' appeals. The Florida Clearinghouse had an annual budget under $25,000, and Holdman's salary was $600 a month; during her time at the clearinghouse, she lived a frugal lifestyle. Holdman typically recruited lawyers and sent them to Craig Barnard, the chief assistant public defender of West Palm Beach, Florida, for training and education on how to craft an effective appeal. Holdman's clearinghouse focused foremost on death row inmates who were at imminent risk of execution. Prior to the existence of the clearinghouse, death row inmates in Florida were guaranteed the right to a public defender only while filing their first appeal to the Supreme Court of Florida, after which the inmate, who was often indigent and not educated in the law, was no longer guaranteed legal representation to deal with the rest of their possible appeals. On June 19, 1986, Holdman won the American Judicature Society's Special Merit Citation for her work with Florida's death row inmates.

The Florida Clearinghouse on Criminal Justice struggled to find an adequate number of attorneys to represent every capital defendant and death row inmate in need of legal representation, and it also struggled with limited funds. As a result, in 1985, the Office of Capital Collateral Representative (CCR), a centralized government-funded organization, was founded by The Florida Bar. CCR, which, in its first year, received five times more funding than the clearinghouse had, ultimately replaced Holdman's clearinghouse in providing attorneys to capital defendants and death row inmates, although Holdman also worked with CCR as their chief investigator.

== After Florida ==
Following her work with the CCR, Holdman relocated to San Francisco, California, where she continued working in anti-death penalty advocacy at one of the California appellate projects. Her later work focused less on helping death row inmates through the appellate process, and more on helping with pretrial investigations.

Holdman's final client was Khalid Sheikh Mohammed, one of the main participants in the September 11 terror attacks on the United States. Around that time, Holdman studied Islam and ultimately converted "in solidarity with people who have been unjustly scrutinized and persecuted by the government."

After helping to prevent Ted Kaczynski from being sentenced to death and helping him to obtain a sentence of life imprisonment without parole, Kaczynski gifted her his infamous shack in Montana, where he had planned many of his crimes. The U.S. government refused to allow Holdman to keep the shack.

Holdman later moved to New Orleans, Louisiana, where she worked at the Center for Capital Assistance in training lawyers and investigators to conduct pretrial investigations on inmates' backgrounds and develop evidence to secure life sentences for capital murder defendants.

== Later life and death ==
Holdman spent her final years in New Orleans. She died of gallbladder cancer in her New Orleans home on July 12, 2017, at the age of 70. Because of her work aiding Mohammed, and because of her conversion to Islam, she received a Muslim burial.

== See also ==
- Marie Deans, another non-lawyer death penalty abolitionist, active mostly in Virginia and South Carolina in the 1980s
