= Technological Slavery =

Book by American terrorist Ted Kaczynski

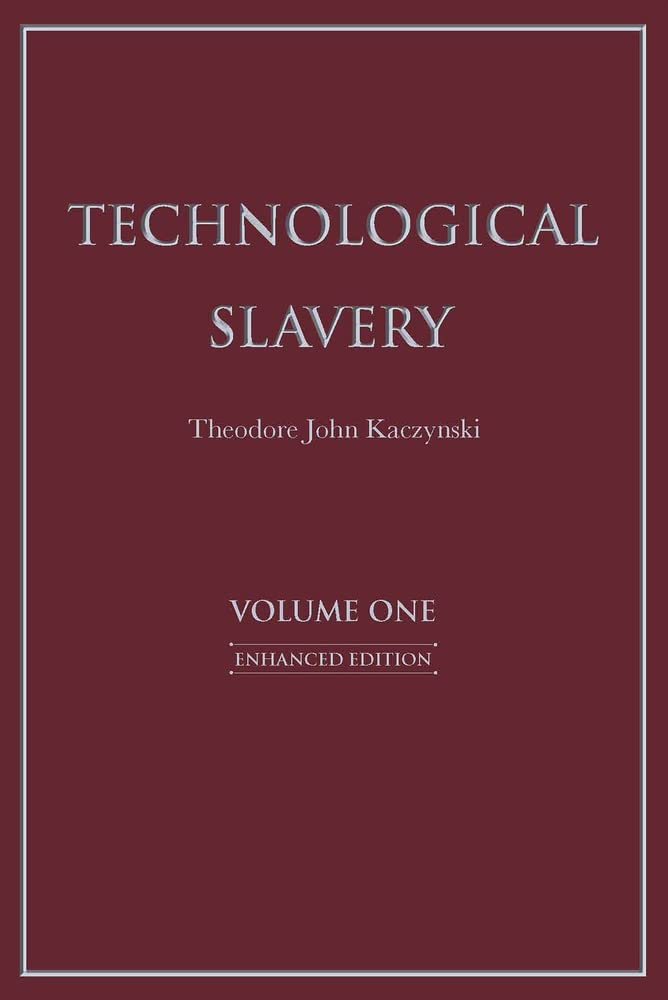
- Author: Theodore John Kaczynski
- Language: English
- Genre: History, social science
- Publisher: Fitch & Madison Publishers
- Publication date: October 20, 2008
- Publication place: United States
- Media type: Print
- Pages: 371
- ISBN: 978-1-944228033
- LC Class: 2021945621
- Preceded by: Industrial Society and Its Future

Technological Slavery (published in its first edition as The Road to Revolution) is a 2008 non-fiction book by the American Theodore Kaczynski, also known as the Unabomber, that expands on his personal philosophy and beliefs regarding technology and freedom.

== Summary ==
In it, Kaczynski continues the critique of modern technological society that he began with his 1995 manifesto, Industrial Society and Its Future. The book serves as a compendium of his thoughts and philosophies on technology, freedom, and the impacts of societal progression on individual autonomy.

The book includes Kaczynski's correspondence with various intellectuals, his responses to criticism, and further elaboration on the themes of technological dominance and its opposition. It has been a subject of considerable debate and analysis within academic and technological ethics circles.

== Publication history ==
The first edition was published in 2008 by the French publishing company Editions Xenia under the title The Road to Revolution. The second edition was published with the new title Technological Slavery: The Collected Writings of Theodore J. Kaczynski, a.k.a. "The Unabomber" in 2010 by the American publishing company Feral House; the contents of this edition remained the same as the 2008 edition. The third edition was published as Technological Slavery, Volume One, in 2019 by the American publishing company Fitch & Madison Publishers. The fourth edition, again published as Technological Slavery, Volume One, was published by Fitch & Madison Publishers in 2022.

Kaczynski decided to split the book into two volumes on account of the new size of the book; the third and fourth editions of Technological Slavery were expanded to include a substantial amount of new material. No second volume was ever published with the third edition, though the second and final volume is expected to be published for the fourth edition. Certain texts which appeared in the first and second editions do not appear in the first volume of the third and fourth editions, either because Kaczynski decided to no longer publish them, or because they were allocated for inclusion in the second volume. These include, but are not limited to, the essays "The Truth About Primitive Life" and "Morality and Revolution".

== Synopsis ==
The book presents a sharp critique of technological advancement, with Kaczynski contending that technology is the core cause of contemporary environmental and social issues. He posits that the collapse of modern tech-dependent society is necessary to save human freedom, dignity, and nature, advocating for a revolutionary movement to hasten this collapse. It includes his manifesto, Industrial Society and Its Future, which is updated with additional notes in later editions. Kaczynski's letters and essays throughout the book elaborate on his manifesto points, including detailed responses to critiques from Dr. David Skrbina and others. Dr. Skrbina, who penned the afterwords for the first two editions, is a prominent correspondent in these discussions.

=== Letter to Scientific American ===
This letter was written in 1995 before Kaczynski was apprehended and while he was still communicating via letters to the media with the moniker "FC" (for "Freedom Club"). The letter was never published by the journal, though Kaczynski includes it as the introductory piece of the book, presumably because it establishes some of the main tenets of his arguments and is highly controversial and provocative.

Kaczynski addresses the problem of scientists "routinely tak[ing] risks affecting the public", pointing out that the very nature of scientific advancement entails risks to the public that they are often not aware of and have no appreciable means of affecting. Scientists and engineers "constantly gamble with human welfare", Kaczynski argues, and states, "we see today the effects of some of their lost gambles", proceeding to list a number of serious negative consequences that have their origins in scientific advances such as accumulating nuclear waste, crowding and pollution, etc.

Kaczynski highlights that the negative physical and social consequences of scientific advance are inherently unpredictable and therefore uncontrollable. He states: "Every major technical advance is also a social experiment. These experiments are performed on the public by the scientists and the corporations and government agencies that pay for their research." It is clear from the letter that Kaczynski does not view this as a malevolent or conspiratorial form of experimentation by intent, but nevertheless still constitutes experimentation in fact.

Kaczynski concludes by stating there are good reasons to believe that, notwithstanding the future implications of continued scientific advance, the current social consequences of technological progress are "on balance highly negative". The harm that science could cause society was not known to the early scientists at the dawn of the industrial revolution and thus they "can be forgiven", Kaczynski states, but that the harm caused by continuing scientific advance is now so apparent that to continue promoting it is "grossly irresponsible".

=== "Industrial Society and Its Future" ===
The original manifesto, "Industrial Society and Its Future", had 36 endnotes to substantiate various points made in the paragraphs of the body text. The updated version of the manifesto included in the third and fourth editions contains 27 entirely new endnotes for a grand total of 63 endnotes, as well as a section at the end titled "Further comments (Added 2020)". The new notes are clearly marked as "(Added 2016)" or "(Modified 2016)" for preexisting notes that have been modified. The new notes or modified notes generally contain new information made available to Kaczynski since the manifesto was originally published, including new source citations.

=== Postscript to "Industrial Society and Its Future" ===
The postscript to the manifesto is dated 2007. In it, Kaczynski addresses in brief the criticisms the manifesto received after its publication, as well as its significance. Kaczynski answers the claim that the manifesto is "unoriginal" by stating it was never intended to be original. Its purpose was "to set forth certain points about modern technology in clear and relatively brief form". Kaczynski then claims that the claim of originality or unoriginality is irrelevant to the problem of modern technology, which is of paramount importance. Kaczynski claims that many intellectuals would not deny that there is a technology problem, but that they universally refuse to discuss it. The technology problem is "simply ignored". As with the manifesto, Kaczynski states that no claims of originality are made for the book itself; though Kaczynski suggests that his originality stems from his approach to revolution as a practical possibility to solve the problem of modern technology. Some serious thinkers have suggested revolution as an approach to take, such as Jacques Ellul in his book Autopsy of a Revolution, but the kind of revolution envisioned by Ellul is "vague" and "spiritual" according to Kaczynski, whereas Kaczynski claims that a "real revolution" (such as revolutions that have occurred in the past like the French and Russian revolutions) is a distinct possibility to be actively worked towards. But suitable leaders are needed for this revolution that are rationally guided and not "enraged adolescents acting solely on the basis of emotion".

=== "The System's Neatest Trick" ===
This essay, written in 2002, explores the idea that the industrial technological "system" subverts the impulse to rebel to its own advantage. Would-be revolutionaries are brainwashed by the system to "rebel" in favor of the very values of the industrial system itself (values the industrial system needs to further its advancement and continued erosion of freedom and dignity) against outmoded values and values threatening or inconvenient to the system. The main points are summarized within the text itself:

So, in a nutshell, the System’s neatest trick is this:

1. For the sake of its own efficiency and security, the System needs to bring about deep and radical social changes to match the changed conditions resulting from technological progress.
2. The frustration of life under the circumstances imposed by the System leads to rebellious impulses.
3. Rebellious impulses are co-opted by the System in the service of the social changes it requires; activists "rebel" against the old and outmoded values that are no longer of use to the System and in favor of the new values that the System needs us to accept.
4. In this way rebellious impulses, which otherwise might have been dangerous to the System, are given an outlet that is not only harmless to the System, but useful to it.
5. Much of the public resentment resulting from the imposition of social changes is drawn away from the System and its institutions and is directed instead at the radicals who spearhead the social changes.

Kaczynski does not think this "trick" is rationally planned or intentionally implemented by malevolent human actors, but rather it has arisen organically from the self-interest of individuals and organizations in the context of a modern technological environment. He also claims that the trick is not perfect and occasionally backfires, as when there is a conflict between "integration propaganda" (principally propaganda promoting nonviolence) and "agitation propaganda" (propaganda needed by the system occasionally in times of war). For example, many activists who have been rebelling in favor of "nonviolence" continue to do so in times of war when this rebellion is in fact contrary to the system's interests. But on the whole, Kaczynski claims the fact that the "trick" backfires occasionally does not prevent it from being an effective means of subverting rebellious impulses by redirecting them in the service of modest reforms before they can take on a truly revolutionary direction.

=== Letters to David Skrbina ===
Nine letters to David Skrbina are included in the text, from a letter dated January 2, 2004, through to a letter dated July 10, 2005. Kaczynski notes at the opening of the section that in some sense his ideas have evolved since this correspondence, and if there are any conflicts between what he writes here and what he subsequently wrote in his second book, Anti-Tech Revolution, the latter represents his current view.

The main theme that surfaces through these letters is Kaczynski's hard technological determinism. According to Kaczynski, societies do not evolve, in the grand scheme, due to human agency, but result from the influence of "objective" factors, or material conditions. Therefore, attempts to guide the evolution of society, particularly modern technological society, without changing the objective factors is fundamentally futile. Furthermore, no society can be rationally predicted, managed or planned. It follows from Kaczynski's particular arguments on technological determinism that the only route available to stopping technological progress is to change the objective factors. Since Kaczynski views the principle objective factor as modern technology, and because modern technology cannot be rationally controlled, Kaczynski argues that the only option for human agency to revert humanity back to a period of low technology (which he views as desirable and necessary for human flourishing and biosphere survival) is to destroy or force the collapse of modern technology (i.e., the worldwide "techno-industrial system").

== Impact ==
While the initial publication by Editions Xenia met with little media attention, the book’s subsequent release as the second edition in 2010 by the publishing company Feral House generated moderate media attention. Kaczynski used the opportunity to mention the book in an update on his page of the Harvard alumni book, presumably to aid in publicity. The book has been discussed by scholars.

The French anti-tech movement known as "Anti-Tech Resistance" takes inspiration from Kaczynski, including from his book Technological Slavery.

== Sources ==
- Kaczynski, Theodore John (2022), Technological Slavery, Volume One, Scottsdale, Arizona: Fitch & Madison Publishers, LLC, ISBN 978-1-944228-03-3
- Kaczynski, Theodore J. (2010), Technological Slavery: The Collected Writings of Theodore J. Kaczynski, Port Townsend, Washington: Feral House, 978-1932595-80-2
- Kaczynski, Theodore J. (2008), Technological Slavery: The Complete And Authorized Unabomber, Sion, Switzerland: Editions Xenia, 978-2888920656
