= Ted Kaczynski =

American domestic terrorist (1942–2023)

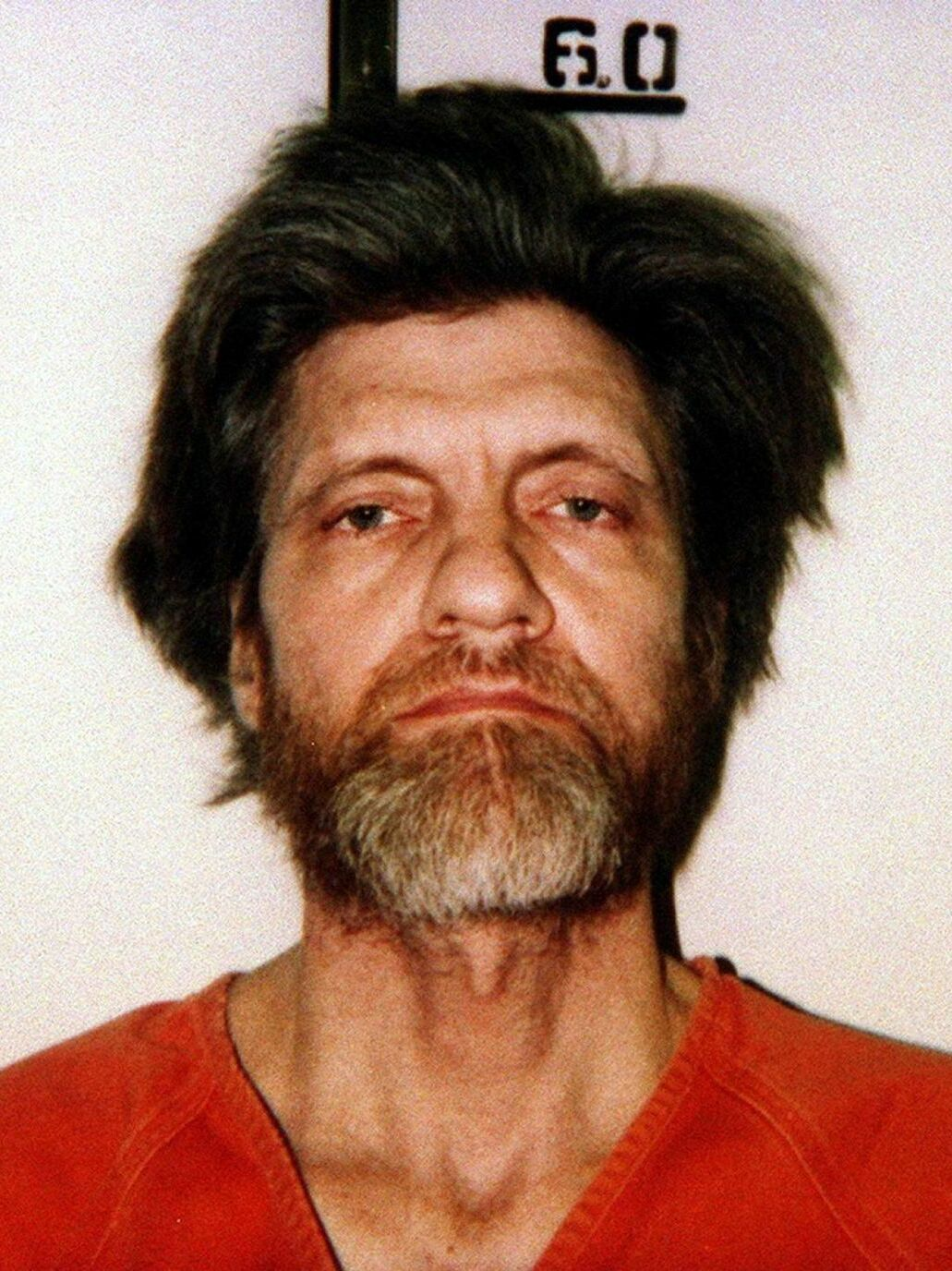
- Kaczynski after his arrest in 1996
- Born: Theodore John Kaczynski; May 22, 1942; Chicago, Illinois, U.S.
- Died: June 10, 2023 (aged 81); Durham, North Carolina, U.S.
- Other names: Unabomber; FC; Uncle Ted
- Education: Harvard University (BA); University of Michigan (MA, PhD)
- Occupation: Mathematics professor
- Notable work: Industrial Society and Its Future (1995)
- Relatives: David Kaczynski (brother)
- Convictions: Transportation, mailing, and use of bombs (10 counts); First-degree murder (3 counts)
- Penalty: Several consecutive life sentences without the possibility of parole (Note: Kaczynski received four life sentences, plus thirty years imprisonment. However, others (as well as Kaczynski himself) claim he received eight life sentences.)

Details
- Span of crimes: 1978–1995
- Killed: 3
- Injured: 23
- Date apprehended: April 3, 1996
- Scientific career
- Fields: Complex analysis
- Workplaces: University of Michigan; University of California, Berkeley
- Thesis: Boundary Functions (1967)
- Doctoral advisor: Allen Shields
- Other academic advisors: George Piranian

Theodore John Kaczynski (/kəˈzɪnski/ kə-ZIN-skee; May 22, 1942 – June 10, 2023), also known as the Unabomber (/ˈjuːnəbɒmər/ YOU-na-bom-ər), was an American mathematician and domestic terrorist. A mathematics prodigy, he abandoned his academic career to pursue a reclusive primitive lifestyle and lone wolf terrorism campaign.

Kaczynski murdered three people and injured 23 others between 1978 and 1995 in a nationwide mail bombing campaign against those he believed to be advancing modern technology and the destruction of the natural environment. He authored a roughly 35,000-word manifesto and social critique, Industrial Society and Its Future (1995), which opposes all forms of technology, rejects leftism, advocates cultural primitivism, and ultimately suggests violent revolution.

In 1971, Kaczynski moved to a remote cabin without electricity or running water near Lincoln, Montana, where he lived as a recluse while learning survival skills to become self-sufficient. After witnessing the destruction of the wilderness surrounding his cabin, he concluded that living in nature was becoming impossible and resolved to fight industrialization and its destruction of nature through terrorism. In 1979, Kaczynski became the subject of what was, by the time of his arrest in 1996, the longest and most expensive investigation in the history of the Federal Bureau of Investigation (FBI). The FBI used the case identifier UNABOM (University and Airline Bombing) before his identity was known, resulting in the media naming him the "Unabomber".

In 1995, Kaczynski sent a letter to The New York Times promising to "desist from terrorism" if the Times or The Washington Post published his manifesto, in which he argued that his bombings were extreme but necessary in attracting attention to the erosion of human freedom and dignity by modern technologies. The FBI and U.S. attorney general Janet Reno pushed for the publication of the essay, which appeared in The Washington Post in September 1995. Upon reading it, Kaczynski's brother, David, recognized the prose style and reported his suspicions to the FBI.

After his arrest in 1996, Kaczynski—maintaining that he was sane—tried and failed to dismiss his court-appointed lawyers because they wished him to plead insanity to avoid the death penalty. He pleaded guilty to all charges in 1998 and was sentenced to several consecutive life terms in prison without the possibility of parole. In 2021, he received a cancer diagnosis and stopped treatment in March 2023. Kaczynski hanged himself in prison in June 2023.

== Early life ==
=== Childhood ===
Theodore John Kaczynski was born in Chicago on May 22, 1942, to working-class parents Wanda Theresa (née Dombek) and Theodore Richard Kaczynski, a sausage maker. The two were Polish Americans who were raised as Roman Catholics but later became atheists. They married on April 11, 1939.

From first to fourth grade (ages six to nine), Kaczynski attended Sherman Elementary School in Chicago, where administrators described him as healthy and well-adjusted. In 1952, three years after his brother David was born, the family moved to suburban Evergreen Park, Illinois, and Ted transferred to Evergreen Park Central Junior High School. After testing scored his IQ at 167, he skipped the sixth grade. Kaczynski later described this as a pivotal event: previously he had socialized with his peers and was even seen as a leader, but after skipping ahead of them he felt he did not fit in with the older children, who bullied him.

Neighbors in Evergreen Park later described the Kaczynski family as "civic-minded folks", one recalling the parents "sacrificed everything they had for their children". Both Ted and David were intelligent, but Ted was exceptionally bright. Neighbors described him as a smart but lonely individual.

=== High school ===
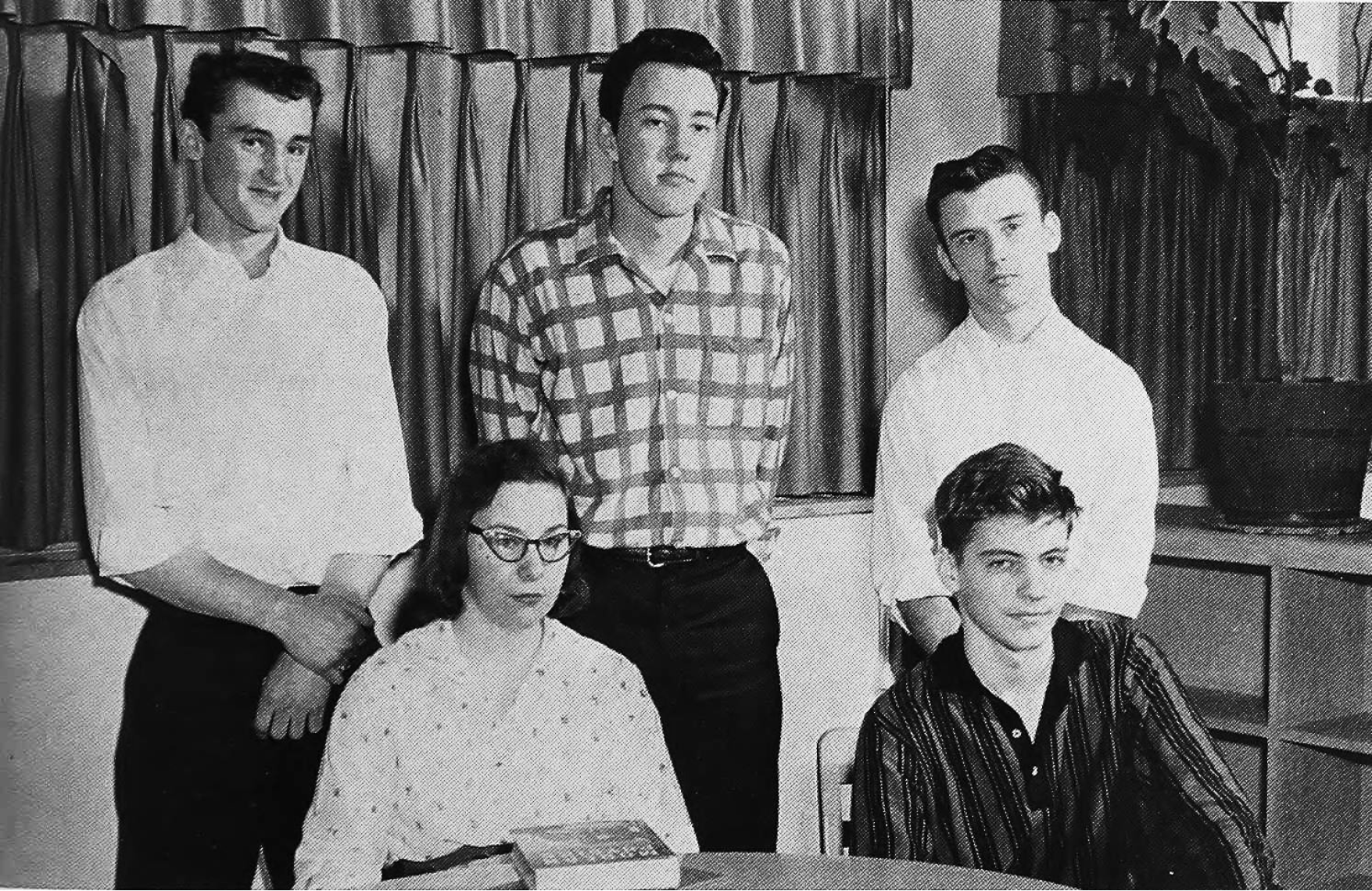
Kaczynski (bottom right) with other merit scholarship finalists from his high school

Kaczynski attended Evergreen Park Community High School, where he excelled academically. He played the trombone in the marching band and was a member of the mathematics, biology, coin, and German clubs. In 1996, a former classmate said: "He was never really seen as a person, as an individual personality ... He was always regarded as a walking brain, so to speak." During this period, Kaczynski became intensely interested in mathematics, spending hours studying and solving advanced problems. He became associated with a group of like-minded boys interested in science and mathematics, known as the "briefcase boys" due to their penchant for carrying briefcases.

Throughout high school, Kaczynski was ahead of his classmates academically. Placed in a more advanced mathematics class, he soon mastered the material. He skipped the eleventh grade, and, by attending summer school, he graduated at age 15. Kaczynski was one of his school's five National Merit finalists and was encouraged to apply to Harvard University. While still age 15, he was accepted to Harvard and entered the university on a scholarship in 1958 at age 16. A high school classmate later said Kaczynski was emotionally unprepared: "They packed him up and sent him to Harvard before he was ready ... He didn't even have a driver's license."

== Education and teaching career ==
=== Harvard University ===
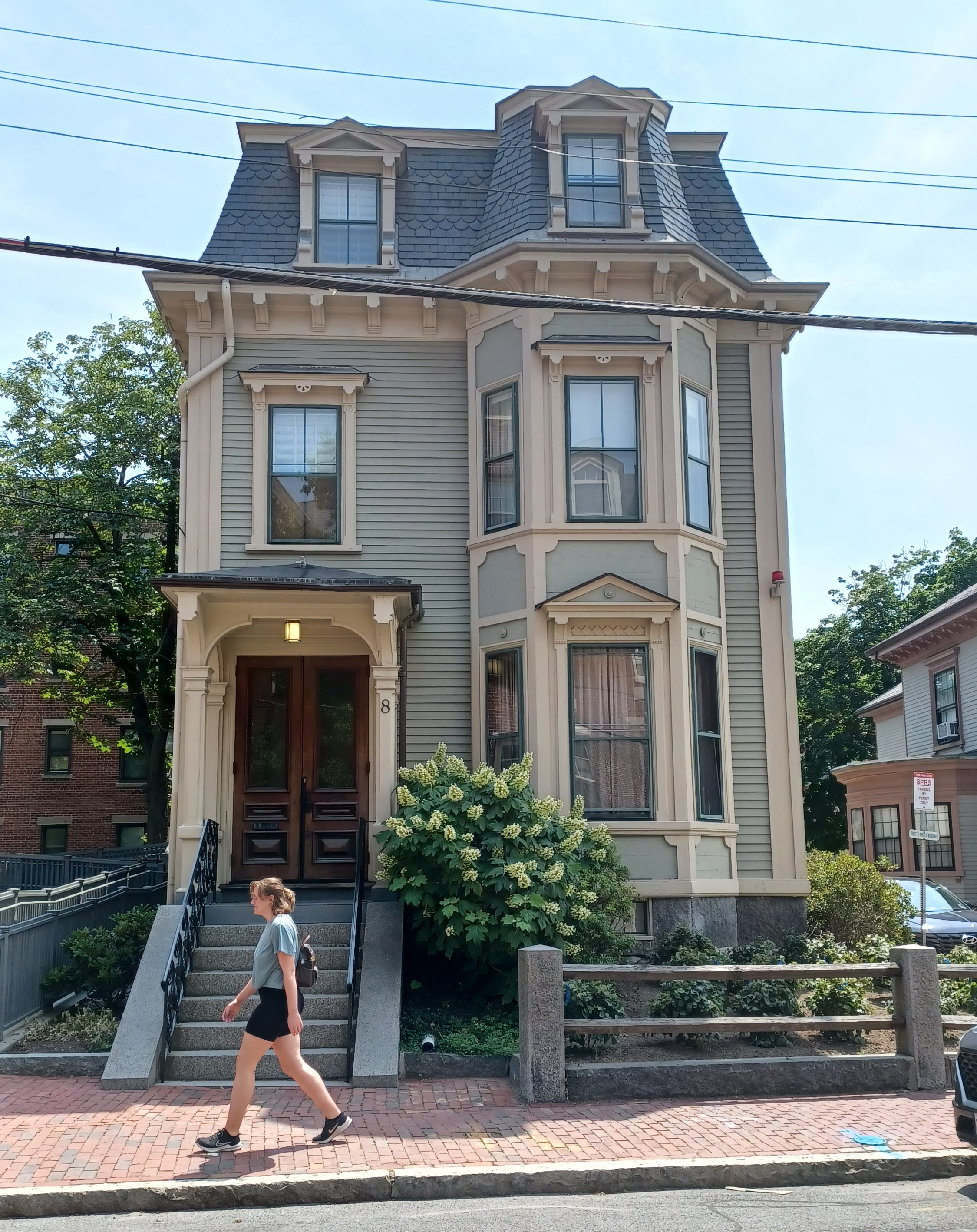
8 Prescott St, Kaczynski's home during his first year at Harvard

Kaczynski matriculated at Harvard College as a mathematics prodigy. During his first year at the university, Kaczynski lived at 8 Prescott Street, which was intended to provide a small, intimate living space for the youngest, most precocious incoming students. For the following three years, he lived at Eliot House. His housemates and other students at Harvard described Kaczynski as a very intelligent but socially reserved person. He earned his Bachelor of Arts degree in mathematics from Harvard in 1962, finishing with a GPA of 3.12.

In his second year at Harvard, Kaczynski participated in a study led by Harvard psychologist Henry Murray. Subjects were told they would debate personal philosophy with a fellow student and were asked to write essays detailing their personal beliefs and aspirations. The essays were given to an anonymous individual who would confront and belittle the subject in what Murray himself called "vehement, sweeping, and personally abusive" attacks, using the content of the essays as ammunition. Kaczynski spent 200 hours as part of the study.

Kaczynski's lawyers later attributed his hostility towards mind control techniques to his participation in Murray's study. Kaczynski stated he resented Murray and his co-workers, primarily because of the invasion of his privacy he perceived as a result of their experiments. Nevertheless, he said he was "quite confident that [his] experiences with Professor Murray had no significant effect on the course of [his] life".

=== University of Michigan ===
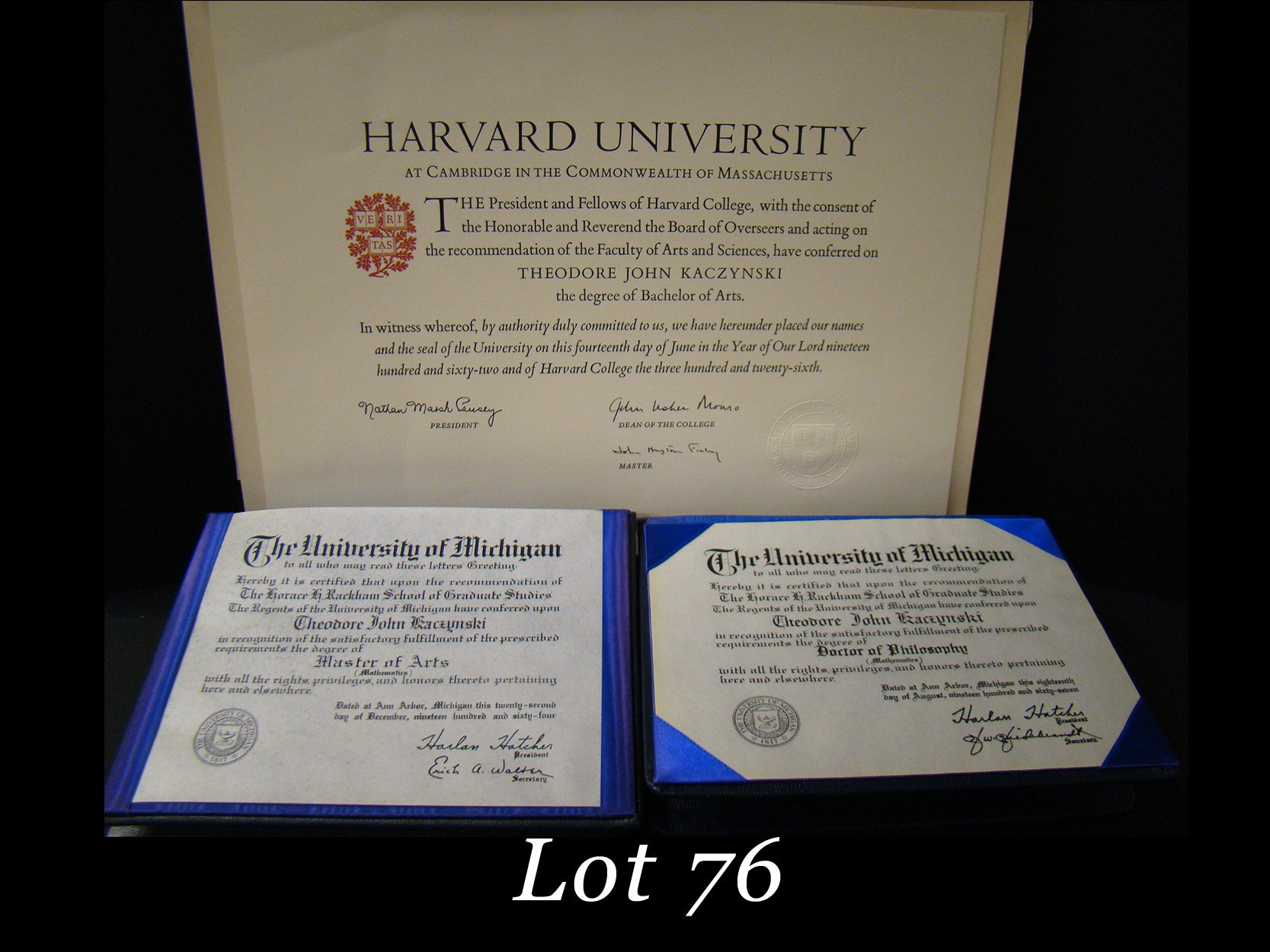
Kaczynski's diplomas from Harvard University and the University of Michigan

In 1962, Kaczynski enrolled at the University of Michigan, where he earned his Master of Arts and Ph.D. in mathematics in 1964 and 1967, respectively. Michigan was not his first choice for postgraduate education; he had applied to the University of California, Berkeley, and the University of Chicago, both of which accepted him but offered him no teaching position or financial aid. Michigan offered him an annual grant of $2,310 (equivalent to $25,000 in 2025) and a teaching post.

At Michigan, Kaczynski specialized in complex analysis, specifically geometric function theory. Professor Peter Duren said of Kaczynski, "He was an unusual person. He was not like the other graduate students. He was much more focused about his work. He had a drive to discover mathematical truth." George Piranian, another of his Michigan mathematics professors, said, "It is not enough to say he was smart." Piranian taught Kaczynski function theory and recalled, "he was very persistent in his work. If a problem was hard, he worked harder. He was easily the top student, or one of the top". Professor Allen Shields wrote about Kaczynski in a grade evaluation that he was the "best man I have seen". Kaczynski received one F, five B's and twelve A's in his eighteen courses at the university. In 2006, he said he had unpleasant memories of Michigan and felt the university had low standards for grading, considering his relatively high grades.

For a period of several weeks in 1966, Kaczynski experienced intense sexual fantasies of being female and decided to undergo gender transition. He arranged to meet with a psychiatrist but changed his mind in the waiting room and discussed other things instead, without disclosing his original reason for making the appointment. Afterward, enraged, he considered killing the psychiatrist and other people whom he hated. Kaczynski described this episode as a "major turning point" in his life. He recalled: "I felt disgusted about what my uncontrolled sexual cravings had almost led me to do. And I felt humiliated, and I violently hated the psychiatrist. Just then there came a major turning point in my life. Like a phoenix, I burst from the ashes of my despair to a glorious new hope."

In 1967, Kaczynski's dissertation, Boundary Functions, won the Sumner B. Myers Prize for Michigan's best mathematics dissertation of the year. Shields, then his doctoral advisor, called it "the best I have ever directed", and Maxwell Reade, a member of his dissertation committee, said, "I would guess that maybe 10 or 12 men in the country understood or appreciated it."

=== Assistant professorship ===
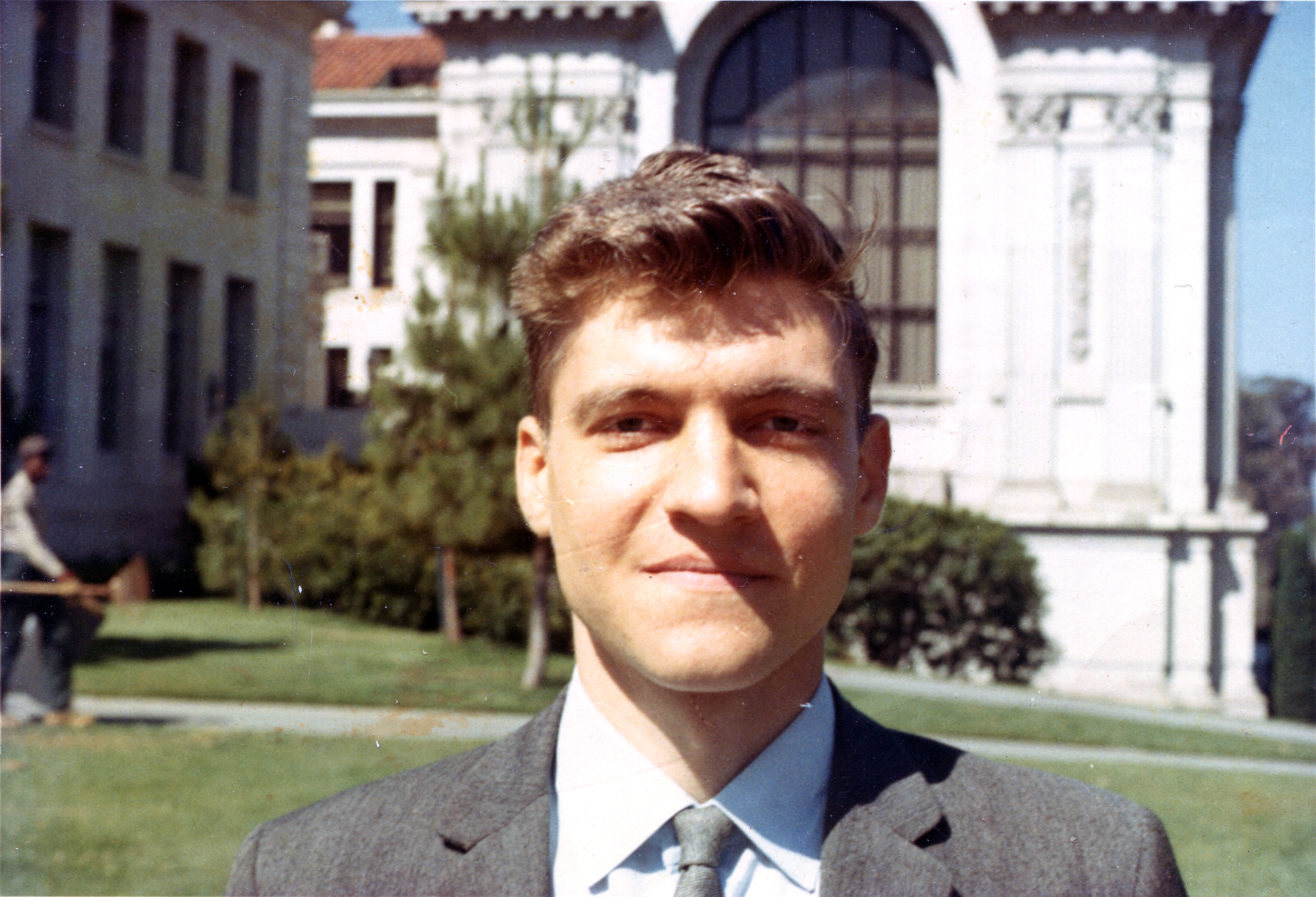
Kaczynski as an assistant professor at UC Berkeley in 1968

In late 1967, the 25-year-old Kaczynski became an acting assistant professor at the University of California, Berkeley, where he taught mathematics. He was the youngest assistant professor in the history of the university. By September 1968, Kaczynski was formally appointed to an assistant professorship, a sign that he was on track for tenure. His teaching evaluations suggested he was not well-liked by his students—he seemed uncomfortable teaching, taught straight from the textbook, and refused to answer questions.

Without any explanation, Kaczynski resigned on June 30, 1969. In a 1970 letter written by John W. Addison Jr., the chairman of the mathematics department, to Kaczynski's doctoral advisor Shields, Addison referred to the resignation as "quite out of the blue". He added that "Kaczynski seemed almost pathologically shy", and that, as far as he knew, Kaczynski made no close friends in the department, noting that efforts to bring him more into the "swing of things" had failed.

In 1996, reporters for the Los Angeles Times interviewed mathematicians about Kaczynski's work and concluded that Kaczynski's subfield effectively ceased to exist after the 1960s, as most of its conjectures had been proven. According to mathematician Donald Rung, if Kaczynski had continued to work in mathematics, he "probably would have gone on to some other area".

== Life in Montana ==
Interior of Kaczynski's cabin after his arrest

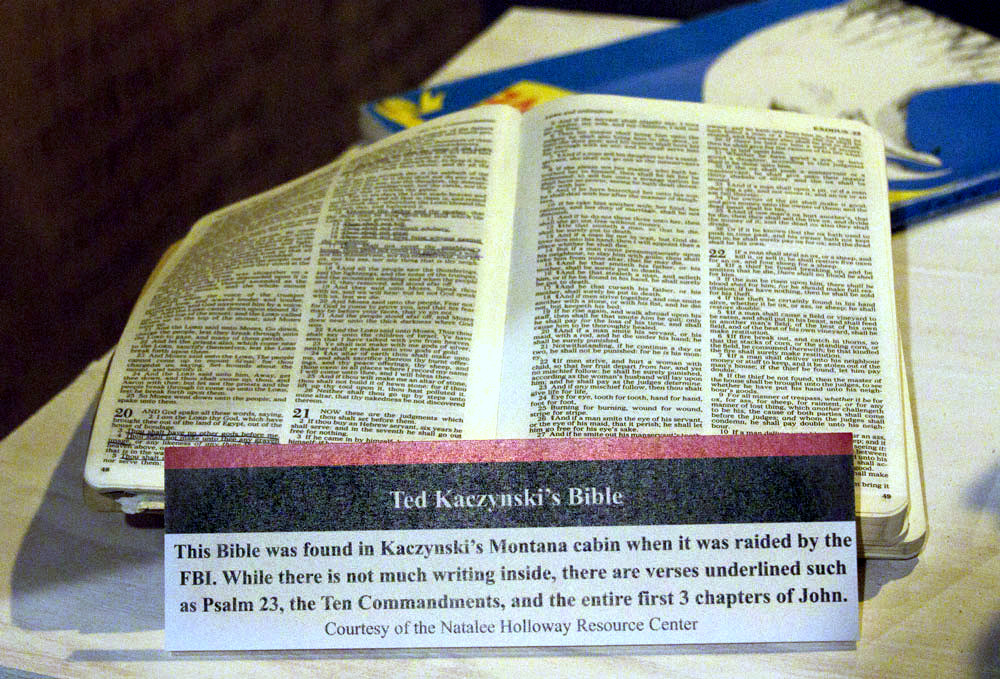
Bible belonging to Kaczynski, found in his cabin

After resigning from Berkeley, Kaczynski moved to his parents' home in Lombard, Illinois. Two years later, in 1971, he moved to a remote cabin he had built outside Lincoln, Montana, where he could live a simple life with little money and without electricity or running water, working odd jobs and receiving significant financial support from his family.

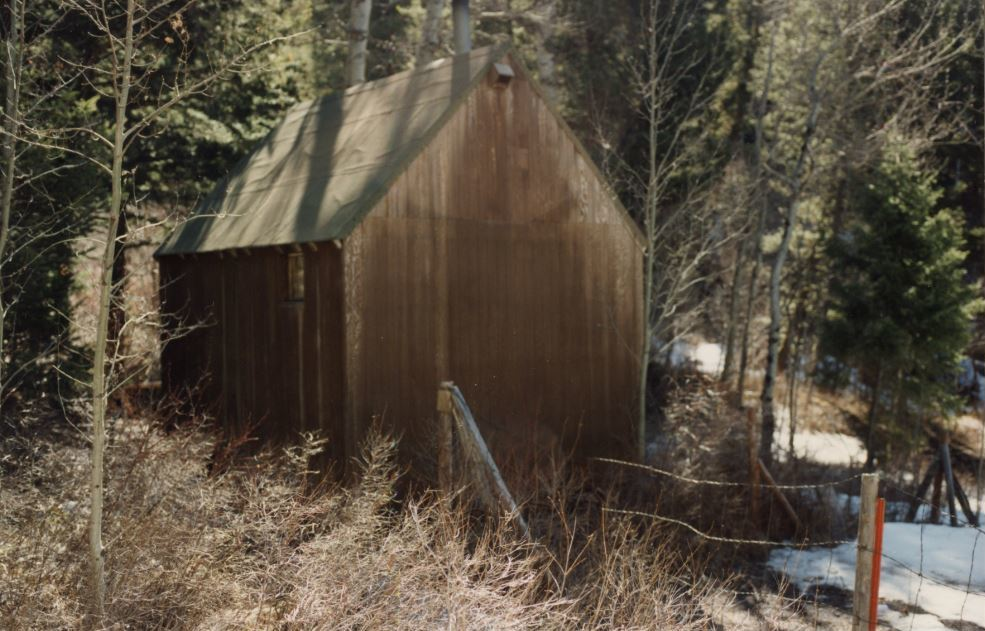
Kaczynski's cabin, photographed in 1996

Kaczynski's original goal was to become self-sufficient so he could live autonomously. He used an old bicycle to get to town, and a volunteer at the local library said he visited frequently to read classic works in their original languages. Other Lincoln residents said later that such a lifestyle was typical in the area. Kaczynski's cabin was described by a census taker in the 1990 census as containing a bed, two chairs, storage trunks, a gas stove, and lots of books.

Starting in 1975, Kaczynski performed acts of sabotage including arson and booby trapping against developments near his cabin. He also dedicated himself to reading about sociology and political philosophy, including the works of Jacques Ellul. Kaczynski's brother David later stated that Ellul's book The Technological Society "became Ted's Bible". Kaczynski recounted in 1998, "When I read the book for the first time, I was delighted, because I thought, 'Here is someone who is saying what I have already been thinking.'"

In an interview after his arrest, Kaczynski recalled being shocked on a hike to one of his favorite wild spots:

It's kind of rolling country, not flat, and when you get to the edge of it you find these ravines that cut very steeply in to cliff-like drop-offs and there was even a waterfall there. It was about a two days' hike from my cabin. That was the best spot until the summer of 1983. That summer there were too many people around my cabin so I decided I needed some peace. I went back to the plateau and when I got there I found they had put a road right through the middle of it ... You just can't imagine how upset I was. It was from that point on I decided that, rather than trying to acquire further wilderness skills, I would work on getting back at the system. Revenge.

During the 1980s and 1990s, Kaczynski's neighbors suspected him of attacking and poisoning their dogs on multiple occasions. After his arrest, the FBI found poisons in his cabin, and in later letters, he admitted to killing at least one dog.

Kaczynski was visited multiple times in Montana by his father, who was impressed by Ted's wilderness skills. Kaczynski's father was diagnosed with terminal lung cancer in 1990 and held a family meeting without Kaczynski later that year to map out their future. On October 2, 1990, Kaczynski's father shot and killed himself in his home.

== Bombings ==
Between 1978 and 1995, Kaczynski mailed or hand-delivered a series of increasingly sophisticated bombs that cumulatively killed three people and injured 23 others. Sixteen bombs were attributed to Kaczynski. While the bombing devices varied widely through the years, many contained the initials "FC", which Kaczynski later said stood for "Freedom Club", inscribed on parts inside. He purposely left misleading clues in the devices and took extreme care in preparing them to avoid leaving fingerprints; fingerprints found on some of the devices did not match those found on letters attributed to Kaczynski. (Note: As stated in the "Additional Findings" section of the FBI affidavit, where a balanced listing of other uncorrelated evidence and contrary determinations also appeared, "203. Latent fingerprints attributable to devices mailed and/or placed by the UNABOM subject were compared to those found on the letters attributed to Theodore Kaczynski. According to the FBI Laboratory no forensic correlation exists between those samples.")

Bombings carried out by Kaczynski
Date	State	Location	Detonation	Victim(s)	Occupation of victim(s)	Injuries
May 25, 1978	Illinois	Northwestern University	Yes	Terry Marker	University police officer	Minor cuts and burns
May 9, 1979	Illinois	Northwestern University	Yes	John Harris	Graduate student	Minor cuts and burns
November 15, 1979	Illinois	American Airlines Flight 444 from Chicago to Washington, D.C. (explosion occurred midflight)	Yes	Twelve passengers	Multiple	Non-lethal smoke inhalation
June 10, 1980	Illinois	Lake Forest	Yes	Percy Wood	President of United Airlines	Severe cuts and burns over most of body and face
October 8, 1981	Utah	University of Utah	Bomb defused	—N/a	—N/a	—N/a
May 5, 1982	Tennessee	Vanderbilt University	Yes	Janet Smith	University secretary	Severe burns to hands; shrapnel wounds to body
July 2, 1982	California	University of California, Berkeley	Yes	Diogenes Angelakos	Engineering professor	Severe burns and shrapnel wounds to hand and face
May 15, 1985	California	University of California, Berkeley	Yes	John Hauser	Graduate student	Loss of four fingers and severed artery in right arm; partial loss of vision in left eye
June 13, 1985	Washington	The Boeing Company in Auburn	Bomb defused	—N/a	—N/a	—N/a
November 15, 1985	Michigan	University of Michigan	Yes	James V. McConnell	Psychology professor	Temporary hearing loss
November 15, 1985	Michigan	University of Michigan	Yes	Nicklaus Suino	Research assistant	Burns and shrapnel wounds
December 11, 1985	California	Sacramento	Yes	Hugh Scrutton	Computer store owner	Death
February 20, 1987	Utah	Salt Lake City	Yes	Gary Wright	Computer store owner	Severe nerve damage to left arm
June 22, 1993	California	Tiburon	Yes	Charles Epstein	Geneticist	Severe damage to both eardrums with partial hearing loss, loss of three fingers
June 24, 1993	Connecticut	Yale University	Yes	David Gelernter	Computer science professor	Severe burns and shrapnel wounds, damage to right eye, loss of use of right hand
December 10, 1994	New Jersey	North Caldwell	Yes	Thomas J. Mosser	Advertising executive at Burson-Marsteller	Death
April 24, 1995	California	Sacramento	Yes	Gilbert Brent Murray	President of the California Forestry Association	Death

=== Initial bombings ===
Kaczynski's first mail bomb was directed at Buckley Crist, a professor of materials engineering at Northwestern University. On May 25, 1978, a package bearing Crist's return address was found in a parking lot at the University of Illinois at Chicago. The package was "returned" to Crist, who was suspicious because he had not sent it, so he contacted campus police. Officer Terry Marker opened the package, which exploded and caused minor injuries. Kaczynski had returned to Chicago for the May 1978 bombing and stayed there for a time to work with his father and brother at a foam rubber factory. In August 1978, his brother fired him for writing insulting limericks about a female supervisor Ted had dated briefly. The supervisor later recalled Kaczynski as intelligent and quiet but remembered little of their acquaintanceship and firmly denied they had had any romantic relationship. Kaczynski's second bomb was sent nearly one year after the first one, again to Northwestern University. The bomb, concealed inside a cigar box and left on a table, caused minor injuries to graduate student John Harris when he opened it.

=== Airline bombing and clues ===
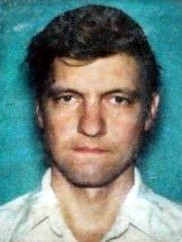
Driver's license photo of Kaczynski from 1978, around the time the first bombs were mailed

In 1979, a bomb was placed in the cargo hold of American Airlines Flight 444, a Boeing 727 flying from Chicago to Washington, D.C. The bomb released smoke, which caused the pilots to carry out an emergency landing. Authorities said it had enough power to "obliterate the plane" had it exploded. "Kaczynski had used a barometer-triggered device, and it had succeeded only in setting some mailbags on fire and forcing an emergency landing; in a letter written years later, the Unabomber expressed relief that the airline bomb had failed since its target had been too indiscriminate." Kaczynski sent his next bomb to the president of United Airlines, Percy Wood. Wood received cuts and burns over most of his body.

Kaczynski left false clues in most bombs, which he intentionally made hard to find to make them appear more legitimate. Clues included metal plates stamped with the initials "FC" hidden somewhere (usually in the pipe end cap) in bombs, a note left in a bomb that did not detonate reading "Wu—It works! I told you it would—RV," and the Eugene O'Neill one-dollar stamps often used as postage on his boxes. He sent one bomb embedded in a copy of Sloan Wilson's novel Ice Brothers. The FBI theorized that Kaczynski's crimes involved a theme of nature, trees, and wood. He often included bits of a tree branch and bark in his bombs; his selected targets included Percy Wood and LeRoy Wood. The crime writer Robert Graysmith noted his "obsession with wood" was "a large factor" in the bombings.

=== Later bombings ===
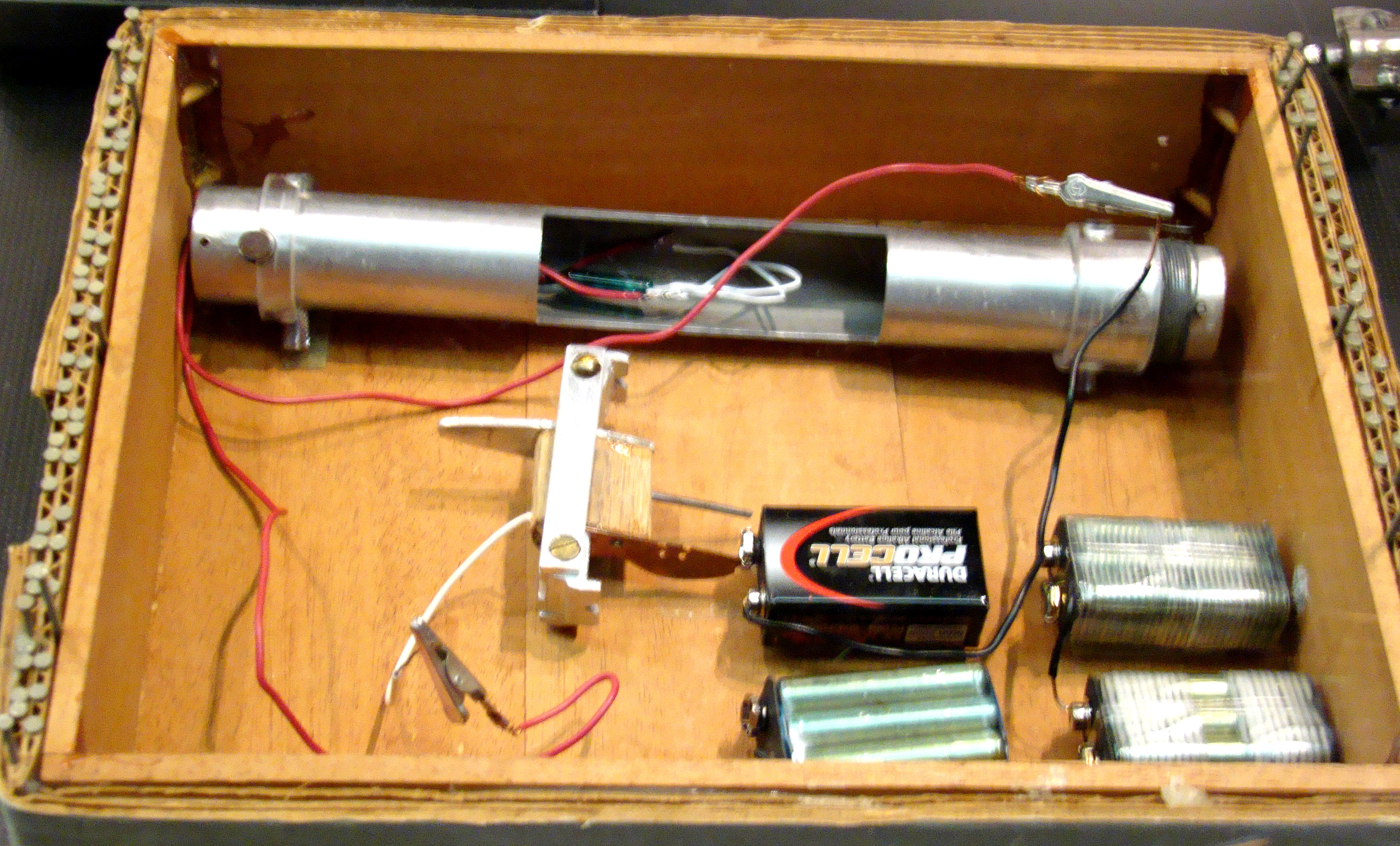
An FBI reproduction of one of Kaczynski's bombs, once on display at the now defunct Newseum in Washington, D.C.

In 1981, a package bearing the return address of a Brigham Young University professor of electrical engineering, LeRoy Wood Bearnson, was discovered in a hallway at the University of Utah. It was brought to the campus police and was defused by a bomb squad. The following May, a bomb was sent to Patrick C. Fischer, a professor of computer science at Vanderbilt University. The package exploded when Fischer's secretary, Janet Smith, opened it, and Smith received injuries to her face and arms.

Kaczynski's next two bombs targeted people at the University of California, Berkeley. The first, in July 1982, caused serious injuries to engineering professor Diogenes Angelakos. Nearly three years later, in May 1985, John Hauser, a graduate student and captain in the United States Air Force, lost four fingers and vision in one eye. Kaczynski handcrafted the bomb from wooden parts. A bomb sent to the Boeing Company in Auburn, Washington, was defused by a bomb squad the following month. In November 1985, biology and animal psychology professor James V. McConnell and research assistant Nicklaus Suino were both severely injured after Suino opened a mail bomb addressed to McConnell.

In late 1985, a nail-and-splinter-loaded bomb in the parking lot of a computer store in Sacramento, California, killed the 38-year-old store owner Hugh Scrutton. On February 20, 1987, a bomb disguised as a piece of lumber injured Gary Wright in the parking lot of a computer store in Salt Lake City, Utah; nerves in Wright's left arm were severed, and at least 200 pieces of shrapnel entered his body. Kaczynski was spotted while planting the Salt Lake City bomb. This led to a widely distributed sketch of the suspect as a hooded man with a mustache and aviator sunglasses.

In 1993, after a six-year break, Kaczynski mailed a bomb to the home of Charles Epstein from the University of California, San Francisco. Epstein lost several fingers upon opening the package. On the same weekend, Kaczynski mailed a bomb to David Gelernter, a computer science professor at Yale University. Gelernter lost sight in one eye, hearing in one ear, and a portion of his right hand.

In 1994, Burson-Marsteller executive Thomas J. Mosser was killed after opening a mail bomb sent to his home in New Jersey. In a letter to The New York Times, Kaczynski wrote he had sent the bomb because of Mosser's work repairing the public image of Exxon after the Exxon Valdez oil spill. This was followed by the 1995 murder of Gilbert Brent Murray, president of the timber industry lobbying group California Forestry Association, by a mail bomb addressed to previous president William Dennison, who had retired. Geneticist Phillip Sharp at the Massachusetts Institute of Technology received a threatening letter shortly afterward.

== Manifesto ==
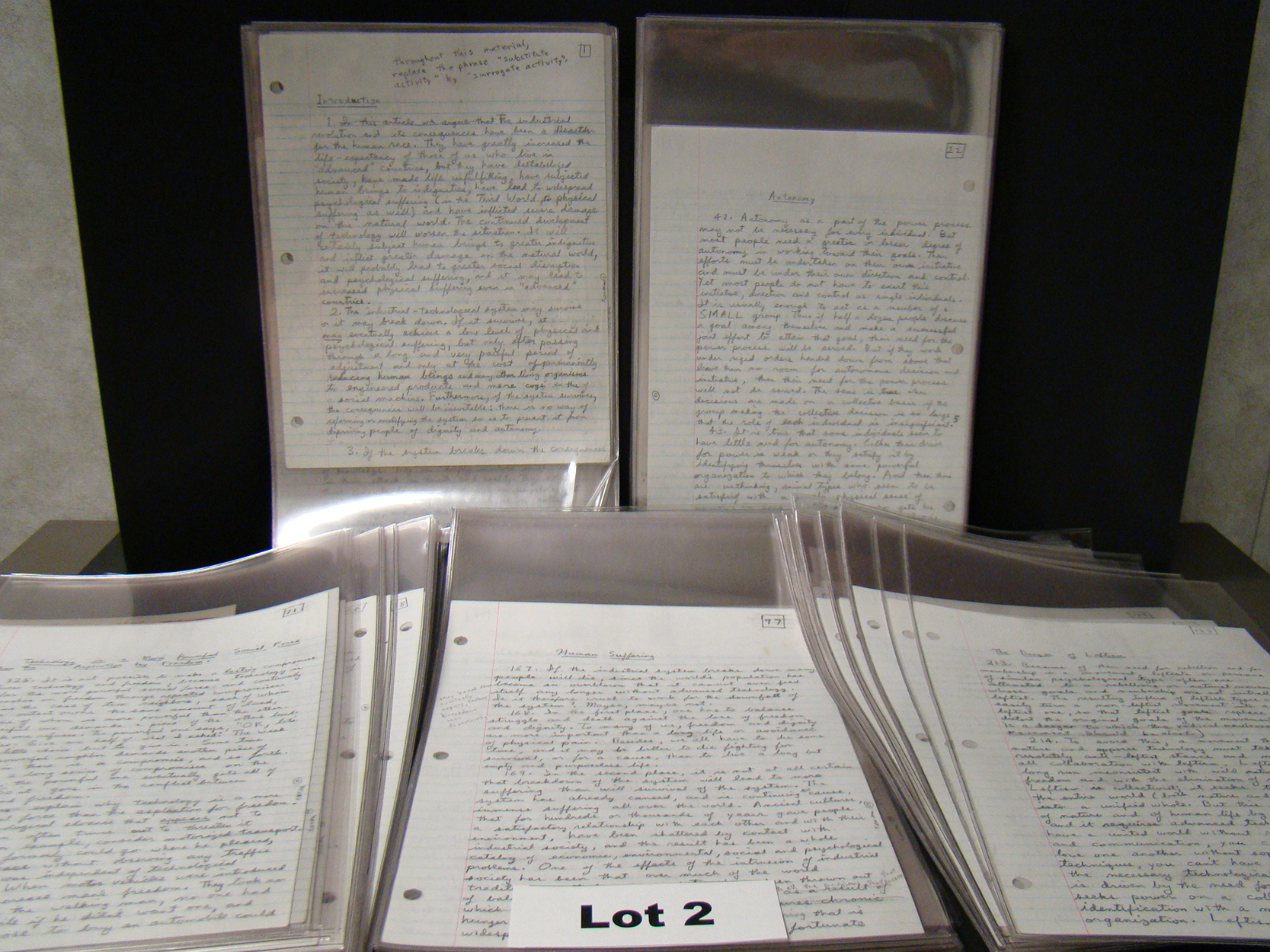
The handwritten draft of Industrial Society and Its Future

In 1995, Kaczynski mailed several letters to media outlets outlining his goals and demanding a major newspaper print his 35,000-word essay Industrial Society and Its Future (dubbed the "Unabomber manifesto" by the FBI) verbatim. He stated he would "desist from terrorism" if this demand was met. There was controversy as to whether the essay should be published, but Attorney General Janet Reno and FBI director Louis Freeh recommended its publication out of concern for public safety and in the hope that a reader could identify the author. Bob Guccione of Penthouse volunteered to publish it. Kaczynski replied Penthouse was less "respectable" than The New York Times and The Washington Post, and said that, "to increase our chances of getting our stuff published in some 'respectable' periodical", he would "reserve the right to plant one (and only one) bomb intended to kill, after our manuscript has been published" if Penthouse published the document instead of The Times or The Post. The Washington Post published the essay on September 19, 1995.

Kaczynski used a typewriter to write his manuscript, capitalizing entire words for emphasis, in lieu of italics. He always referred to himself as either "we" or "FC" ("Freedom Club"), though there is no evidence that he worked with others. Donald Wayne Foster analyzed the writing at the request of Kaczynski's defense team in 1996 and noted that it contained irregular spelling and hyphenation, along with other linguistic idiosyncrasies. This led him to conclude that Kaczynski was its author.

=== Summary ===
Industrial Society and Its Future begins with the assertion: "The Industrial Revolution and its consequences have been a disaster for the human race." Kaczynski wrote that technology has had a destabilizing effect on society, has made life unfulfilling, and has caused widespread psychological suffering. He then called for a revolution to force the collapse of the worldwide technological system, and held a life close to nature, in particular primitivist lifestyles, as an ultimate ideal.

Kaczynski attributed the psychological and social issues of society to the technological system because in his words, the system "requires people to live under conditions radically different from those under which the human race evolved". He argued that most people spend their time engaged in ultimately unfulfilling pursuits to cope with these abnormal conditions; he called these "surrogate activities", wherein people strive toward artificial goals, including scientific work, consumption of entertainment, political activism, and following sports teams. Kaczynski states people do "surrogate activities" to satisfy the "power process" in which people strive to be independent and to achieve power over themselves. He predicted that technological advances would lead to extensive and ultimately oppressive forms of human control, including genetic engineering, and that human beings would be adjusted to meet the needs of social systems rather than vice versa. In the end, Kaczynski predicted that with the rise of artificial superintelligence, the mass of the population would become a "useless burden on the system", and the elite would either keep them in a genetically manipulated state of subservience or eliminate them altogether.

Kaczynski argued that the erosion of human freedom is a natural product of an industrial society because "the system has to regulate human behavior closely in order to function", and that reform of the system is impossible. He said that the system has not yet fully achieved control over all human behavior and is in the midst of a struggle to gain that control. Kaczynski predicted that the system would break down if it could not achieve significant control and that it is likely this issue would be resolved within the next 40 to 100 years. He argued that technological progress can be stopped, in contrast to the viewpoint of people who he said understand technology's negative effects yet passively accept technology as inevitable. Kaczynski stated that the task of those who oppose industrial society is to promote stress within and upon the society and to propagate an anti-technology ideology, one that offers the counter-ideal of nature. He added that a revolution would be possible only when industrial society is sufficiently unstable.

A significant portion of the document is dedicated to discussing political leftism, with Kaczynski attributing the prevalence and intensity of leftism in society as both a negative symptom of psychological pressures induced by technological conditions as well as an obstacle to the formation of an effective anti-tech revolution. He defined leftists as "mainly socialists, collectivists, 'politically correct' types, feminists, gay and disability activists, animal rights activists and the like". He believed that over-socialization and feelings of inferiority are primary drivers of leftism, and derided it as "one of the most widespread manifestations of the craziness of our world". Kaczynski added that the type of movement he envisioned must be anti-leftist and refrain from collaboration with leftists as, in his view, "leftism is in the long run inconsistent with wild nature, with human freedom and with the elimination of modern technology". He also criticized conservatives, describing them as "fools" who "whine about the decay of traditional values, yet they enthusiastically support technological progress and economic growth."

=== Contemporary reception ===
James Q. Wilson, in a 1998 New York Times op-ed, wrote: "If it is the work of a madman, then the writings of many political philosophers—Jean Jacques Rousseau, Thomas Paine, Karl Marx—are scarcely more sane." He added: "The Unabomber does not like socialization, technology, leftist political causes or conservative attitudes. Apart from his call for an (unspecified) revolution, his paper resembles something that a very good graduate student might have written."

Alston Chase, a fellow alumnus at Harvard University, wrote in 2000 for The Atlantic that "it is true that many believed Kaczynski was insane because they needed to believe it. But the truly disturbing aspect of Kaczynski and his ideas is not that they are so foreign but that they are so familiar." He argued: "We need to see Kaczynski as exceptional—madman or genius—because the alternative is so much more frightening."

=== Other works ===
University of Michigan–Dearborn philosophy professor David Skrbina wrote the introduction to Kaczynski's 2010 anthology Technological Slavery, which includes the original manifesto, letters from Kaczynski to Skrbina, and other essays. Two further editions have been published since 2010, one in 2019 and another in 2022. Kaczynski also wrote a second book in 2016 titled, Anti-Tech Revolution: Why and How, that does not include the manifesto, but delves deeply into an analysis of why technological society cannot be reformed and the dynamics of revolutionary movements. Kaczynski's critiques of civilization bore some similarities to anarcho-primitivism, but he rejected and criticized anarcho-primitivist views. Although Kaczynski and his manifesto have been embraced by ecofascists, he rejected fascism, including those whom he referred to as "the 'ecofascists'", describing ecofascism as "an aberrant branch of leftism". He wrote that the "true anti-tech movement rejects every form of racism or ethnocentrism", adding that racial division would undermine such efforts by fostering conflict and competition which would in turn drive technological growth.

== Investigation ==
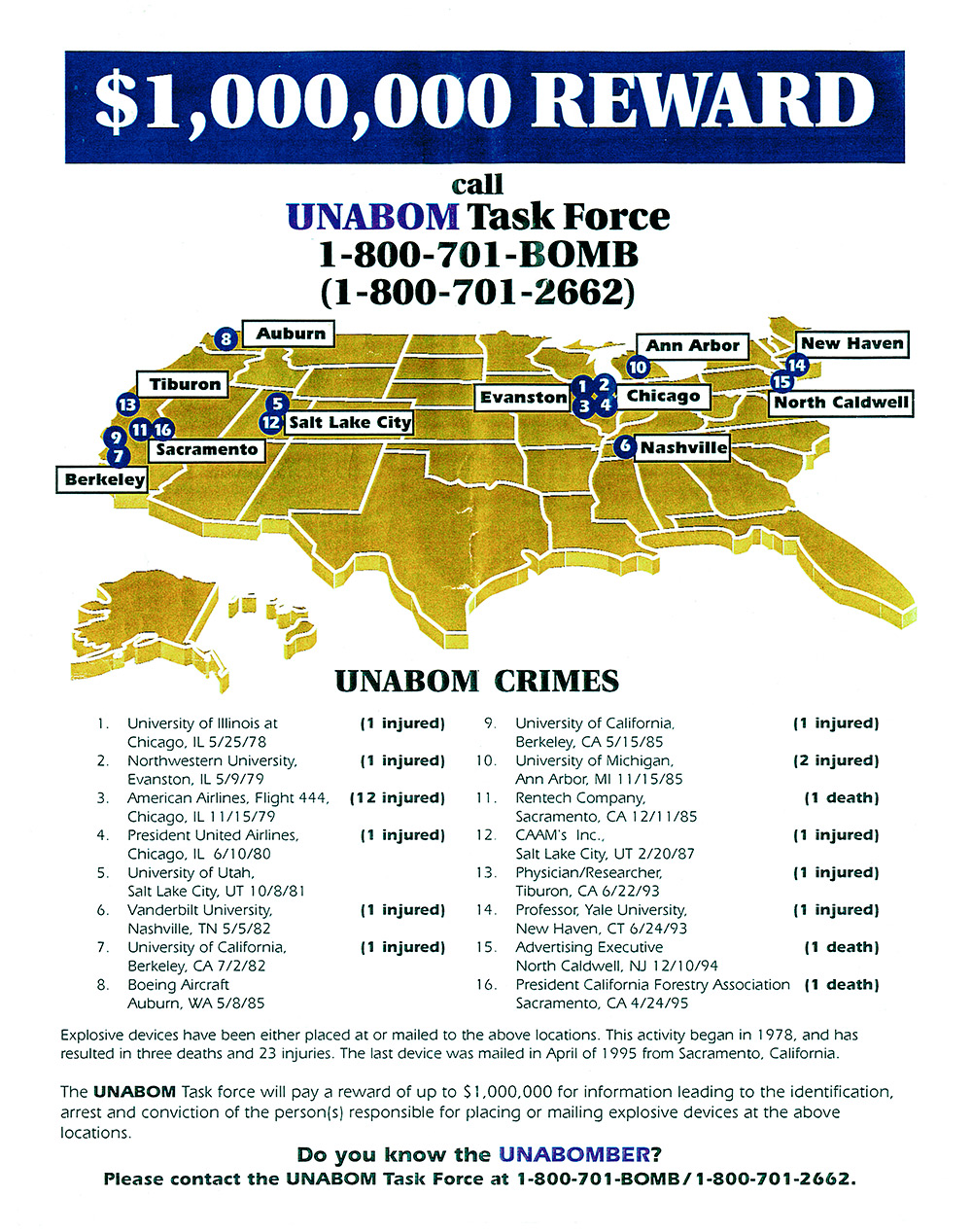
FBI poster offering a $1 million (equivalent to approximately $2.23 million in 2025) reward for information leading to the Unabomber's capture

Because of the material used to make the mail bombs, U.S. postal inspectors, who initially had responsibility for the case, labeled the suspect the "Junkyard Bomber". FBI Inspector Terry D. Turchie was appointed to run the UNABOM (University and Airline Bombing) investigation. In 1979, an FBI-led task force that included 125 agents from the FBI, the Bureau of Alcohol, Tobacco and Firearms (ATF), and the U.S. Postal Inspection Service was formed. The task force grew to more than 150 full-time personnel, but minute analysis of recovered components of the bombs and the investigation into the lives of the victims proved of little use in identifying the suspect, who built the bombs primarily from scrap materials available almost anywhere. Investigators later learned that the victims were chosen indiscriminately from library research.

In 1980, chief agent John Douglas, working with agents in the FBI's Behavioral Sciences Unit, issued a psychological profile of the unidentified bomber. It described the offender as a man with above-average intelligence and connections to academia. This profile was later refined to characterize the offender as a neo-Luddite holding an academic degree in the hard sciences, but this psychologically based profile was discarded in 1983. FBI analysts developed an alternative theory that concentrated on the physical evidence in recovered bomb fragments. In this rival profile, the suspect was characterized as a blue-collar airplane mechanic. The UNABOM Task Force set up a toll-free telephone hotline to take calls related to the investigation, with a $1 million (equivalent to approximately $2.23 million in 2025) reward for anyone who could provide information leading to the Unabomber's capture.

At one point in 1993, investigators sought someone whose first name was "Nathan" because the name was imprinted on the envelope of a letter sent to the media.

Before the publication of Industrial Society and Its Future, Kaczynski's brother, David, was encouraged by his wife to follow up on suspicions that Ted was the Unabomber. David was dismissive at first, but he took the likelihood more seriously after reading the manifesto a week after it was published in September 1995. He searched through old family papers and found letters dating to the 1970s that Ted had sent to newspapers to protest the abuses of technology using phrasing similar to that in the manifesto.

Before the manifesto's publication, the FBI held many press conferences asking the public to help identify the Unabomber. They were convinced that the bomber was from the Chicago area where he began his bombings, had worked in or had some connection to Salt Lake City, and by the 1990s had some association with the San Francisco Bay Area. This geographical information and the wording in excerpts from the manifesto that were released before the entire text of the manifesto was published persuaded David's wife to urge him to read it.

=== After publication ===
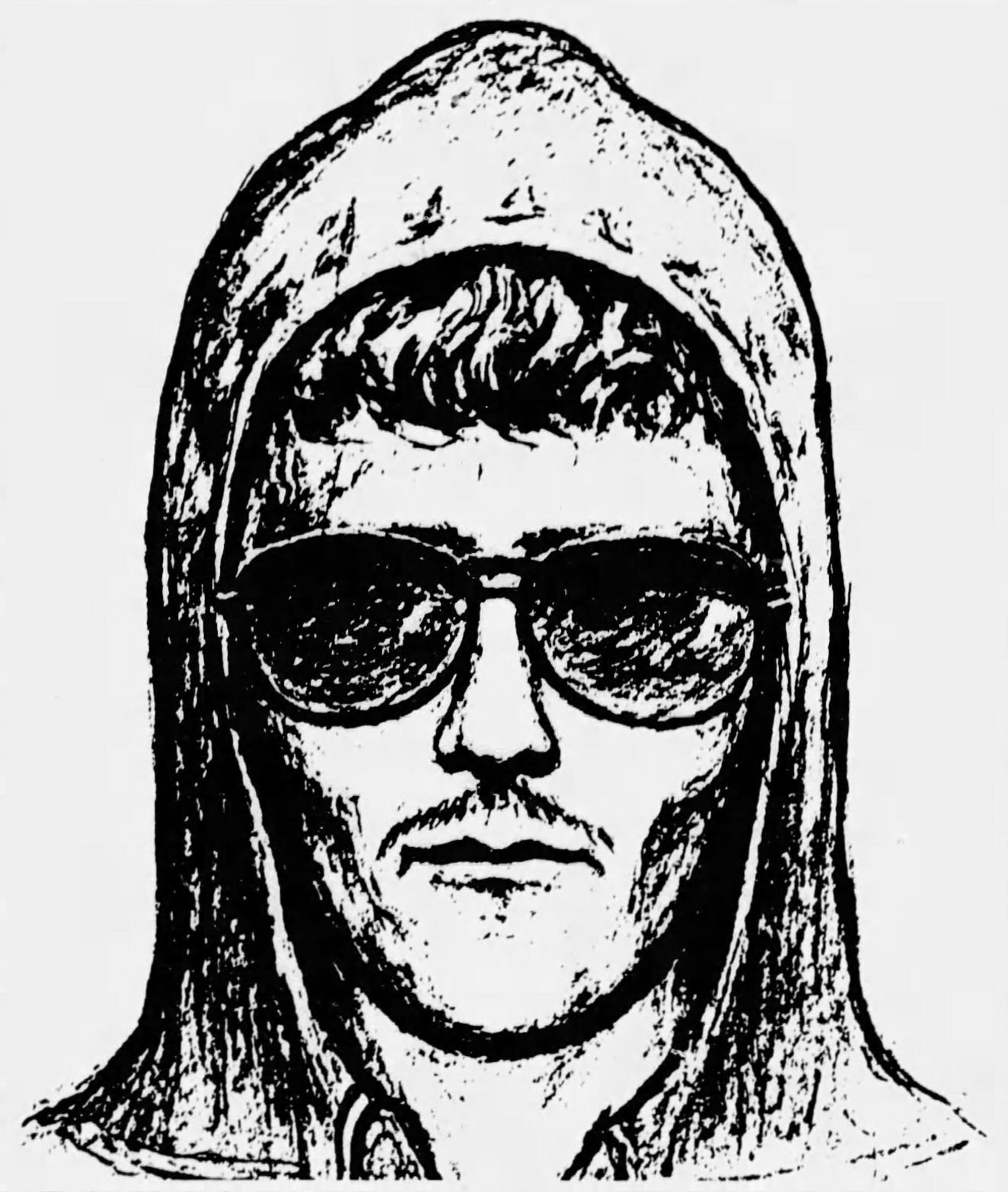
This 1987 suspect sketch of the Unabomber followed the Salt Lake City bombing that injured Gary Wright. It was superseded by a more iconic sketch by Jeanne Boylan in 1994, but it was the first to show him in his hooded sweatshirt and sunglasses.

After the manifesto was published, the FBI received thousands of tips. While the FBI reviewed new leads, Kaczynski's brother, David, hired private investigator Susan Swanson in Chicago to investigate Ted's activities discreetly. David later hired Washington, D.C. attorney Tony Bisceglie to organize the evidence acquired by Swanson and contact the FBI, given the presumed difficulty of attracting the FBI's attention. Kaczynski's family wanted to protect him from the danger of an FBI raid, such as those at Ruby Ridge or Waco, since they feared a violent outcome from any attempt by the FBI to contact Kaczynski.

In early 1996, an investigator working with Bisceglie contacted former FBI hostage negotiator and criminal profiler Clinton R. Van Zandt. Bisceglie asked him to compare the manifesto to typewritten copies of handwritten letters David had received from his brother. Van Zandt's initial analysis determined that there was better than a 60 percent chance that the same person had written the manifesto, which had been in public circulation for half a year. Van Zandt's second analytical team determined a higher likelihood. He recommended Bisceglie's client contact the FBI immediately.

In February 1996, Bisceglie gave a copy of a 1971 essay written by Kaczynski to Molly Flynn at the FBI. She forwarded the essay to the San Francisco-based task force. FBI profiler James R. Fitzgerald recognized similarities in the writings using linguistic analysis and determined that the author of the essays and the manifesto was almost certainly the same person. Combined with facts gleaned from the bombings and Kaczynski's life, the analysis provided the basis for an affidavit signed by Terry Turchie, the head of the entire investigation, in support of the application for a search warrant.

Kaczynski's brother, David, had tried to remain anonymous, but he was soon identified. Within a few days, an FBI agent team was dispatched to interview David and his wife with their attorney in Washington, D.C. At this and subsequent meetings, David provided letters written by his brother in their original envelopes, allowing the FBI task force to use the postmark dates to add more detail to their timeline of Ted's activities.

David had once admired and emulated his older brother but had since left the survivalist lifestyle behind. He had received assurances from the FBI that he would remain anonymous and that his brother would not learn who had turned him in, but his identity was leaked to CBS News in early April 1996. CBS anchorman Dan Rather called FBI director Louis Freeh, who requested 24 hours before CBS broke the story on the evening news. The FBI scrambled to finish the search warrant and have it issued by a federal judge in Montana; afterward, the FBI conducted an internal leak investigation, but the source of the leak was never identified.

FBI officials were not unanimous in identifying Ted as the author of the manifesto. The search warrant noted that several experts believed the manifesto had been written by another individual.

=== Arrest ===
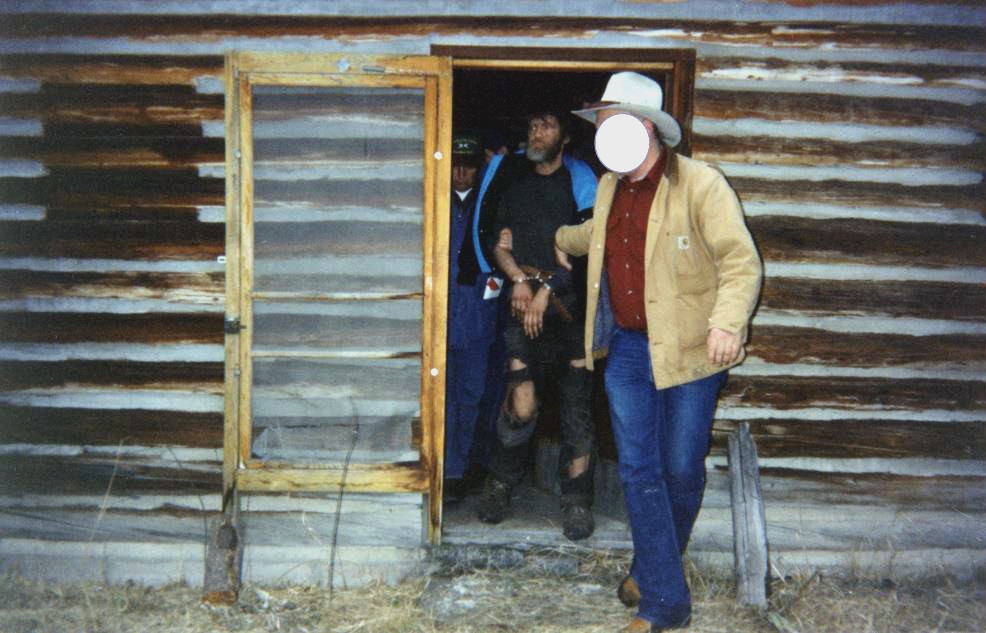
Kaczynski's arrest

FBI agents arrested an unkempt Kaczynski at his cabin on April 3, 1996. A search revealed a cache of bomb components, 40,000 hand-written journal pages that included bomb-making experiments, descriptions of the Unabomber crimes, improvised firearms, and one live bomb. They also found what appeared to be the original typed manuscript of Industrial Society and Its Future. At this point in time, the Unabomber had been the target of the most expensive investigation in FBI history. A 2000 report by the United States Commission on the Advancement of Federal Law Enforcement stated that the task force had spent over $50 million (equivalent to approximately $93.5 million in 2025) on the investigation.

After his capture, theories emerged naming Kaczynski as the Zodiac Killer, who murdered five people in Northern California from 1968 to 1969. Among the links that raised suspicion were that Kaczynski lived in the San Francisco Bay Area from 1967 to 1969, that both individuals were highly intelligent with an interest in bombs and codes, and that both wrote letters to newspapers demanding the publication of their works with the threat of continued violence if the demand was not met. Kaczynski's whereabouts could not be verified for all of the killings. Since the gun and knife murders committed by the Zodiac Killer differed from Kaczynski's bombings, authorities did not pursue him as a suspect. Robert Graysmith, author of the 1986 book Zodiac, said the similarities are "fascinating" but purely coincidental.

=== Diary and cipher ===
Theodore Kaczynski maintained extensive personal journals spanning more than 25 years, from approximately 1969 until his arrest in 1996. These journals, totaling over 40,000 handwritten pages, documented his daily life, philosophical beliefs, emotional state, and detailed accounts of his criminal activities, including bomb-making experiments and the Unabomber attacks. Some entries were written in plain text, while others were encrypted using two custom cipher systems Kaczynski developed to conceal sensitive information. The journals were discovered during the FBI raid on his Montana cabin on April 3, 1996. Kaczynski's journals often mixed plain text with enciphered sections, particularly in notebooks where he recorded his crimes. For instance, a 1979 journal entry written in plain text bragged about early acts of vandalism and sabotage, such as adding sugar to fuel tanks, breaking windows, and setting traps for motorcyclists, as part of his efforts to disrupt technological society. In enciphered entries, he detailed his bombings, expressing frustration over non-lethal outcomes and satisfaction when devices caused fatalities. He numbered his bomb-making experiments, such as "Experiment 97" which killed Hugh Scrutton in 1985, and "Experiment 244" which killed Thomas Mosser in 1994, noting technical details like chemical mixtures, weights, and modifications to enhance lethality. Kaczynski wrote about his motives as personal revenge against technological society, without remorse, stating in a 1971 entry: "My motive for doing what I am going to do is simply personal revenge."

Kaczynski created two elaborate cipher systems, referred to as Code #I and Code #II, to encrypt portions of his journals. These systems used sequences of numbers as ciphertext, combined with a "List of Meanings" that mapped numbers to letters, words, or punctuation, and incorporated misdirections such as intentional errors, foreign words (e.g., German), misspellings, and random punctuation to complicate decryption. Code #I, the more complex system, was documented in "Notebook X" and involved a 54x42 grid matrix to generate a long key sequence through four reading phases (horizontal, vertical, diagonal). Decryption required modulo 90 addition of ciphertext numbers to the key, followed by substitution using the List of Meanings and manual corrections for misdirections. Code #II functioned as a one-time pad, a type of potentially unbreakable encryption assuming the key is never compromised, using two notebooks (A for ciphertext, B for pad numbers) with modulo 100 subtraction before substitution. Both systems were designed for personal use, making them highly complex but impractical for communication. The ciphers were broken by the FBI after discovering the keys, grids, notebooks, and instructions in Kaczynski's cabin. FBI cryptanalyst Michael Birch decoded the journals, which served as key evidence in the case. Without these materials, the ciphers would have been nearly impossible to crack due to their length and randomness.

=== Guilty plea ===
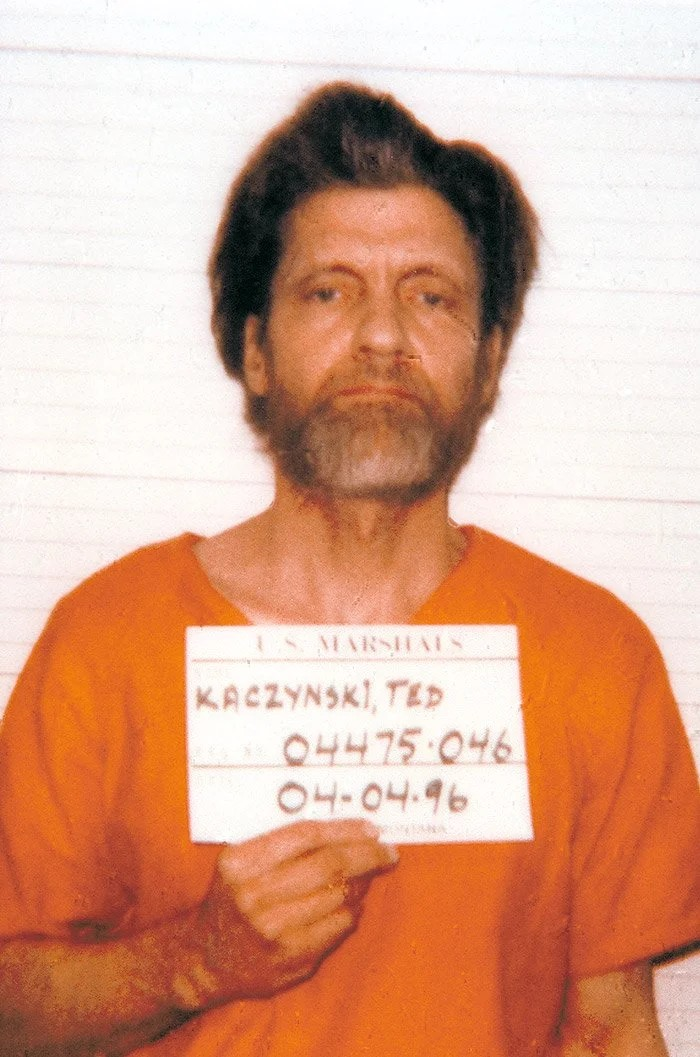
U.S. Marshals Service mugshot of Kaczynski, 1996

A federal grand jury indicted Kaczynski in June 1996 on ten counts of illegally transporting, mailing, and using bombs. Kaczynski's lawyers, headed by Montana federal public defenders Michael Donahoe and Judy Clarke, attempted to enter an insanity defense to avoid the death penalty, but Kaczynski rejected this strategy. On January 8, 1998, he asked to dismiss his lawyers and hire Tony Serra as his counsel; Serra had agreed not to use an insanity defense and instead promised to base a defense on Kaczynski's anti-technology views. After this request was unsuccessful, Kaczynski tried to kill himself on January 9. Sally Johnson, the psychiatrist who examined Kaczynski, concluded that he suffered from "paranoid" schizophrenia, though the validity of this diagnosis has been criticized.

Forensic psychiatrist Park Dietz said Kaczynski was not psychotic, but had a schizoid or schizotypal personality disorder. In his 2010 book Technological Slavery, Kaczynski said that two prison psychologists who visited him frequently for four years told him they saw no indication that he suffered from paranoid schizophrenia and the diagnosis was "ridiculous" and a "political diagnosis". Some contemporary authors suggest that people (notably Kaczynski's brother and mother) purposely spread the image of Kaczynski as mentally ill intending to save his life.

On January 21, 1998, Kaczynski was declared competent to stand trial by federal prison psychiatrist Johnson "despite the psychiatric diagnoses" and prosecutors sought the death penalty. Kaczynski pleaded guilty to all charges on January 22, 1998, accepting life imprisonment without the possibility of parole. He later tried to withdraw this plea, claiming the judge had coerced him, but Judge Garland Ellis Burrell Jr. denied his request and the United States Court of Appeals for the Ninth Circuit upheld that denial.

In 2006, Burrell ordered that items from Kaczynski's cabin be sold at a "reasonably advertised Internet auction". Items considered to be bomb-making materials, such as diagrams and "recipes" for bombs, were excluded. The net proceeds went toward the $15 million (equivalent to approximately $23.96 million in 2025) in restitution Burrell had awarded Kaczynski's victims. Kaczynski's correspondence and other personal papers were also auctioned. Burrell ordered the removal, before sale, of references in those documents to Kaczynski's victims; Kaczynski unsuccessfully challenged those redactions as a violation of his freedom of speech. The auction ran for two weeks in 2011, and raised over $232,000 (equivalent to approximately $332,000 in 2025). Following Kaczynski's sentencing to life without parole, he gifted his cabin to Scharlette Holdman, an anti-death penalty activist and mitigation specialist who played a role in preventing him from receiving the death penalty. The U.S. government refused to allow Holdman to keep the shack.

== Incarceration and death ==
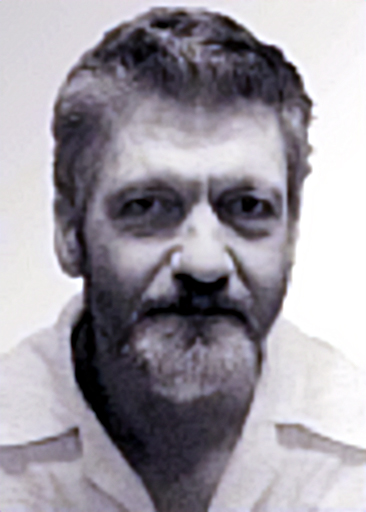
Kaczynski in prison (1999)

Almost immediately after being convicted, Kaczynski began serving his life sentences without the possibility of parole at ADX Florence, a supermax prison in Florence, Colorado. Early in his imprisonment, Kaczynski befriended Ramzi Yousef and Timothy McVeigh, the perpetrators of the 1993 World Trade Center bombing and the 1995 Oklahoma City bombing, respectively; they discussed religion and politics and formed a friendship which lasted until McVeigh's execution in 2001. Kaczynski stated about McVeigh: "On a personal level I like McVeigh and I imagine that most people would like him," but also stated, "assuming that the Oklahoma City bombing was intended as a protest against the U.S. government in general and against the government's actions at Waco in particular, I will say that I think the bombing was a bad action because it was unnecessarily inhumane."

In October 2005, Kaczynski offered to donate two rare books to the Melville J. Herskovits Library of African Studies at Northwestern University's campus in Evanston, Illinois, the location of his first two attacks. The library rejected the offer because it already had copies of the works. The Labadie Collection, part of the University of Michigan's Special Collections Library, houses Kaczynski's correspondence with over 400 people since his arrest, including replies, legal documents, publications, and clippings in their own sub-collection titled, "Ted Kaczynski Papers, 1996–2014 (majority within 1996–2005)". His writings are among the most popular selections in the University of Michigan's special collections. The identity of most correspondents will remain sealed until 2049.

In 2012, Kaczynski responded to the Harvard Alumni Association's directory inquiry for the fiftieth reunion of the class of 1962; he listed his occupation as "prisoner" and eight life sentences as "awards".

In 2011, Kaczynski was a person of interest in the Chicago Tylenol murders. Kaczynski was willing to provide a DNA sample to the FBI but later withheld it as a bargaining chip for his legal efforts against the FBI's private auction of his confiscated property. The U.S. government seized Kaczynski's cabin, which they put on display at the Newseum in Washington, D.C. It remained at the Newseum until late 2019, when it was transferred to a nearby FBI museum.

In March 2021, Kaczynski complained of rectal bleeding and was diagnosed with rectal cancer. On December 14, 2021, he was transferred to Federal Medical Center, Butner, in North Carolina. Kaczynski was receiving biweekly chemotherapy until March 2023, when he began to decline all treatment due to unpleasant side effects and his poor prognosis. In May 2023, Kaczynski was noted by a prison oncologist to be "depressed" and was referred for a psychiatric evaluation.

At 12:23 a.m. on June 10, 2023, Kaczynski was found in his cell unresponsive, with no pulse, after hanging himself from a handicap rail with a shoelace. Prison employees immediately began resuscitation measures, including chest compressions. He was taken to Duke University Hospital in Durham, North Carolina, where his blood pressure remained low until he was pronounced dead at 8:07 a.m. EDT.

== Legacy ==
Bumper sticker reading "Montana...Home of the Unabomber, Freemen and Greater Yellowstone Flyfishers!

Kaczynski has inspired and been depicted in many artistic works in popular culture. These include the 1996 television film Unabomber: The True Story, the 2011 play P.O. Box Unabomber, the 2012 documentary Stemple Pass, Manhunt: Unabomber, the 2017 season of the television series Manhunt, the 2020 miniseries Unabomber: In His Own Words, the 2021 film Ted K and the 2026 Netflix film Unabomber. The moniker "Unabomber" was also applied to the Italian Unabomber, a terrorist who conducted attacks similar to Kaczynski's in Italy from 1994 to 2006, and the Austrian Unabomber, who killed 4 people and injured 15 with 3 IEDs and 24 mail bombs between 1993 and 1997. Prior to the 1996 United States presidential election, a campaign called "Unabomber for President" was launched with the goal of electing Kaczynski as president through write-in votes.

In his book The Age of Spiritual Machines (1999), futurist Ray Kurzweil quoted a passage from Kaczynski's manifesto Industrial Society and Its Future. Kaczynski was referenced by Bill Joy, co-founder of Sun Microsystems, in the 2000 Wired article "Why the Future Doesn't Need Us". Joy stated that Kaczynski "is clearly a Luddite, but simply saying this does not dismiss his argument". Professor Jean-Marie Apostolidès has raised questions surrounding the ethics of spreading Kaczynski's views. Various radical movements and extremists have been influenced by Kaczynski. People inspired by Kaczynski's ideas include members of nihilist, anarchist, and eco-extremist movements; as well as conservative intellectuals. Anders Behring Breivik, the far-right perpetrator of the 2011 Norway attacks, published a manifesto which plagiarized large portions from Industrial Society and Its Future, with certain terms substituted (e.g., replacing "leftists" with "cultural Marxists" and "multiculturalists").

Over twenty years after Kaczynski's imprisonment, his views had inspired an online community of primitivists and neo-Luddites, some of which call him "Uncle Ted". One explanation for the renewal of interest in his views is the television series Manhunt: Unabomber, which aired in 2017. Another explanation is that a new generation has adopted Kaczynski's anti-tech philosophy because they believe his reasoning is sound and his "observations about technology and the environment have proven to be prescient". Kaczynski is also frequently referred to by ecofascists online. Although some militant fascist and neo-Nazi groups idolize him, Kaczynski described fascism in his manifesto as a "kook ideology" and Nazism as "evil". Merrick Garland, who would later serve as United States attorney general, has cited the Unabomber case as among the most important cases he worked on.

== Published works ==
=== Mathematical ===
- Kaczynski, Theodore (June–July 1964). "Another Proof of Wedderburn's Theorem". American Mathematical Monthly. 71 (6): 652–653. doi:10.2307/2312328. JSTOR 2312328. A proof of Wedderburn's little theorem in abstract algebra
- Peleg, Bezalel; ——; Redheffer, R. M.; Carlitz, L.; Seidman, T. I.; Nix, E. D.; Wilansky, A.; Wyler, Oswald; Hajek, Otomar (June–July 1964). "Advanced Problem 5210". American Mathematical Monthly. 71 (6): 689. doi:10.2307/2312349. JSTOR 2312349. A challenge problem in abstract algebra
- ——; Bilyeu, R. G. (June–July 1965). "Distributivity and (−1)x = −x (Advanced Problem 5210, with Solution by Bilyeu, R.G.)". American Mathematical Monthly. 72 (6): 677–678. doi:10.2307/2313887. JSTOR 2313887. Reprint and solution to "Advanced Problem 5210" (above)
- —— (July 1965). "Boundary Functions for Functions Defined in a Disk". Journal of Mathematics and Mechanics. 14 (4): 589–612.
- —— (November 1966). "On a Boundary Property of Continuous Functions". Michigan Mathematical Journal. 13 (3): 313–320. doi:10.1307/mmj/1031732782. ISSN 0026-2285.
- —— (1967). Boundary Functions (PDF) (PhD thesis). University of Michigan. Kaczynski's doctoral dissertation. Complete dissertation available for purchase from ProQuest, with publication number 6717790.
- —— (March–April 1968). "Note on a Problem of Alan Sutcliffe". Mathematics Magazine. 41 (2): 84–86. doi:10.2307/2689056. JSTOR 2689056. A brief paper in number theory concerning the digits of numbers
- —— (March 1969). "Boundary Functions for Bounded Harmonic Functions". Transactions of the American Mathematical Society. 137: 203–209. doi:10.2307/1994796. JSTOR 1994796. Archived (PDF) from the original on January 16, 2017.
- —— (July 1969). "Boundary Functions and Sets of Curvilinear Convergence for Continuous Functions" (PDF). Transactions of the American Mathematical Society. 141: 107–125. doi:10.2307/1995093. JSTOR 1995093. Archived (PDF) from the original on August 12, 2017.
- —— (November 1969). "The Set of Curvilinear Convergence of a Continuous Function Defined in the Interior of a Cube" (PDF). Proceedings of the American Mathematical Society. 23 (2): 323–327. doi:10.2307/2037166. JSTOR 2037166. Archived (PDF) from the original on August 2, 2017.
- —— (January–February 1971). "Problem 787". Mathematics Magazine. 44 (1): 41. doi:10.2307/2688865. JSTOR 2688865. A challenge problem in geometry
- —— (November–December 1971). "A Match Stick Problem (Problem 787, with Solutions by Gibbs, R.A. and Breisch, R.L.)". Mathematics Magazine. 44 (5): 294–296. doi:10.2307/2688646. JSTOR 2688646. Reprint and solutions to "Problem 787" (above)

=== Philosophical ===
- Kaczynski, Theodore (1995). "Industrial Society and Its Future". The Washington Post. Archived from the original on May 29, 2025.
- Kaczynski, Theodore; Barriot, Patrick; Skrbina, David (2008). The Road to Revolution. Vevey (Suisse) [le Kremlin-Bicêtre]: Éditions Xenia. ISBN 978-2-888920-65-6.
  - —— (2010). Technological Slavery (revised and expanded 2nd ed.). Port Townsend: Feral House. ISBN 978-1-932595-80-2.
  - —— (2019). Technological Slavery: Volume 1 (revised and expanded 3rd ed.). Fitch & Madison Publishers. ISBN 978-1-944228-01-9.
  - —— (2022). Technological Slavery: Volume 1 (enhanced 4th ed.). Fitch & Madison Publishers. ISBN 978-1-944228-03-3.
- Kaczynski, Theodore (2016). Anti-Tech Revolution: Why and How. Fitch & Madison Publishers. ISBN 978-1-944228-00-2.
  - —— (2020). Anti-Tech Revolution: Why and How (revised and expanded 2nd ed.). Fitch & Madison Publishers. ISBN 978-1-944228-02-6.

== See also ==
- Downshifting – Adoption of simpler lifestyle
- Green Scare – US government action against the radical environmental movement
- Oklahoma City bombing – 1995 domestic terrorist attack in Oklahoma, US
- Operation Backfire – Multi agency operation against criminal actions by the radical environmental movement
- Philosophy of technology – Studies of the nature of technology
