= Gergana Dimitrova =

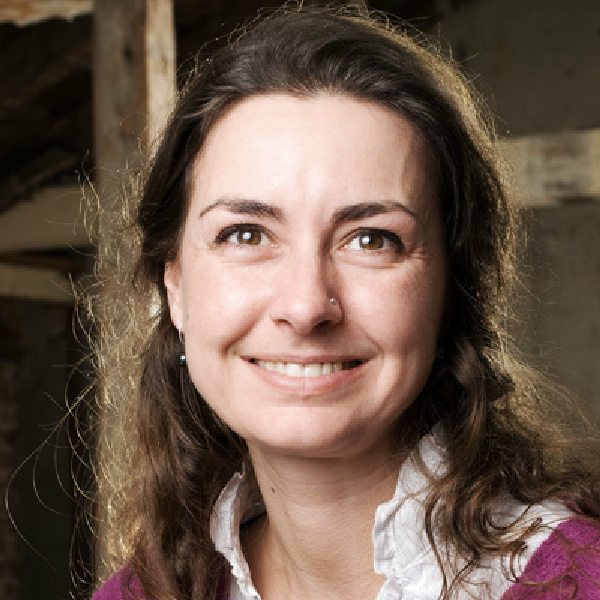
- photo: Vassil Tanev for Sofia Live
- Born: 8 November 1975; Bourgas, Bulgaria
- Occupations: theatre director, playwright
- Employer: 36 monkeys
- Notable work: P.O. Box Unabomber
- Awards: "Ikar" for Best play and "Ikar" for Best director

Gergana Dimitrova (Bulgarian: Гергана Димитрова) is a Bulgarian theatre director, playwright and translator.

== Biography ==
Gergana Dimitrova was born in 1975 in Bourgas. She graduated in Cultural Studies from the University of Sofia (2000), in Theatre Directing from Ernst Busch Academy of Dramatic Arts in Berlin (2005), and the National Academy of Theatre & Film in Sofia (2007).

Dimitrova is a member of the new wave of Bulgarian theatre which succeeded to the one which developed during the years after the end of the communist pro-Soviet regime in 1989. Veneta Doytcheva, a Bulgarian theatre critic, writes about this new wave:—

"The new wave rejects marketing and doesn't accept that the theatre should lose its critical function either. After a period of political apathy, the new generation wants to ask politically and socially committed questions. We are waiting for this trend to develop because, for the moment, it's more a draft than a strongly expressed platform. The youngest directors aren't at all "spoiled children". As always, young people doesn't accept compromises and don't accept work imposed on them from the outside or because of market needs. The freedom of choice is strongly expressed in the selection of plays that are staged. There is a genuine tendency to defend the texts of new European playwrights (Elfride Jelinek, Fritz Kater, Marius von Mayenburg, Torsten Buchsteiner). The non-conformity, revolt, and anxiety revealed in these texts correspond to the living and working conditions of young Bulgarians. The difference in comparison with the previous generation is in the respect of the text and rigorous work on the structure. These young artists look for authors who best represent them and make the most of the literary richness of their plays."

Dimitrova with two other theatre directors, Mladen Alexiev and Vassilena Radeva, founded in 2007 "36 Singes", a NGO "for contemporary alternative art and culture". Each one of them keeps and expresses his personality in his own creations. As a triumvirate, they direct projects oriented towards the translation and promotion of new texts. Gergana Dimitrova is perhaps the only one among them who has directed on a big stage. Her creation of Fritz Kater's Zeit zu lieben zeit zu sterben (Time to Love Time to Die) in the Varna Dramatic Theatre impresses of its richness of thought, precise theatre language and the capacity of synthesis that emerges from this expressive universe.

Dimitrova is one of the creators of the "ProText" platform. It's a several-year program, devoted to research, promotion and the presentation of new plays, young writers and new aesthetics.

Dimitrova lives currently in Sofia.

== Awards and honours ==
She won "Ikar" award of the Union of Bulgarian Artists in 2012 for best theatre play (for P.O. Box Unabomber co-written with Zdrava Kamenova) and "Ikar" for best director the same year (for the performance P.O. Box Unabomber).

== See also ==
- P.O. Box Unabomber
