= American Airlines Flight 444 =

Attempted bombing of flight from Chicago to Washington, D.C.

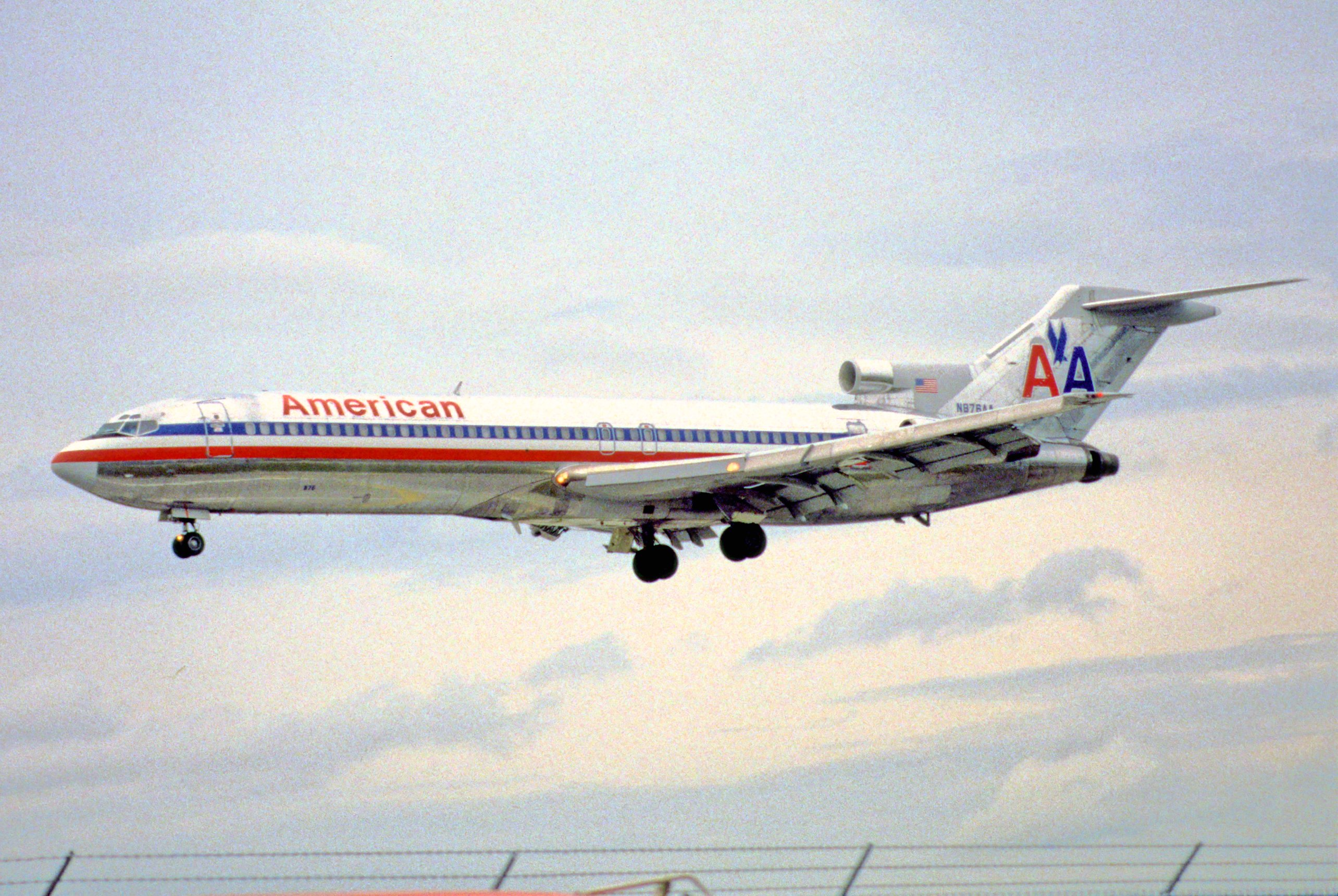
- N876AA, the aircraft involved in the accident, photographed in 1998.

Occurrence
- Date: November 15, 1979
- Summary: Aircraft bombing
- Site: Washington Dulles International Airport. Dulles, Virginia; 38.953°N 77.450°W

Aircraft
- Aircraft type: Boeing 727-223
- Operator: American Airlines
- Registration: N876AA
- Flight origin: Chicago O'Hare International Airport
- Destination: Washington National Airport
- Occupants: 78
- Passengers: 72
- Crew: 6
- Fatalities: 0
- Injuries: 12
- Survivors: 78

American Airlines Flight 444 was a scheduled American Airlines flight from Chicago to Washington, D.C.'s National Airport. On November 15, 1979, the Boeing 727 serving the flight was attacked by Ted Kaczynski (later known as the Unabomber), who sent a pipe bomb in the mail and set it to detonate at a certain altitude. The bomb partially detonated in the cargo hold and caused "a sucking explosion and a loss of pressure," which was then followed by large quantities of smoke filling the passenger cabin, forcing the pilots to make an emergency landing at Dulles International Airport. Twelve passengers had to be treated afterward for smoke inhalation.

The FBI found similarities between the still relatively intact pipe bomb and two bombs that had previously detonated at Northwestern University, and dubbed the unknown University and Airline Bomber the "Unabomber". 17 years later in 1996, Kaczynski's arrest ended one of the longest and most expensive manhunts in FBI history.
