= Unabomber: In His Own Words =

2020 crime documentary miniseries

- Genre: True crime
- Directed by: Mick Grogan
- Opening theme: "MAN" by The Worst

Production
- Producers: Elliott Halpern; Elizabeth Trojian
- Production companies: Reelz; Yap Films

Original release
- Network: Netflix
- Release: February 22, 2020

Unabomber: In His Own Words is a 2020 crime documentary four-part miniseries about Ted Kaczynski, also known as the Unabomber, that looks at his 17 years of terror from 1978 to 1995 that killed three people and injured 23.

The documentary includes interviews of various people involved in the life and arrest of Kaczynski, including Joel Moss (member of the FBI's UNABOM task force), Gary Wright (survivor of one of Kaczynski's bombs), and David Kaczynski and Linda Patrik (Ted Kaczynski's brother and sister-in-law, who alerted the FBI about Ted in 1996), along with snippets of an interview with Kaczynski himself, carried out by Theresa Kintz, an anarchist writer, in 1999.

The theme song of the show, "MAN", was composed by Adam Litovitz and Louis Percival, and is performed by the band The Worst.

The series premiered February 28, 2020 on Discovery Channel Canada, and was distributed internationally on Netflix. The series received a Canadian Screen Award nomination for Best History Documentary Program or Series at the 9th Canadian Screen Awards in 2021.
