= Italian Unabomber =

Unknown serial bomber (active 1994–2006)

- Status: At large
- Motive: Unknown

Details
- Span of crimes: 1994–2007
- Killed: 0
- Injured: 17+

The Italian Unabomber (/ˈjuːnəbɒmər/, Italian pronunciation: [ˌunaˈbɔmber]) is the moniker referring to an unidentified serial bomber who carried out a series of bombings in the Veneto and Friuli-Venezia Giulia regions of Italy between 1994 and 2007.

The Italian Unabomber placed small booby-trapped objects in public spaces in Veneto and Friuli-Venezia Giulia which were designed to detonate when handled by a passerby and seriously injure but not kill the victim. The Italian Unabomber was named by the international press in reference to Ted Kaczynski, the American Neo-Luddite terrorist and mail bomber known as the "Unabomber", but the Italian bomber made no political or economic demands. Over 30 explosive devices were attributed to the Italian Unabomber, and resulted in numerous people receiving injuries including the removal of digits and limbs.

On 28 August 2006, Italian police raided the house of Elvo Zornitta, a 49-year-old engineer, who had been under surveillance for a year with assistance from the United States' Federal Bureau of Investigation. In January 2009, after years of investigations, the case was dropped after the prosecutors asked for its dismissal due to lack of evidence. Zornitta received €300,000 as compensation for his arrest and trial, which included false evidence.

The last bomb was located on 28 October 2007.

To this day, the Italian Unabomber remains unidentified. In October 2022, at the request of a journalist and a victim, the case was reopened by the local prosecutor's office thanks to the discovery of DNA and blood traces that once could not be analysed due to lack of suitable technologies.

== Biographical profile ==
=== Origin of the name ===
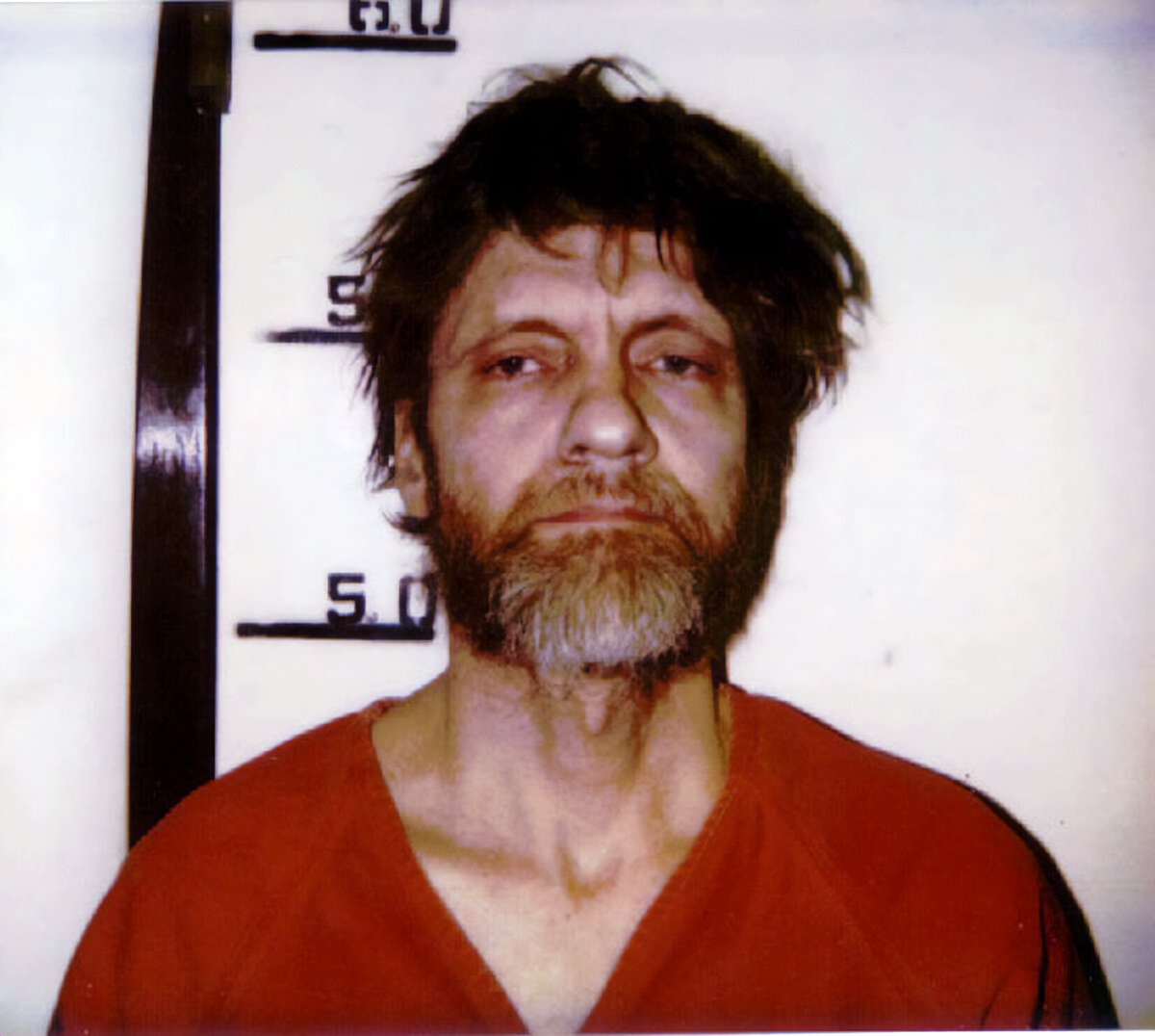
The American Ted Kaczynski, who was the first to be given the nickname Unabomber.

The name Unabomber is borrowed from that of a US terrorist, Theodore Kaczynski, the perpetrator of various bomb attacks over the course of eighteen years. Before his capture, he was identified by the FBI with the initials UNABOM (UNiversity and Airline BOMber), which was then deformed by the media. However, the similarities between the Italian and the US Unabomber are tenuous at best.

In 2005, the director of the Gazzettino of Venice, Luigi Bacialli, decided to change the name to the assonant and derogatory one of Monabomber, which exploited the vulgar Venetian expression mona, which refers to the female genitalia and is used colloquially to indicate a stupid person. The choice marked the distance from the original Unabomber and intended to discredit the unknown, or at least avoid his gratification: in this sense it was shared by authoritative signatures, but was rejected by others who recognised it as a violation of the laws of journalism in Italy, which require separating facts from opinions.

The new name was also met with the dissatisfaction of the Gazzettino journalists, considering the name to be a satirisation of the attacks, these people refused to reproduce it in the body of their articles, so that the name Monabomber was limited to the title. Even the Veneto journalists union and the FNSI distanced themselves from the Bacialli initiative. The change at the top in the editorial board of the Gazzettino finally returned the name back to Unabomber.

=== Activities ===
The Italian Unabomber struck regularly, but was not considered a serial killer, as his actions were aimed not at killing but at hurting, even if they sometimes bordered on fatal outcome. Nor should he be considered a terrorist, since he acted in accordance to an obscure motive, without claiming responsibility for his criminal acts and their meaning. Some investigators believe it is possible to challenge him with the aggravating circumstance of asking him the purpose of his serial killing. However, a motive has never officially been established. The state has granted compensation to some of the victims of Unabomber, as is generally the case for victims of serial killers. The first seriously injured woman, Anna Pignat, however, died in 2008 without having received compensation. Instead, it was obtained by Anita Buosi (90,466 euros), Nadia Ros (38,418) and the two nine and six-year-old girls injured in 2003 and 2005 (190,455 and 53,786 respectively)

Unabomber is wanted for a series of personal injury events of varying severity and for attempted murder.

=== Criminological profile ===
One element that distinguishes the Italian Unabomber is the impossibility of creating a precise operational scheme of their attacks. Some peculiarities can only be noted, such as the fact that the most affected localities were Pordenone and Portogruaro. It can also be assumed that it targets small towns rather than cities to terrorize the population more effectively. Among the common features of the attacks, the tendency to carry them out on holidays or during the summer season, in crowded places relevant to the occasion (churches on religious holidays, beaches during summer, squares during carnivals), stands out. The fact that he did not commit any crimes between 1997 and 1999 has led some to hypothesize an impediment (prison time for an unrelated crime, military experience, etc...). In addition, he seems to know the territory well, so he could be from western Friuli, if not really just from Pordenone.

Attempts at profiling have come back with the description of a person aged between 35 and 50, given the prolonged time of activity and the knowledge demonstrated in his traps. The way his explosive devices were prepared reveals not only excellent dexterity and skill in chemistry and engineering, but also obsessive attention to detail. Considering the time needed to prepare such devices, it is likely that he lives alone and/or in an isolated area. It is not excluded that he may have observed some of the explosions from afar, but in his modus operandi there was no tendency towards exhibitionism or the intention to leave a signature.

There are many hypotheses on the motives, based on the fact that most of the victims were hit on the occasion of Catholic holidays or in places of collective gathering. The preferred victims do not belong to recurring social categories, against which there could be a fury caused by contempt, but the victims are ordinary people or even children. According to some psychologists he could suffer from a trauma or an impairment, which would push him to lash out and strike at somebody without aiming at any specific target.

=== Current situation ===
The last attack carried out by the Italian Unabomber dates back to 6 May 2006. A long period of silence is still ongoing today, which lends itself to various interpretations. Possible explanations include that the bomber may have died, or may have been arrested for another crime and not identified, lost interest in striking, or is simply on a long hiatus. However, there are those who formulate more refined hypotheses, arguing that he may be in psychotherapy or even in drug therapy. Some investigators, such as Domenico Labozzetta, declare a substantial lack of trying, due to the fact that the investigations have never really come close to the person responsible for the attacks. Some investigators, however, believe that the Unabomber case is far from closed, arguing that local police forces need to periodically review the case.

== Timeline ==
=== 1994 ===
- 21 August 1994
  - The first attack attributed to the bomber occurred during a bird parade attended by 50,000 in Sacile (near Pordenone). Four people sustained minor cuts from debris scattered by the crude bomb planted on the ground.
- 17 December 1994
  - A pipe bomb was found in front of a Standa shop in the town of Pordenone.
- 18 December 1994
  - A bomb was discovered inside a church in Aviano (near Pordenone).

=== 1995 ===
- 5 March 1995
  - Two distinct pipe bomb explosions were observed in the downtown area of Azzano Decimo.
- 30 September 1995
  - In the first attack resulting in a serious injury, an elderly woman activated a booby trap, resulting in an amputated arm.
- 11 December 1995
  - Bomb explodes in Aquileia.
- 24 December 1995
  - Bomb explodes in Latisana.
- 26 December 1995
  - Bomb explodes in Bibione.

=== 1996 ===
- 2 April 1996
  - Bomb explodes in Claut.
- 22 April 1996
  - Bomb explodes in Bannia di Fiume Veneto.
- 4 August 1996
  - Bomb explodes under a beach parasol in Lignano Sabbiadoro, injuring a holidaymaker.

=== 2000 ===
- 6 July 2000
  - A pipe bomb explodes at a beach in Lignano Sabbiadoro, injuring a former police officer.
- 13 September 2000
  - A bomb explodes in San Stino di Livenza.
- 31 October 2000
  - A bomb placed inside an egg at the supermarket 'Continente' in Portogruaro is discovered and defused by bomb disposal technicians.
- 1 November 2000
  - A bomb explodes in San Stino di Livenza.

=== 2001 ===
- 2 November 2001
  - A 63-year-old woman was injured when a votive candle in a cemetery explodes in Motta di Livenza.
- 6 November 2001
  - A bomb explodes after it is placed inside a tube of tomato sauce, on sale at the 'Continente' supermarket in Portogruaro, seriously injuring a woman in the left hand.
- 17 November 2001
  - A bomb is discovered inside a mayonnaise sauce tube by an alarmed customer and safely defused by bomb disposal technicians in Portogruaro.

=== 2002 ===
- 23 July 2002
  - A bomb is discovered in the supermarket 'Iperstanda' inside a Nutella jar and safely defused by bomb disposal technicians in Porcia.
- 2 September 2002
  - A child was injured when opening a bottle of soap-bubble solution in Pordenone.
- November 2002
  - A woman at Cordignano lost a thumb and two fingers while handling a booby-trapped tube of tomato paste in her kitchen.
  - An unnamed woman from near Venice discovered an unusually heavy and hard tube of mayonnaise she had bought in a supermarket. Police discovered a primitive explosive device within the tube.
  - A man reported to police that an egg he had bought at a local market had been tampered with. No injuries. Police found a hair and traces of saliva in adhesive tape on the egg box and extracted a DNA sample.
- 25 December 2002
  - A bomb explodes outside the Duomo in Cordenons.

=== 2003 ===
- 24 March 2003
  - A bomb explodes when placed inside a flush toilet at the Justice building in Pordenone.
- 25 April 2003
  - Two girls in San Biagio di Callalta were injured when they handled a booby-trapped marking pen. One nine-year-old lost three fingers and suffered injuries to her eye.

=== 2004 ===
- 2 April 2004
  - A bomb is discovered inside a church in Portogruaro and safely defused by bomb disposal technicians.

=== 2005 ===
- 26 January 2005
  - A Kinder egg placed in the street in Treviso exploded after being kicked by passing schoolchildren. Such eggs usually contain a toy or prize. None of the children were harmed. The attack took place near the Treviso court house, and so may have been designed to taunt investigators there.
- 13 March 2005
  - Three children were injured when one attempted to light an electrical votive candle during Mass at the church in Motta di Livenza. The girl inserted coins and turned a handle to operate the candle when a small bomb exploded, injuring her left hand and two bystanders.
- 16 March 2005
  - One Italian Unabomber-style bomb was found in a small fish box in a humanitarian supply box sent to Romania from the village of Concordia Sagittaria. The bomb did not explode due to a low battery charge.
- 9 July 2005
  - An unexploded bomb was found under the seat of a female's pushbike in Portogruaro, which had been left for several days in front of a train station. The bomb probably did not explode due to an electrical malfunction in the bomb's battery, caused by intense rain in the preceding days.

=== 2006 ===
- 6 May 2006
  - Massimiliano Bozzo, a 28-year-old nurse from Mestre, walking with his girlfriend near the mouth of the river Livenza, found a bottle apparently containing a message. The bottle also contained an explosive device which exploded damaging his left hand, with consequent loss of his thumb.

=== 2009 ===
- January
  - Italian Unabomber suspect Elvo Zornitta is acquitted.
