= Diogenes Angelakos =

American electrical engineer (1919–1997)

- Born: Diogenes James Angelakos; July 3, 1919; Chicago, Illinois, U.S.
- Died: June 7, 1997 (aged 77); Berkeley, California, U.S.
- Education: University of Notre Dame; Harvard University
- Known for: Pioneering the fields of microwaves, antennas and electromagnetic waves and being injured by one of Ted Kaczynski's bombs in 1982
- Spouse: Helen Hatzilambrou (m. 1946; died 1982)
- Children: 2
- Scientific career
- Fields: Electronic engineering
- Workplaces: University of California, Berkeley
- Thesis: Current and charge distributions on antennas and open-wire lines (1950)
- Doctoral advisor: Ronold W. P. King

Diogenes James Angelakos (July 3, 1919 – June 7, 1997) was an American electrical engineer and professor emeritus of electronic engineering at the University of California, Berkeley, who served as the director of the Electronics Research Laboratory for 20 years. He is credited with building up the research group into one of the university's biggest research labs. He is considered a pioneer in the fields of microwaves, antennas and electromagnetic waves.

== Engineering career ==
He graduated from University of Notre Dame with a B.S. in electrical engineering in 1942 and then received his M.S. (1946) and Ph.D. (1950) in the same field from Harvard University. In 1964, he was appointed director of the Electronics Research Laboratory at the University of California, Berkeley.

He was a Fellow, and later a Life Fellow, of the Institute of Electrical and Electronics Engineers and an honorary member of the Hellenic Physical Society. Among his awards were the "Greek Independence Medal for Technical Assistance to Greek Science", the "Axion Award of the Hellenic-American Professional Society of California" and an award from the Directors of the Joint Services Electronic Program of the United States Department of Defense. He was also recipient of the Berkeley Citation, the University of California, Berkeley's highest award.

== Unabomber victim ==
On July 2, 1982, Angelakos was the victim of a pipe bomb left by Ted Kaczynski, the "Unabomber", at an electrical engineering and computer science faculty lounge in Cory Hall. He was injured in the face and right hand, but recovered nearly completely. After surgery he was able to re-learn how to write, but the powder burns left by the bomb were permanent. Fourteen years on, he expressed bafflement at the bomber's motives, saying that "If someone has a message to give to the world, you can't get it across by killing people. I just don't understand him at all. He must have some mental problems."

Three years later, he was among the first people on the scene and administered first aid when another of Kaczynski's bombs exploded and injured Berkeley graduate student John E. Hauser, a U.S. Air Force captain. Angelakos used his necktie as a tourniquet to stem the bleeding in Hauser's arm.

== Personal life ==
Angelakos was born in Chicago of Greek immigrant parents. He and his wife Helen Hatzilambrou were married for 36 years until her death on August 1, 1982. They had two children. He died of prostate cancer at his home in Berkeley in 1997. He was an adherent of the Greek Orthodox Church.
