= P.O. Box Unabomber =

Play by Gergana Dimitrova

- Author: Zdrava Kamenova, Gergana Dimitrova
- Language: Bulgarian
- Genre: contemporary drama
- Published: 2011
- Publication place: Bulgaria
- Followed by: Cinderellas Ltd.

P.O. Box Unabomber (alternative title Praehidno) is a Bulgarian theatre play written by Zdrava Kamenova and Gergana Dimitrova. The play won "Ikar" award of the Union of Bulgarian Artists in 2012 for Best Bulgarian play of the year.

P.O. Box Unabomber integrates quotations from Kaczynski's manifesto.

== See also ==
- Industrial Society and Its Future – Kaczynski's manifesto
