= Anti-Tech Revolution (revolutionary movement) =

Anti-Tech Organization

- Founded: 2022
- Purpose: Anti-Tech Revolution
- Location: Europe
- Website: antitechrevolution.org

Anti-Tech Revolution (ATR), formerly known as Anti-Tech Resistance, is a radical anti-tech movement that views the technological system as incompatible with wild nature, human nature, and freedom. The movement calls for the destruction of the technological system and then a re-adoption of pre-industrial technology. ATR states they are an above-ground movement and are only known to have engaged in legal forms of activism.

ATR was founded in France in 2022. Most of the membership is based in Europe, and most of their actions are as well.

In 2026 the movement's name changed to Anti-Tech Revolution due to a re-organization. They appeared under this name during their disruption of a conference held by the mayor of Paris and were cited by Mauro Lubrano with this name in a recent article on the rise of political and radical anti-technology movements.

ATR maintains a non-partisan position that some have claimed is intended to blur ATR’s real intentions. ATR has defended this approach as necessary to focus only on destroying the technological system.

== Actions ==
The group is known to have partaken in disruptive action inside France.

Starting May 2024, ATR organized workshops to raise awareness about the social and environmental dangers of AI in Rennes city center, alongside the local anti-industrial assembly ("Assemblée Anti-Industrielle de Rennes - AGIR).

In September 2024, they disrupted conferences taking place during the "AI Week" in Rennes with the anti-industrial assembly. This week was organized between universities, scientists and industrials to promote the carrier opportunities of AI and develop research around military use of AI in Rennes.

In November 2024, Anti-Tech Revolution supported the anti-industrial assembly of Rennes who blocated the university against the European Cyberweek.

As part of their campaign against artificial intelligence, ATR disrupted the AI Village at the CFIA (Agri-Food Industry Suppliers' Forum) in Rennes. They spoke out to denounce the growing impact of artificial intelligence on agriculture and its consequences for farmers.

In February 2025, they disrupted an AI counter-summit that had been organized by Éric Sadin. They criticized the AI Action Summit for aiding in the development of the technological system and the AI counter-summit because of a controversial decision to invite the mayor of Paris, Anne Hidalgo, whom ATR accused of actually being a pro-AI technocrat. Following this, she canceled her talk at the AI counter-summit.

In April 2025, Anti-Tech Revolution disrupted a talk by Cyril Dion (an prominent figure in the French environmental movement) at the ChangeNow summit. They denounced the greenwashing of the event -which was funded by major industrial players- and accused Cyril Dion of failing to condemn modern technologies despite claiming to be an environmentalist.

In September 2025, ATR took part in the Bloquons Tout ( English: “Block everything”) movement.

== Criticism ==
ATR has been criticized in France by left-leaning political and environmental groups, as well as communist and some anarchist groups, for allegedly being reactionary and essentialist. Anti-fascist groups have also criticized the movement, accusing ATR of lacking an intersectional approach, which they claim a movement must have.
