= Industrial Society and Its Future =

1995 manifesto by Ted Kaczynski

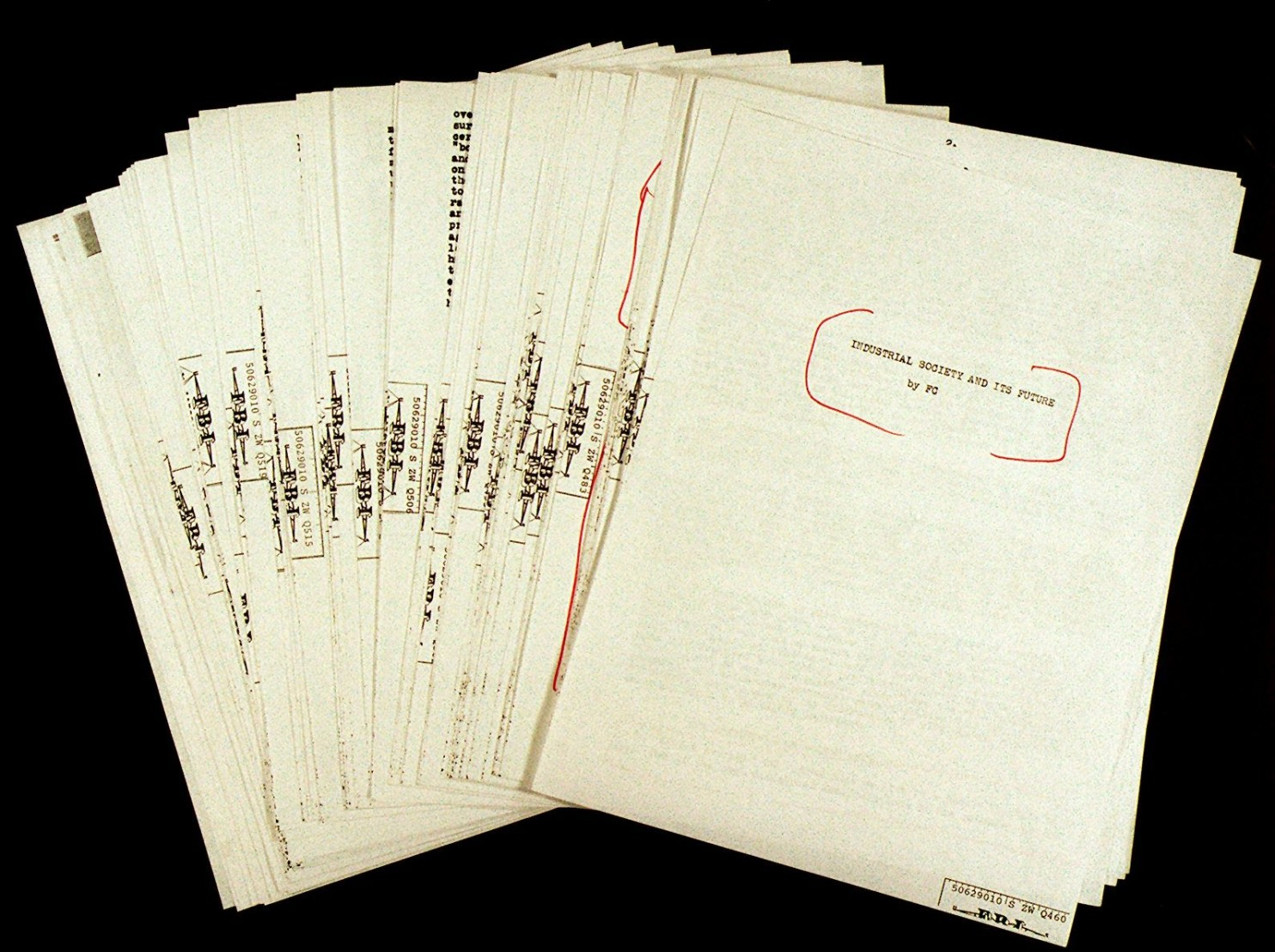
Kaczynski's typescript sent to The Washington Post

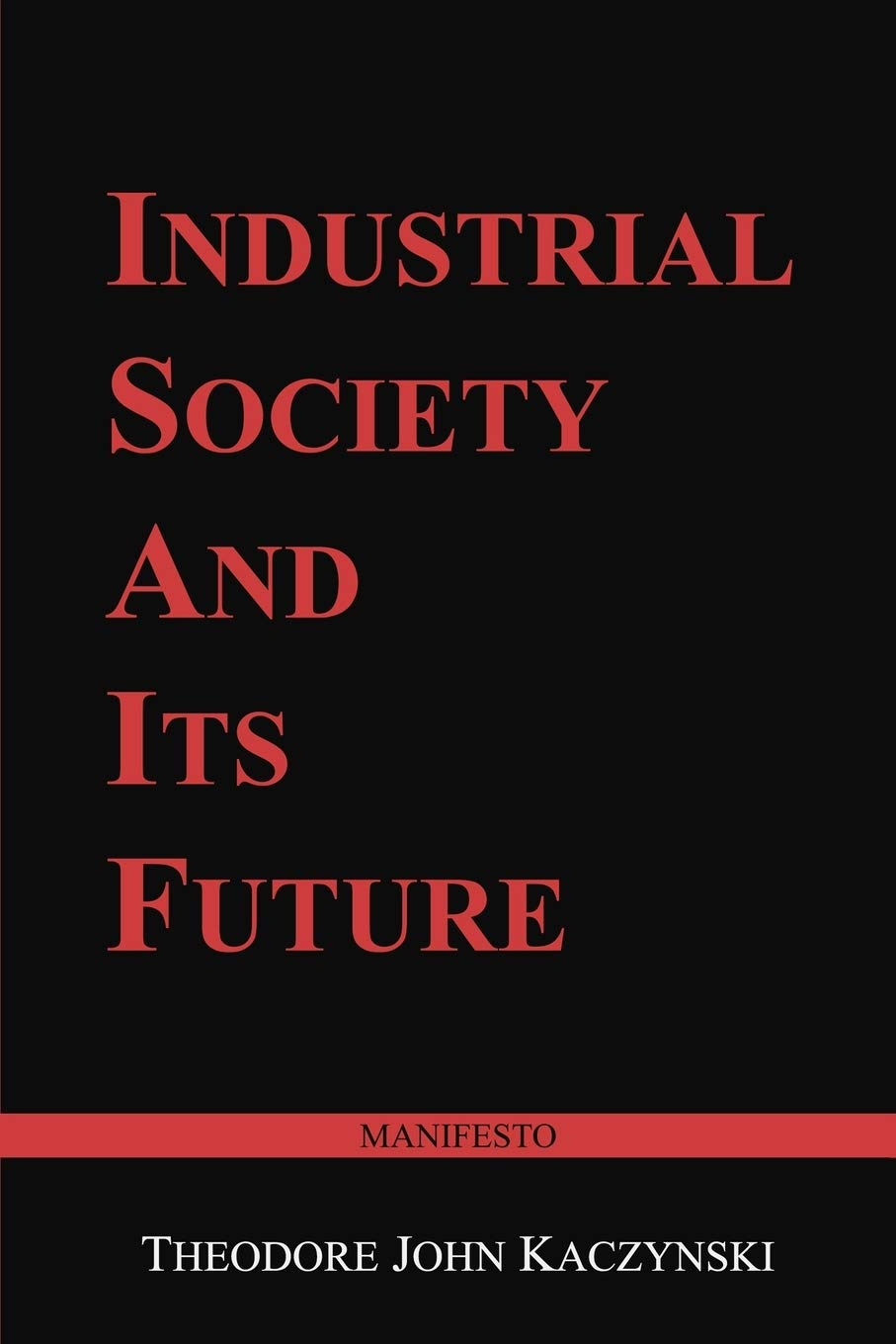
Print edition cover

Industrial Society and Its Future, also known as the Unabomber Manifesto, is a 1995 essay by the domestic terrorist and mathematician Ted Kaczynski. It argues that the Industrial Revolution began a harmful process of natural destruction brought about by technology. Furthermore, it states that forcing humans to adapt to machinery creates a sociopolitical order that suppresses human potential and freedom.

The roughly 35,000-word manifesto formed the ideological foundation of Kaczynski's 1978–1995 mail bomb campaign, designed to protect wilderness by hastening the collapse of industrial society. The manifesto states that the public largely accepts individual technological advancements as purely positive without accounting for their overall effect, including the erosion of local and individual freedom and autonomy.

It was printed in September 1995 in a special supplement to The Washington Post after Kaczynski offered to suspend his bombing campaign if his manifesto was widely circulated. Attorney General Janet Reno authorized the printing to help the FBI identify the author. The printing of, and publicity around, the manifesto eclipsed the bombings in notoriety and led to the identification of the Unabomber by Ted's brother David Kaczynski and his wife.

== Impact ==
While Kaczynski's actions were generally condemned, his manifesto expressed ideas that continue to be generally shared among the American public. A 2017 Rolling Stone article stated that Kaczynski was an early adopter of the concept that:

We give up a piece of ourselves whenever we adjust to conform to society's standards. That, and we're too plugged in. We're letting technology take over our lives, willingly.

The Labadie Collection of the University of Michigan houses a copy of Industrial Society and its Future. The essay has been translated into French, remains on college reading lists, and was updated in Kaczynski's 2019 book, Technological Slavery, Volume One, which defends his political philosophy in greater depth.

== Background and publication ==
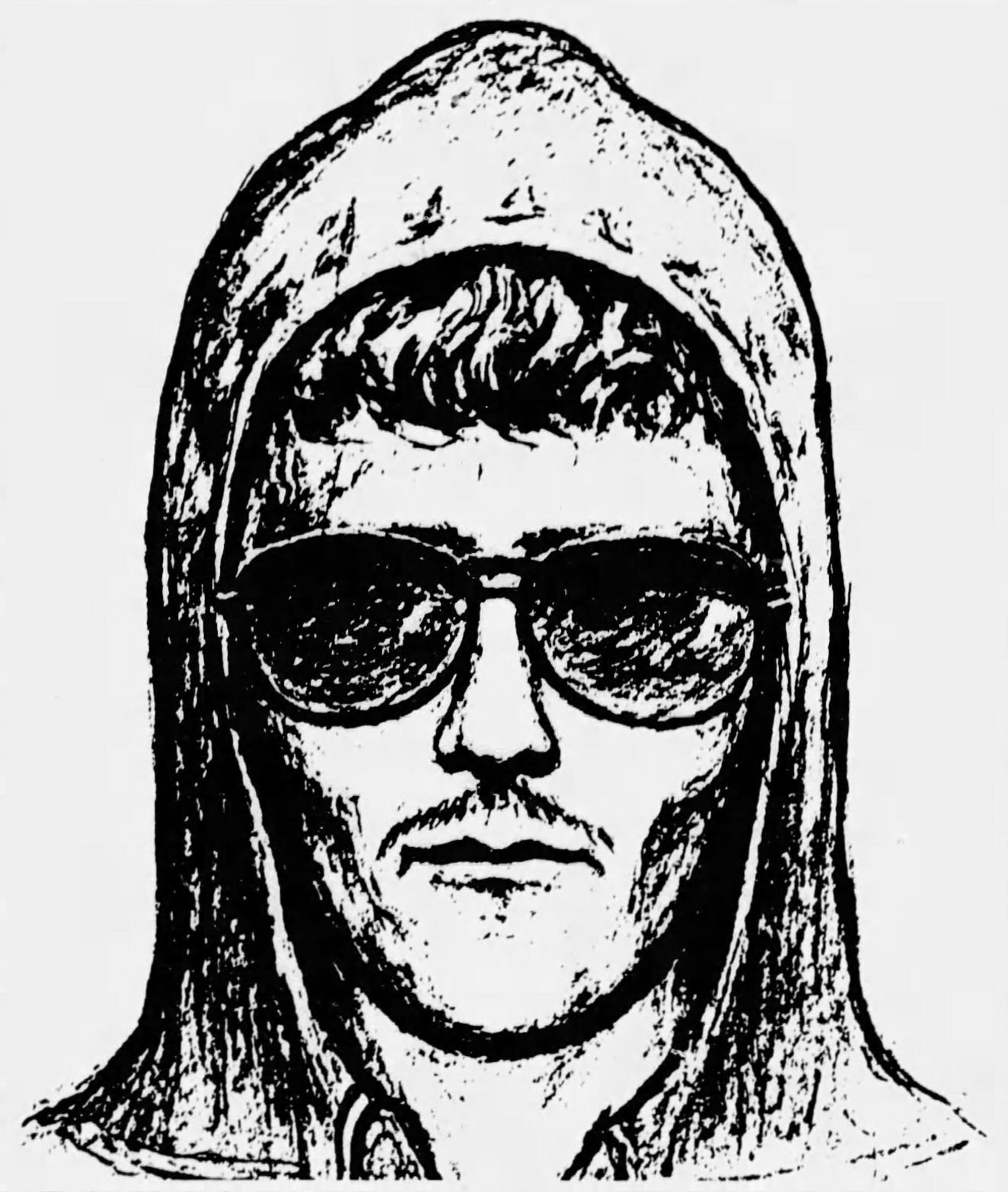
A 1987 suspect sketch of the Unabomber following the Salt Lake City bombing that injured Gary Wright; the sketch was superseded by a more iconic sketch by Jeanne Boylan in 1994, but it was the first to show him in his infamous hooded sweatshirt and sunglasses.

Between 1978 and 1995, Ted Kaczynski engaged in a mail bomb campaign against people involved with modern technology. His initial targets were universities and airlines, which the FBI shortened as UNABOM. In June 1995, Kaczynski offered to end his campaign if one of several publications—The Washington Post, The New York Times, or Penthouse (Note: with the additional stipulation that he reserved the right to plant one more bomb intended to kill)—would publish his critique of technology, titled Industrial Society and Its Future, which became widely known as the "Unabomber Manifesto".

Kaczynski believed that his violence, as direct action when words were insufficient, would draw others to pay attention to his critique. He wanted his ideas to be taken seriously. The media debated the ethics of publishing the manifesto under duress. The United States Attorney General Janet Reno advocated for the essay to be shared so that a reader could potentially recognize its author.

During that summer, the FBI worked with literature scholars to compare the Unabomber's text against the works of Joseph Conrad, including The Secret Agent, based on their shared themes.

The Washington Post published the manifesto in full within a supplement on September 19, 1995, splitting the cost with The New York Times. According to a statement, the Post had the "mechanical ability to distribute a separate section in all copies of its daily newspaper." A Berkeley-based chess book publisher began publishing copies in paperback the next month, without Kaczynski's consent.

Kaczynski wrote an essay in 1971 which contained many themes and ideas that would eventually appear in the manifesto, indicating that his particular line of anti-technological thought dated back relatively early in his life prior to his arrest. The original, handwritten manifesto sold for $20,053 in a 2011 auction of Kaczynski's assets, along with typewritten editions and their typewriters, to raise restitution for his victims.

== Contents ==
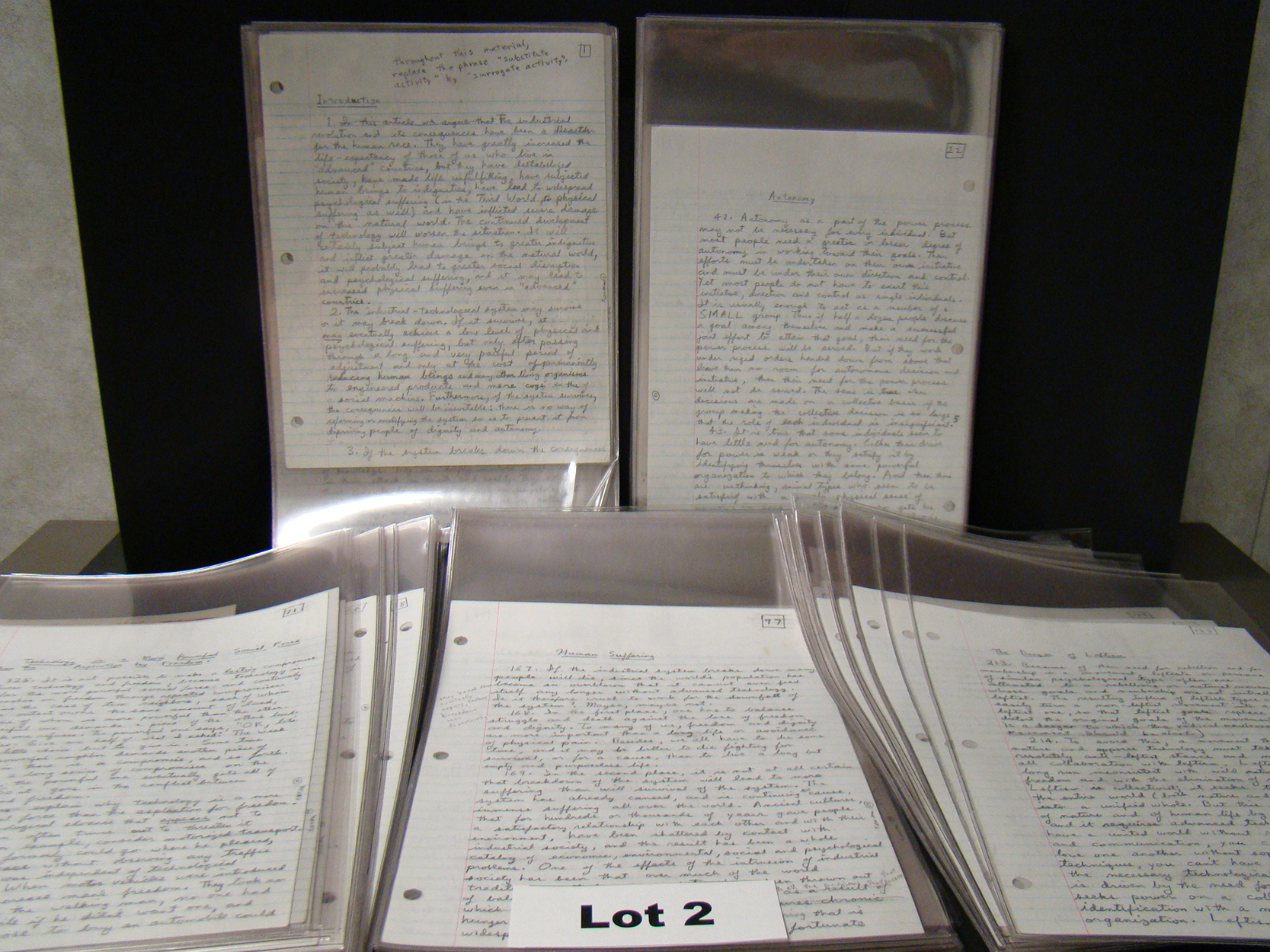
Handwritten draft of the manifesto

At 35,000 words, Industrial Society and Its Future lays very detailed blame on technology in and of itself for eroding individual freedom and autonomy, destroying human-scale communities, and leading to widespread psychological and physical suffering. Kaczynski contends that the Industrial Revolution harmed the human race by developing into a sociopolitical order that subjugates human needs beneath its own. This system, he wrote, destroys nature and suppresses individual freedom. In short, humans adapt to machines rather than vice versa, resulting in a society hostile to human potential, freedom, and dignity.

Kaczynski indicts technological progress for its destruction of small human communities and the rise of inhospitable cities. He contends that this relentless technological progress will not dissipate on its own, because individual technological advancements are seen as good despite the sum effects of this progress, and technological growth is beyond rational human control (i.e., autonomous). Kaczynski describes modern technological society as totalitarian force—an order in which individuals are "adjusted" to fit the requirements of the system and those outside the system are seen as pathological or "bad".

This tendency, he says, gives rise to expansive police powers, mind-numbing mass media, and indiscriminate promotion of drugs, designed to conform to the needs of the technological environment. He criticizes both big government and big business as the inevitable result of industrialization, and holds scientists and "technophiles" responsible for recklessly pursuing power through technological advancements.

He argues that this industrialized system's collapse will be devastating in the short-term, although quickening the collapse—before technology progresses further—will prevent unmitigated catastrophe for humanity and the biosphere in the future. He justifies the trade-offs that come with losing industrial society as being worth the cost. Kaczynski's ideal revolution seeks not to overthrow governments if unnecessary, but rather, the economic and technological foundation of modern society. He seeks to destroy existing society and protect the wilderness, the antithesis of technology.

=== Influences ===
Industrial Society and Its Future echoes contemporary critics of technology and industrialization such as John Zerzan, Jacques Ellul, Rachel Carson, Lewis Mumford, and E. F. Schumacher. Its idea of the "disruption of the power process" similarly echoed social critics who emphasize that the lack of meaningful work is a primary cause of social problems, including Mumford, Paul Goodman, and Eric Hoffer. Aldous Huxley addressed its general theme in Brave New World, to which Kaczynski refers in his text. Kaczynski's ideas of "oversocialization" and "surrogate activities" recall Sigmund Freud's Civilization and Its Discontents and its theories of rationalization and sublimation (a term which Kaczynski uses three times to describe "surrogate activities").

However, a 2021 study by Sean Fleming shows that many of these similarities are coincidental. Kaczynski had not read Lewis Mumford, Paul Goodman, or John Zerzan until after he submitted Industrial Society and Its Future to The New York Times and The Washington Post. There is no evidence that he read Freud, Carson, or Schumacher. Instead, Fleming argues, Industrial Society and Its Future "is a synthesis of ideas from [...] French philosopher Jacques Ellul, British zoologist Desmond Morris, and American psychologist Martin Seligman."

Kaczynski's understanding of technology, his idea of maladaptation, and his critique of leftism are partly derived from Ellul's 1954 book, The Technological Society. Kaczynski's concept of "surrogate activities" echoes Desmond Morris's concept of "survival-substitute activities", while his concept of "the power process" combines Morris's concept of "the Stimulus Struggle" with Seligman's concept of learned helplessness. Fleming's study relies on archival material from the Labadie Collection at the University of Michigan, including a "secret" set of footnotes that Kaczynski did not include in the Washington Post version of Industrial Society and Its Future.

The scholar George Michael of Vanderbilt University Press accused Kaczynski of "collecting philosophical and environmental clichés to reinforce common American concerns".

== Aftermath ==
Kaczynski three years before he began to draft an essay of the ideas that would become the manifesto (UC Berkeley, 1968)

Kaczynski had intended for his mail bombing campaign to raise awareness for the message in Industrial Society and Its Future, which he wanted to be seriously regarded.

With its initial publication in 1995, the manifesto was received as intellectually deep and sane. Writers described the manifesto's sentiment as familiar. To Kirkpatrick Sale, the Unabomber was "a rational man" with reasonable beliefs about technology. He recommended the manifesto's opening sentence for the forefront of American politics. Cynthia Ozick likened the work to an American Raskolnikov (of Dostoevsky's Crime and Punishment), as a "philosophical criminal of exceptional intelligence and humanitarian purpose ... driven to commit murder out of an uncompromising idealism". Numerous websites engaging with the manifesto's message appeared online.

Kaczynski's effort to publish his manifesto brought him into the American news more than the bombings themselves. The manifesto was widely spread via newspapers, book reprints, and the Internet. Ultimately, the ideas in the manifesto were eclipsed by reaction to the violence of the bombings, and did not spark the serious public consideration he was looking for.

Linda Patrik, the wife of Ted's brother David Kaczynski, suspected Ted had written the manifesto because she recognized his linguistic mannerisms, and she told her husband about her suspicions. At first, he disbelieved that his own brother could be the author of the manifesto, but upon comparing the previous letters that they shared, he found evidence: one of Ted's mannerisms was found in one of the letters that they exchanged, just as it was written in the manifesto. Upon this discovery, David notified the FBI.

Later, a judge granted the FBI a search warrant to Kaczynski's Montana cabin on the basis of linguistic evidence. FBI agents identified a number of correlations between the manifesto and Kaczynski's letters to his brother and mother, including an idiosyncratic use of the idiom "You can't eat your cake and have it, too", an apparent reversal of the more common phrase.

=== Effect of the trial ===
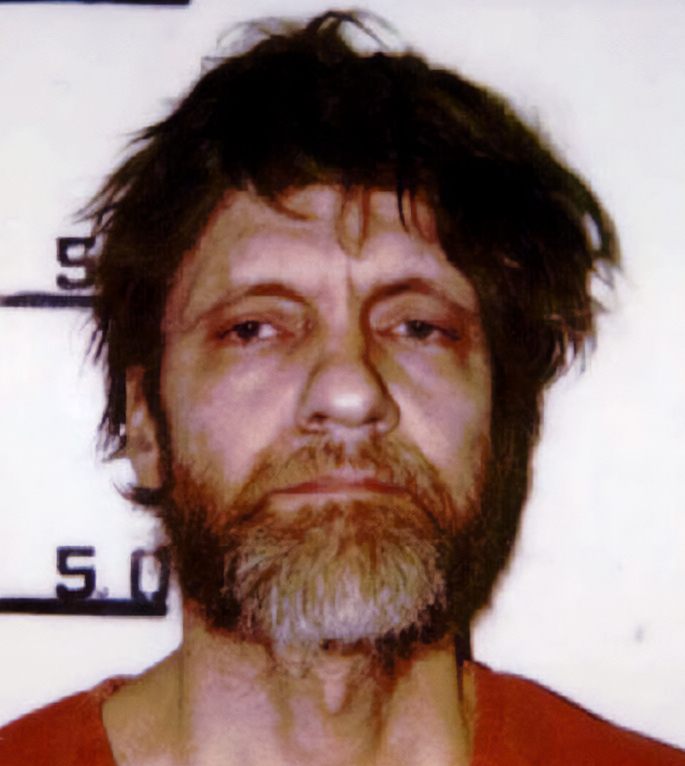
Kaczynski's mugshot (1996)

After Ted Kaczynski's April 1996 arrest, he wanted to use the trial to disseminate his views, but the judge denied him permission to represent himself. Instead, his court-appointed lawyers planned an insanity defense that would discredit Industrial Society and Its Future against his will. The prosecution's psychiatrists counter-cited the manifesto as evidence of the Unabomber's lucidity, and Kaczynski's sanity was tried in court and in the media. Kaczynski responded by taking a plea bargain for life imprisonment without parole in May 1998.

Kaczynski's biographer Alston Chase argued that the public should look beyond this "genius-or-madman debate", and view the manifesto as reflecting normal, common, unexceptional ideas shared by Americans, sharing their distrust over the direction of civilization. While most Americans abhorred his violence, adherents to his anti-technology message have celebrated his call to question technology and preserve wilderness. From his Colorado maximum security prison, he continued to clarify his philosophy with other writers through correspondence, and by composing two books which were published during his incarceration, until his death in 2023.

== Legacy ==
Part of Kaczynski's manifesto was cited by the inventor and author Raymond Kurzweil in his book The Age of Spiritual Machines (1999), and then mentioned in the article "Why the Future Doesn't Need Us" (2000) by computer scientist Bill Joy.

As of 2000, Industrial Society and Its Future remained on college reading lists and the green anarchist and eco-extremist movements came to hold Kaczynski's writing in high regard, with the manifesto finding a niche audience among critics of technology, such as the speculative science fiction and anarcho-primitivist communities. It has since been translated into many other languages, including French by Jean-Marie Apostolidès.

Since 2000, the Labadie Collection houses a copy of the manifesto, along with Ted Kaczynski's other writings, letters and papers, after he officially designated the University of Michigan to receive them. They have since become one of the most popular archives in their special collections.

In 2017, an article in Rolling Stone stated that Kaczynski was an early adopter of the idea that:

We give up a piece of ourselves whenever we adjust to conform to society's standards. That, and we're too plugged in. We're letting technology take over our lives, willingly.

In 2018, New York magazine stated that the manifesto generated later interest from environmentalists, and anarcho-primitivists.

In December 2020, a man who was arrested at Charleston International Airport on a charge of "conveying false information regarding attempted use of a destructive device" after he falsely threatened that he had a bomb, was found to have been carrying the Unabomber manifesto.

Although Kaczynski himself described fascism as "evil", the manifesto is popular among Ecofascists. According to Professor Michael Loadenthal there has been “Siege-ification of the deep green” and Industrial Society and Its Future is widely shared in the Terrorgram community.

The suspect in the killing of Brian Thompson, Luigi Mangione, was suspected by the police to have been inspired by the manifesto. Mangione had posted a Goodreads review of the manifesto, giving four stars out of five, however also describing Kaczynski as "rightfully imprisoned" and criticizing his use of violence against innocent individuals.

In 2022, the radical ecologist movement Anti-Tech Revolution was founded in Europe inspired by Industrial Society and its Future and Kaczynski's last book, Anti-Tech-Revolution: Why and How?. The movement aims to return to pre-industrial technologies and is mainly active in Europe, though it has a growing reputation around the globe.

=== Reprints and further work ===
Feral House republished the manifesto in Kaczynski's first book, the 2010 Technological Slavery, alongside correspondence and an interview. Kaczynski was unsatisfied with the book and his lack of control in its publication. Kaczynski's 2008 book Technological Slavery, Volume One. Revised and Expanded Edition updates his 1995 manifesto with more relevant references and defends his political philosophy in greater depth. In February 2021, Kaczynski wrote a new preface to his original 1995 manifesto.

== See also ==
- Accelerationism
- Anarchism and violence
- Anarcho-communism
- Anarcho-primitivism
- Anti-Tech Revolution (2016)
- Criticism of technology
- Declinism
- Ecofascism
- Eco-terrorism
- Green anarchism
- The Limits to Growth (1972)
- Man and Technics (1931)
- Industrial Revolution
- Neo-Luddism
- Propaganda of the deed
- Radical environmentalism
- Technological Determinism
- The Question Concerning Technology (1954)
- The Technological Society (1954/1964)
- Philosophy of technology
- Propaganda: The Formation of Men's Attitudes
- Will we continue scientific research ? (1972)

== Bibliography ==
- Chase, Alston (June 2000). "Harvard and the Making of the Unabomber". The Atlantic. ISSN 1072-7825. Archived from the original on August 21, 2014.
- Fleming, Sean (May 7, 2021). "The Unabomber and the origins of anti-tech radicalism". Journal of Political Ideologies. 27 (2): 207–225. doi:10.1080/13569317.2021.1921940.
- Kelman, David (2017). "Politics in a Small Room: Subterranean Babel in Piglia's El camino de Ida". The Yearbook of Comparative Literature. 63 (1): 179–201. doi:10.3138/ycl.63.005. ISSN 1947-2978. S2CID 220494877. Project MUSE 758028.
- Kovaleski, Serge F. (July 9, 1996). "1907 Conrad Novel May Have Inspired Unabomb Suspect". Washington Post. ISSN 0190-8286.
- McHugh, Paul (November 2003). "The making of a killer". First Things: A Monthly Journal of Religion and Public Life (137): 58+. ISSN 1047-5141. Gale A110263474.
- Michael, George (2012). "Ecoextremism and the Radical Animal Liberation Movement". Lone Wolf Terror and the Rise of Leaderless Resistance. Nashville: Vanderbilt University Press. pp. 61–78. ISBN 978-0-8265-1857-6.
- Moen, Ole Martin (February 2019). "The Unabomber's ethics". Bioethics. 33 (2): 223–229. doi:10.1111/bioe.12494. hdl:10852/76721. ISSN 0269-9702. PMID 30136739. S2CID 52070603. EBSCOhost 134360154.
- Richardson, John H. (December 11, 2018). "The Unlikely New Generation of Unabomber Acolytes". New York. Archived from the original on February 9, 2021.
- Simmons, Ryan (1999). "What is a Terrorist? Contemporary Authorship, the Unabomber, and Mao II". MFS Modern Fiction Studies. 45 (3): 675–695. doi:10.1353/mfs.1999.0056. ISSN 1080-658X. S2CID 162235453. Project MUSE 21412.
- Tan, Anna E.; Snow, David (2015). "Cultural Conflicts and Social Movements". In della Porta, Donatella; Diani, Mario (eds.). The Oxford Handbook of Social Movements. pp. 513–533. doi:10.1093/oxfordhb/9780199678402.013.5. ISBN 978-0199678402.
