= The Meaning of the City =

Book by Jacques Ellul

The Meaning of the City is a theological essay by Jacques Ellul which recounts the story of the city in the Bible and seeks to explain the city's biblical significance.

Ellul wrote the book in 1951; it was published in English translation in 1970, and then in French in 1975 as Sans feu ni lieu : Signification biblique de la Grande Ville.

== Synopsis ==
Where is the city's foundation? All mythologies speak of an original garden, returning to which is man's only desire. The city is the world of man: his creation (made in his image) and his pride because it reflects his culture and his civilization. It is also a place of absurdity, of chaos, and of man's power over Nature and man, a place of slavery par excellence. Ellul recounts, through the course of the Bible, the city's origins. God places man in a garden because this is his natural place, the place to which he is best adapted. But man wished to separate from God and determine his own destiny. All mythologies herald man's return to nature, a return to the original state. Inversely, the Bible anticipates a perfect city, the New Jerusalem. "This shows that, out of love, God revises his own plans, taking into account the history of men, including their maddest revolts." Thus, from Genesis to Revelation, Ellul brings to life the rhythm of the city and unmasks the illusions thence attached, navigating within the Christian dialectic between the fall of man and redemption in order to give meaning to the present situation of people, who depend on the big city for everything they do.

== Exegesis ==
Ellul gives an exegesis of the city in the Bible. This is not a formalist or structuralist exegesis, but a traditional exegesis, which is to say it seeks to present the text as it appears today and in its entirety. This means that the author, here, seeks within the Bible all passages which relate to the city, as the basis for a biblical definition of this place. If the author "hears" the more sophisticated meanings given by his contemporaries, he nevertheless considers that one "cannot honestly interpret a text outside its content and the meaning which it gives itself". He therefore refuses to divide the text into independent fragments, instead taking them in their entirety; he considers the text to be essentially dialectical, implying that its meaning arises within an ensemble of contradictory statements. So doing, Ellul does not seek to explain why the Bible says what it says on the subject of cities, but to show what it says.

== Critique of the city ==
It is within the framework of his critique of technique (see The Technological Society) that Ellul approaches the city. In effect, according to him, the city is the place where technique becomes system, preventing man from living in freedom. And according to Ellul, this freedom arises in work within proximity to God, and later in the perfect example of Jesus Christ. Thus, "if one follows Ellul, humanity's freedom of choice seems singularly limited: return to the path of the Christian God or accept the dissolution of humanity. Strictly speaking this conception of liberty is a negation of autonomy, is a heteronomy. Facing this dilemma to which Ellul condemns us, how can we raise a challenge, how can we find a truly autonomous liberty, which is to say find its true characteristics and true limits?". This remark, published in the Revue du MAUSS, critiques Ellul's theistic thrust, but also shows the extent to which man wants to live without God, considering that true liberty cannot exist in relation to a creator.

The city is precisely the place created by man. It is the affirmation of man taking his life into his own hands, independently of God; it is the expression of man's rebellion against God. God has placed man at the garden, a place adapted to him. But man refuses the life for which God has destined him, which is unsettled, and men have gathered and organized themselves in order to depend no longer on nature. This political project (see Ellul 1965, L'Illusion politique), the management of the metropolis, underlies the city: security, survival, commerce, collective living... But this city, created to strengthen human solidarity and protect man against natural aggressions, becomes the place to isolation and insecurity. "Divine or celestial, the city reflects with the space of European culture a religious ideal of 'collective life', on which converge all the major issues of future society. The eater of men and the producer of social regulations, of power conflicts and culture shocks." The history of cities is the history of religions cross and interlocking, and of the Christian experience of this relationship, principally in relation to the urban conquest through which religion expanded itself. Since the 1960s, thinkers have raised the question of the "Secular City", and the city has become a "theological issue". In any case, the urban project, which diverts man from God, will at the last be judged severely.

The city is also the location of spiritual conflict. It therefore bears a profound meaning, a spiritual mark, which is the sign of malediction, and the founder of the city is cursed among all. "It is through slavery that Israel is linked to the city." All the cities, within the Bible, are cursed, and "never a word of hope, never a word of pardon for the city, for it is a terrible manifestation of the brilliant morning star, which has debased humanity." This malediction explains all the difficulties, all the problems encountered in cities, and however much one may seek solutions (security, urbanism, isolation), man will never make the city anything but that which it is. Here, one can detect the influence of Ellul's good friend Bernard Charbonneau. "Ellul was constantly recognizing his debt to Charbonneau", said pastor and theologian Jean-Sébastien Ingrand, director of the Strausbourg Protestant Media Library. Together they published "Outline of a personalist manifesto", in which they denounced, among other things, the city as contrary to liberty. "The man of the city is rich in money but poor in space and time", they wrote. "The city is a place of inhumanity, especially the banlieue, a banal and homogeneous space, the exact opposite of the country. The city is a place of artifice, where nature is vanquished. But note: one must not romanticize nature, which is perfectly capable of defending itself alone. It is man who is fragile, and above all his liberty. Bernard Charbonneau with Le jardin de Babylone (1969) and Jacques Ellul with Jacques Ellul, Sans feu, ni lieu (1975), rediscovered this point.

The city has grown to the size foretold by Ellul and Charbonneau, who were witnessing the urbanization of the world, the universalization of technique, and the standardization of all civilizations. Indeed, in 2008, the world's urban population surpassed its rural population. Where Charbonneau applied the symbol of Babylon, Ellul focuses on Ninevah. The big city is a mass which cannot survive without sacrificing liberty. "This, then, is what separates the two men: against the catastrophism of Charbonneau, Ellul presents a Christian hope, which leads from the Garden of Eden to the New Jerusalem foretold in Revelation.".

== Contents ==
I. The Builders

1. Cain
2. Nimrod
3. Israel
4. Let Us Build

II. Thunder Over the City

1. The Curse
2. Soddom and Ninevah
3. But In These Cities

III. Long We Wait for the Coming of the Dawn

1. Temporal Election
2. Jerusalem

IV. Jesus Christ

1. The Fulfillment
2. Neither Hearth Nor Home
3. The Multitude
4. Jesus and Jerusalem

V. True Horizons

1. The History of the City
2. From Cain to Jerusalem
3. From Eden to Jerusalem

VI. Yahweh-Shammah

1. The New City
2. Symbolism

== Bibliography of related works ==
- Bruno Dumons et Bernard Hours, Ville et religion en Europe du XVIe au XXe siècle - La cité réenchantée, la pierre et l'écrit, 2010. (online)
- Jean-Pierre Jézéquel, Jacques Ellul ou l’impasse de la technique, Revue du Mauss, 2010. (online)
- Extrait résumé du chapitre « La Grande Ville » du livre de Frédéric Rognon, Jacques Ellul : Une pensée en dialogue, éd. Labor et Fides, 2007, p. 81-93. (online)
- Roger Cans, compte-rendu d’un colloque sur Bernard Charbonneau, précurseur de l’écologie, organisé du 2 au 4 mai 2011 à l’IRSAM (université de Pau). (online)
- Arnold Toynbee, Les Villes dans l'Histoire, cités en mouvement, Paris : Payot, 1972.
- Emrys Jones, La Ville et la Cité, Paris : Mercure de France, 1973.
- Alexander Mitscherlich, Psychanalyse et urbanisme : réponse aux planificateurs, Paris : Gallimard, 1970.
- Henri Lefebvre, Le Droit à la ville, Paris, Anthropos, 1968; La Révolution urbaine, Paris : Gallimard, 1970; La Pensée marxiste et la ville, Paris : Casterman, 1972.
- Harvey Cox, La Cité séculière. Essai théologique sur la sécularisation et l’urbanisation, Paris, Casterman, 1968.
- Joseph Comblin, Théologie de la ville, Paris, Éditions Universitaires, 1968.
