= Jacques Ellul =

French anarchist philosopher (1912–1994)

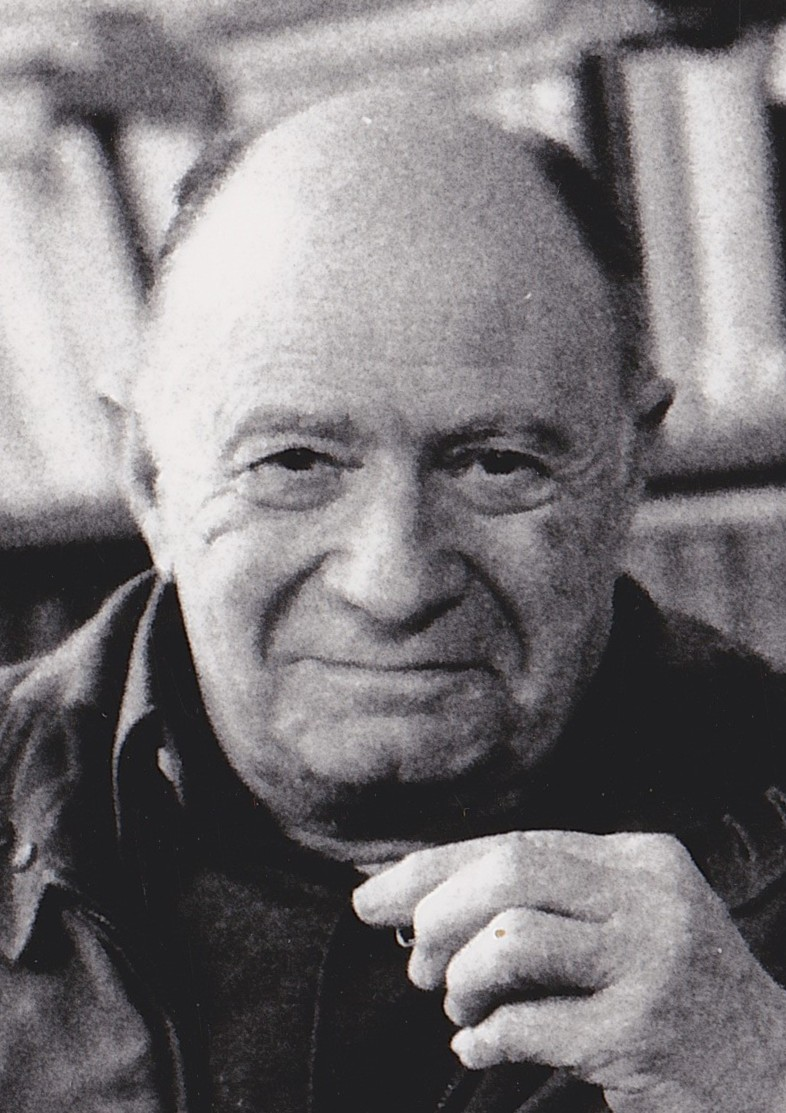
- Ellul in 1990
- Born: 6 January 1912; Bordeaux, France
- Died: 19 May 1994 (aged 82); Pessac, France

Education
- Education: University of Bordeaux; University of Paris

Philosophical work
- Era: 20th-century philosophy
- Region: Western philosophy
- School: Christian anarchism; Continental philosophy; Non-conformists of the 1930s
- Institutions: University of Bordeaux
- Notable ideas: Technological society

Jacques Ellul (/ɛˈluːl/; French: [ɛlyl]; 6 January 1912 – 19 May 1994) was a French-born philosopher, sociologist, lay theologian, resistance fighter and professor. Noted as a Christian anarchist, Ellul was a longtime professor of History and the Sociology of Institutions on the Faculty of Law and Economic Sciences at the University of Bordeaux. A prolific writer, he authored more than 60 books and more than 600 articles over his lifetime, many of which discussed propaganda, the impact of technology on society, and the interaction between religion and politics.

The dominant theme of Ellul's work proved to be the threat to human freedom and religion created by modern technology. He did not seek to eliminate modern technology or technique but sought to change our perception of them to that of a tool rather than regulator of the status quo. Among his most influential books are The Technological Society and Propaganda: The Formation of Men's Attitudes.

Considered by many to be a philosopher, Ellul was trained as a sociologist, and approached the question of technology and human action from a dialectical viewpoint. His writings are frequently concerned with the emergence of a technological tyranny over humanity. As a philosopher and theologian, he further explored the religiosity of the technological society. In 2000, the International Jacques Ellul Society was founded by a group of former Ellul students. The society, which includes scholars from a variety of disciplines, is devoted to continuing Ellul's legacy and discussing the contemporary relevance and implications of his work.

== Life and influences ==
Jacques Ellul was born in Bordeaux, France, on 6 January 1912, to Marthe Mendes (Protestant; French-Portuguese) and Joseph Ellul (initially an Eastern Orthodox Christian, but later a Voltairian deist by conviction; born in Malta to an Italo-Maltese father and Serbian mother). As a teenager he wanted to be a naval officer but his father made him study law. He married Yvette Lensvelt in 1937.

Ellul was educated at the universities of Bordeaux and Paris. In World War II, he was a leader in the French resistance. For his efforts to save Jews he was awarded the title Righteous among the Nations by Yad Vashem in 2001.

Ellul was best friends with Bernard Charbonneau, who was also a writer from the Aquitaine region and a protagonist of the French personalism movement. They met through the Protestant Student Federation during the academic school year of 1929–1930. Both men acknowledged the great influence each had on the other.

By the early 1930s, Ellul's three primary sources of inspiration were Karl Marx, Søren Kierkegaard, and Karl Barth. Ellul was first introduced to the ideas of Karl Marx during an economics lecture course taught by Joseph Benzacar in 1929–30; Ellul studied Marx and became a prolific exegete of his theories. During this same period, he also came across the Christian existentialism of Kierkegaard. According to Ellul, Marx and Kierkegaard were his two greatest influences, and the only two authors whose work he read in its entirety. Also, he considered Karl Barth, who was a leader of the resistance against the German state church in World War II, the greatest theologian of the 20th century. In addition to these intellectual influences, Ellul also said that his father played a great role in his life and considered him his role model.

In large measure, and especially in those of his books concerned with theological matters, Ellul restated the viewpoints held by Barth, whose polar dialectic of the Word of God, in which the Gospel both judges and renews the world, shaped Ellul's theological perspective. In Jacques Ellul: A Systemic Exposition Darrell J. Fasching claimed Ellul believed "That which desacralizes a given reality, itself in turn becomes the new sacred reality".

In 1932, after what he describes as "a very brutal and very sudden conversion", Ellul professed himself a Christian. Ellul believes he was about 17 (1929–30) and spending the summer with some friends in Blanquefort, France. While translating Faust alone in the house, Ellul suddenly believed (without seeing or hearing anything) he was in the presence of a something so overwhelming that it changed his point of view. He fled the house on a bike, concluding that he had been in the presence of God. This experience started the conversion process which Ellul said then continued over a period of years thereafter, eventually becoming a layman in the Reformed Church of France. Although Ellul identified as a Protestant, he was critical of church authority in general because he believed the church dogmas did not place enough emphasis on the teachings of Jesus or Christian scripture.

Ellul was also prominent in the worldwide ecumenical movement, although he later became sharply critical of the movement for what he felt were indiscriminate endorsements of political establishments. Ellul came to like Pierre-Joseph Proudhon, who convinced him that the creation of new institutions from the grass roots level was the best way to create an anarchist society. He stated his view is close to that of anarcho-syndicalism, however the kind of change Ellul wanted was an evolutionary approach by means of a "... Proudhonian socialism ... by transforming the press, the media, and the economic structures ... by means of a federative cooperative approach" that would lead to an Anarchist society based on federation and the Mutualist economics of Proudhon. In regards to Jesus and Anarchism he believed Jesus was not merely a socialist but anarchist and that "anarchism is the fullest and most serious form of socialism".

Ellul has been credited with coining the phrase, "Think globally, act locally." He often said that he was born in Bordeaux by chance, but that it was by choice that he spent almost all his academic career there.

Ellul fell into a deep grief following the 16 April 1991 death of his wife, Yvette. He died three years later, on 19 May 1994 in Pessac.

== Thought ==
=== Theology ===
While Ellul was primarily a sociologist who focused on discussions of technology, he saw his theological work as an essential aspect of his career. He began publishing theological discussions early, with such books as The Presence of the Kingdom (1948).

Although a son of the minority French Reformed tradition and thus a spiritual heir of thinkers like John Calvin and Ulrich Zwingli, Ellul departed substantially from Reformed doctrinal traditions, but unlike other European Protestant thinkers, utterly rejected the influence of philosophical idealism or romanticism upon his beliefs about God and human faith. In articulating his theological ideas, he mainly drew upon the corpus of works by Barth and the critiques of European state Christianity made by Kierkegaard. Thus, some have considered him one of the more ardent expositors of dialectical theology, which was in decline elsewhere in the Western theological scene during Ellul's heyday. Much like Barth, Ellul had no use for either liberal theology (to him dominated by Enlightenment notions about the goodness of humanity and thus rendered puerile by its naïveté) or orthodox Protestantism (e.g., fundamentalism or scholastic Calvinism, both of which to him refuse to acknowledge the radical freedom of God and humanity) and maintained a roughly un-Catholic view of the Bible, theology, and the churches.

One particular theological movement that aroused his ire was death of God theology. Some within this movement held the conviction that the traditional Christian conceptions of God and humanity arise from a primitive consciousness, one that most civilized people have quite overcome. This line of thought affirmed the ethical teachings of Jesus but rejected the idea that he represented anything more than a highly accomplished human being. Ellul attacked this school, and practitioners of it such as Harvey Cox, as out of accord not with Christian doctrinal traditions, but reality itself, namely what he perceived as the irreducible religiosity of the human race, a devotion that has worshiped idols such as rulers, nations, and in more recent times materialism, scientism, technology and economics. To Ellul, people use such fallen images, or powers, as a substitute for God, and are, in turn, used by them, with no possible appeal to innocence or neutrality, which, although possible theoretically, does not in fact exist. Ellul thus renovates in a non-legalistic manner the traditional Christian understanding of original sin and espouses a thoroughgoing pessimism about human capabilities, a view most sharply evidenced in his The Meaning of the City. Ellul stated that one of the problems with these "new theologies" was:

In consequence of the desire to make the message (kerygma) valid for all, to see all men as in the presence of God, to increase the universality of the lordship of Jesus Christ, to insist on the value of mankind generally (to the detriment of the Christian), to insist on the value of the world (to the detriment of the Church), one comes to the point of denying whatever can only be specifically Christian.

The ultimate purpose of the whole death-of-God system is to justify a certain kind of behavior on the part of Christians in relation to society—a kind of behavior that is dictated by conformism to the modern world. So a justificatory formula is manufactured; and alas, it often turns out that theology merely amounts to a justification of the behavior of pretend-Christians. The theology of the death of God reinforces this evil tendency. It justifies a sociological impulsion. That is the kind of theology it really is, unconsciously. Nor do the marvelous intellectual operations its proponents perform with every appearance of seriousness make it less profoundly false.

Ellul espouses views on salvation, the sovereignty of God, and ethical action that appear to take a deliberately contrarian stance toward established, "mainstream" opinion. For instance, in the book What I Believe, he declared himself to be a Christian Universalist, writing "that all people from the beginning of time are saved by God in Jesus Christ, that they have all been recipients of His grace no matter what they have done." Ellul formulated this stance not from any liberal or humanistic sympathies, but in the main from an extremely high view of God's transcendence, that God is totally free to do what God pleases. Any attempts to modify that freedom from merely human standards of righteousness and justice amount to sin, to putting oneself in God's place, which is precisely what Adam and Eve sought to do in the creation myths in Genesis. This highly unusual juxtaposition of original sin and universal salvation has repelled liberal and conservative critics and commentators alike, who charge that such views amount to antinomianism, denying that God's laws are binding upon human beings. In most of his theologically oriented writings, Ellul effectively dismisses those charges as stemming from a radical confusion between religions as human phenomena and the unique claims of the Christian faith, which are not predicated upon human achievement or moral integrity whatsoever.

In the Bible, however, we find a God who escapes us totally, whom we absolutely cannot influence, or dominate, much less punish; a God who reveals Himself when He wants to reveal Himself, a God who is very often in a place where He is not expected, a God who is truly beyond our grasp. Thus, the human religious feeling is not at all satisfied by this situation... God descends to humanity and joins us where we are.

...the presence of faith in Jesus Christ alters reality. We also believe that hope is in no way an escape into the future, but that it is an active force, now, and that love leads us to a deeper understanding of reality. Love is probably the most realistic possible understanding of our existence. It is not an illusion. On the contrary, it is reality itself.

=== On technique ===
The Ellulian concept of technique is briefly defined within the "Notes to Reader" section of The Technological Society (1964). It is "the totality of methods rationally arrived at and having absolute efficiency (for a given stage of development) in every field of human activity." He states here as well that the term technique is not solely machines, technology, or a procedure used to attain an end.

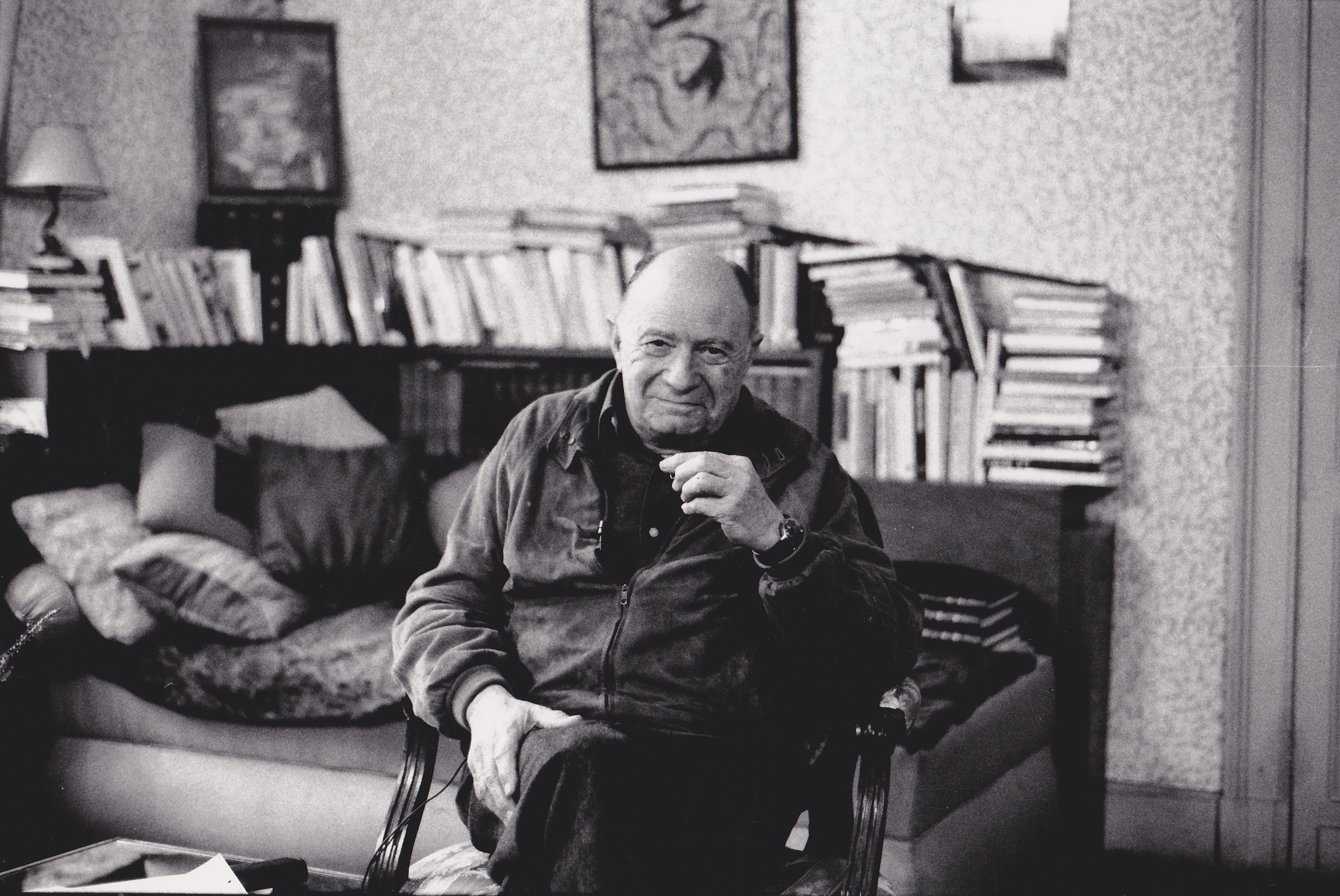
"Jacques Ellul in his house in Pessac, France", The Betrayal by Technology (documentary film; photogram), Amsterdam, NL: ReRun Productions, 1990.

What many consider to be Ellul's most important work, The Technological Society (1964), was originally published in French as La Technique: L'enjeu du siècle (literally, "The Stake of the Century"). In it, Ellul set forth seven characteristics of modern technology that make efficiency a necessity: rationality, artificiality, automatism of technical choice, self-augmentation, monism, universalism, and autonomy. The rationality of technique enforces logical and mechanical organization through division of labor, the setting of production standards, etc. And it creates an artificial system which "eliminates or subordinates the natural world."

Regarding technology, instead of it being subservient to humanity, "human beings have to adapt to it, and accept total change." As an example, Ellul offered the diminished value of the humanities to a technological society. As people begin to question the value of learning ancient languages and history, they question those things which, on the surface, do little to advance their financial and technical state. According to Ellul, this misplaced emphasis is one of the problems with modern education, as it produces a situation in which immense stress is placed on information in our schools. The focus in those schools is to prepare young people to enter the world of information, to be able to work with computers but knowing only their reasoning, their language, their combinations, and the connections between them. This movement is invading the whole intellectual domain and also that of conscience.

Ellul's commitment to scrutinize technological development is expressed as such:

[W]hat is at issue here is evaluating the danger of what might happen to our humanity in the present half-century, and distinguishing between what we want to keep and what we are ready to lose, between what we can welcome as legitimate human development and what we should reject with our last ounce of strength as dehumanization. I cannot think that choices of this kind are unimportant.

The sacred then, as classically defined, is the object of both hope and fear, both fascination and dread. Once, nature was the all-encompassing environment and power upon which human beings were dependent in life and death, and so was experienced as sacred. The Reformation desacralized the church in the name of the Bible, and the Bible became the sacred book. But since then, scientism (through Charles Darwin's theory of evolution) and reason (higher criticism and liberal theology) have desacralized the scriptures, and the sciences, particularly those applied sciences that are amenable to the aims of collective economic production (be it capitalist, socialist, or communist), have been elevated to the position of sacred in Western culture. Today, he argues, the technological society is generally held sacred. Since he defines technique as "the totality of methods rationally arrived at, and having absolute efficiency (for a given stage of development) in every field of human activity", it is clear that his sociological analysis focuses not on the society of machines as such, but on the society of "efficient techniques":

Modern technology has become a total phenomenon for civilization, the defining force of a new social order in which efficiency is no longer an option but a necessity imposed on all human activity.

It is useless, he argues, to think that a distinction can be made between technique and its use, for techniques have specific social and psychological consequences independent of human desires. There can be no room for moral considerations in their use:

Not even the moral conversion of the technicians could make a difference. At best, they would cease to be good technicians. In the end, technique has only one principle, efficient ordering.

According to Ellul, the solution is to simply view technique as objects that can be useful to us and recognize it for what it is, just another thing among many others, instead of believing in technique for its own sake or that of society. If we do this we "...destroy the basis for the power technique has over humanity."

=== On anarchy and violence ===
Ellul identified himself as a Christian anarchist. Ellul explained his view in this way: "By anarchy I mean first an absolute rejection of violence." And, "... Jesus was not only a socialist but an anarchist – and I want to stress here that I regard anarchism as the fullest and most serious form of socialism." For him, this meant that nation-states, as the primary sources of violence in the modern era, should neither be praised nor feared, but continually questioned and challenged. For Ellul, human government is largely irrelevant in that the revelation of God contained in Scripture is sufficient and exclusive. That is, being a Christian means pledging absolute allegiance to Christ, which makes other laws redundant at best or counter to the revelation of God at worst. Despite the initial attraction of some evangelicals to his thinking because of his high view of Biblical texts (i.e., generally eschewing the historical-critical method), this position alienated some conservative Protestants. Later, he would attract a following among adherents of more ethically compatible traditions such as the Anabaptists and the house church movement. Similar political ideas to Ellul's appear in the writings of a corresponding friend of his, the American William Stringfellow, and long-time admirer Vernard Eller, author of Christian Anarchy. Ellul identified the State and political power as the Beast in the Book of Revelation.

Jacques Ellul discusses anarchy on a few pages in The Ethics of Freedom and in more detail within his later work, Anarchy & Christianity. Although he does admit that anarchy does not seem to be a direct expression of Christian freedom, he concludes that the absolute power he sees within the current (as of 1991) nation-state can only be responded to with an absolute negative position (i.e. anarchy). He states that his intention is not to establish an unrealistically pure anarchist society or the total destruction of the state. His initial point in Anarchy & Christianity is that he is led toward a realistic form of anarchy by his commitment to an absolute rejection of violence through the creation of alternative grassroots institutions in the manner similar to Anarcho-Syndicalism. However, Ellul does not entertain the idea that all Christians in all places and all times will refrain from violence. Rather, he insisted that violence could not be reconciled with the God of Love, and thus, true freedom. A Christian that chooses the path of violence must admit that he or she is abandoning the path of freedom and committing to the way of necessity.

During the Spanish Civil War Spanish anarchist friends of Ellul's soon-to-be wife came to France in search of weapons. He tried to get some for them through an old school friend of his and claimed that this was probably the one time in his life when he was sufficiently motivated to commit an act of violence. He did not go with the anarchists primarily because he had only recently met the woman that would become his wife and did not wish to leave her.

Ellul states in The Subversion of Christianity that he thinks "that the biblical teaching is clear. It always contests political power. It incites to 'counterpower,' to 'positive' criticism, to an irreducible dialogue (like that between king and prophet in Israel), to antistatism, to a decentralizing of the relation, to an extreme relativizing of everything political, to an anti-ideology, to a questioning of all that claims either power or dominion (in other words, of all things political), and finally, if we may use a modern term, to a kind of "anarchism" (so long as we do not relate the term to the anarchist teaching of the nineteenth century)." As Patrick Chastenet put it, Ellul is "with god, without master".

Ellul states in Violence that idealism serves to justify the use of violence, including:

1. revolutionary idealism (viewing violence as a means to an end and/or violence under the mask of legality)
2. generous idealism (leading to violence toward reconciliation and/or a blindness of the violence of one's enemy)

... there is generous idealism of so many young men who risk imprisonment or death rather than participate in a war they condemn only because they idealize and whitewash their country's enemy. Those young men are heroes and fools both. They are repelled by the violence they see—the massive, enormous violence that cries to heaven. And they are right. But seeing this highly visible violence, they forthwith make lambs, saints, and martyrs of its victims. For they close their eyes to what the enemy is really like, to his cruelty, his violence, his lies. They overlook his real intentions; they overlook the fact that he would use terrible violence if he won power. Poor young men, totally unknowing, uncomprehending, blind, perceiving only what is happening now! So they side with the enemy and countenance the enemy's violence. In France, before the Second World War, a great many people sided with the Nazis. Hadn't the Nazis, out of their generosity, protested against the violence done the Sudeten Germans, the Croats, the Germans of Danzig? Hadn't they declared that they would defend the rights of the poor and the unemployed, the victims exploited by the capitalists? Their admiration of the Nazis cost those people dearly. Again, after the war, many French people sided with communism, 'the party of the poor, the proletariat.' A few years later they were stunned by the declarations of the Twentieth Communist Congress and by Moscow's suppression of the Hungarian revolt. This is the kind of idealism that must be combated and radically condemned."

3. pacifist idealism (beliefs and lifestyles which are only possible within a larger violence-based society)

4. Christian idealism (which is always concerned with the moral goodness of the human world). This leads to concepts of progressiveness and unreserved participation with good conscience in political or scientific action. "In their idyllic world, harshness, torture, and war seem abnormal and almost incomprehensible. But it is only gross, highly visible, undeniable violence that evokes this scandalized reaction. They deny the existence of masked, secret, covert violence—insofar as this can be concealed..."

Ellul's ultimate goal was to create by evolutionary means a "...Proudhonian socialism...by transforming the press, the media, and the economic structures...by means of a federative cooperative approach..." an anarchist society based on federation and the mutualist economics of Proudhon.

=== On justice ===
Ellul believed that social justice and true freedom were incompatible. He rejected any attempt to reconcile them. He believed that a Christian could choose to join a movement for justice, but in doing so, must admit that this fight for justice is necessarily, and at the same time, a fight against all forms of freedom. While social justice provides a guarantee against the risk of bondage, it simultaneously subjects a life to necessities. Ellul believed that when a Christian decides to act it must be in a way that is specifically Christian. "Christians must never identify themselves with this or that political or economic movement. Rather, they must bring to social movements what they alone can provide. Only so can they signalize the kingdom. So far as they act like the others—even to forward social justice, equality, etc.—I say that there is no sense and nothing specifically Christian in acting like the others. In fact the political and revolutionary attitude proper to the Christian is radically different from the attitude of others; it is specifically Christian or else it is nothing."

In Violence Ellul states his belief that only God is able to establish justice and God alone who will institute the kingdom at the end of time. He acknowledges that some have used this as an excuse to do nothing, but also points out how some death-of-God advocates use this to claim that "we ourselves must undertake to establish social justice". Ellul maintained that without a belief in the traditional Judeo-Christian conception of God, love and the pursuit for justice becomes selective, for the only relation left is the horizontal one. Ellul asks how we are to define justice and claims that followers of death-of-God theology and/or philosophy clung to Matthew 25 stating that justice requires them to feed the poor. Ellul says that many European Christians rushed into socialist circles (and with this began to accept the movement's tactics of violence, propaganda, etc.) mistakenly thinking socialism would assure justice when in fact it only pursues justice for the chosen and/or interesting poor whose condition (as a victim of capitalism or some other socialist enemy) is consistent with the socialist ideology.

... Jesus Christ has not come to establish social justice any more than he has come to establish the power of the state or the reign of money or art. Jesus Christ has come to save men, and all that matters is that men may come to know him. We are adept at finding reasons—good theological, political, or practical reasons, for camouflaging this. But the real reason is that we let ourselves be impressed and dominated by the forces of the world, by the press, by public opinion, by the political game, by appeals to justice, liberty, peace, the poverty of the third world, and the Christian civilization of the west, all of which play on our inclinations and weaknesses. Modern protestants are in the main prepared to be all things to all men, like St. Paul, but unfortunately this is not in order that they may save some but in order that they may be like all men.

Ellul states in The Subversion of Christianity that "to proclaim the class conflict and the 'classical' revolutionary struggle is to stop at the same point as those who defend their goods and organizations. This may be useful socially but it is not at all Christian in spite of the disconcerting efforts of theologies of revolution. Revelation demands this renunciation—the renunciation of illusions, of historic hopes, of references to our own abilities or numbers or sense of justice. We are to tell people and thus to increase their awareness (the offense of the ruling classes is that of trying to blind and deaden the awareness of those whom they dominate). Renounce everything in order to be everything. Trust in no human means, for God will provide (we cannot say where, when, or how). Have confidence in his Word and not in a rational program. Enter on a way on which you will gradually find answers but with no guaranteed substance. All this is difficult, much more so than recruiting guerillas, instigating terrorism, or stirring up the masses. And this is why the gospel is so intolerable, intolerable to myself as I speak, as I say all this to myself and others, intolerable for readers, who can only shrug their shoulders."

If the disciples had wanted their preaching to be effective, to recruit good people, to move the crowds, to launch a movement, they would have made the message more material. They would have formulated material goals in the economic, social, and political spheres. This would have stirred people up; this would have been the easy way. To declare, however, that the kingdom is not of this world, that freedom is not achieved by revolt, that rebellion serves no purpose, that there neither is nor will be any paradise on earth, that there is no social justice, that the only justice resides in God and comes from him, that we are not to look for responsibility and culpability in others but first in ourselves, all this is to ask for defeat, for it is to say intolerable things.

=== On media, propaganda, and information ===
Ellul discusses these topics in detail in his landmark work, Propaganda: The Formation of Men's Attitudes. He viewed the power of the media as another example of technology exerting control over human destiny. As a mechanism of change, the media are almost invariably manipulated by special interests, whether of the market or the state.

Also within Propaganda Ellul claims that "it is a fact that excessive data do not enlighten the reader or the listener; they drown him. He cannot remember them all, or coordinate them, or understand them; if he does not want to risk losing his mind, he will merely draw a general picture from them. And the more facts supplied, the more simplistic the image". Additionally, people become "caught in a web of facts they have been given. They cannot even form a choice or a judgment in other areas or on other subjects. Thus the mechanisms of modern information induce a sort of hypnosis in the individual, who cannot get out of the field that has been laid out for him by the information". "It is not true that he can choose freely with regard to what is presented to him as the truth. And because rational propaganda thus creates an irrational situation, it remains, above all, propaganda—that is, an inner control over the individual by a social force, which means that it deprives him of himself".

Ellul agreed with Jules Monnerot who stated that "All individual passion leads to the suppression of all critical judgment with regard to the object of that passion".

The individual who burns with desire for action but does not know what to do is a common type in our society. He wants to act for the sake of justice, peace, progress, but does not know how. If propaganda can show him this 'how' then it has won the game; action will surely follow".

In response to an invitation from Protestant associations, Ellul visited Germany twice (1934 and 1935). On the second visit he attended a Nazi meeting out of curiosity which influenced his later work on propaganda and its ability to unify a group.

"To throw this wager or secular faith into the boldest possible relief, Ellul places it in dialectical contrast with Biblical faith. As a dialectical contrast to "La Technique," for instance, Ellul writes Sans feu ni lieu (published in 1975, although written much earlier.)"

=== On humanism ===
In explaining the significance of freedom and the purpose for resisting the enslavement of humans via acculturation (or sociological bondage), Ellul rejects the notion that this is due to some supposed supreme importance linked to humanity. He states that modern enslavement expresses how authority, signification, and value are attached to humanity and the beliefs and institutions it creates. This leads to an exaltation of the nation or state, money, technology, art, morality, the party, etc. The work of humanity is glorified and worshiped, while simultaneously enslaving humankind.

... man himself is exalted, and paradoxical though it may seem to be, this means the crushing of man. Man's enslavement is the reverse side of the glory, value, and importance that are ascribed to him. The more a society magnifies human greatness, the more one will see men alienated, enslaved, imprisoned, and tortured, in it. Humanism prepares the ground for the anti-human. We do not say that this is an intellectual paradox. All one need do is read history. Men have never been so oppressed as in societies which set man at the pinnacle of values and exalt his greatness or make him the measure of all things. For in such societies freedom is detached from its purpose, which is, we affirm, the glory of God.

Before God I am a human being... But I am caught in a situation from which there is truly and radically no escape, in a spider's web I cannot break. If I am to continue to be a living human being, someone must come to free me. In other words, God is not trying to humiliate me. What is mortally affronted in this situation is not my humanity or my dignity. It is my pride, the vainglorious declaration that I can do it all myself. This we cannot accept. In our own eyes we have to declare ourselves to be righteous and free. We do not want grace. Fundamentally what we want is self-justification. There thus commences the patient work of reinterpreting revelation so as to make of it a Christianity that will glorify humanity and in which humanity will be able to take credit for its own righteousness.

== Bibliography ==
- Étude sur l'évolution et la nature juridique du Mancipium. Bordeaux: Delmas, 1936.
- Le fondement théologique du droit. Neuchâtel: Delachaux & Niestlé, 1946.
  - The Theological Foundation of Law. Trans. Marguerite Wieser. Garden City NY: Doubleday, 1960. London: SCM, 1961. New York: Seabury, 1969.
- Présence au monde moderne: Problèmes de la civilisation post-chrétienne. Geneva: Roulet, 1948. Lausanne: Presses Bibliques Universitaires, 1988.
  - The Presence of the Kingdom. Trans. Olive Wyon. Philadelphia: Westminster, 1951. London: SCM, 1951. New York: Seabury, 1967. Colorado Springs: Helmers and Howard, 1989.
  - Presence in the Modern World: A New Translation. Trans. Lisa Richmond. Eugene, OR: Cascade, 2016.
- Le livre de Jonas. Paris: Cahiers Bibliques de Foi et Vie, 1952.
  - The Judgment of Jonah. Trans. Geoffrey W. Bromiley. Grand Rapids: Eerdmans, 1971. Wipf & Stock, 2011
- L'homme et l'argent (Nova et vetera). Neuchâtel: Delachaux & Niestlé, 1954. Lausanne: Presses Bibliques Universitaires, 1979.
  - Money and Power. Trans. LaVonne Neff. Downers Grove IL: InterVarsity Press, 1984. Basingstoke, England: Marshall Pickering, 1986. Wipf & Stock, 2009
- La technique ou l'enjeu du siècle. Paris: Armand Colin, 1954. Paris: Économica, 1990 & 2008
  - The Technological Society. Trans. John Wilkinson. New York: Knopf, 1964. London: Jonathan Cape, 1965. Rev. ed.: New York: Knopf/Vintage, 1967. with introduction by Robert K. Merton (professor of sociology, Columbia University). This may be his best-known work; Aldous Huxley brought the French edition to the attention of an English publisher, and thus brought it to English readers. Theodore Kaczynski had a copy in his cabin and said he read it several times—his "manifesto" and other writings were influenced by it and addressed similar themes. A 2021 study uses Kaczynski's annotated photocopy of The Technological Society to identify the specific ideas that Kaczynski borrowed from Ellul.
- Histoire des institutions. Paris: Presses Universitaires de France; volumes 1 & 2, L'Antiquité (1955); vol. 3, Le Moyen Age (1956); vol. 4, Les XVIe–XVIIIe siècle (1956); vol. 5, Le XIXe siècle (1789–1914) (1956).
- Propagandes. Paris: A. Colin, 1962. Paris: Économica, 1990 & 2008
  - Propaganda: The Formation of Men's Attitudes. Trans. Konrad Kellen & Jean Lerner. New York: Knopf, 1965. New York: Random House/ Vintage 1973
- Fausse présence au monde moderne. Paris: Les Bergers et Les Mages, 1963.
  - False Presence of the Kingdom. Trans. C. Edward Hopkin. New York: Seabury, 1972.
- Le vouloir et le faire: Recherches éthiques pour les chrétiens: Introduction (première partie). Geneva: Labor et Fides, 1964.
  - To Will and to Do: An Ethical Research for Christians. Trans. C. Edward Hopkin. Philadelphia: Pilgrim, 1969.
  - To Will and To Do Volume One: An Introduction to Christian Ethics. Trans. Jacob Marques Rollison. Wipf & Stock, 2020.
  - To Will and To Do Volume Two: Introduction to Christian Ethics. Trans. Jacob Marques Rollison. Wipf & Stock, 2021.
- L'illusion politique. Paris: Robert Laffont, 1965. Rev. ed.: Paris: Librairie Générale Française, 1977. La Table-ronde, 2004 & 2012.
  - The Political Illusion. Trans. Konrad Kellen. New York: Knopf, 1967. New York: Random House/Vintage, 1972.
- Exégèse des nouveaux lieux communs. Paris: Calmann-Lévy, 1966. Paris: La Table Ronde, 1994 & 2004
  - A Critique of the New Commonplaces. Trans. Helen Weaver. New York: Knopf, 1968. Wipf & Stock, 2012
- Politique de Dieu, politiques de l'homme. Paris: Éditions Universitaires, 1966.
  - The Politics of God and the Politics of Man. Trans./ed. Geoffrey W. Bromiley. Grand Rapids: Eerdmans, 1972. Wipf & Stock, 2012.
- Histoire de la propagande. Paris: Presses Universitaires de France, 1967, 1976.
- Métamorphose du bourgeois. Paris: Calmann-Lévy, 1967. Paris: La Table Ronde, 1998 & 2012.
- Autopsie de la révolution. Paris: Calmann-Lévy, 1969. Paris: La Table Ronde, 2008
  - Autopsy of Revolution. Trans. Patricia Wolf. New York: Knopf, 1971. Wipf & Stock, 2012.
- Contre les violents. Paris: Centurion, 1972.
  - Violence: Reflections from a Christian Perspective. Trans. Cecelia Gaul Kings. New York: Seabury, 1969. London: SCM Press, 1970. London: Mowbrays, 1978. Wipf & Stock, 2012.
- Sans feu ni lieu: Signification biblique de la Grande Ville. Paris: Gallimard, 1975.
  - The Meaning of the City. Trans. Dennis Pardee. Grand Rapids: Eerdmans, 1970. Carlisle, Cumbria, England: Paternoster, 1997. Wipf & Stock, 2011.
- L'impossible prière. Paris: Centurion, 1971, 1977.
  - Prayer and Modern Man. Trans. C. Edward Hopkin. New York: Seabury, 1970, 1973. Wipf & Stock, 2012.
- Jeunesse délinquante: Une expérience en province. Avec Yves Charrier. Paris: Mercure de France, 1971. 2nd ed.: Jeunesse délinquante: Des blousons noirs aux hippies. Nantes: Éditions de l'AREFPPI, 1985.
- De la révolution aux révoltes. Paris: Calmann-Lévy, 1972.
- L'espérance oubliée. Paris: Gallimard, 1972.
  - Hope in Time of Abandonment. Trans. C. Edward Hopkin. New York: Seabury, 1973. Wipf & Stock, 2012.
- Éthique de la liberté, 2 vols. Geneva: Labor et Fides, I:1973, II:1974.
  - The Ethics of Freedom. Trans. and ed. Geoffrey W. Bromiley. Grand Rapids: Eerdmans, 1976. London: Mowbrays, 1976.
- Les nouveaux possédés. Paris: Arthème Fayard, 1973.
  - The New Demons. Trans. C. Edward Hopkin. New York: Seabury, 1975. London: Mowbrays, 1975.
- L'Apocalypse: Architecture en mouvement. Paris: Desclée, 1975.
  - Apocalypse: The Book of Revelation. Trans. George W. Schreiner. New York: Seabury, 1977. Wipf & Stock, 2020.
- Trahison de l'Occident. Paris: Calmann-Lévy, 1975.
  - The Betrayal of the West. Trans. Matthew J. O'Connell. New York: Seabury,1978.
- Le système technicien. Paris: Calmann-Lévy, 1977. Paris : Le cherche-midi 2004 & 2012.
  - The Technological System. Trans. Joachim Neugroschel. New York: Continuum, 1980.
  - The Technological System. Trans. Lisa Richmond. Wipf & Stock, 2018.
- L'idéologie marxiste chrétienne. Paris: Centurion, 1979.
  - Jesus and Marx: From Gospel to Ideology. Trans. Joyce Main Hanks. Grand Rapids: Eerdmans, 1988. Wipf & Stock, 2012.
- L'empire du non-sens: L'art et la société technicienne. Paris: Press Universitaires de France, 1980.
  - The Empire of Non-Sense: Art in The Technological Society. Trans. Michael Johnson & David Lovekin. Papadakis Dist A C, 2014.
- La foi au prix du doute: "Encore quarante jours . . ." Paris: Hachette, 1980.
  - Living Faith: Belief and Doubt in a Perilous World. Trans. Peter Heinegg. San Francisco: Harper and Row, 1983. Wipf & Stock, 2012.
- La Parole humiliée. Paris: Seuil, 1981.
  - The Humiliation of the Word. Trans. Joyce Main Hanks. Grand Rapids: Eerdmans, 1985. Wipf & Stock, 2021.
- Changer de révolution: L'inéluctable prolétariat. Paris: Seuil, 1982.
- Les combats de la liberté. (Tome 3, L'Ethique de la Liberté) Geneva: Labor et Fides, 1984. Paris: Centurion, 1984.
- La subversion du Christianisme. Paris: Seuil, 1984, 1994. Paris: La Table Ronde, 2001 & 2012
  - The Subversion of Christianity. Trans. Geoffrey W. Bromiley. Grand Rapids: Eerdmans, 1986. Wipf & Stock, 2011.
- Conférence sur l'Apocalypse de Jean. Nantes: AREFPPI, 1985.
- Un chrétien pour Israël. Monaco: Éditions du Rocher, 1986.
- La Genèse aujourd'hui. Avec François Tosquelles. Ligné: AREFPPI, 1987.
- La raison d'être: Méditation sur l'Ecclésiaste. Paris: Seuil, 1987
  - Reason for Being: A Meditation on Ecclesiastes. Trans. Joyce Main Hanks. Grand Rapids: Eerdmans, 1990. Wipf & Stock, 2022.
- Anarchie et Christianisme. Lyon: Atelier de Création Libertaire, 1988. Paris: La Table Ronde, 1998.
  - Anarchy and Christianity. Trans. Geoffrey W. Bromiley. Grand Rapids: Eerdmans, 1991. Wipf & Stock, 2011.
- Le bluff technologique. Paris: Hachette, 1988, 2004 & 2012.
  - The Technological Bluff. Trans. Geoffrey W. Bromiley. Grand Rapids: Eerdmans, 1990.
- Ce que je crois. Paris: Grasset and Fasquelle, 1989.
  - What I Believe. Trans. Geoffrey W. Bromiley. Grand Rapids: Eerdmans, 1989.
- Ce Dieu injuste . . .?: Théologie chrétienne pour le peuple d'Israël. Paris: Arléa, 1991, 1999.
  - An Unjust God ? A Christian Theology of Israel in light of Romans 9–11. Trans. Anne-Marie Andreasson-Hogg. Wipf & Stock, 2012.
- Si tu es le Fils de Dieu: Souffrances et tentations de Jésus. Paris: Centurion, 1991.
  - If You are the Son of God: The Suffering and Temptations of Jesus. Trans. Anne-Marie Andreasson-Hogg. Wipf & Stock, 2014.
- Déviances et déviants dans notre société intolérante. Toulouse: Érés, 1992.
- Silences: Poèmes. Bordeaux: Opales, 1995.
- Oratorio: Les quatre cavaliers de l'Apocalypse. Bordeaux: Opales, 1997.
- Sources and Trajectories: Eight Early Articles by Jacques Ellul that Set the Stage. Trans./ed. Marva J. Dawn. Grand Rapids: Eerdmans, 1997.
- La pensée marxiste. Paris: La Table ronde, 2003.
- Islam et judéo-christianisme. Paris: Presses Universitaires de France, 2006.
- Les successeurs de Marx. Paris: La Table ronde, 2007.
- Penser globalement, agir localement: Chroniques journalistiques. Bordeaux: Pyrémonde, 2007.
- Israël, Chance de civilisation: compilation d'articles. Paris: Première partie, 2008.
- Pour qui, pour quoi travaillons-nous ?. Paris: La Table Ronde, 2013.
- Théologie et technique : Pour une éthique de la non-puissance. Genève: Labor et Fides, 2014.
  - Theology and Technique: Toward an Ethic of Non-Power. Trans. Christian Roy. Wipf & Stock, 2024.
- Les classes sociales. Paris: La Table ronde, 2018.
- Vivre et penser la liberté. Genève: Labor et Fides, 2019.
- La loi de liberté. Commentaire de l'épître de Jacques. Bayard Adulte, 2020.
- Philosophie du droit. Paris: La Table ronde, 2022.
- Ethique de la sainte. Genève: Labor et Fides, 2024.

Interviews

- "A temps et à contretemps: Entretiens avec Madeleine Garrigou-Lagrange". Paris: Centurion, 1981.
- "In Season, Out of Season: An Introduction to the Thought of Jacques Ellul: Interviews by Madeleine Garrigou-Lagrange." Trans. Lani K. Niles. San Francisco: Harper and Row, 1982.
- "Perspectives on Our Age: Jacques Ellul Speaks on His Life and Work". Ed. Willem H. Vanderburg. Trans. Joachim Neugroschel. Toronto: CBC, 1981. New York: Seabury, 1981. Concord, Ontario: House of Anansi, 1997.
- "L'homme à lui-même: Correspondance". Avec Didier Nordon. Paris: Félin, 1992.
- "Entretiens avec Jacques Ellul". Patrick Chastenet. Paris: Table Ronde, 1994.
- "Jacques Ellul on Religion, Technology, and Politics: Conversations with Patrick Troude-Chastenet". Trans. Joan Mendès France. Atlanta: Scholars Press, 1998.
- "Jacques Ellul on Politics, Technology, and Christianity: Conversations with Patrick Troude-Chastenet". Eugene, Oregon: Wipf and Stock, 2005.

English translations

- Ellul, Jacques (1964), "translator's introduction", The Technological Society, Vintage Books, John Wilkinson transl., Random House.
- ——— (1964b), The Technological Society, Knopf.
- ——— (1965), Propaganda: The Formation of Men's Attitudes, Knopf.
- ——— (1969), Violence: Reflections from a Christian Perspective, Seabury.
- ——— (1975), The New Demons, Seabury Press.
- ——— (1976) [1973/74, Labor & fides], Éthique de la liberté [The Ethics of Freedom] (in French), transl. Geoffrey W. Bromiley, Michigan: William B Eerdmans.
- ——— (1981), Perspectives on Our Age, Seabury Press.
- ——— (1986) [1984, Éditions du Seuil], La Subversion de Christianisme [The Subversion of Christianity] (in French), translated by Geoffrey W. Bromiley, Michigan: William B Eerdmans.
- ——— (1988) [Atelier de Création Libertaire], Anarchie et Christianisme [Anarchy and Christianity], translated by Geoffrey W. Bromiley, Michigan: William B Eerdmans, pp. 71–74, ISBN 9780802804952
- ——— (1989), What I Believe, transl. Geoffrey W. Bromiley, Michigan: William B Eerdmans.
- ——— (1990), The Technological Bluff, transl. Geoffrey W. Bromiley, Michigan: William B Eerdmans.
- ——— (1991), Anarchy and Christianity, Michigan: William B Eerdmans.
- ———; Troude-Chastenet, Patrick (1998), On Religion, Technology, Politics: Conversations, France, Joan Mendes transl., Scholars Press.

== See also ==
- Christian anarchism
- Christian libertarianism
- Indoctrination
- John Zerzan
- Koyaanisqatsi
- Langdon Winner
- Noam Chomsky
- Non-conformists of the 1930s
- Philosophy of technology
- Randal Marlin
- Slavoj Žižek
- Ted Kaczynski and the Unabomber Manifesto, influenced by the philosophy of Jacques Ellul
- Universal reconciliation

== Sources ==
- Boli-Bennett, John. "The absolute dialectics of Jacques Ellul." Research in Philosophy and Technology 3 (1980): 171–201.
- Bromiley, Geoffrey W. "Barth’s influence on Jacques Ellul." Jacques Ellul: Interpretive Essays (1981): 32–51.
- Chastenet Patrick, Introduction à Jacques Ellul, Paris, La Découverte, 2019.
- Chastenet, Patrick, "Les Racines libertaires de l'écologie politique.", Paris, L'échappée, 2023, p. 29-73.
- Christians, Clifford G., & Van Hook, Jay M., eds. Jacques Ellul: Interpretive Essays. Illinois: University of Illinois Press, 1981.
- Clendenin, Daniel B. "THEOLOGICAL METHOD IN JACQUES ELLUL." (1986): 3756-3756.
- Connell, Brian Lindsay (1999). "Interpretation of the law & the laws of interpretation in the work of Jacques Ellul". Global Journal of Classical Theology. 1 (3). ISSN 1521-6055.
- Dawn, Marva Jenine. "The concept of 'the principalities and powers' in the works of Jacques Ellul." (1993): 0533-0533.
- Dawn, Marva Jenine "The Biblical Concept of ‘the Principalities and Powers’: John Yoder Points to Jacques Ellul." The Wisdom of the Cross: Essays in Honor of John Howard Yoder: 168-86.
- Driscoll, Cathy, and Elden Wiebe. "Technical spirituality at work: Jacques Ellul on workplace spirituality." Journal of Management Inquiry 16.4 (2007): 333–348.
- Eller, Vernard, “How Jacques Ellul Reads the Bible,” Christian Century 89 (1972): 1212–1215.
- Ellul, Jacques, and Madeleine Garrigou-Lagrange. In season, out of season: an introduction to the thought of Jacques Ellul. Harper San Francisco, 1982.
- Fasching, Darrell J. The thought of Jacques Ellul: A systematic exposition. Vol. 7. Lewiston, New York: Edwin Mellen Press, 1981.
- Fasching, Darrell J. "The Dialectic of Apocalypse and Utopia in the Theological Ethics of Jacques Ellul." Research in Philosophy and Technology 10 (1990): 149–165.
- Fowler, James. "A synopsis and analysis of the thought and writings of Jacques Ellul." (2012).
- Gill, David W., "Jacques Ellul’s View of Scripture." Journal of the Evangelical Theological Society 25 (1982).
- Gill, David W. "The word of God in the ethics of Jacques Ellul." (1984).
- Goddard, Andrew (2002), Living the Word, Resisting the World: The Life and Thought of Jacques Ellul, Paternoster Press.
- Gozzi Jr, Raymond. "Jacques Ellul on technique, media, and the spirit." Atlantic Journal of Communication 8.1 (2000): 79–90.
- Graham, George J. "Jacques Ellul-Prophetic or Apocalyptic Theologian of Technology?." The Political Science Reviewer 13 (1983): 213.
- Greenman, Jeffrey P., Read Mercer Schuchardt, and Noah J. Toly. Understanding Jacques Ellul. Wipf and Stock Publishers, 2012.
- Holloway, James Y., ed. Introducing Jacques Ellul. Eerdmans, 1970.
- Hope, Samuel. "Homage to Jacques Ellul." Arts Education Policy Review 97.5 (1996): 38–39.
- Jerónimo, Helena M., and Carl Mitcham. Jacques Ellul and the technological society in the 21st century. Ed. José Luís Garcia. Springer, 2013.
- Lasch, Christopher (1973). "The Social Thought of Jacques Ellul". The World of Nations: Reflections on American History, Politics, and Culture. New York, NY: Knopf. ISBN 978-0-394-48394-8.
- Lovekin, David. "Jacques Ellul and the logic of technology." Man and World 10.3 (1977): 251–272.
- Lovekin, David. Technique, discourse, and consciousness: An introduction to the philosophy of Jacques Ellul. Lehigh University Press, 1991.
- Menninger, David C. "Jacques Ellul: A tempered profile." The Review of Politics 37.2 (1975): 235–246.
- Menninger, David C. "Marx in the Social Thought of Jacques Ellul.”." Jacques Ellul: Interpretive Essays (1981): 17-32.
- Menninger, David. "Politics or technique? A defense of Jacques Ellul." Polity 14.1 (1981): 110–127.
- Mitcham, Carl. "Thinking Through Technology." The University of Chicago Press, 1994.
- Pattillo, Matthew. "Violence, Anarchy, and Scripture: Jacques Ellul and René Girard." Contagion: Journal of Violence, Mimesis, and Culture 11.1 (2004): 25–54.
- Pizza, Cesare (2017), Jacques Ellul: un profeta di sventure, Roma, ISBN 9788892321663
- Punzo, Vincent. "Jacques Ellul on the technical system and the challenge of Christian hope." Proceedings of the American Catholic Philosophical Association. Vol. 70. 1996.
- Ray, Ronald R., “Jacques Ellul’s Innocent Notes on Hermeneutics,” Interpretation 33 (1979): 268–282.
- Roy, Christian. "Ecological Personalism: The Bordeaux School of Bernard Charbonneau and Jacques Ellul»." Ethical perspectives 6.1 (1999): 33-45.2014 -
- Shaw, Jeffrey M. Illusions of Freedom: Thomas Merton and Jacques Ellul on Technology and the Human Condition. Eugene, OR: Wipf and Stock. ISBN 978-1625640581.
- Sklair, Leslie. "The Sociology of the Opposition to Science and Technology: With Special Reference to the Work of Jacques Ellul." Comparative Studies in Society and History 13.2 (1971): 217–235.
- Terlizzese, Lawrence J. Hope in the thought of Jacques Ellul. Wipf and Stock Publishers, 2005.
- Troup, Calvin L. "Include the Iconoclast: The Voice of Jacques Ellul in Contemporary Theory and Criticism." Journal of Communication & Religion 21.1 (1998).
- Vanderburg, Willem H. "Technique and Responsibility: Think Globally, Act Locally, According to Jacques Ellul." Technology and Responsibility. Springer Netherlands, 1987. 115–132.
- Vanderburg, Willem H. "The Essential Connection Between the Two Parts of the Work of Jacques Ellul." Bulletin of Science, Technology & Society 24.6 (2004): 534–547.
- Van Vleet, Jacob E. Dialectical Theology and Jacques Ellul: An Introductory Exposition. Augsburg Fortress Publishers, 2014.
