= The Subversion of Christianity =

Christian anarchist book

- Title page for La subversion du christianisme (1984)
- Author: Jacques Ellul
- Original title: La subversion du christianisme
- Language: French
- Subject: Christian anarchism Feminism
- Genre: Non fiction
- Publication date: 1984
- Publication place: France

The Subversion of Christianity is a book written by Jacques Ellul and published in 1984 by Éditions du Seuil. Released four years before Anarchy and Christianity, it offers an anarchist and Christian reflection on Christianity.

The author argues that the message and actions of Jesus were fundamentally radical and anti-political. These, however, would have been corrupted through various dynamics, including Christians' participation in the state and their increasing collusion with money. Ellul also presents feminist ideas, notably suggesting that the centrality of Mary in Christianity contributed to the establishment of patriarchy by creating a distinction between "ordinary" women and the mother of Jesus.

== Contents ==
The work begins with a conclusion drawn by the author: Christianity would have distorted the message of the Gospels. Christians, he argues, failed to resist "political contaminations" during the conversion of the Roman Empire. The same occurred with economic issues, particularly with the rise of capitalism, as well as with religious matters, as other religions influenced Christianity. The institutional Church, according to Ellul, embodies this subversion, making this one of his most controversial texts regarding the Church.

Ellul contrasts this negative subversion—dominated by the State or money—with a positive subversion, which he claims was preached by Jesus. Christians, he argues, are called to subvert society by engaging in critical reflection and action "against the powers of money, political authority, and even the religious domain itself". The thinker also critiques the concept of a purely transcendent God, claiming that this transcendence gave rise to modern nihilism. He does not spare Christian anarchism either, criticizing it for absolutizing politics.

The work is heavily influenced by the philosophy of Kierkegaard, whom Ellul quotes directly in a passage questioning the "massification" of Christian conversion in the 4th century. Ellul also advances feminist ideas, notably by asserting that the centrality of Mary in Christianity facilitated the establishment of patriarchy by creating a distinction between "ordinary" women and the mother of Jesus.

Moreover, Ellul insists that Jesus was fundamentally nonviolent.
