= David Kaczynski =

Brother of bomber Ted Kaczynski (born 1949)

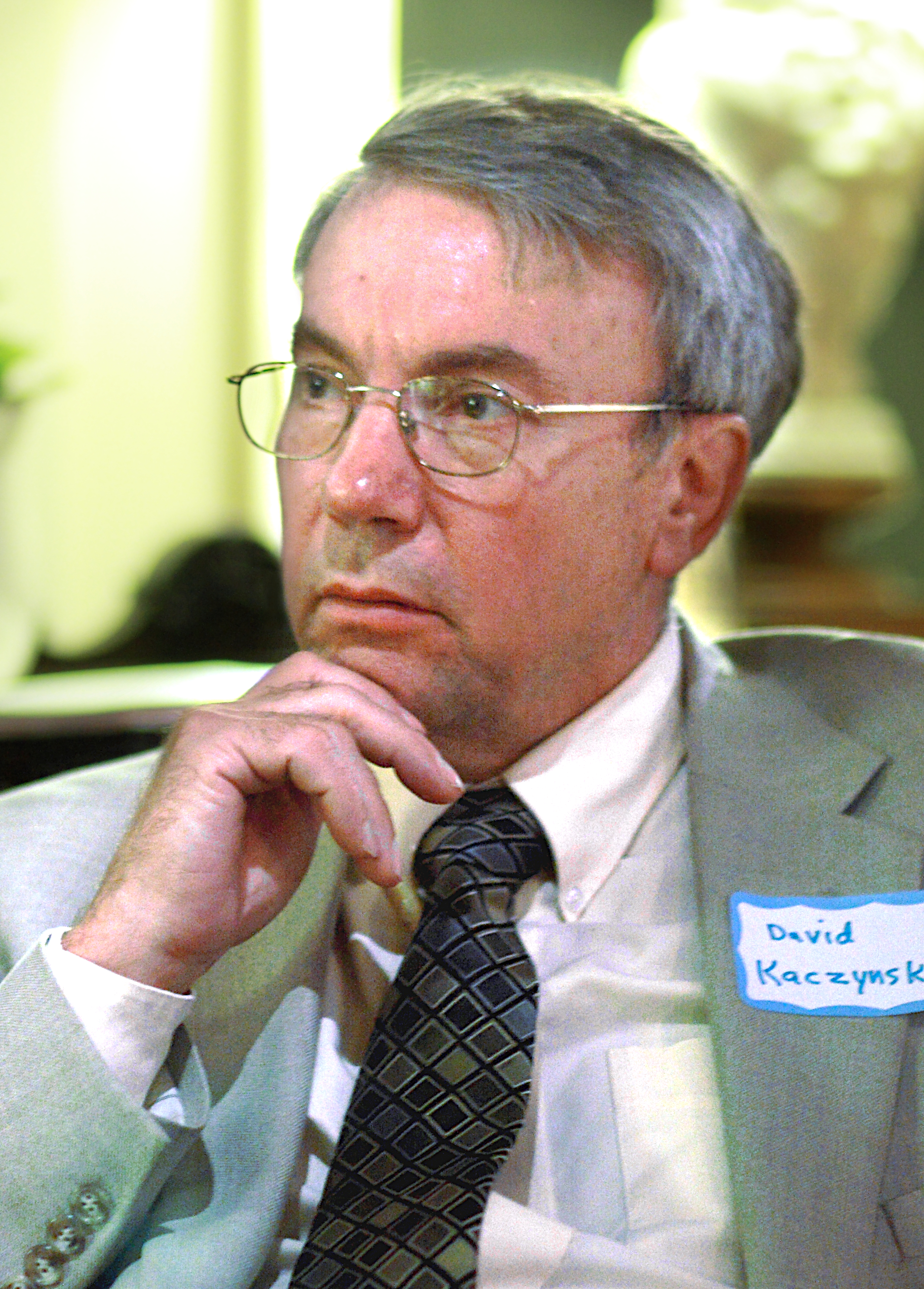
- Kaczynski in 2008
- Born: David Richard Kaczynski; October 3, 1949 (age 77); Chicago, Illinois, U.S.
- Education: Columbia University (BA); College of Great Falls
- Occupation: Teacher
- Known for: Role in the arrest of Ted Kaczynski
- Spouse: Linda Patrik
- Relatives: Ted Kaczynski (brother)

David Richard Kaczynski (born October 3, 1949) is an American charity worker. He is the younger brother of the domestic terrorist and mathematician Ted Kaczynski, also known as the Unabomber.

His memoir, Every Last Tie: The Story of the Unabomber and His Family, details both his relationships with his brother and their parents, and his wife Linda's decision to report their suspicions of Ted to the Federal Bureau of Investigation (FBI), which ultimately led to his arrest in 1996. The decision prompted Ted to cease all communication with his family, including rejecting all of David's attempted correspondence until Ted's suicide in prison in 2023.

== Biography ==
=== Early life ===
Kaczynski graduated from Columbia University in 1970. Between December 1966 and May 1967, he wrote 10 articles for the Columbia Daily Spectator and was promoted to the associate news board in March 1967. Kaczynski worked as a schoolteacher in Lisbon, Iowa, in the mid-1970s.

Like his older brother, David Kaczynski rejected society and lived for an extended period in isolation. In 1984, Kaczynski bought a plot of land in remote Brewster County, Texas, dug a hole in the Chihuahuan Desert soil, and partially covered the opening with metal sheets to live in while he built a cabin nearby. In 1990, following the death of his father, he returned to society and married his former high school sweetheart, Linda Patrik. Ted refused to come to his brother's wedding, and subsequently Linda never met Ted.

=== Role in Unabomber's arrest ===
In 1995, the then-anonymous Unabomber demanded via Industrial Society and Its Future that his 1995 manifesto be published in a major newspaper as a condition for ceasing his mail-bomb campaign. Subsequently, The New York Times and The Washington Post published the manifesto, hoping somebody would recognize the writing style of the author.

David's wife, Linda Patrik, first suspected Ted and urged David to read the manifesto when it was published. David recognized Ted's writing style, and the criminal defense lawyer that the couple had hired, Anthony P. Bisceglie, notified authorities. On April 3, 1996, police arrested Ted in his rural cabin in Lincoln, Montana. David had received assurances from the FBI that his identity as the informant would be kept secret, but his name was leaked to the media. In addition, he sought a guarantee from federal prosecutors that Ted would receive appropriate psychiatric evaluation and treatment. The Justice Department's subsequent pursuit of the death penalty, and Attorney General Janet Reno's initial refusal to accept a plea bargain in exchange for a life sentence, was seen by David and other members of his family as a betrayal. Such a plea bargain was eventually reached, and Ted was sentenced to life imprisonment without possibility of parole. Kaczynski has since said that the decision to report his brother was painful but he felt morally compelled to do so as a way to prevent more victims.

David Kaczynski received a $1 million reward from the FBI for the Unabomber's capture. The reward was funded by a Congressional appropriation for the Justice Department and was, at the time, one of the largest rewards issued in a domestic case. In 1998, Kaczynski told the Associated Press that he planned to distribute the majority of the reward money to the bombing victims and their families, adding that this "might help us resolve our grief over what happened." Kaczynski went on to set up the Unabomb Survivors Fund, which donated $630,000 (after legal fees and taxes) to the victims of his brother's bombings.

=== Career ===
Prior to turning his brother Ted in to authorities, David Kaczynski worked as a social worker, serving as an assistant director of a shelter for runaway and homeless youth in Albany, New York, where he counseled and advocated for troubled, neglected, and abused youth. His brother's confrontation with the death penalty later motivated David Kaczynski to become an anti-death-penalty activist. In 2001, Kaczynski was named executive director of New Yorkers Against the Death Penalty (as of 2008, New Yorkers for Alternatives to the Death Penalty). While the mission of NYADP originally focused only on ending the death penalty, under Kaczynski's guidance in 2008, it broadened its mission to address the unmet needs of all those affected by violence, including victims and their families. After leaving the NYADP, Kaczynski served as executive director of Karma Triyana Dharmachakra, a Tibetan Buddhist monastery located in Woodstock, New York.

== Personal life ==
Kaczynski is married to Linda Patrik. He is a practicing Buddhist and a vegetarian. In 2009, he published an essay about his relationship with his brother Ted, from childhood to adulthood, which appeared in a collection of essays.

== In popular culture ==
Kaczynski appeared in the Netflix documentary Unabomber: In His Own Words (2020 TV mini-series). He was portrayed by Robert Hays in the 1996 television movie Unabomber: The True Story, and by Mark Duplass in the 2017 television series Manhunt: Unabomber. William Kosovic and Matthew Kevin Anderson portrayed Kaczynski at different points of his life in Netflix’s Unabomber that premiered in 2026.
