= Propaganda: The Formation of Men's Attitudes =

Book written by Jacques Ellul

- Propaganda: The Formation of Men's Attitudes
- Author: Jacques Ellul
- Translator: Konrad Kellen and Jean Lerner
- Language: English
- Publisher: Vintage Books
- Publication place: United States
- Pages: 320
- ISBN: 978-0-394-71874-3

Propaganda: The Formation of Men's Attitudes (1965/1973) (French: Propagandes; original French edition: 1962) is a book on the subject of propaganda by French philosopher, theologian, legal scholar, and sociologist Jacques Ellul. It presents a sophisticated taxonomy for propaganda, including such paired opposites as political–sociological, vertical–horizontal, rational–irrational, and agitation–integration. The book contains Ellul's theories about the nature of propaganda to adapt the individual to a society, to a living standard, and to an activity aiming to make the individual serve and conform.

== Author ==
After being discharged as a professor from French universities by the Vichy regime Ellul became a leader in the French resistance during World War II. After the Liberation of France, he became a professor at the University of Bordeaux and wrote 58 books and numerous articles over his lifetime, the dominant theme of which has been the threat to human freedom created by modern technology.

== Background history ==
As early as 1928, Edward Bernays recognized propaganda as a modern instrument to produce productive ends and "help bring order out of chaos". Because of its secrecy it has been difficult to determine what constitutes propaganda and what the nature of propaganda is. For a time from 1920 to around 1933, propaganda was simplistically viewed as being able to modify sentiments and attitudes of individuals without their being conscious. That limited perspective of propaganda as being able to influence the individual psychologically was prevalent.

The Institute for Propaganda Analysis from 1937, inspired by Harold Lasswell defined propaganda as "the expression of opinions or actions carried out deliberately by individuals or groups with a view to influencing the opinions or actions of other individuals or groups for predetermined ends and through psychological manipulations".

This definition seemed more accurate and was supported by others such as Goebbels, a German propagandist, who stated, "We do not talk to say something, but to obtain a certain effect". Similarly, F.C. Bartlett held an interpretation of the goal of propaganda as not merely an instrument to increase political understanding of events, but as a means to obtain results through action. Ellul supports the idea that propaganda is made primarily because of a will to action for the purpose of effectively arming policy made by the state.

Leonard Doob, an American specialist, defined propaganda in 1948 as "the attempt to affect the personalities and to control the behavior of individuals towards desired ends". Unending definitions show the uncertainty among specialists and the inability of definitions to encompass all that is propaganda. Just because the term propaganda cannot be defined with any degree of precision does not mean that attempts to define it should be abandoned. Ellul's definition in 1973 was as follows:

"Very frequently propaganda is described as a manipulation for the purpose of changing idea or opinions of making individuals 'believe' some idea or fact, and finally of making them adhere to some doctrine—all matters of the mind. It tries to convince, to bring about a decision, to create a firm adherence to some truth. This is a completely wrong line of thinking: to view propaganda as still being what it was in 1850 is to cling to an obsolete concept of man and of the means to influence him; it is to condemn oneself to understand nothing about propaganda. The aim of modern propaganda is no longer to modify ideas, but to provoke action. It is no longer to change adherence to a doctrine, but to make the individual cling irrationally to a process of action. It is no longer to transform an opinion but to arouse an active and mythical belief."

In this book Ellul but argued that modern propaganda was intended to spark action towards a desired response by developing learned attitudes, and that it drew from scientific analyses of psychology and sociology. Ellul took the view that prior attempts to define propaganda generally left out the sociological side.

== Summary of chapters ==
Propaganda: The Formation of Men's Attitudes is divided into five substantive chapters discussing Ellul's analysis.

- Introduction

Regardless of the State, propaganda should be viewed as situated at the center of the growing powers of governmental and administrative techniques.

"Differences in political regimes matter little; differences in social levels are more important; and most important is national self-awareness. Propaganda is a good deal less the political weapon of a regime (it is that also) than the effect of a technological society that embraces the entire man and tends to be a completely integrated society. Propaganda stops man from feeling that things in society are oppressive and persuades him to submit with good grace."

- Chapter One: Characteristics of Propaganda

Modern propaganda is a technique that requires an analysis of both environment and individual to be subjected to propaganda. Therefore, it is based on scientific analyses of psychology and sociology. Sufficient understanding of these two areas creates the most effective propaganda, and without the scientific research of modern psychology and sociology there would be no propaganda. "Step by step the propagandist builds the techniques on the basis of his knowledge of man, his tendencies, his desires, his needs, his psychic mechanisms, his conditioning, and as much on social psychology as on depth psychology."

1. Part One: External Characteristics

Propaganda is first and foremost concerned with influencing an individual psychologically by creating convictions and compliance through imperceptible techniques that are effective only by continuous repetition. Propaganda employs encirclement on the individual by trying to surround man by all possible routes, in the realm of feelings as well as ideas, by playing on his will or his needs through his conscious and his unconscious, and by assailing him in both his private and his public life. The propagandist also acknowledges the most favorable moment to influence man is when an individual is caught up in the masses. Propaganda must be total in that utilizes all forms of media to draw the individual into the net of propaganda. Propaganda is designed to be continuous within the individual's life by filling the citizen's entire day. It is based on slow constant impregnation that functions over a long period of time exceeding the individual's capacities for attention or adaptation and thus his capabilities of resistance. In order for propaganda to maintain encirclement, it must be exerted by an organization capable of influencing psychological channels that reach the individual. Psychological and physical actions are inseparable elements to propaganda, however, if no influence is exerted by an organization then there can be no propaganda because it cannot operate in a vacuum. The necessity for a physical organization limits propaganda enterprises and in order to be effective propaganda must work inside a group, principally inside a nation. Propaganda must first organize the masses in order to propagandize within the masses. In general, propaganda is a set of methods employed by an organized group that wants to bring about the active or passive participation in its actions of a mass of individuals, psychologically unified through psychological manipulations and incorporated into an organization. Propaganda should no longer be viewed in terms of an orthodoxy but rather modern propaganda should be seen as an orthopraxy because it aims for participation not adherence. Participation can be active or passive: active if propaganda has been able to mobilize the individual for action; passive if the individual does not act directly but psychologically supports that action.

2. Part Two: Internal Characteristics

The second major element that a propagandist must understand is the environment in which the individual operates, mainly the focus on the interest of the public. An understanding of the conventional patterns and stereotypes that pre-exist in a milieu provide the propagandist with material from which to build off. Propaganda is not able to create something out of nothing and is confined to developing pre-existing material thereby expressing the fundamental currents of the society it seeks to influence. These currents include accepted structures such as collective sociological presuppositions and myths that are fundamental to society.

"The Four Great Collective Sociological Presuppositions in the Modern World:

1. That an individual's aim in life is happiness.
2. That man is naturally good.
3. That history develops in endless progress.
4. That everything is matter.

The Collective Myths:

1. of Work
2. of Happiness
3. of the Nation
4. of Youth
5. of the Hero"

These currents reinforce society and hold man's major convictions and propaganda must voice this reality. Propaganda is concerned with timeliness since an individual is only moved to action if he is pushed towards a timely one by propaganda. Once it becomes history it inevitably becomes neutral and indifferent to the individual who is sensitive primarily to current news. "Operational words" are used to penetrate an individual's indifference. However they lose their value as immediacy passes as old facts are replaced by new ones. The "current events man" is carried along the current of news and caught in the events of today, losing interest in the events of yesterday. The indifferent are apolitical and without opinion, therefore they are outside of propaganda's grasp. Incidentally, there are also the undecided, people whose opinions are vague, who form the majority of citizens within the collective. These citizens are the most susceptible to control of public opinion that is dictated by propaganda. Lastly, this part discusses propaganda and truth or the ability of propaganda to relay something as true based not on the accuracy of facts but of reality. Propaganda veils the truth with falsehoods even though lying is generally to be avoided.

3. Part Three: Categories of Propaganda

Presented in this chapter is a sophisticated taxonomy for propaganda, including such paired opposites as political-sociological, vertical-horizontal, rational-irrational, and agitation-integration.

Political vs. Sociological Propaganda: Political Propaganda involves techniques of influence employed by a government, a party, an administration, or a pressure group with the intention of changing the behavior of the public. The themes and objectives of this type of propaganda are of a political nature. The goals are determined by the government, party, administration, or pressure group. The methods of political propaganda are calculated in a precise manner and its main criterion is to disseminate an ideology for the very purpose of making various political acts acceptable to the people. There are two forms of political propaganda, tactical and strategic. Tactical political propaganda seeks to obtain immediate results within a given framework. Strategic political propaganda is not concerned with speed but rather it establishes the general line, the array of arguments, and the staging of campaigns.

Political propaganda reversed is sociological propaganda because the ideology is penetrated by means of its sociological context. Propaganda, as it is traditionally known, implies an attempt to spread an ideology through the mass media of communication in order to lead the public to a desired action. In sociological propaganda even media that are not controllable such as individual art work, films, and writing reflect the ideology allowing for an accelerated penetration of the masses and the individuals within them.

Sociological propaganda is a phenomenon where a society seeks to integrate the maximum number of individuals into itself by unifying its members' behavior according to a pattern, spreading its style of life abroad, and thus imposing itself on other groups. Essentially sociological propaganda aims to increase conformity with the environment that is of a collective nature by developing compliance with or defense of the established order through long term penetration and progressive adaptation by using all social currents. The propaganda element is the way of life with which the individual is permeated and then the individual begins to express it in film, writing, or art without realizing it. This involuntary behavior creates an expansion of society through advertising, the movies, education, and magazines. "The entire group, consciously or not, expresses itself in this fashion; and to indicate, secondly that its influence aims much more at an entire style of life." This type of propaganda is not deliberate but springs up spontaneously or unwittingly within a culture or nation. This propaganda reinforces the individual's way of life and represents this way of life as best. Sociological propaganda creates an indisputable criterion for the individual to make judgments of good and evil according to the order of the individual's way of life. Sociological propaganda does not result in action, however, it can prepare the ground for direct propaganda. From then on, the individual in the clutches of such sociological propaganda believes that those who live this way are on the side of the angels, and those who don't are bad.

Vertical vs. Horizontal Propaganda: Vertical propaganda is similar to direct propaganda that aims at the individual in the mass and is renewed constantly. However, in horizontal propaganda there is no top down structure but rather it springs up from within the group. It involves meticulous encirclement that traps an individual involuntarily in dialectic. The individual is led unfailingly to its adherence by talking about the dialectic until the individual discovers the answer that was set up unconsciously for him to find. Schools are a primary mechanism for integrating the individual into the way of life.

Rational vs. Irrational Propaganda: Propaganda is addressed to the individual on the foundation of feelings and passions which are irrational, however, the content of propaganda does address reason and experience when it presents information and furnishes facts making it rational as well. It is important for propaganda to be rational because modern man needs relation to facts. Modern man wants to be convinced that by acting in a certain way he is obeying reason in order to have self-justification. The challenge is creating an irrational response on the basis of rational and factual elements by leaving an impression on an individual that remains long after the facts have faded away. Individuals are not compelled to act based facts but rather on emotional pressure, the vision of the future, or the myth.

Agitation vs. Integration propaganda: Propaganda of agitation seeks to mobilize people in order to destroy the established order and/or government. It seeks rebellion by provoking a crisis or unleashing explosive movements during one. It momentarily subverts the habits, customs, and beliefs that were obstacles to making great leap forward by addressing the internal elements in each of us. It eradicates the individual out of his normal framework and then proceeds to plunge him into enthusiasm by suggesting extraordinary goals which nevertheless seem to him completely within reach. However, this enthusiasm can only last a short duration so the objective must be achieved quickly followed by a period of rest. People cannot be kept in a "state of perpetual enthusiasm and insecurity". Rebellion is incited by the propagandist who knows that hate is one of the most profitable resources when drawn out of an individual. Agitation propaganda is usually thought of as propaganda in that it aims to influence people to act. Integration propaganda, on the other hand, is a more subtle form that aims to reinforce cultural norms. This is sociological in nature because it provides stability to society by supporting the "way of life" and the myths within a culture. It is propaganda of conformity that requires participation in the social body. This type of propaganda is more prominent and permanent, yet it is not as recognized as agitation propaganda because it is more permanent manner. Basically, agitation propaganda provides the motive force when needed and when not needed integration propaganda provides the context and backdrop.

- Chapter Two: The Condition for the Existence of Propaganda

The nature of propaganda has changed over the course of time and yet it is evident that propaganda cannot exist without a milieu. The emergence of propaganda is interconnected with technology and scientific discoveries yet it can only appear and grow under certain conditions. Several events have occurred that have furthered propaganda by increasing its ability in depth and discovering new methods. Modern propaganda could not exist without the mass media or modern means of transportation which permit crowds of diverse individuals from all over to assemble easily and frequently.

1. Part One: The Sociological Conditions

Society must contain elements of both an individualist society and a mass society. Propaganda aims to capture both the mass and the individual at the same time through this dual type of society. A mass society is based on individuals that are reduced to ciphers based on what they have in common to others. First conditions for growth and development of modern propaganda: it emerged in Western Europe in the nineteenth century and the first half of the twentieth precisely because that was when society was becoming increasingly individualistic and its organic structures were breaking down. Individuals without natural organic local groups are defenseless and more likely to be caught up in a social current. On the other hand, a mass society has considerable population density in which local structures and organizations are weak, currents of opinion are strongly felt creating a certain psychological unity, and individuals are organized into large and influential collectives. Mass society is characterized by uniformity and material life despite differences of environment. Once a mass society is created, public opinion will begin to play a role to help individuals form their own personal opinion. Public opinion can only express itself through channels which are provided by the mass media of communication without which there could be no propaganda. Yet it is important that mass media be subject to centralized control in order to successfully form public opinion without any opposition. Again Ellul mentions that the individual must be caught in wide net of media through all channels. Once opinion has been formed, propaganda is able to reinforce it and transform opinion into action.

2. Part Two: Objective Conditions of Total Propaganda

Propaganda thrives off of what individuals have in common with others to develop patterns of behavior and modify cultural opinions. Total propaganda recognizes that within a nation individuals should all have in common a standard of living, a culture, and an ideology. The need of an average standard of living is that people must be able to afford to buy a radio, TV, a newspaper, or go to the movies. It is mostly concerned with the densest mass which is made up of average men and not the very rich or very poor. Poor cannot do this therefore they cannot be subjected to integration propaganda because the immediate concerns of daily life absorb all their capacities and efforts. The poor can only be subjected to agitation propaganda, excited to the point of theft and murder. But they cannot be trained by propaganda, kept in hand, channeled, and oriented. More advanced propaganda can influence only a man who is not completely haunted by poverty, a man who can view things from a certain distance and be reasonably unconcerned about his daily bread, who therefore can take an interest in more general matters.

"For propaganda to be effective the propagandee must have a certain store of ideas and a number of conditioned reflexes that can only be acquired through peace of mind springing from relative security. The establishment of a mode of common life—all this leads to the creation of a type of normal man conveniently leads all men toward that norm via a multitude of paths. Propaganda's intent is to integrate people into the normal pattern prevailing in society bring about conformance to way of life. To sum up: The creation of normalcy in our society can take one of two shapes. It can be the result of scientific, psycho-sociological analysis based on statistics—that is the American type of normalcy. It can be ideological and doctrinaire—that is the Communist type. But the results are identical: such normalcy necessarily gives rise to propaganda that can reduce the individual to the pattern most useful to society."

"Information" Is an essential element of propaganda, which must "have reference to political or economic reality" to be credible. In fact, no propaganda can work until the moment when a set of facts has become a problem in the eyes of those who constitute public opinion." Education permits the dissemination of propaganda in that it enables people to consume information. Information is indistinguishable from propaganda in that information is an essential element of propaganda because for propaganda to succeed it must have reference to political or economic reality. Propaganda grafts itself onto an already existing reality through "informed opinion". Where no informed opinion with regard to political or economic affairs propaganda cannot exist making it an indispensable aspect. Propaganda means nothing without preliminary information that provides the basis for propaganda, gives propaganda the means to operate, and generates the problems that propaganda exploits by pretending to offer solutions. It is through information that the individual is placed in a social context and learns to understand the reality of his own situation. Information allows us to evaluate our situation feel our own personal problems are a general social problem thus enabling propaganda to entice us into social and political action. Information is most effective when it is objective and broad because it creates a general picture. With information quantity is better than quality, the more political or economic facts believed to be mastered by an individual, the more sensitive their judgment is to propaganda. In fact, only in and through propaganda do the masses have access to political economy, politics, art, or literature. The more stereotypes in a culture, the easier it is to form public opinion, and the more an individual participates in that culture, the more susceptible he becomes to the manipulation of these symbols.

- Chapter Three: The Necessity for Propaganda

All propaganda is based on a need, a dual need, first there is the need of state to make it and second there is the need of propagandee to receive it. These two needs compliment and correspond to each other in the development of propaganda. Propaganda is an expression of modern society as a whole.

1. Part One: The State's Necessity

The State has the need to make propaganda to integrate citizens into its society, to disseminate information, and to increase participation and involvement of members of society. Sometimes the people want to take part in government affairs. However, the official leaders cannot disconnect themselves from what the people want. Being that the people in charge can't escape the people, bait must be presented to them. This acts as a disguise that must be there to hide what is really happening behind the scenes in the government. Citizens are aware that political decisions affect everybody and governments cannot govern without the support, presence, pressure, or knowledge of the people. Yet the people are incapable of making long term policy so opinion must be created to follow the government because the government cannot be led by opinion. All of this describes the "Mass-Government" relationship characterized by people demanding what has already been decided, in order to appear as though the government is actually caring about what the people need. The next part that the book discusses is psychological warfare. It is believed to be a peace policy that is used between nations as a form of aggression. This type of propaganda changes the public opinion of an opposing regime so that it can be in favor of their regime.

2. Part Two: The Individual's Necessity

The individual needs propaganda to gain satisfaction as a member of society. Individuals want to be informed and to participate in the decisions of the state. Propaganda is the outlet through which individuals obtain the satisfaction of having contributed to the state. It is a necessary instrument of a state or institution to spread information to members of the group or society. But for propaganda to succeed it must respond to a need on the individual's part as well. The individual is by no means just an innocent victim of propaganda when in fact he provokes the psychological action of propaganda by not merely lending himself to it, but also from deriving satisfaction from it. It is strictly a sociological phenomenon, in the sense that it has its roots and reasons in the need of the group that will sustain it. The great role performed by propaganda is in its ability to give the people the involvement they crave or the illusion of it in order for the masses to be artificially satisfied. Individuals are faced with decisions which require a range of information that the individual does not and cannot have without propaganda. Thus, the individual is unable to accept that he cannot form opinion on his own and is caught between his desire and his inability. People are willing and likely to accept propaganda that allows them to artificially satisfy their desire to have an opinion by hiding their incompetence. The individual does not mind being given preconceived positions because otherwise he would realize that he does not understand the problems of the modern world. The individual would then realize that he "depends on situations of which he has no control" and have to face this reality. The individual cannot live in the state of this harsh reality so he derives satisfaction from the veil created by the ideology and the sense of values it provides. The individual need psychological and ideological reasons why he needs to be where he is and propaganda is the mechanism that the state uses for this very purpose.

- Chapter Four: Psychological Effects of Propaganda

The psychological effects of propaganda on an individual cannot be ignored. The individual undergoes profound changes while being propagandized mainly the diminishment of personal activity. "Propaganda furnishes objectives, organizes the traits of an individual into a system, and freezes them into a mold by standardizing current ideas, hardening the prevailing stereotypes, and furnishing thought patterns in all areas." The individual is traumatized by the overwhelming force of propaganda that intensifies the prejudices and beliefs until eventually the individual has no control over his own impulses. It seeks to push the individual into the mass until his will fades entirely into that of the mass. Individuality is sacrificed for the greater cause of the nation by uniting him and blending him with others. Critical and personal judgment are subdued and replaced with ready-made attitudes and opinions. Discernment is made nearly impossible for the individual whose ability to judge is destroyed making him dependent on propaganda's ready-made opinions from then on. The individual can no longer exercise his own judgment and becomes honed into what propaganda tells him. He no longer expresses himself but his group once he accepts public opinion as his own. The artificial, impersonal public opinion created by propaganda is absorbed by the individual and he becomes filled with its conviction. When he is fully integrated in the social group and can no longer distinguish between himself and society than he has reached total alienation. In this process, the individual's personal inclinations lead to participation in the collective where he loses control and submits to external impulses. The individual is suppressed psychologically so that he can continue to live under the conditions in which society places him by providing an artificial and unreal reality that is the result of powerful propaganda.

- Chapter Five: The Socio-Political Effects

"In the nineteenth century, the problem of opinion formation through the expression of thought was essentially a problem of contacts between the State and the individual, and a problem of acquisition of freedom. But today, thanks to the mass media, the individual finds himself outside the battle that is now between the State and powerful groups. The freedom to express ideas is no longer at stake in this debate but it has been replaced by mastery and domination by the State or some powerful groups over the formation of opinion. The individual is not in the battle because he is the stake and the battle will determine what voice he will be permitted to hear and which words will have the power to obsess him."

1. Part One: Propaganda and Ideology

An ideology provides society certain beliefs and no social group can exist without the foundation of these beliefs. Propaganda is the means by which an ideology can expand without force. An ideology is either fortified within a group or expanded beyond the borders of a group through propaganda. However, propaganda is less and less concerned with spreading the ideology nowadays as it is with becoming autonomous. The ideology is no longer the decisive factor of propaganda that must be obeyed by the propagandist. The propagandist cannot be constrained by the ideology of his State but must operate in service of the state and be able to manipulate the ideology as if it were an object. The ideology merely provides the content for the propagandist to build off since he is limited to what already is present within the group, nation, or society. The fundamental ideologies are nationalism, socialism, communism, and democracy.

2. Part Two: Effects on the Structure of Public Opinion

Public opinion is an instrument of propaganda that is disseminated through the mass media of communication to the masses. While most people view the formation of public opinion as being shaped itself by interaction between different viewpoints on controversial questions, this is incorrect because public opinion is delineated by propaganda as a "truth" which is either believed or not believed. Public opinion ceases to be controversial and can no longer form itself except through channels of mass media. No opinion can be held until it is communicated to the masses through mass media. Propaganda uses public opinion to externalize inner opinions of the organization to the masses that eventually produces conformity.

3. Part Three: Propaganda and Grouping

In regards to propaganda, there are two groups: the groups that make propaganda and the groups that are subjected to propaganda. In Ellul's view, there is a "double foray on the part of propaganda that proves the excellence of one group and the evilness of another at the same time to create partitioning". This creates isolation between groups by promoting allegiance to the group one is in and suppressing conversation between groups. The more they listen to their propaganda the stronger their beliefs and the greater their justifications for their actions. Partitioning takes place on many different levels including class, religious, political, national and blocs of nations. A superior group is able to affect the lesser groups, however, groups that have an equal amount of influence will only separate further from one another in that a members allegiance to a group develops closed mindedness. Well-organized propaganda is able to work with different elements that exist within a nation such as religion, political parties, and labor groups.

4. Part Four: Propaganda and Democracy

Since democracy depends on public opinion, it is clear that propaganda must be involved. The relationship between democracy and propaganda evidently presents a conflict between the principles of democracy and the processes of propaganda. The individual is viewed as the cornerstone of a democracy which is a form of government that is made "for the people and by the people". However, as discussed in early chapters Ellul described the masses are incapable of making long-term foreign policy and the government needs to make these decisions in a timely manner. This is where propaganda comes into play and projects an artificial reality to the masses to satisfy their need to participate in government while the decisions are really made behind the scenes. This was also describe earlier as the "mass-government" relationship. Democratic regimes develop propaganda in line with its myths and prejudices. Propaganda stresses the superiority of a democratic society while intensifying the prejudices between democratic and oppressive.

== Major themes ==
Propaganda: The Formation of Men's Attitudes builds on prior notions of propaganda to demonstrate that while propaganda is psychological in nature it is just as much sociological in nature as well. Propaganda is not just embedded into the individual's psyche but also the cultural psyche. Propaganda works off the inner characteristics of both the individual and the society that the individual belongs. This thorough analysis made by Ellul illustrates that to downplay the importance of the sociological influences of propaganda to psychological ones is a dreadful error. Propaganda is more threatening when it begins to be recognized as sociological as well psychological in nature. Below are two major themes the first stressing the psychological aims of propaganda the second the sociological aims.

=== "The Lonely Crowd" ===
The "lonely crowd" is used by Ellul to distinguish the two inseparable elements of propaganda, the individual and the masses, which must be addressed by the propagandist at the same time. As an isolated unit, the individual is of no interest to the propagandist unless he is reduced to an average. It is crucial that the individual is never considered as an individual but always in terms of what he has in common with others. The individual is included and integrated into the mass because the propagandist profits from the process of diffusion of emotions through the mass, and at the same time, from the pressures felt by an individual when in a group.

In this setting, "the individual caught up in the mass", the individual's reactions are easier to provoke and psychological defenses are weakened. The individual must always be considered as a participant in a mass and similarly the mass must only be viewed as a crowd composed of individuals. When propaganda is addressed to the crowd, it must touch each individual in that crowd which is in fact nothing but assembled individuals. Conversely, the individual should not be viewed as alone as a listener, watcher, or reader because the individual is nevertheless part of an invisible crowd though he is actually alone. The most favorable moment to influence an individual is when he is alone in the mass, the structure of the mass is extremely profitable to the propagandist concerned with being effective.

=== Fundamental currents in society ===
"One cannot make just any propaganda any place for anybody." While propaganda is focused on reaching the individual, it cannot only rely on building off what already exists in the individual. Propaganda must also attach itself to the pre-existing fundamental currents of the society it seeks to influence. The propagandist must know the current tendencies and the stereotypes among the public he is trying to reach. These are indicated by principal symbols of the culture the propagandist wishes to attack since these symbols express the attitudes of a particular culture. Individuals are part of a culture and are therefore psychologically shaped by that culture. The main task of propaganda is to utilize the conditioned symbols as transmitters of that culture to serve its purpose. Propaganda must be a reflection of the fundamental structures of society to be successful and not contradictory of existing opinions. A skillful propagandist does not try to change mass opinion or go against an accepted structure. Only a bad propagandist would make a direct attack on an established, reasoned, durable opinion, accepted cliché, or fixed pattern. "Each individual harbors a large number of stereotypes and established tendencies; from this arsenal the propagandist must select those easiest to mobilize, those which will give the greatest strength to the action he wants to precipitate."

While propaganda cannot create something out of nothing, it does have the ability to build on the foundation already established. More importantly even though it does not create new material and is confined to what already exists, it is not necessarily powerless. "It can attack from the rear, war own slowly, provide new centers of interest, which cause the neglect of previously acquired positions; it can divert a prejudice; or it can elicit an action contrary to an opinion held by the individual without his being clearly aware of it."

Propaganda can gradually undermine prejudices and images in order to weaken them. These fundamental currents in society create the perfect atmosphere for sociological propaganda which influences the individual through his customs and unconscious habits. Sociological propaganda is a phenomenon where a society tries to unify its members' behavior according to a pattern. Essentially sociological propaganda is to increase conformity with the environment that is of a collective nature by developing compliance with or defense of the established order through long term penetration and progressive adaptation by using all social currents. The propaganda element is the way of life with which the individual is permeated and then the individual begins to express it in film, writing, or art without realizing it. This involuntary behavior creates an expansion of society through advertising, the movies, education, and magazines. "The entire group, consciously or not, expresses itself in this fashion; and to indicate, secondly that its influence aims much more at an entire style of life." This type of propaganda is not deliberate but springs up spontaneously or unwittingly within a culture or nation. This propaganda reinforces the individual's way of life and represents this way of life as best.

== See also ==
- Conformity
- Ideology
- Indoctrination
- Media manipulation
- Propaganda
- Psychological manipulation
- Social Influence
- Socially constructed reality
