= Bernard Charbonneau =

French philosopher

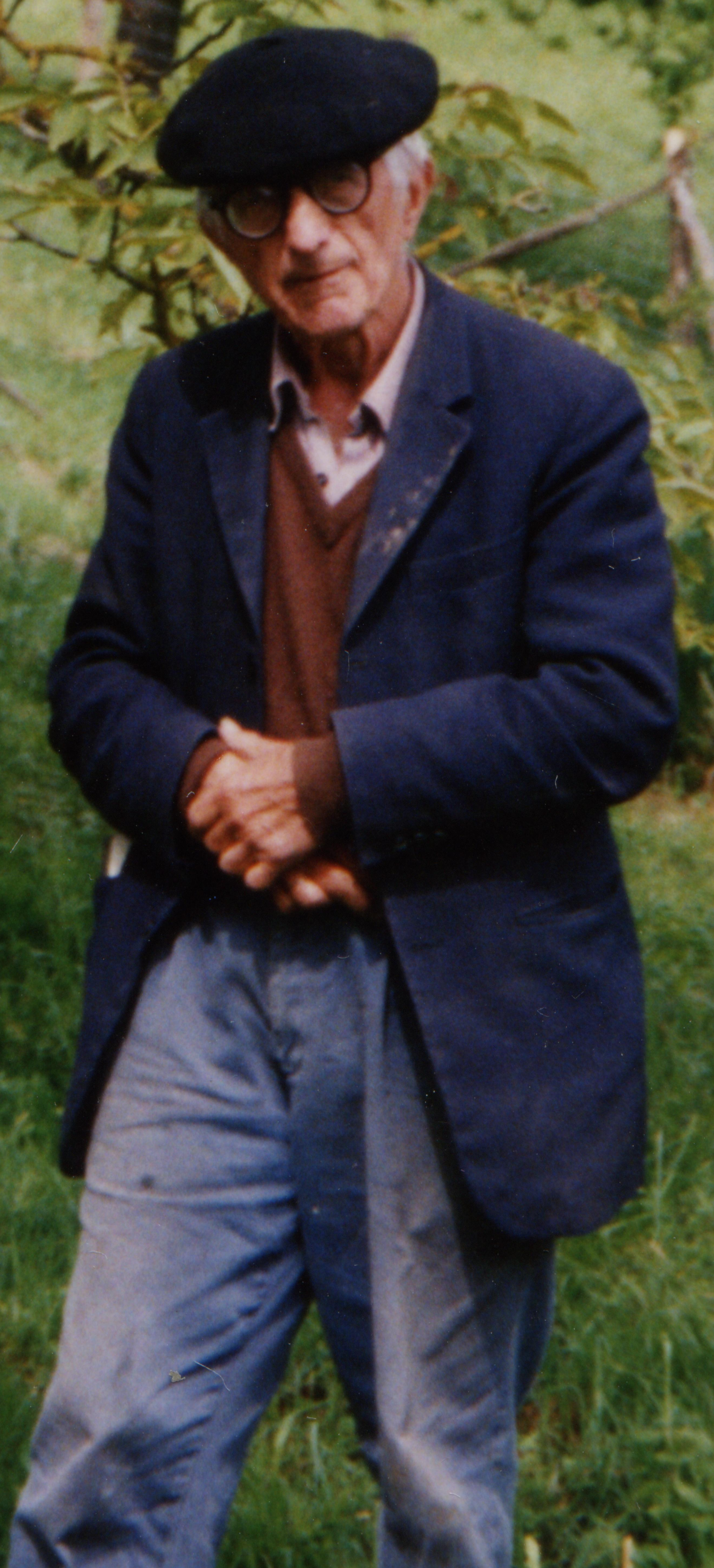
- Bernard Charbonneau on his land in Saint-Pé-de-Léren in 1994
- Born: November 28, 1910; Bordeaux, France
- Died: April 28, 1996; Saint-Palais, Pyrénées-Atlantiques
- Occupations: Teacher, writer
- Notable work: l'Etat, Je Fus

Bernard Charbonneau (November 28, 1910 – April 28, 1996) was a French writer who wrote about twenty books and numerous articles, published in La Gueule Ouverte, Foi et Vie, La République des Pyrénées. An apolitical and independent thinker, he is considered to be a major inspiration for various French ecological movements. His name is regularly mentioned by French academics. as well French green party leaders.

The underlying idea inspiring his books and articles is that "the link that attaches individual persons to society is so strong that, even in the so called 'individualistic society', people struggle to exercise the critical thinking needed to resist mass trends, and end up readily consenting to the annihilation of what they cherish most: their freedom".

In the 1930s, he associated economic development with a form of dictatorship and came to be recognized as a pioneer in political ecology. Sceptical of all forms of partisanship, including partisanship in the area of ecology, he laid out the foundation of a new type of society based on personal experience, in rupture with most accepted ideologies of the 20th century. He shared many of the personalist views of his friend of sixty years Jacques Ellul regarding technological progress, which both men regarded as a source of conformism and a threat to freedom.

== Biography ==
Charbonneau was born in Bordeaux in 1910 to a middle-class family from the French department of Lot et Garonne. His father was Protestant and his mother Catholic. Life in a large city quickly made Young Charbonneau feel oppressed. On his own admission, he was an average student. He obtained a baccalaureat in French literature and attended the University of Bordeaux to study history and geography. He embarked on a career of teaching at the age of twenty-four and obtained his teaching certificate in the following year.

At the end of World War II, he left city life to settle in the countryside, skipping the opportunity to further his academic achievements in a large city. He accepted a teaching position in a higher education establishment ("École Normale") in Lescar, near Pau, in the Pre-Pyrenees (currently Lycee Jacques Monod) where he worked until his retirement. He produced a strong impression on his students. He enjoyed the proximity to nature and lived a spartan life near the Gaves de Pau then Oloron.

Charbonneau died in 1996 of liver cancer in the hospital of Saint Palais. He is buried on his property in "Le Boucau" in Saint-Pé-de-Léren. On his grave is the quotation from the book of Ruth: "wherever you go, I'll go; wherever you stay, I'll stay and your God will be my God." After his death, his wife, Henriette Louise Daudin, had his unpublished writing published. She died of cardiac arrest in December 2015.

Charbonneau had four children: Simone, Juliette, Catherine and Martine.

In 2006, the personal archives of Charbonneau were transferred to the library of the Institut d'études politiques de Bordeaux.

== Thoughts and life achievements ==
Charbonneau started various discussion groups, some with Jacques Ellul who was his friend for his entire life, with the aim of talking and thinking about the changes resulting from scientific and technical progress. "As young adults, Ellul and his friend Charbonneau already had the intuition of what would be the architecture of their entire works. Their works were parallel if not common. If, unlike Ellul's, Charbonneau's work was not fully known to the public at the time, Ellul knew exactly how much he owed to Charbonneau. Ellul admits that without his friend, who was a genius and taught him how to think, he would never have understood the technical society phenomenon" explains Patrick Troude-Chastenet".

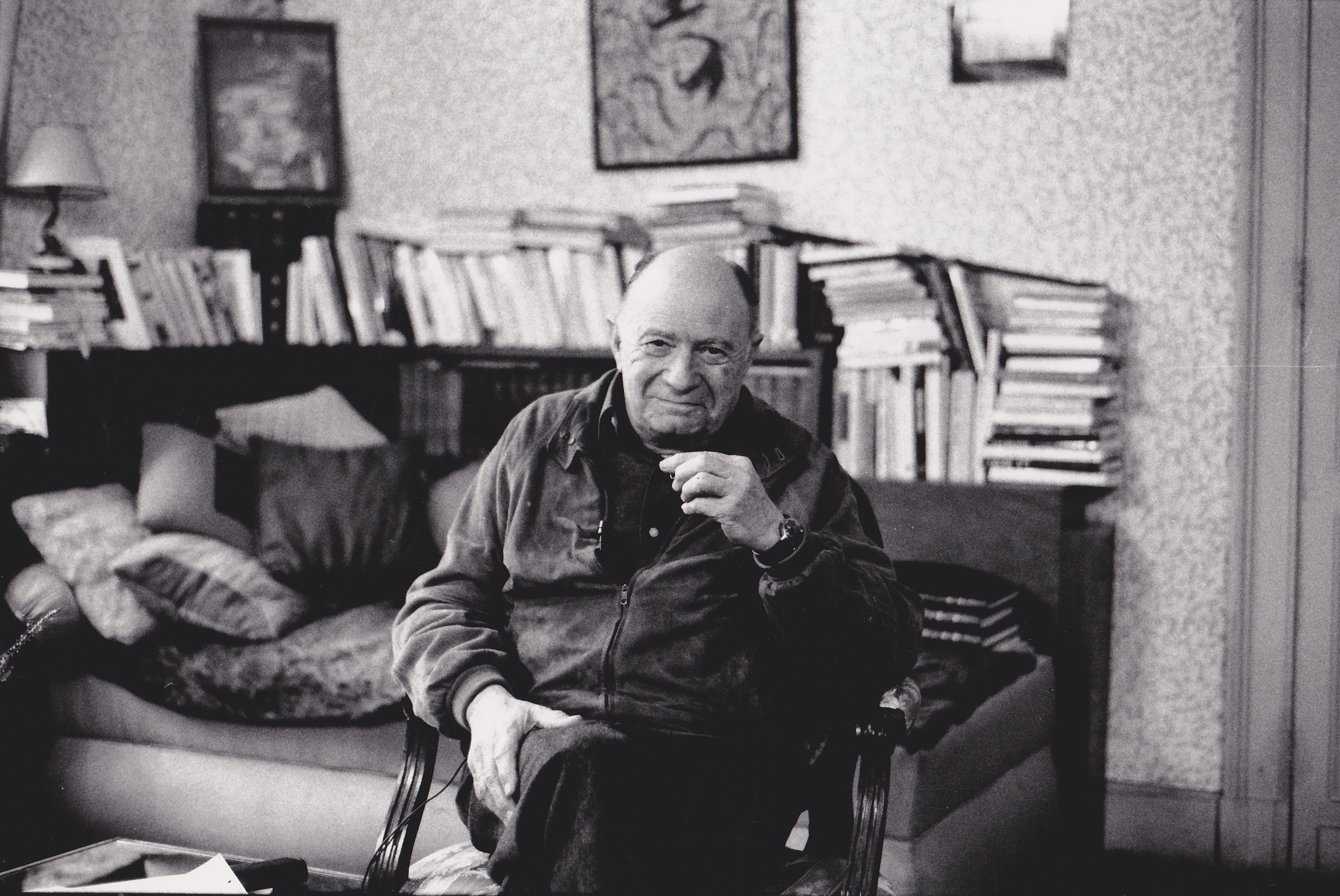
Jacques Ellul, friend of Charbonneau for 60 years

Following the creation by Emmanuel Mounier of the magazine Esprit in 1932, Charbonneau decided to join the French personalist movement and renamed his group "le groupe personaliste du Sud-Ouest". Charbonneau was careful about not confining his group in pure theories but making it experience personalism in practice. He took his friends in long hikes in Galicia, the Canary Islands, in the Spanish Pyrenees as well as in the Aspe valley and in Saint-Pé-de-Léren.

Between 1940 and 1947, Charbonneau designed the structure of his work and wrote a voluminous book, entitled Par la force des choses, whose content announced the twenty or so books that would follow. His analysis of the contradictions in the world led to the anticipation of something worse than political totalitarianism: social totalitarianism resulting from unstoppable technological progress. Based on the analysis of the social and political evolution which he witnessed in the 1930s and 1940s, he was able to anticipate issues that were later recognized as crucial in society. He noted the problems resulting from ever more technocratic social, political and ecological spheres, from State propaganda and mass communication, from the move from fine art to entertainment and consumerism and from the liquidation of traditional farming, among other factors. He was not in a position to communicate his thoughts as a whole and therefore tried to expose it in details in separate books. His books l'Etat and Je fus are the two major cornerstones of his work, previously announced in Par la force des choses. He could not find any editors to publish them so he used a spirit duplicator to distribute copies to a close circle of friends. Those two books would eventually be published some 50 years later. Charbonneau resumed the analysis of the industrial society that he had started before the war with a book named Pan se meurt but once again, failed to find an editor. It was 20 years before Editions Gallimard published his book, with a new title: Le Jardin de Babylone. His analysis of the chaotic effects of technological and industrial progress were published in 1973 with the title Le système et le chaos. His thoughts on the contradictions of the liberal conception of freedom were published in 2002 with the title Prométhée réenchaîné. Patrick Chastenet dedicated a chapter and a book to his work.

== Bibliography ==
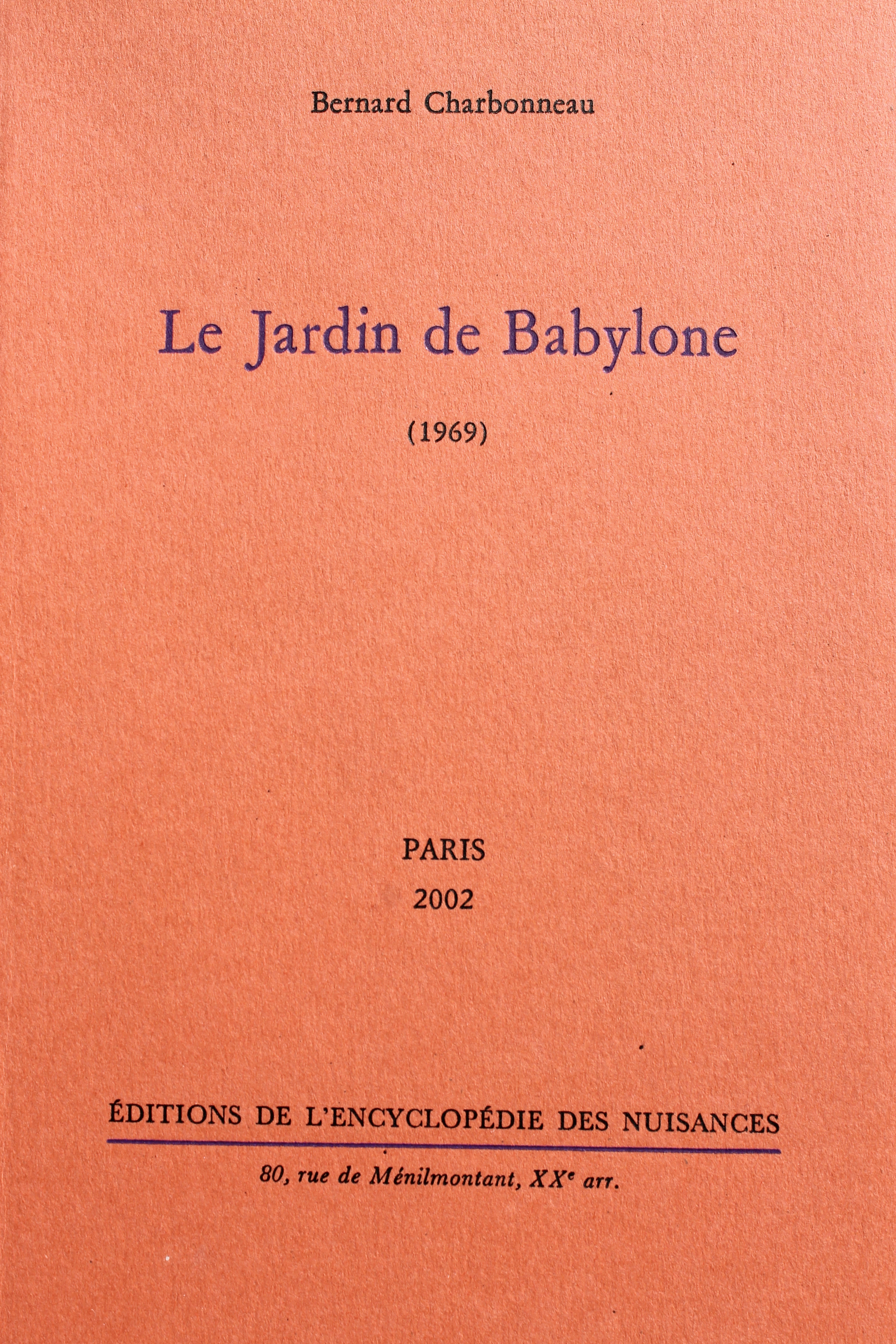
Le Jardin de Babylone

=== Books published prior to Charbonneau's death ===
- L’État, édition ronéotypée (à compte d'auteur), 1949. Economica, Paris, 1987. Réimpression 1999 ISBN 978-2-7178-1360-9
- Teilhard de Chardin, prophète d'un âge totalitaire, éditions Denoël, Paris, 1963 ISBN 2207203069 (épuisé)
- Le Paradoxe de la culture, Denoël, Paris, 1965. Réédité en 1991 dans Nuit et jour
- Célébration du coq, Éditions Robert Morel, Haute-Provence, 1966 (épuisé)
- Dimanche et lundi, Denoël, Paris, 1966 ISBN 2207203085 (épuisé)
- L'Hommauto, Denoël, Paris, 1967. Réédité en 2003 chez le même éditeur ISBN 978-2-2072-5549-0
- Le Fils de l'Homme et les enfants de Dieu, édition ronéotypée (à compte d'auteur), 1968.
- Le Jardin de Babylone, Gallimard, Paris, 1969. Éditions de l'Encyclopédie des Nuisances, 2002 ISBN 978-2-9103-8618-4
- Prométhée réenchaîné édition ronéotypée (à compte d'auteur), 1972. Éditions de La Table Ronde, Paris, 2001 ISBN 978-2-7103-2445-4
- Le Système et le chaos. Critique du développement exponentiel, Anthropos, Paris, 1973. 2^{e} édition : Economica, Paris, 1990 ISBN 978-2-7178-1837-6. 3^{e} édition : Médial éditions, novembre 2012 ISBN 978-2-8473-0022-2.
- Tristes campagnes, Denoël, Paris, 1973 ISBN 979-10-92605-00-6. Réédition chez Le Pas de côté en 2013 ISBN 979-10-92605-00-6.
- Notre table rase, Denoël, Paris, 1974
- Vu d'un finisterre, édition ronéotypée (à compte d'auteur), 1976
- Le plus et le moins, édition ronéotypée (à compte d'auteur), 1978
- Le Feu vert, Karthala, Paris, 1980. Parangon, Lyon, 2009. ISBN 978-2-8419-0182-1 trans. The Green Light: a self-critique of the ecological movement, Bloomsbury, 2018.
- Je fus. Essai sur la liberté, Imprimerie Marrimpouey, Pau, 1980. Opales, Bordeaux, 2000 ISBN 978-2-9087-9949-1
- Une seconde nature, édité à compte d'auteur, Imprimerie Marrimpouey, Pau, 1981. Médial éditions, novembre 2012. ISBN 978-2-8473-0023-9
- La propriété c'est l'envol, édition ronéotypée (à compte d'auteur), 1984
- La société médiatisée, édition ronéotypée (à compte d'auteur), 1985
- Ultima Ratio, édition ronéotypée (à compte d'auteur), 1986. Édité en 1991 dans Nuit et jour
- Nuit et jour, (compilation de Le paradoxe de la culture et Ultima ratio) Economica, Paris, 1991 ISBN 978-2-7178-2183-3
- Sauver nos régions, Le Sang de la Terre, Paris, 1991 ISBN 978-2-8698-5051-4
- L'esprit court les rues, édition ronéotypée (à compte d'auteur), 1992
- Les chemins de la liberté, édition ronéotypée (à compte d'auteur), 1994

=== Books published after Charbonneau's death ===
- Il court, il court le fric…, Opales, Bordeaux, 1996 ISBN 978-2-8698-5037-8
- Un Festin pour Tantale, Le Sang de la Terre, Paris, 1996. Réédité en 2001 ISBN 978-2-9087-9926-2
- Comment ne pas penser, Opales, Bordeaux, 2004 ISBN 978-2-9087-9926-2
- Bien aimer sa maman, Opales, Bordeaux, 2006 ISBN 978-2-9087-9978-1
- Finis Terrae, À plus d'un titre, 2010 ISBN 978-2-9174-8610-8
- Le Changement, Le Pas de côté, 2013 ISBN 979-10-92605-01-3
- Nous sommes révolutionnaires malgré nous. Textes pionniers de l'écologie politique (avec Jacques Ellul). Recueil de quatre textes datant des années 1930. Le Seuil, 2014 ISBN 978-2-0211-6302-5
- Lexique du verbe quotidien (recueil d'articles publiés dans les années 1950), Heros-Limite Editions, 2016 ISBN 978-29-40517-49-7
- L'Homme en son temps et en son lieu (rédigé en 1960), Rn éditions, 2017 ISBN 979-10-96562-07-7
- Le totalitarisme industriel, (recueil d'articles parus dans La Gueule ouverte et Combat nature), l'échappée, 2018, ISBN 978-2-37309-047-5
- Quatre témoins de la liberté (inédit, rédigé vers 1990), R&N éditions, 2019. ISBN 979-10-96562-11-4

=== Forewords ===
- La Fin du paysage de Maurice Bardet, Anthropos, Paris, 1972

=== Unpublished works ===
A number of Charbonneau's writings have still not be published to this day. There exists a bibliography of Charbonneau on the website of the Association Internationale Jacques Ellul

=== Articles ===
Bernard Charbonneau has published a large number of articles, most notably in La Gueule ouverte (from 1972 to 1977), La République des Pyrénées (from 1977 to 1983) and Combat Nature (from 1980 to 1996).

Here are two important articles written in the 1930s, where Charbonneau explains and lays out the foundation of his thoughts:

- Directives pour un manifeste personnaliste, 1935 (co-written with Jacques Ellul, available in les Cahiers Jacques-Ellul nº 1, « Les années personnalistes », 2003) and in Nous sommes révolutionnaires malgré nous. Textes pionniers de l'écologie politique (with Jacques Ellul)
- Le sentiment de la nature, force révolutionnaire, 1937, re-published in 2014 in Nous sommes révolutionnaires malgré nous. Textes pionniers de l'écologie politique (with Jacques Ellul)..
