= The Technological Society =

1954/64 book by Jacques Ellul

- Author: Jacques Ellul
- Original title: La Technique ou l'Enjeu du siècle
- Translator: John Wilkinson
- Language: French, English
- Genre: Philosophy, Sociology, Philosophy of Technology
- Publisher: Vintage Books
- Publication date: 1954
- Publication place: United States
- English publication date: 1964
- Pages: 332
- OCLC: 1955603

The Technological Society (French: La Technique ou l'Enjeu du siècle) is a book on the subject of technique by French philosopher, theologian and sociologist Jacques Ellul. Originally published in French in 1954, it was translated into English in 1964.

== On technique ==
The central concept defining a technological society is technique. Technique is different from machines, technology, or procedures for attaining an end. "In our technological society, technique is the totality of methods rationally arrived at and having absolute efficiency (for a given stage of development) in every field of human activity."

== Summary ==
Ellul argues that modern society is being dominated by technique, which he defines as a series of means that are established to achieve an end. Technique is ultimately focused on the concept of efficiency. The term "technique" is to be comprehended in its broadest possible meaning as it touches upon virtually all areas of life, including science, automation, but also politics and human relations.

== Influence ==
Ted Kaczynski (the Unabomber) dedicated himself to reading about sociology and political philosophy, including the works of Jacques Ellul. Kaczynski's brother David later stated that The Technological Society "became Ted's Bible". Kaczynski recounted in 1998, "When I read the book for the first time, I was delighted, because I thought, 'Here is someone who is saying what I have already been thinking.'"

== See also ==
- Man and Technics (1931)
- Lewis Mumford – his series of works on technology is referred to and critiqued in The Technological Society.
- The Question Concerning Technology (1954)

== Bibliography ==
- Matlack, Samuel. "Confronting the Technological Society". Thenewatlantis.com. The New Atlantis.
- "The Technological Society". Kirkus Reviews.
- Lichtheim, George (1964-11-19). "A Nous la Liberte". The New York Review of Books.
- Ellul, Jacques (1964). The Technological Society. Toronto: Vintage Books.
