= List of law enforcement agencies in Pennsylvania =

Flag of the State of Pennsylvania.

This is a list of law enforcement agencies in the state of Pennsylvania.

Pennsylvania says it has more local police departments than any other state in the country. According to the United States Bureau of Justice Statistics' 2018 Census of State and Local Law Enforcement Agencies, the state had 995 law enforcement agencies employing 33,291 sworn police officers, about 260 for each 100,000 residents.

== State Law Enforcement ==
- Pennsylvania Board of Probation and Parole
- Pennsylvania Bureau of Dog Law Enforcement
- Pennsylvania Capitol Police
- Pennsylvania Department of Corrections
- Pennsylvania Department of Conservation and Natural Resources
- Pennsylvania Department of Military and Veterans Affairs
  - Fort Indiantown Gap Police Department
- Pennsylvania Fish and Boat Commission
- Pennsylvania Game Warden
- Pennsylvania State Police
  - Pennsylvania Liquor Control Enforcement
- Pennsylvania State Constables Office
- Pennsylvania Office of the Attorney General
- Pennsylvania Office of the Inspector General
- Pennsylvania Public Utility Commission

== Interstate agencies ==
- Delaware River & Bay Authority Police Department
- SEPTA Police Department
- Delaware River Port Authority Police Department

== County agencies ==
- Adams County
  - Adams County District Attorney's Office
  - Adams County Sheriff's Office
- Allegheny County
  - Allegheny County District Attorney's Office
    - Allegheny County Investigations Unit
  - Allegheny County Police
  - Allegheny County Sheriff's Office
- Armstrong County
  - Armstrong County District Attorney's Office
  - Armstrong County Sheriff's Office
- Beaver County
  - Beaver County District Attorney's Office
    - Beaver County Detective Bureau
  - Beaver County Sheriff's Office
- Bedford County
  - Bedford County District Attorney's Office
  - Bedford County Sheriff's Office
- Berks County
  - Berks County District Attorney's Office
    - Berks County Detectives
  - Berks County Sheriff's Office
- Blair County
  - Blair County District Attorney's Office
  - Blair County Sheriff's Office
- Bradford County
  - Bradford County District Attorney's Office
  - Bradford County Sheriff's Office
- Bucks County
  - Bucks County District Attorney's Office
    - Bucks County Detectives
  - Bucks County Park Police
  - Bucks County Sheriff's Office
- Butler County
  - Butler County District Attorney's Office
    - Butler County Detectives
  - Butler County Sheriff's Office
- Cambria County
  - Cambria County District Attorney's Office
  - Cambria County Sheriff's Office
- Cameron County
  - Cameron County District Attorney's Office
  - Cameron County Sheriff's Office
- Carbon County
  - Carbon County District Attorney's Office
  - Carbon County Sheriff's Office
- Centre County
  - Centre County District Attorney's Office
  - Centre County Sheriff's Office
- Chester County
  - Chester County District Attorney's Office
    - Chester County Detectives
  - Chester County Sheriff's Office
- Clarion County
  - Clarion County District Attorney's Office
  - Clarion County Sheriff's Office
- Clearfield County
  - Clearfield County District Attorney's Office
  - Clearfield County Sheriff's Office
- Clinton County
  - Clinton County Office of District Attorney
  - Clinton County Sheriff's Office
- Columbia County
  - Columbia County District Attorney's Office
  - Columbia County Sheriff's Office
- Crawford County
  - Crawford County District Attorney's Office
  - Crawford County Sheriff's Office
- Cumberland County
  - Cumberland County District Attorney's Office
    - Cumberland County Criminal Investigations Division
  - Cumberland County Sheriff's Office
- Dauphin County
  - Dauphin County District Attorney's Office
    - Dauphin County Criminal Investigation Division
  - Dauphin County Sheriff's Office
- Delaware County
  - Delaware County District Attorney's Office
    - Delaware County Criminal Investigation Division
  - Delaware County Park Police
  - Delaware County Sheriff's Office
- Elk County
  - Elk County District Attorney's Office
  - Elk County Sheriff's Office
- Erie County
  - Erie County District Attorney's Office
  - Erie County Sheriff's Office
- Fayette County
  - Fayette County District Attorney's Office
  - Fayette County Sheriff's Office
- Forest County
  - Forest County District Attorney's Office
  - Forest County Sheriff's Office
- Franklin County
  - Franklin County District Attorney's Office
  - Franklin County Sheriff's Office
- Fulton County
  - Fulton County District Attorney's Office
  - Fulton County Sheriff's Office
- Greene County
  - Greene County District Attorney's Office
  - Greene County Sheriff's Office
- Huntingdon County
  - Huntingdon County District Attorney's Office
  - Huntingdon County Sheriff's Office
- Indiana County
  - Indiana County District Attorney's Office
  - Indiana County Sheriff's Office
- Jefferson County
  - Jefferson County District Attorney's Office
  - Jefferson County Sheriff's Office
- Juniata County
  - Juniata County District Attorney's Office
  - Juniata County Sheriff's Office
- Lackawanna County
  - Lackawanna County District Attorney's Office
  - Lackawanna County Sheriff's Office
- Lancaster County
  - Lancaster County District Attorney's Office
    - Lancaster County Detectives
  - Lancaster County Sheriff's Office
- Lawrence County
  - Lawrence County District Attorney's Office
  - Lawrence County Sheriff's Office
- Lebanon County
  - Lebanon County District Attorney's Office
    - Lebanon County Detectives Bureau
  - Lebanon County Sheriff's Office
- Lehigh County
  - Lehigh County District Attorney's Office
  - Lehigh County Sheriff's Office
- Luzerne County
  - Luzerne County District Attorney's Office
    - Luzerne County Detectives Office
  - Luzerne County Sheriff's Office
- Lycoming County
  - Lycoming County District Attorney's Office
  - Lycoming County Sheriff's Office
- McKean County
  - McKean County District Attorney's Office
  - McKean County Sheriff's Office
- Mercer County
  - Mercer County District Attorney's Office
  - Mercer County Sheriff's Office
- Mifflin County
  - Mifflin County District Attorney's Office
  - Mifflin County Sheriff's Office
- Monroe County
  - Monroe County District Attorney's Office
  - Monroe County Sheriff's Office
- Montgomery County
  - Montgomery County District Attorney's Office
    - Montgomery County Detectives Bureau
  - Montgomery County Sheriff's Office
- Montour County
  - Montour County District Attorney's Office
  - Montour County Sheriff's Office
- Northampton County
  - Northampton County District Attorney's Office
  - Northampton County Sheriff's Office
- Northumberland County
  - Northumberland County District Attorney's Office
  - Northumberland County Sheriff's Office
- Perry County
  - Perry County District Attorney's Office
  - Perry County Sheriff's Office
- Philadelphia County
  - Philadelphia District Attorney's Office
  - Philadelphia Police Department
  - Philadelphia Sheriff's Office
- Pike County
  - Pike County District Attorney's Office
  - Pike County Sheriff's Office
- Potter County
  - Potter County District Attorney's Office
  - Potter County Sheriff's Office
- Schuylkill County
  - Schuylkill County District Attorney's Office
  - Schuylkill County Sheriff's Office
- Snyder County
  - Snyder County District Attorney's Office
  - Snyder County Sheriff's Office
- Somerset County
  - Somerset County District Attorney's Office
    - Somerset County Detectives Bureau of Investigation
  - Somerset County Sheriff's Office
- Sullivan County
  - Sullivan County District Attorney's Office
  - Sullivan County Sheriff's Office
- Susquehanna County
  - Susquehanna County District Attorney's Office
  - Susquehanna County Sheriff's Office
- Tioga County
  - Tioga County District Attorney's Office
  - Tioga County Sheriff's Office
- Union County
  - Union County District Attorney's Office
  - Union County Sheriff's Office
- Venango County
  - Venango County District Attorney's Office
  - Venango County Sheriff's Office
- Warren County
  - Warren County District Attorney's Office
  - Warren County Sheriff's Office
- Washington County
  - Washington County District Attorney's Office
  - Washington County Sheriff's Office
- Wayne County
  - Wayne County District Attorney's Office
    - Wayne County Detectives
  - Wayne County Sheriff's Office
- Westmoreland County
  - Westmoreland County District Attorney's Office
  - Westmoreland County Sheriff's Office
- Wyoming County
  - Wyoming County District Attorney's Office
  - Wyoming County Sheriff's Office
- York County
  - York County District Attorney's Office
    - York County Detectives
  - York County Sheriff's Office
  - York County Ranger Division

== Municipal agencies ==
- Abbottstown Borough Police Department
- Abington Township Police Department
- Adams Township Police Department
- Alburtis Borough Police Department
- Aldan Borough Police Department
- Allegheny Township Police Department
- Allentown Police Department
- Aliquippa City Police Department
- Altoona Police Department
- Ambridge Borough Police Department
- Amity Township Police Department
- Apollo Borough Police Department
- Archbald Borough Police Department
- City of Arnold Police Department
- Ashley Borough Police Department
- Ashland Borough Police Department
- Aspinwall Borough Police Department
- Aston Township Police Department
- Athens Township Police Department
- Auburn Police Department
- Avalon Borough Police Department
- Avoca Borough Police Department
- Avonmore Borough Police Department
- Baden Police Department
- Baldwin Borough Police Department
- Bally Borough Police Department
- Bangor Borough Police Department
- Barnesboro Police Department
- Bear Creek Township/Bear Creek Village Police Department
- Barrett Township Police Department
- Beaver Falls Police Department
- Bedminster Township Police
- Bell Acres Police Department
- Bellefonte Police Department
- Bellwood Police Department
- Ben Avon Heights Police Department
- Bendersville Borough Police Department
- Bensalem Township Police Department
- Bentleyville Police Department
- Berlin Borough Police Department
- Bern Township Police Department
- Bernville Police Department
- Berwick Police Department
- Bessemer Police Department
- Bethel Park Police Department
- Bethel Township Police Department
- Bethlehem Police Department
- Biglerville Police Department
- Birdsboro Police Department
- Birmingham Police Department
- Black Creek Township Police Department
- Blair Township Police Department
- Blairsville Police Department
- Blakely Police Department
- Blakely Borough Police Department
- Blossburg City Police Department
- Bonneauville Police Department
- Boswell Borough Police Department
- Braddock Hills Police Department
- Bradford Police Department
- Brecknock Borough Police Department
- Brentwood Borough Police Department
- Briar Creek Township Police Department
- Bridgeport Township Police Department
- Brighton Township Police Department
- Bristol Borough Police Department
- Bristol Township Police Department
- Brockway Borough Police Department
- Brookhaven Borough Police Department
- Brookville Borough Police Department
- Brownsville Police Department
- Buckingham Township Police
- Buffalo Township Police Department
- Buffalo Valley Regional Police Department
- Butler Police Department
- Caernarvon Township Police
- California Police Department
- Cambria Township Police Department
- Camp Hill Police Department
- Canonsburg Police Department
- Carbondale Police Department
- Carbondale Township Police Department
- Carlisle Police Department
- Carnegie Police Department
- Carroll Township Police Department
- Cass Township Police Department
- Castle Shannon Police Department
- Catasauqua Police Department
- Catawissa Borough Police Department
- Cecil Township Police Department
- Center Township Police Department
- Centerville Police Department
- Chambersburg Police Department
- Charleroi Regional Police Department
- Chartiers Township Police Department
- Cheltenham Township Police Department
- City of Chester Police Department
- Chester Township Police Department
- Chippewa Township Police Department
- Churchill Township Police Department
- Clariton Police Department
- Clarks Summit Police Department
- Clifford Heights Police Department
- Clymer Police Department
- Coal Township Police Department
- Coaldale Police Department
- Coatesville Police Department
- Cochranton Police Department
- Collegeville Police Department
- Collier Police Department
- Collingdale Borough Police Department
- Columbia Police Department
- Colwyn Police Department
- Conneaut Lake Regional Police Department
- Conellsville Police Department
- Conshohocken Borough Police Department
- Conway Borough Police Department
- Conyngham Police Department
- Coopersburg Police Department
- Coplay Borough Police Department
- Coraopolis Police Department
- Cornwall Police Department
- Corry Police Department
- Coudersport Borough Police Department
- Courtdale Borough Police Department
- Covington Township Police Department
- Crafton Police Department
- Cranberry Township Police Department
- Crescent Township Police Department
- Cresson Borough Police Department
- Cumberland Police Department
- Cumru Township Police
- Curwensville Borough Police Department
- Dallas Borough Police Department
- Dallas Township Police Department
- Dalton Borough Police Department
- Danville Police Department
- Darby Borough Police Department
- Darlington Township Police Department
- Decatur Township Police Department
- Deer Lake Police Department
- Delaware Water Gap Police Department
- Derry Borough Police Department
- Derry Township Police
- Dickson City Borough Police Department
- Dormont Borough Police Department
- Douglass Township Police Department
- Downingtown Police Department
- DuBois City Police Department
- Dublin Borough Police Department
- Duncansville Police Department
- Dunmore Police Department
- Dupont Borough Police Department
- Earl Township Police Department
- East Bangor Police Department
- East Berlin Police Department
- East Brady Police Department
- East Brandywine Township Police Department
- East Fallowfield Police Department
- East Franklin Township Police Department
- East Hempfield Township Police Department
- East McKeesport Borough Police Department
- East Norriton Township Police Department
- East Pennsboro Township Police Department
- East Pikeland Police Department
- East Stroudsburg Police Department
- Easttown Police Department
- East Union Township Police Department
- East Vincent Township Police Department
- East Washington Police Department
- East Whiteland Township Police Department
- Easton Police Department
- Ebensburg Police Department
- Economy Borough Police Department
- Eddystone Borough Police Department
- Edgewood Police Department
- Edinboro Police Department
- Elderton Borough Police Department
- Elizabeth Police Department
- Elizabethtown Police Department
- Elkland Police Department
- Elk Lick Police Department
- Ellwood City Police Department
- Emlenton Borough Police Department
- Emmaus City Police Department
- Ephrata Borough Police Department
- Erie Police Department
- Everett Police Department
- Exeter Township Police
- Factoryville Police Department
- Fairview Police Department
- Falls Township Police Department
- Fawn Township Police Department
- Ferguson Township Police Department
- Ferndale Borough Police Department
- Folcroft Police Department
- Forest City Police Department
- Forest Lake Police Department
- Forks Township Police Department
- Forty Fort Borough Police Department
- Fountain Hill Borough Police Department
- Frackville Borough Police Department
- Franklin City Police Department
- Franklin Township Police Department (Beaver County)
- Freeland Borough Police Department
- Freemansburg Police Department
- Gaines Police Department
- Galeton Police Department
- Gallitzin Police Department
- Geistown Borough Police Department
- Gettysburg Borough Police Department
- Girard Police Department
- Glassport Police Department
- Glenolden Borough Police Department
- Gloucester Township Police Department
- Gordon Borough Police Department
- Greencastle Police Department
- Greensburg Police Department
- Greenfield Township Police Department
- Greenville Police Department
- Grove City Borough Police Department
- Halifax Police Department
- Hampton Township Police Department
- Hanover Borough Police Department
- Harding Police Department
- Harmony Police Department
- Harrisburg Bureau of Police
- Harrison Township Police Department
- Harrisville Police Department
- Hartleton Police Department
- Hatboro Police Department
- Hatfield Township Police Department
- Haverford Township Police Department
- Hawley Borough Police Department
- Hazleton City Police Department
- Hegins Township Police Department
- Heidelberg Borough Police Department
- Hellam Township Police Department
- Hellertown Police Department
- Hempfield Township Police Department
- Hermitage Police Department
- Hickory Township Police Department
- Highspire Borough Police Department
- Hilltown Township Police Department
- Hollidaysburg Borough Police Department
- Homer City Police Department
- Homestead Borough Police Department
- Honesdale Police Department
- Hopewell Township Police Department
- Horsham Township Police Department
- Hughestown Borough Police Department
- Hummelstown Borough Police Department
- Huntingdon Borough Police Department
- Independence Township Police Department
- Indiana Township Police Department
- Ingram Borough Police Department
- Irwin Borough Police Department
- Jackson Township Police Department
- Jamestown Police Department
- Jeannette Police Department
- Jefferson Hills Police Department
- Jenkintown Police Department
- Jessup Police Department
- Jim Thorpe Police Department
- Johnsonburg Borough Police Department
- Kennedy Township Police Department
- Kennett Square Police Department (Pennsylvania)
- Kidder Township Police Department
- Kingston Police Department
- Kiskiminetas Township Police Department
- Kline Township Police Department
- Knox Borough Police Department
- Knoxville Borough Police Department
- Koppel Police Department
- Kulpmont Borough Police Department
- Kutztown Borough Police Department
- Lacyville Police Department
- Laflin Borough Police Department
- Lamar Township Police Department
- Lancaster City Bureau of Police
- Langhorne Police Department
- Lansdale Borough Police Department
- Lansdowne Borough Police Department
- Lansford Police Department
- Larksville Borough Police Department
- Latrobe Police Department
- Laureldale Borough Police
- Lawrence Park Township Police Department
- Lawrence Township Police Department
- Lawrenceville Police Department
- Lebanon Police Department
- Leechburg Police Department
- Leesport Police Department
- Leet Township Police Department
- Lehigh Township Police Department
- Lehighton Borough Police Department
- Ligonier Valley Police Department
- Limerick Township Police Department
- Linesville Police Department
- Lititz Borough Police Department
- Littlestown Police Department
- Lock Haven Police Department
- Logan Township Police Department
- Lower Allen Township Police Department
- Lower Burrell Police Department
- Lower Chichester Township Police Department
- Lower Gwynedd Township Police Department
- Lower Heidelberg Township Police
- Lower Makefield Township Police Department
- Lower Merion Police Department
- Lower Moreland Township Police Department
- Lower Paxton Police Department
- Lower Providence Township Police Department
- Lower Saucon Township Police Department
- Lower Southampton Township Police Department
- Lower Swatara Township Police Department
- Lower Windsor Township Police Department
- Luzerne Borough Police Department
- Old Lycoming Police Department
- Lykens Borough Police Department
- Macungie Police Department
- Mahanoy Police Department
- Mahoning Township Police Department
- Malvern Police Department
- Manheim Borough Police Department
- Manor Borough Police Department
- Manor Township Police Department
- Mansfield Police Department
- Marcus Hook Borough Police Department
- Marlborough Township Police Department
- Marple Township Police Department
- Mars Borough Police Department
- Martinsburg Borough Police Department
- Marysville Police Department
- Masontown Police Department
- Mayfield Police Department
- McCandless Police Department
- McDonald Police Department
- McKeesport Police Department
- McKees Rocks Police Department
- McSherrystown Police Department
- Mechanicsburg Police Department
- Media Borough Police Department
- Mercersburg Police Department
- Meshoppen Borough Police Department
- Meyersdale Borough Police Department
- Middlesex Police Department
- Middletown Borough Police Department
- Midland Borough Police Department
- Milford Borough Police Department
- Millbourne Borough Police Department
- Mill Creek Police Department
- Millersville Borough Police Department
- Mill Hall Borough Police Department
- Millvale Borough Police Department
- Minersville Police Department
- Milton Police Department
- Mohnton Police Department
- Monessen Police Department
- Monongahela Police Department
- Monroeville Police Department
- Montgomery Township Police Department
- Montoursville Borough Police Department
- Montrose Borough Police Department
- Moon Township Police Department
- Moore Township Police Department (Pennsylvania) Northampton County
- Moosic Borough Police Department
- Morrisville Borough Police Department
- Morton Borough Police Department
- Moscow Borough Police Department
- Mount Carmel Borough Police Department
- Mount Holly Springs Police Department
- Mount Joy Police Department
- Mount Lebanon Police Department
- Mount Oliver Police Department
- Mount Pleasant Police Department
- Mount Union Borough Police Department
- Muhlenberg Township Police Department
- Muncy Police Department
- Murrysville Police Department
- Myerstown Borough Police Department
- Nanticoke City Police Department
- Nanty Glo Police Department (Pennsylvania)
- Narberth Borough Police Department
- Nescopeck Borough Police Department
- Neshannock Township Police Department
- Nesquehoning Police Department
- Nether Providence Police Department
- New Berlin Police Department
- New Bethlehem Police Department
- New Bloomfield Police Department
- New Britain Borough Police Department
- New Britain Township Police Department
- New Castle Police Department
- New Cumberland Police Department
- New Holland Borough Police Department
- New Hope Borough Police Department
- New Kensington Police Department
- New Wilmington Police Department
- Newberry Township Police Department
- Newport Township Police Department
- Newton Township Police Department
- Newtown Borough Police Department
- Newtown Township Police Department
- Newville Borough Police Department
- Norristown Police Department
- North Belle Vernon Police Department
- North Braddock Police Department
- North Catasauqua Police Department
- North Cornwall Township Police Department
- North Coventry Township Police Department
- North East Police Department
- North Fayette Township Police Department
- North Hampton Borough Police Department
- North Hampton Township Police Department
- North Huntingdon Township Police Department
- North Lebanon Police Department
- North Londonderry Police Department
- North Middleton Township Police Department
- North Sewickley Township Police Department
- North Strabane Township Police Department
- North Versailles Township Police Department
- North Wales Borough Police Department
- North Woodbury Township Police Department
- Oakdale Borough Police Department
- Ohio Township Police Department
- Ohioville Police Department
- Oil City Police Department
- Old Forge Borough Police Department
- Oley Police Department
- Olyphant Police Department
- Orangeville Borough Police Department
- Orwigsburg Borough Police Department
- Patton Township Police Department
- Pen Argyl Borough Police Department
- Penbrook Borough Police Department
- Penn Hills Police Department
- Pennsauken Township Police Department
- Penns Grove Police Department
- Penn Township Police Department
- Perkasie Borough Police Department
- Peters Township Police Department
- Philadelphia Police Department
- Phoenixville Police Department
- Philipsburg Borough Police Department
- Pine Creek Township Police Department
- Pine-Marshall-Bradfordwoods Joint Police Department
- Pitcairn Police Department
- Pittsburgh Bureau of Police
- Pittston City Police Department
- Pittston Township Police Department
- Plain Grove Police Department
- Plains Township Police Department
- Plumstead Township Police Department
- Plymouth Borough Police Department
- Plymouth Township Police Department
- Point Township Police Department
- Port Allegany Police Department
- Port Carbon Police Department
- Pottstown Police Department
- Pottsville Bureau of Police
- Pringle Police Department
- Prospect Park Police Department
- Pulaski Township Police Department
- Punxsutawney Police Department
- Quakertown Borough Police Department
- Quarryville Borough Police Department
- Raccoon Township Police Department
- Radnor Township Police Department
- Ralpho Township Police Department
- Reading Police Department
- Red Lion Police Department
- Renovo Police Department
- Richland Township Police Department
- Ridgway Police Department
- Ridley Park Borough Police Department
- Ridley Township Police Department
- Rimersburg Police Department
- Riverside Borough Police Department
- Roaring Brook Township Police Department
- Robinson Township Police Department
- Rochester Borough Police Department
- Rockwood Police Department
- Roseto Police Department
- Ross Township Police Department
- Rostraver Township Police Department
- Royersford Police Department
- Rush Township Police Department
- Sadsbury Township Police Department
- Saint Clair Police Department
- Saint Marys City Police Department
- Salem Police Department
- Salisbury Township Police Department
- Sandy Township Police Department
- Saxonburg Borough Police Department
- Saxton Borough Police Department
- Sayre Borough Police Department
- Schuylkill Haven Police Department
- Schuylkill Township Police Department
- Scott Township Police Department
- Scottdale Borough Police Department
- Scranton Police Department
- Selinsgrove Borough Police Department
- Sewickley Borough Police Department
- Sewickley Heights Borough Police Department
- Shaler Township Police Department
- Shamokin City Police Department
- Shamokin Dam Police Department
- Sharon Police Department
- Sharon Hill Police Department
- Sharpsburg Police Department
- Shenandoah Borough Police Department
- Shenango Township Police Department
- Shillington Police Department
- Shippensburg Police Department
- Shiremanstown Borough Police Department
- Shoemakersville Police Department
- Shohola Township Police Department
- Silver Lake Township Police Department
- Sinking Spring Borough Police
- Slippery Rock Police Department
- Smethport Police Department
- Smith Township Police Department
- Smithfield Borough Police Department
- Solebury Police Department
- Somerset Borough Police Department
- Souderton Borough Police Department
- South Abington Township Police Department
- South Buffalo Township Police Department
- South Fayette Police Department
- South Heidelberg Township Police Department
- South Heights Police Department
- South Lebanon Township Police Department
- South Londonderry Township Police Department
- South Strabane Township Police Department
- South Waverly Police Department
- South Whitehall Township Police Department
- South Williamsport Police Department
- Spring City Police Department
- Spring Garden Police Department
- Springettsbury Township Police Department
- Springfield Township Police Department
- Spring Township Police Department
- State College Police Department
- Steelton Borough Police Department
- Stowe Township Police Department
- Sugarcreek Borough Police Department
- Sugar Notch Borough Police Department
- Summit Hill Police Department
- Sunbury Police Department
- Susquehanna Township Police Department
- Swatara Township Police Department
- Swarthmore Police Department
- Swissvale Borough Police Department
- Swoyersville Borough Police Department
- Sykesville Police Department
- Tamaqua Borough Police Department
- Tarentum Police Department
- Taylor Borough Police Department
- Throop Police Department
- Tilden Township Police
- Tinicum Township Police Department
- Titusville Police Department
- Towamencin Township Police Department
- Towanda Borough Police Department
- Tower City Police Department
- Township of Spring Police Department
- Trafford Police Department
- Tredyffrin Township Police Department
- Troy Borough Police Department
- Tullytown Borough Police Department
- Tulehocken Township Police Department
- Tunkhannock Borough Police Department
- Turtle Creek Borough Police Department
- Tyrone Borough Police Department
- Union City Police Department
- Union Township Police Department
- Uniontown Police Department
- Upland Borough Police Department
- Upper Allen Police Department
- Upper Burrell Township Police Department
- Upper Chichester Police Department
- Upper Darby Township Police Department
- Upper Dublin Township Police Department
- Upper Gwynedd Police Department
- Upper Macungie Township Police Department
- Upper Makefield Township Police Department
- Upper Merion Township Police Department
- Upper Moreland Township Police Department
- Upper Pottsgrove Police Department
- Upper Providence Township Police Department
- Upper Saint Clair Police Department
- Upper Saucon Township Police Department
- Upper Southampton Township Police Department
- Upper Uwchlan Township Police Department
- Upper Yoder Township Police Department
- Uwchlan Township Police Department
- Valley Township Police Department
- Vandergrift Police Department
- Vernon Township Police Department
- Verona Police Department
- Walnutport Borough Police Department
- Wampum Borough Police Department
- Warminster Township Police Department
- Warren City Police Department
- Warrington Township Police Department
- Washington Township Police Department
- Watsontown Borough Police Department
- Waynesboro Police Department
- Weatherly Police Department
- Wellsboro Police Department
- Wesleyville Police Department
- West Chester Police Department
- West Conshohocken Borough Police Department
- West Deer Township Police Department
- Westfield Borough Police Department
- West Goshen Township Police Department
- West Grove Police Department
- West Hazleton Police Department
- West Hempfield Township Police Department
- West Homestead Police Department
- West Lampeter Township Police Department
- West Mahanoy Township Police Department
- West Manchester Township Police Department
- West Manheim Township Police Department
- West Mead Police Department
- West Mifflin Police Department
- West Newton Police Department
- West Penn Township Police Department
- West Pittston Police Department
- West Reading Police Department
- West Whiteland Township Police Department
- West Wyoming Police Department
- West York Borough Police Department
- Whitehall Township Bureau of Police
- Whitemarsh Township Police Department
- Wilkes-Barre City Police Department
- Wilkes-Barre Township Police Department
- Williamsburg Police Department
- Williamsport Police Department
- Williamstown Borough Police Department
- Wilson Borough Police Department
- Windber Borough Police Department
- Worthington Borough Police Department
- Wright Township Police Department
- Wrightsville Borough Police Department
- Wyoming Borough Police Department
- Wyomissing Borough Police Department
- Yardley Borough Police Department
- Yatesville Borough Police Department
- Yeadon Borough Police Department
- York City Police Department
- Zelienople Borough Police Department
- Zerbe Township Police Department

== Regional police agencies ==
- Allegheny Valley Regional Police Department
- Buffalo Valley Regional Police Department
- Central Berks Regional Police Department
- Central Bucks Regional Police Department
- Charleroi Regional Police Department
- Colonial Regional Police Department
- Eastern Adams Regional Police Department
- Eastern Pike Regional Police
- Eastern Regional Mon Valley Police Department
- Greene Washington Regional Police Department
- Mifflin County Regional Police Department
- Morris-Cooper Regional Police Department
- Northern Berks Regional Police Department
- Northern Regional Police Department
- Northern York County Regional Police Department
- Northwest Regional Police Department
- Pennridge Regional Police
- Pocono Mountain Regional Police Department
- RESA Regional Police Department
- Slate Belt Regional Police Department
- Mifflin County Regional Police Department
- Southern Regional Police Department
- Southern Chester County Regional Police Department
- Southwest Regional Police Department
- Stroud Area Regional Police Department
- Susquehanna Regional Police Department
- Upper Perk Police District
- Western Berks Regional Police Department
- West Hills Regional Police Department
- West Shore Regional Police Department
- West Side Regional Police Department
- Westtown-East Goshen Regional Police Department
- York County Regional Police Department

== College and University agencies ==
The State of Pennsylvania permits both public and private colleges and universities to operate police departments under either Campus Police or Private Police designation within the law. Police Officers employed by universities serve as fully sworn police officers, and are required to hold Pennsylvania Act 120 Certification in order to serve as campus police officers.

- Bucknell University Department of Public Safety
- Carlow University Police Department
- Carnegie Mellon University Police Department
- Cedar Crest College Police Department
- Chatham University Public Safety Department
- Cheyney University Department of Campus Safety
- DeSales University Police
- Dickinson College Department of Public Safety
- Drexel University Department of Public Safety
- Duquesne University Department of Public Safety
- East Stroudsburg University Police Department
- Gannon University Office of Campus Police and Safety
- Franklin and Marshall University Department of Public Safety
- Indiana University of Pennsylvania Office of Public Safety
- Kutztown University Police Department
- Lake Erie College of Osteopathic Medicine Campus Safety
- Lafayette College Department of Public Safety
- Lehigh University Police Department
- Lincoln University Police Department
- Lock Haven University Police Department
- Mercyhurst University Department of Police and Safety
- Millersville University Police Department
- Moravian University Police Department
- Mount Aloysius College Campus Safety & Police
- Muhlenberg College Department of Campus Safety and Police
- Penn State University Police Department
- Point Park University Department of Public Safety
- Robert Morris University Public Safety Department
- Saint Francis University Police Department
- Seton Hill University Department of Campus Safety
- Shippensburg University Police Department
- Slippery Rock University Police Department
- Temple University Department of Public Safety
- Thomas Jefferson University Department of Public Safety
- University of Pennsylvania Police Department
- University of Pittsburgh Police Department
- University of Scranton Police Department
- Villanova University Department of Public Safety
- West Chester University Department of Public Safety
- Wilkes University Department of Public Safety
- York College of Pennsylvania Department of Campus Police

== Federal agencies ==
- Administrative Office of the United States Courts
  - U.S. Probation and Pretrial Services System
- Amtrak Police Department
- United States Department of Defense
  - Army Civilian Police
- United States Department of Veterans Affairs Police
- United States Marshal Service
  - Office of the United States Marshal for the Eastern District of Pennsylvania
  - Office of the United States Marshal for the Middle District of Pennsylvania
  - Office of the United States Marshal for the Western District of Pennsylvania
- United States Mint Police

== Public agencies ==
- Allegheny County Housing Authority Police Department
- Allegheny County Port Authority Police Department
- Bethel Park School District Police Department
- Central Dauphin School District Police Department
- Chester Housing Authority Police Department
- East Stroudsburg School District Police
- Gateway School District Police
- Grove City Area School District Police Department
- Monroe County Waste Authority Police Department
- Nazareth Area School District Police Department
- Philadelphia Housing Authority Office of Public Safety
- School District Of The City Of York Police Department
- Spring-Ford School Police Department
- South Fayette School District Police Department
- Trinity Area School District Police Department

== Private company/Non-public agency ==
- Allegheny Health Network Police
- Animal Friends of Pittsburgh. Humane Society Investigators (Level 2 Humane Officers)
- Berks Animal Rescue League (Level 2 Humane Officers)
- Brandywine Animal Shelter. (Level 2 Humane Officers)
- Bucks County SPCA (Level 2 Humane Officers)
- Central PA Humane Society Investigators (Level 2 Humane Officers)
- Clinton County SPCA. Investigators (Level 2 Humane Officers)
- CSX Police Department
- Erie Humane Society (Level 1 Police Officers)
- Geisinger Health Police
- Griffin Pond Animal Shelter (Level 2 Humane Officers)
- Lehigh Valley Humane Society. (Level 1 Police Officers)
- Lackawanna Griffin Humane Society Investigators (Level 2 Humane Officers)
- Luzerne County SPCA Investigators (Level 2 Humane Officers)
- Norfolk Southern Railway Police
- Pennsylvania SPCA Police (Philadelphia) (Level 1 Police Officers)
- Pike County SPCA Police (Level 1 Police Officers)
- Pike County SPCA Investigators serving Lehman Township Municipal Building (Level 2 Humane Officers)
- Pittsburgh Animal Rescue (Level 2 Humane Officers)
- Providence Animal Shelter. (Level 2 Humane Officers)
- Reading and Northern Railroad Police
- UPMC Children's Hospital of Pittsburgh Public Safety Department

== Disbanded agencies ==
- Akron Borough Police Department (Lancaster County) (Successor Agency - West Earl Township Police Department)
- Albion Borough Police Department
- Aleppo Township Police Department (Successor Agency - Ohio Township Police Department)
- Allentown Fairgrounds Police Department
- Atglen Borough Police Department (Chester County)
- Austin Borough Police Department (Potter County)
- Bath Borough Police Department
- Bechtelsville Borough Police Department (Successor Agency - Colebrookdale District Police Department)
- Belle Vernon Borough Police Department (Successor Agency - Southwest Regional Police Department)
- Ben Avon Borough Police Department (Successor Agency - Ohio Township Police Department)
- Berks-Lehigh Regional Police
- Bernville Borough Police Department (Berks County)
- Boyertown Borough Police Department (Successor Agency - Eastern Berks Regional Police Department)
- Brackenridge Borough Police Department (Allegheny County) (Successor Agency - Tarentum Borough Police Department)
- Braddock Borough Police Department (Allegheny County) (Successor Agency - Eastern Regional Mon Valley Police Department)
- Brandywine Regional Police
- Burgettstown Borough Police Department (Successor Agency - McDonald Borough Police Department)
- Carmichaels Borough Police Department (Greene County) (Successor Agency - Cumberland Township Police Department)
- Chalfant Borough Police Department (Allegheny County) (Successor Agency - Borough of Forest Hills Police Department)
- Chalfont Borough Police Department (Bucks County) (Successor Agency - Central Bucks County Regional Police Department)
- Chester-Upland School District Police Department
- Cheswick Borough Police Department (Successor Agency - Allegheny Valley Regional Police Department)
- Clearfield Borough Police Department (Successor Agency - Clearfield Regional Police Department)
- Clifford Township Police Department
- Coal and Iron Police
- Colebrookdale District Police Department (Successor Agency - Eastern Berks Regional Police Department)
- Conewago Township Police Department (York County) (Successor Agency - Northern York County Regional Police Department)
- Confluence Borough Police Department (Somerset County)
- Connoquenessing Borough Police Department
- Coolbaugh Township Police Department
- Cressona Borough Police Department (Schuylkill County)
- Dale Borough Police Department (Successor Agency - City of Johnstown Police Department)
- Dallastown Borough Police Department (York County) (Successor Agency - York County Regional Police Department)
- Delta Borough Police Department (York County)
- Dillsburg Borough Police Department (York County) (Successor Agency - Carroll Township Police Department)
- Dover Borough Police Department (York County) (Successor Agency - Northern York County Regional Police Department)
- Dover Township Police Department (York County) (Successor Agency - Northern York County Regional Police Department)
- Doylestown Borough Police Department (Bucks County) (Successor Agency - Central Bucks Regional Police Department)
- Dravosburg Police Department (Successor Agency - McKeesport City Police Department
- Duncannon Borough Police Department
- East Bethlehem Township Police Department (Washington County) (Successor Agency - Centerville Borough Police Department)
- East Buffalo Township Police Department (Union County) (Successor Agency - Buffalo Valley Regional Police Department)
- East Deer Township Police Department (Allegheny County) (Successor Agency - Allegheny Valley Regional Police Department)
- East Manchester Township Police Department (York County) (Successor Agency - York County Regional Police Department)
- East Pittsburgh Police Department (Successor Agency - Eastern Regional Mon Valley Police Department)
- East Prospect Borough Police Department (York County) (Successor Agency - Lower Windsor Township Police Department)
- Edwardsville Borough Police Department (Luzerne County) (Successor Agency - West Side Regional Police Department)
- Ellsworth/Cokeburg Boroughs (Ell-Co) Police Department
- Emsworth Borough Police Department (Successor Agency - Ohio Township Police Department)
- Evans City/Seven Fields Regional Police Department Successor Agencies - (Seven Fields Borough Covered by Northern Regional Police Department) (Evans City Borough reestablished borough police)
- Fairchance Borough Police Department
- Fallowfield Township Police Department (Washington County)
- Fawn Grove Borough Police Department (York County)
- Felton Borough Police Department (York County) (Successor Agency - North Hopewell Township Police Department)
- Franklin Township Police Department (York County) (Successor Agency - Northern York County Regional Police Department)
- Franklintown Borough Police Department (York County) (Successor Agency - Carroll Township Police Department)
- Freeport Borough Police Department (Armstrong County) - (Successor Agency Southern Armstrong Regional Police)
- Ford City Borough Police Department (Armstrong County) - (Successor Agency Southern Armstrong Regional Police)
- Forward Township Police Department (Allegheny County) (Successor Agency - Elizabeth Township Police Department contracted through 2026)
- Gilberton Borough Police Department (Schuylkill County)
- Gilpin Township Police Department (Armstrong County) - (Successor Agency Southern Armstrong Regional Police)
- Girardville Borough Police Department (Schuylkill County)
- Glen Rock Borough Police Department (York County) (Successor Agency - Southern Regional Police Department)
- Goldsboro Borough Police Department (York County) (Successor Agency - Newberry Township Police Department)
- Hallam Borough Police Department (York County) (Successor Agency - Hellam Township Police Department)
- Hamiltonban Township Police Department (Adams County)
- Heidelberg Township Police Department (York County) (Successor Agency - Northern York County Regional Police Department)
- Hickory Township Police Department (Lawrence County)
- Houston Police Department (Washington County) (Successor Agency - Canonsburg Police Department)
- Industry Borough Police Department (Successor Agency - Beaver Borough Police Department)
- Jackson Township Police Department (York County) (Successor Agency - Northern York County Regional Police Department)
- Jacobus Borough Police Department (York County) (Successor Agency - York County Regional Police Department)
- Jefferson Borough Police Department (York County)
- Kennywood Park Police name changed to Kennywood Public Safety
- Kilbuck Township Police Department (Successor Agency - Ohio Township Police Department)
- Larksville Borough Police Department (Luzerne County) (Successor Agency - West Side Regional Police Department)
- Lawrence Township Police Department (Clearfield County) - (Successor Agency Clearfield Regional Police Department)
- Leesport Borough Police Department (Successor Agency - Northern Berks Regional Police Department)
- Lewisberry Borough Police Department (York County) (Successor Agency - Fairview Township Police Department)
- Lewisburg Borough Police Department (Union County) (Successor Agency - Buffalo Valley Regional Police Department)
- Ligonier Borough Police Department (Successor Agency - Ligonier Valley Police Department)
- Ligonier Township Police Department (Successor Agency - Ligonier Valley Police Department)
- Loganville Borough Police Department (York County)
- Long Branch Borough Police Department (Washington County)
- Lower Yoder Township Police Department (Cambria County) (Successor Agency - West Hills Regional Police Department)
- Maidencreek Township Police Department (Successor Agency - Maidencreek Ontelaunee Joint Police Commission)
- Maidencreek Ontelaunee Joint Police Commission (Successor Agency - Northern Berks Regional Police Department)
- Manchester Borough Police Department (York County) (Successor Agency - York County Regional Police Department)
- Manchester Township Police Department (York County) (Successor Agency - Northern York County Regional Police Department)
- Manheim Township Police Department (York County) (Successor Agency - Northern York Regional Police Department)
- Matamoras Borough Police Department (Pike County) (Successor Agency - Eastern Pike Regional Police Department)
- Midway Borough Police Department (Successor Agency - McDonald Borough Police Department)
- Montgomery Borough Police Department (Lycoming County)
- Morris Township Police Department (Greene County) (Successor Agency - Greene County Regional Police Department)
- Mount Pocono Borough Police Department
- Mount Wolf Borough Police Department (York County) (Successor Agency - York County Regional Police Department)
- Myerstown Borough Police Department
- Neville Township Police Department (Successor Agency - Ohio Township Police Department)
- Newport Borough Police Department
- New Britain Borough Police Department (Bucks County) (Successor Agency - Central Bucks Regional Police Department)
- New Eagle Borough Police Department (Successor Agency - City of Monongahela Police Department)
- New Florence Borough Police Department (Successor Agency - St. Clair Township Police Department)
- New Freedom Borough Police Department (York County) (Successor Agency - Southern Regional Police Department)
- New Garden Police Department
- New Holland Borough Police Department (Lancaster County) (Successor Agency - West Earl Township Police Department)
- North Braddock Borough Police Department (Allegheny County)(Successor Agency - Eastern Regional Mon Valley Police Department)
- North Charleroi Borough Police Department (Successor Agency - Charleroi Regional Police Department)
- North Codorus Township Police (York County) (Successor Agency - Northern York County Regional Police Department)
- Northeastern Regional Police Department (York County) (Successor Agency - York County Regional Police Department)
- North Franklin Township Police Department (Washington County)
- North Irwin Borough Police Department (Westmoreland County)(Successor Agency - Irwin Borough Police Department)
- North York Borough Police Department (York County) (Successor Agency - Northern York County Regional Police Department)
- Oliver Township Police Department (Perry County)
- Ohiopyle Borough Police Department (Fayette County)
- Oley Township Police Department (Successor Agency - Central Berks Regional Police Department)
- Ontelaunee Township Police Department (Successor Agency - Northern Berks Regional Police Department)
- Paint Borough Police Department (Successor Agency - Windber Borough Police Department)
- Paint Township Police Department (Somerset County)
- Paradise Township Police (York County) (Successor Agency - Northern York Regional Police Department)
- Penn Argyl Borough Police Department (Northampton County) (Successor Agency - Slate Belt Regional Police Department)
- Penn Township Police Department (Perry County)
- Pike Township Police Department (Berks County)
- Pine Township Police Department (Allegheny County) (Successor Agency - Pine-Marshall-Bradford Woods Police Department)
- Pine-Marshall-Bradford Woods Police Department (Successor Agency - Northern Regional Police Department)
- Plainfield Township Police Department (Northampton County) (Successor Agency - Slate Belt Regional Police Department)
- Presque Isle State Park Police Department (Successor Agency - Pennsylvania Department of Conservation and Natural Resources)
- Railroad Borough Police Department (York County) (Successor Agency - Southern Regional Police Department)
- Rankin Borough Police Department (Allegheny County) (Successor Agency - Eastern Regional Mon Valley Police Department)
- Red Lion Borough Police Department (York County)
- Richland Township Police Department (Allegheny County) (Successor Agency - Northern Regional Police Department)
- Robesonia Borough Police Department (Berks County) (Successor Agency - South Heidelberg Township Police Department)
- Rosslyn Farms Borough Police Department (Successor Agency - Scott Township Police Department)
- Rye Township Police Department (Perry County)
- Roulette Township Police Department (Potter County)
- Seven Fields Borough Police Department (Butler County)(Successor Agency - Northern Regional Police Department)
- Seven Springs Borough Police Department (Somerset/Fayette Counties)
- Seven Valleys Borough Police Department (York County)
- Seward Borough Police Department (Successor Agency - St. Clair Township Police Department)
- Shoemakersville Borough Police Department (Berks County)
- State Police of Crawford and Erie Counties
- Shrewsbury Borough Police Department (York County) (Successor Agency - Southern Regional Police Department)
- South Connellsville Borough Police Department (Successor Agency - City of Connellsville Police Department)
- South Versailles Township Police Department (Successor Agency - White Oak Borough Police Department)
- Southwestern Regional Police Department (York County)
- Springdale Township Police Department (Allegheny County) (Successor Agency - Allegheny Valley Regional Police Department)
- Springfield Township Police Department (York County)
- Spring Garden Township Police Department (York County) (Successor Agency - York County Regional Police Department)
- Spring Grove Borough Police Department (York County) (Successor Agency - York County Regional Police Department)
- Stewartstown Borough Police Department (York County) (Successor Agency - Southern Regional Police Department)
- Sweden Township Police Department (Potter County)
- Thornburg Borough Police Department (Allegheny County) (Successor Agency - Crafton Borough Police Department)
- Thornbury Police Department
- Tobyhanna Township Police Department
- Tidioute Borough Police Department
- Tiadaghton Valley Regional Police Department
- Tremont Borough Police Department (Schuylkill County)
- Tunkhannock Township Police Department
- Union Township Police Department (Washington County) (Successor Agency City of Monongahela Police Department)
- Upper Yoder Township Police Department (Cambria County) (Successor Agency - West Hills Regional Police Department)
- Vanderbilt Borough Police Department
- Vanport Township Police Department (Successor Agency - Beaver Borough Police Department)
- Wernersville Borough Police Department (Berks County) (Successor Agency - South Heidelberg Township Police Department)
- West Elizabeth Borough Police Department (Successor Agency - Elizabeth Township Police Department)
- Wellsville Borough Police Department (York County)
- Westfall Township Police Department (Pike County) (Successor Agency - Eastern Pike Regional Police Department)
- West Grove Police Department* New Garden Police Department (Successor Agency - Southern Chester County Regional Police Department)
- West Taylor Township Police Department (Successor Agency - City of Johnstown Police Department)
- Wharton Township Police Department (Fayette County)
- Wilmerding Borough Police Department (Successor Agency - Pitcairn Police Department)
- Wind Gap Borough Police Department (Northampton County) (Successor Agency - Slate Belt Regional Police Department)
- Windsor Borough Police Department (York County)
- Windsor Township Police Department (York County) (Successor Agency - York County Regional Police Department)
- Winterstown Borough Police Department (York County) (Successor Agency - North Hopewell Township Police Department)
- Wrightsville Borough Police Department (York County) (Successor Agency - Hellam Township Police Department)
- Yoe Borough Police Department (York County) (Successor Agency - York County Regional Police Department)
- York Area Regional Police Department (York County) (Successor Agency - York County Regional Police Department)
- York Haven Borough Police Department (York County) (Successor Agency - Newberry Township Police Department)
- York Township Police Department (York County) (Successor Agency - York County Regional Police Department)
- Youngwood Borough Police Department
