= Tiadaghton Valley Regional Police Department =

American law enforcement agency

Jurisdictional structure
- Operations jurisdiction: Western Lycoming County, Pennsylvania (Borough of Jersey Shore and Cummings, McHenry, Nippenose, Piatt, Porter townships), United States
- Area: 168.4 sq mi (436.154 km^{2})
- Population: 8,458 (2010)

Facilities
- Patrol cars: 3
- Patrol SUVs: 6
- K9s: 1

The Tiadaghton Valley Regional Police Department (TVRPD) was a regional police department in Lycoming County, Pennsylvania. As of January 1, 2023, TVRPD merged with Old Lycoming Police Department to form the Lycoming Regional Police Department. The department served the residents of Jersey Shore borough as well as Cummings, McHenry, Nippenose, Piatt, and Porter townships.

== History ==
Tiadaghton Valley Regional Police Department was formed via the merger of Jersey Shore Borough Police Department and Porter Township Police Department in 2010.

== Vehicles ==
TVRPD operates an all-Ford fleet. They operate marked and unmarked Ford Interceptor sedans police version of the Taurus and Ford Interceptor Utility police version of the Explorer.

== Fallen officers ==
_{Officers featured in this section died from injuries after or while conducting law enforcement operations while on duty.}

Date	Name	Age	Cause	Details
10 December 1904^{a}	Edward Norton Jr	48	Heart Attack	Norton suffered a fatal hard attack shortly after separating two fighting juveniles.

Note

a.This occurred well before regionalisation. Norton was member of the Jersey Shore Borough Police Department.

== See also ==
- List of law enforcement agencies in Pennsylvania
