= WRCP =

WRCP may refer to:

- Wild Resource Conservation Program, a biodiversity conservation program in Pennsylvania, United States
- WNWR, a radio station (1540 AM) licensed to Philadelphia, Pennsylvania, United States, which held the call sign WRCP from 1967 to 1985
- WRFF, a radio station (104.5 FM) licensed to Philadelphia, Pennsylvania, United States, which held the call sign WRCP-FM from 1965 to 1977
- WPVD (AM), a radio station (1290 AM) licensed to Providence, Rhode Island, United States, which held the call sign WRCP from 1985 to 1998
- WZPH-LP, a radio station (96.7 FM) licensed to Dade City, Florida, United States, which held the call sign WRCP-LP from 2002 to 2003
- WRCP-LP, a radio station (94.5 FM) licensed to Readfield, Maine, United States, which currently holds the call sign WRCP-LP
