= Pennsylvania Department of Conservation and Natural Resources =

Agency in the U.S. State of Pennsylvania

Agency overview
- Formed: July 1, 1995
- Jurisdiction: Government of Pennsylvania
- Headquarters: Rachel Carson State Office Building, 400 Market Street, Harrisburg, Pennsylvania, U.S.; 40°15′45″N 76°52′47″W
- Employees: 1,400 full-time 1,300 seasonal (2025)
- Annual budget: $630,000,000 (FY2024)
- Agency executive: Cindy Dunn, Secretary of Conservation and Natural Resources
- Website: Pennsylvania Department of Conservation and Natural Resources

The Pennsylvania Department of Conservation and Natural Resources (DCNR), established in 1995, is the agency in the U.S. state of Pennsylvania responsible for maintaining and preserving the state's 125 state parks and 20 state forests; providing information on the state's natural resources; and working with communities to benefit local recreation and natural areas. The agency has its headquarters in the Rachel Carson State Office Building in Harrisburg.

== History ==
The Pennsylvania Department of Conservation and Natural Resources was formed from the Conservation and Natural Resources Act, Act 18, enacted June 28,1995. It implements Article I, Section 27 of the Pennsylvania Constitution, which says, "The people have a right to clean air, pure water, and to the preservation of the natural, scenic, historic, and esthetic values of the environment. Pennsylvania's public natural resources are the common property of all of the people, including generations yet to come. As trustee of these resources, the Commonwealth shall conserve and maintain them for the benefit of all the people."

The department was formed on July 1, 1995, when then-governor Tom Ridge split the Department of Environmental Resources (DER) into the DCNR and Department of Environmental Protection (DEP).

The DCNR was created to save and fix the damaged and exploited environment in Pennsylvania from the mining industry and oil booms. The Valley Forge State Park was the first state park created in Pennsylvania. Valley Forge State Park was founded May 30, 1893. The park failed to get federal funding so the governor at the time, Robert E. Pattison signed act 130 “for the acquisition of ground at Valley Forge for a public park.” The Valley Forge park is now a national park.

These efforts were driven by concerned citizens of Pennsylvania. They turned “Pennsylvanian desserts” as they used to call them, back into lush forests.

== Budget, staff ==
As of Fall 2025, the DCNR employed approximately 2,700 employees. 1,400 full-time employees work year round, and 1,300 employees work seasonally. Seasonal employees are especially needed in the summer months, when visitor traffic to state parks increases significantly between May and September.

The DCNR lists employment categories in multiple fields. The DCNR website contains the following list of employment categories within the agency:

- Administrative
- Communications and Public Policy
- Environmental Education
- Forestry
- Human Resources
- Information Technology
- Law Enforcement and Safety
- Maintenance and Trades
- Parks and Recreation

DCNR positions are mostly civil-service jobs, with over 90% of DCNR positions falling in this category. Positions that are not civil-service are primarily seasonal positions with hourly pay.

The annual budget allocated towards the DCNR in FY 2024 was $630,000,000.

== Organization and leadership ==
=== Leadership ===
The DCNR is led by the Secretary of the Pennsylvania Department of Conservation and Natural Resources, who is appointed by the Governor of Pennsylvania. Three Deputy Secretaries oversee the Bureaus and Offices within the DCNR.

=== Bureaus ===
The DCNR comprises the following subunits:

- Deputy Secretary for Parks and Forestry
  - Bureau of State Parks
  - Bureau of Forestry
  - Bureau of Facility Design and Construction
- Deputy Secretary for Conservation and Technical Services
  - Bureau of Geological Survey
  - Bureau of Recreation and Conservation
  - Wild Resource Conservation Program
- Deputy Secretary for Administration
  - Bureau of Human Resources
  - Bureau of Administrative Services
  - Bureau of Information Technology
- Office of Education, Communications and Partnerships
- Office of Planning and Policy
- Office of Outdoor Recreation
- Office of Conservation Science
  - Pennsylvania Natural Heritage Program
- Chief Counsel

== Law enforcement ==
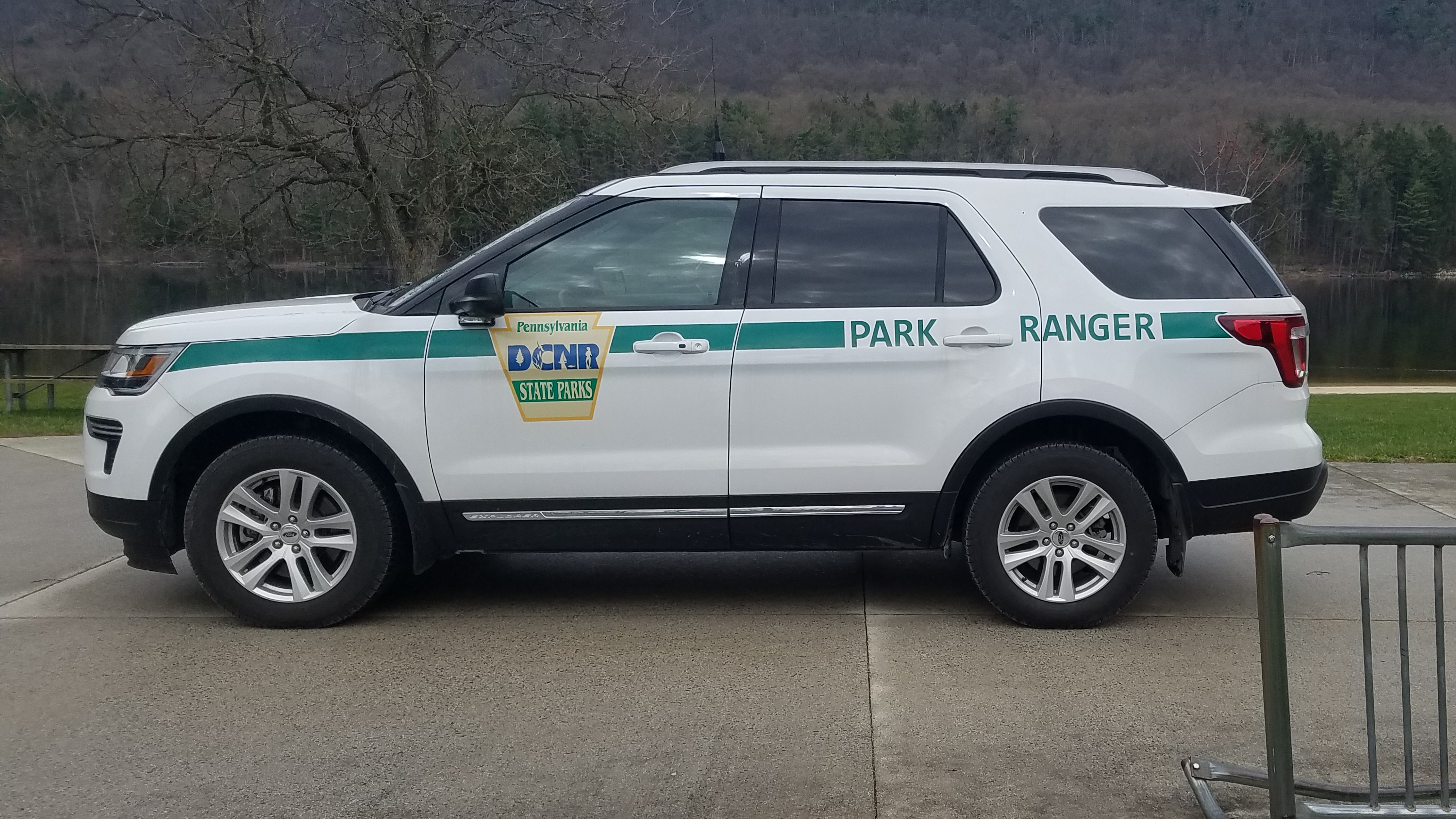
DCNR ranger vehicle at Cowans Gap State Park

Pennsylvania DCNR rangers act much like National Park Rangers do. They routinely check on cabins and campsites, offer insightful answers to visitors questions, and help to maintain calmness throughout the parks. They have full arrest powers while in park lands and carry side arms. However, they do not have primary jurisdiction over Pennsylvania State Game Lands, which are patrolled by Wildlife Conservation Officers employed by the Pennsylvania Game Commission, but do have the authority to enforce all Pennsylvania and Pennsylvania Game Commission laws and regulations while on Pennsylvania State Game Lands. French Creek State Park and State Game Lands #43 are examples, as DCNR rangers regularly enforce PGC regulations giving tickets to offenders at PGC's public shooting range. DCNR rangers enforce game laws as well as fishing and boating laws in state parks. However, the Pennsylvania Fish and Boat Commission is completely independent of the Pennsylvania Game Commission. Both agencies are independent of DCNR, but work in cooperation with each other.

DCNR ranger responsibilities have three primary elements:

1. Public contact - Assisting visitors to make the outdoor experience safe, educational and enjoyable.
2. First responder - DCNR "forest" rangers are trained and certified Department of Health medical first responders capable of providing basic life support in an emergency. Some DCNR rangers have continued their education and training to be certified as emergency medical technicians.
3. Law enforcement - Rangers act as law enforcement officers the same way as typical police officers would, but also enforce game, fishing, and boating laws.

== Education ==
The DCNR is host to many different environmental education programs throughout the summer months. These range from topics such as "Leave No Trace" hiking/camping policy to the different wildlife and plant species of many of the state parks.

== See also ==
- List of law enforcement agencies in Pennsylvania
- List of Pennsylvania state agencies
- Natural Lands
