= Both/and reasoning =

Form of reasoning – not either/or

Both/and is an academic concept which refers to a form of reasoning which resists binary or either/or styles of thinking.

Unlike dualistic styles of reasoning, both/and means that between two options, both can be valid, or that their opposition may present opportunities for dialectical synthesis, rather than a complete rejection of one of the premises in favor of the other.

Both/and is associated with dialectical thinking, which means investigating contradictions in order to attain higher understanding. However, it also appears in broader systems of thought, such as the concept of nondualism, in which the distinction between self and other is transcended.

The term has been used in a texts on management, literary theory, classroom research, religious studies, methodology, and international relations.

== See also ==
- Win–win game
- You can't have your cake and eat it
