= List of Pennsylvania state agencies =

State related agencies of the Commonwealth of Pennsylvania.

== Agencies ==
- Pennsylvania Attorney General
- Pennsylvania Auditor General
- Pennsylvania Board of Probation and Parole
- Pennsylvania Department of Aging
- Pennsylvania Department of Agriculture
- Pennsylvania Department of Banking
- Pennsylvania Department of Community and Economic Development
- Pennsylvania Department of Conservation and Natural Resources
  - Bureau of Forestry
  - Bureau of State Parks
  - Office of Conservation Science
    - Pennsylvania Natural Heritage Program
    - Wild Resource Conservation Program
- Pennsylvania Department of Corrections
- Pennsylvania Department of Drug and Alcohol Programs
- Pennsylvania Department of Education
  - Pennsylvania Intermediate Units (IU)
  - State Library of Pennsylvania
- Pennsylvania Department of Environmental Protection
- Pennsylvania Department of General Services
- Pennsylvania Department of Health
  - Pennsylvania Bureau of Laboratories
- Pennsylvania Department of Human Services
- Pennsylvania Department of Insurance
- Pennsylvania Department of Labor and Industry
- Pennsylvania Department of Military & Veterans Affairs
  - Pennsylvania National Guard (PANG)
    - Pennsylvania Air National Guard
    - Pennsylvania Army National Guard
- Pennsylvania Department of Revenue
- Pennsylvania Department of State
- Pennsylvania Department of Transportation
- Pennsylvania Emergency Management Agency
- Pennsylvania Higher Education Assistance Agency
- Pennsylvania Housing Finance Agency
- Pennsylvania Municipal Retirement System
- Pennsylvania Office of Administration
- Pennsylvania Office of the Budget
- Pennsylvania Office of General Counsel
- Pennsylvania Public School Employees' Retirement System
- Pennsylvania Public Utility Commission
- Pennsylvania State Employees' Retirement System
- Pennsylvania State Police
- Pennsylvania State System of Higher Education
- Pennsylvania State Treasurer

== Offices ==
- Pennsylvania Office of Open Records
- Office of Administrative Law Judge
- Pennsylvania Office of Strategic Services
- Office of the Pennsylvania First Lady
- Office of the Pennsylvania Governor
- Office of the Pennsylvania Lieutenant Governor
- Office of the Pennsylvania State Fire Commissioner
- Pennsylvania Governor's Office of Health Care Reform
- Pennsylvania Office of Consumer Advocate
- Pennsylvania Office of Financial Education
- Pennsylvania Office of Inspector General
- Pennsylvania Office of Public Liaison
- Pennsylvania Office of the Budget
- Pennsylvania Office of the Victim Advocate

== Commissions & Councils ==
- Pennsylvania Civil Service Commission
- Pennsylvania Commission on Crime and Delinquency
- Pennsylvania Fish and Boat Commission
- Pennsylvania Game Commission
- Pennsylvania Gaming Control Board
- Pennsylvania Governor’s Commission on Children & Families
- Pennsylvania Governor's Advisory Commission on African American Affairs
- Pennsylvania Governor's Advisory Commission on Asian American Affairs
- Pennsylvania Governor's Advisory Commission on Latino Affairs
- Pennsylvania Governor's Advisory Council for Hunting, Fishing & Conservation
- Pennsylvania Governor's Advisory Council on Rural Affairs
- Pennsylvania Governor's Commission on Training America’s Teachers
- Pennsylvania Governor's Council on Physical Fitness & Sports
- Pennsylvania Governor's Green Government Council
- Pennsylvania Historical and Museum Commission
- Pennsylvania Independent Regulatory Review Commission
- Pennsylvania Juvenile Court Judges' Commission
- Pennsylvania Liquor Control Board (PLCB)
- Pennsylvania Commission for Women
- Pennsylvania Council on the Arts
- Pennsylvania Health Care Cost Containment Council
- Pennsylvania Human Relations Commission
- Port of Pittsburgh Commission
- Pennsylvania Public Employee Retirement Commission
- Pennsylvania Securities Commission
- Pennsylvania State Ethics Commission
- Pennsylvania Turnpike Commission

== State Related ==
- CareerLink
- Commonwealth System of Higher Education
- Pennsylvania State System of Higher Education (PASSHE)
- Pennsylvania Higher Education Assistance Agency (PHEAA)

== Defunct departments ==
- Pennsylvania State Board of Censors
  - Pennsylvania Department of Commerce
  - Pennsylvania Department of Community Affairs

These two departments were merged to form the Pennsylvania Department of Community and Economic Development.

- Pennsylvania Department of Environmental Resources
- Pennsylvania Department of Forests and Water

== See also ==
- List of municipal authorities in Pennsylvania
- List of Pennsylvania fire departments
- List of United States federal agencies
- Pennsylvania State Capitol Complex
