= Manhunt (2017 TV series) =

American crime drama anthology television series

- Television release poster for first season
- Genre: Drama; True crime
- Created by: Andrew Sodroski; Jim Clemente; Tony Gittelson
- Starring: Sam Worthington; Paul Bettany; Jeremy Bobb; Keisha Castle-Hughes; Lynn Collins; Brían F. O'Byrne; Elizabeth Reaser; Ben Weber; Chris Noth
- Composers: Gregory Tripi (season 1); Harry Gregson-Williams (season 2); Stephanie Economou (season 2)
- Country of origin: United States
- Original language: English
- No. of seasons: 2
- No. of episodes: 18

Production
- Executive producers: Dana Brunetti; John Goldwyn; Troy Searer; Andrew Sodroski; Kevin Spacey (season 1); Greg Yaitanes
- Producer: David A. Rosemont
- Production companies: Discovery Communications; Trigger Street Productions; Lionsgate Television

Original release
- Network: Discovery Channel
- Release: August 1 – September 12, 2017
- Network: Spectrum
- Release: February 3, 2020

Manhunt is an American drama anthology television series created by Andrew Sodroski, Jim Clemente, and Tony Gittelson, initially commissioned as a television miniseries. The first season, Manhunt: Unabomber, stars Sam Worthington and Paul Bettany, and depicts a fictionalized account of the FBI's hunt for the Unabomber. It premiered on Discovery Channel on August 1, 2017. On July 17, 2018, Charter Communications was in advanced negotiations with the series' producers to pick up the series for two additional seasons to be aired on their Spectrum cable service. The show's second season follows the hunt for Eric Rudolph, who was the perpetrator of the Centennial Olympic Park bombing, after suspicion initially fell on security guard Richard Jewell. The second season, Manhunt: Deadly Games, premiered on February 3, 2020.

== Cast ==
=== Unabomber ===
==== Main ====
- Sam Worthington as Jim Fitzgerald
- Paul Bettany as Ted Kaczynski
- Jeremy Bobb as Stan Cole
- Keisha Castle-Hughes as Tabby Milgrim
- Lynn Collins as Natalie Rogers
- Brían F. O'Byrne as Frank McAlpine
- Elizabeth Reaser as Ellie Fitzgerald
- Ben Weber as Andy Genelli
- Chris Noth as Don Ackerman

==== Recurring ====
- Jane Lynch as Janet Reno
- Katja Herbers as Linda Kaczynski
- Michael Nouri as Bob Guccione
- Jill Remez as Susan Mosse
- Wallace Langham as Louis Freeh
- Brian d'Arcy James as Henry Murray
- Mark Duplass as David Kaczynski
- Diesel Madkins as Ernie Esposito
- Will Murden as Sean Fitzgerald
- Carter and Colby Zier as Ryan Fitzgerald
- Jana Allen as Heidi Shumway
- Trieste Kelly Dunn as Theresa Oakes
- Griff Furst as Burkhardt
- Rebecca Henderson as Judy Clarke
- Bonnie Johnson as Wanda Kaczynski
- Steve Coulter as Anthony Bisceglie
- Mary Rachel Dudley as Lois Epstein
- Tyler Huth as Timmy Oakes
- Doug Kruse as David Gelernter
- Mike Pniewski as Charles Epstein
- Gregory Alan Williams as Garland Burrell
- McKenna Grace Martin as Joanna Epstein

=== Deadly Games ===
==== Main ====
- Cameron Britton as Richard Jewell
- Jack Huston as Eric Rudolph
- Judith Light as Bobi Jewell
- Carla Gugino as Kathy Scruggs
- Gethin Anthony as Jack Brennan
- Kelly Jenrette as Stacy Knox
- Arliss Howard as Earl Embry

==== Recurring ====
- Jay O. Sanders as Watson Bryant
- Nick Searcy as Sheriff Thompson
- Marley Shelton as Hannah Gray
- Becky Ann Baker as Patricia Rudolph
- Brad William Henke as Big John

== Episodes ==
Season	Title	Episodes	Originally released		
Season	Title	Episodes	First released	Last released	Network
1	Unabomber	8	August 1, 2017	September 12, 2017	Discovery Channel
2	Deadly Games	10	February 3, 2020		Spectrum

=== Season 1: Unabomber (2017) ===
No. overall	No. in season	Title	Directed by	Written by	Original release date	U.S. viewers (millions)
1	1	"UNABOM"	Greg Yaitanes	Andrew Sodroski	August 1, 2017	1.250
In 1995, Jim Fitzgerald graduates from the FBI's criminal profiler program and is approached by investigators from the Unabomber case after a recent bombing in Sacramento. Despite his initial reluctance to leave his family, he travels to San Francisco to join the FBI task force. Don Ackerman and Stan Cole request he build out a criminal profile for the Unabomber, who Cole believes is a low-educated airline mechanic based on the American Airlines Flight 444 bombing. Fitzgerald disagrees with their assessment and requests to create an entirely new profile. Rebuffed, Fitzgerald visits the Sacramento bomb site and argues that the bombings are not random, but the targets are signals. Again ordered to fit Cole's profile, Fitzgerald's suspicions are proven correct when the FBI receives the Unabomber manifesto. In 1997, a reclusive Fitzgerald is approached by Ackerman and Cole about interrogating the Unabomber, who has asked for him directly, but he declines. That night, he begins to burn his files and media coverage of the case, pausing on his annotated copy of the Unabomber manifesto. Departing for Stanford, he surprises his old colleague Natalie Rogers with the news of their offer.
2	2	"Pure Wudder"	Greg Yaitanes	Story by : Jim Clemente & Tony Gittelson; Teleplay by : Andrew Sodroski	August 1, 2017	1.250
Fitzgerald agitates to read the Unabomber manifesto as the FBI is provided a letter threatening to bomb a flight departing from Los Angeles. When the FBI receives a second letter implying the threat is a prank, Fitzgerald is ordered to recommend if the threat is genuine. Focusing on excessive soldering in a forensic report, he theorizes that the Unabomber is obsessed with his image and that the threat is a prank meant to maintain his power over the FBI and the public. Fitzgerald begins to read the manifesto. The next day, after a tense following of the successful airport reopening, Ackerman offers Fitzgerald his own team to examine the manifesto. Recalling a joke about his Philadelphia accent, he tasks them with finding a word or phrase that could reveal where the Unabomber is from. In 1997, on the way to interview Kaczynski, Rogers and Fitzgerald discuss what drove him from public life, which Rogers says began long before Fitzgerald joined the Unabomber investigation. Fitzgerald is asked to elicit a confession from Kaczynski to avoid the specter of a trial. The two begin to talk, but Kaczynski ends the conversation when Fitzgerald brings up a guilty plea like the FBI requested.
3	3	"Fruit of the Poisonous Tree"	Greg Yaitanes	Max Hurwitz	August 8, 2017	0.904
Fitzgerald and his team uncover distinctive language in the manifesto and hypothesize that he is older than the age range the FBI is targeting. At a roundtable with academics, he meets linguistics graduate student Natalie Rogers, who identifies the manifesto's formatting as standard for a doctoral dissertation written between 1967 and 1972. Rogers also identifies several variant word spellings as writing style used in the Chicago Tribune between 1949 and 1954. Based on these discoveries, Fitzgerald vehemently disagrees with Cole's identification of Leo Burt as prime suspect, causing his team to be disbanded. Inspired by Rogers's story about the evolution of language in early Europe, Fitzgerald fleshes out a full profile of the Unabomber, who he identifies as a highly educated, tech-avoiding loner. Cole and Ackerman ignore his profile until new Unabomber letters are delivered to the FBI. In 1993, Unabomber victim Charles Epstein is severely wounded by a package bomb sent to his home. In 1997, Fitzgerald connects the Epstein bomb's debris to the evidence seized from Kaczynski's Montana cabin and urges him to plead guilty. Kaczynski reveals that he plans to use a fruit of the poisonous tree defense, arguing the search warrant for his cabin was illegal because it was based solely on Fitzgerald's nascent forensic linguistics work. Fitzgerald, believing Kaczynski's reputation is most important to him, returns and tells him his legacy will be ruined if he pleads not guilty, but Kaczynski responds that it will be Fitzgerald's name tarnished when he walks free.
4	4	"Publish or Perish"	Greg Yaitanes	Nick Towne	August 15, 2017	0.940
In letters sent to The New York Times and The Washington Post, the Unabomber offers to stop his bombings if his manifesto is published, declining an offer to publish it in Penthouse. Fitzgerald pushes for the manifesto be published, hoping someone will recognize the writing style and name a suspect. Cole, still believing Leo Burt is the probable bomber, argues against publication. Ackerman travels to Washington D.C. to update Janet Reno and make a recommendation on the letters. Informed by Andy Genelli that the primary "Nathan R" lead the FBI has followed was actually the unrelated writings of a Times mail clerk, Ackerman recommends to Reno publishing the manifesto in the Post and conducting a massive surveillance operation in the Bay Area. Reno and FBI director Louis Freeh accept his recommendation, but make Ackerman the public face of the announcement – and bear the possible fallout. Fitzgerald's wife Ellie visits to lend him emotional support, but she is unnerved by his working relationship with Rogers. Surveillance of Post buyers at a San Francisco newsstand turn up no suspect leads. The FBI is roundly criticized for its decision and Fitzgerald is removed from the task force, returning home to a distant Ellie. In Paris, Linda Kaczynski sees a newspaper report about the manifesto's publishing. After reading it online, she urges her husband David to purchase the Post and read it.
5	5	"Abri"	Greg Yaitanes	Story by : Jim Clemente & Tony Gittelson; Teleplay by : Steven Katz	August 22, 2017	0.928
Linda shares her suspicions with David that his brother Ted may be the Unabomber. Concerned that Ted's survivalist lifestyle may cause another Ruby Ridge-type standoff, the couple meet with an attorney and anonymously provide several written letters from Ted to the FBI. Ted is ruled out as a suspect because the letter's type does not match the Unabomber letters, but Fitzgerald's old partner Tabby recognizes language similarities in the letters and faxes them to Fitzgerald, who is adamant that the writer is the Unabomber. Fitzgerald's wife kicks him out after he abandons his sons at a movie theater to review the letters. Fitzgerald visits David and shares his Unabomber profile with him, which David realizes is a near match to Ted's background and lifestyle. David provides nearly 30 years of correspondence with Ted, who brings the letters to Rogers to review together. The two definitively conclude that Ted is the Unabomber and Rogers impulsively kisses Fitzgerald, but she too kicks him out when she realizes he was more interested in getting close to the Unabomber than her. Fitzgerald presents his evidence to the task force; though Cole is skeptical that the Montana-based Kaczynski is the Unabomber, Ackerman is convinced, as it helps explain why the letters and bombs were mailed in bunches. As the original letters provided by David were confidential, Ackerman removes Tabby from the task force. The FBI begins surveilling Kaczynski's cabin in Lincoln, Montana.
6	6	"Ted"	Greg Yaitanes	Andrew Sodroski	August 29, 2017	1.114
In Lincoln, Kaczynski visits the local library as part of his regular routine and reads his manifesto in The Washington Post. He begins writing a letter to David, wondering if it is still possible for him to change and recalling his pivotal life moments. As a child in 1953, he formed a close friendship with a classmate, Doug. When Doug ends their friendship to date a girl in their class, Kaczynski wounds him with a small explosive in a note. As a 16-year-old student at Harvard in 1958, he idolized professor Henry Murray, who mentored him and discussed his ideas and beliefs at length – only for Kaczynski to be subjected to Murray's brutal psychological experiments for two years, which he alleges in the letter were related to the CIA's MKUltra program. Lastly, he recalls memories with David, including building the cabin, David firing him, and his rage at receiving David's wedding photo, considering all of these events points of betrayal. He wonders if the years he spent angry could have gone toward starting a family, dreaming of a life with a child. At his cabin, he stores a constructed bomb under his bed.
7	7	"Lincoln"	Greg Yaitanes	Story by : Nick Schenk, Jim Clemente & Tony Gittelson; Teleplay by : Nick Schenk	September 5, 2017	1.022
As surveillance of Kaczynski is put in place, Ackerman learns that Kaczynski's name has leaked to CBS News and will be publicly revealed in 24 hours. The FBI scrambles to accelerate their plans; Cole is sent to Montana to plan the raid of Kaczynski's cabin and Fitzgerald leads a team of agents reviewing his letters to build the evidence for the required search warrant, but the prosecutor refuses to submit it, citing the lack of probable cause or a "smoking gun" in the document. Nearing the deadline to begin the raid, Fitzgerald finds it: "eat your cake and have it too," a unique phrase variant found in both the manifesto and an earlier letter. The judge grants the search warrant despite the lack of precedent, citing his firsthand experiences with a Japanese soldier on Okinawa in World War II. With the assistance of a local Forest Service Ranger, Kaczynski is lured from his cabin and detained. Alone while the task force celebrates, Fitzgerald tries to contact Rogers and Ellie with the news, but is unable to reach either. David and Linda are immediately hounded by media after news of the arrest breaks. FBI investigators discover bombmaking materials in Kaczynski's cabin and he is arrested. Given a copy of the search warrant, he begins to review Fitzgerald's findings. Fitzgerald drives to Montana, arriving to a raucous celebration for Cole for making the arrest. Discouraged by Genelli taking complete credit for his forensic linguistics work, Fitzgerald visits Kaczynski's cabin and reads the original manifesto draft as Kaczynski begins annotating the search warrant.
8	8	"USA vs. Theodore J. Kaczynski"	Greg Yaitanes	Andrew Sodroski	September 12, 2017	0.930
Kaczynski's cabin is removed from the Montana wilderness. Kaczynski prepares cross-examination questions for Fitzgerald at a pretrial hearing on the legality of the search warrant, expecting the justification to be shredded under questioning. Supported by Rogers at the trial, Fitzgerald is surprised when the judge throws out the defense's motion before his testimony, but realizes Kaczynski's attorneys are planning an insanity defense. Fitzgerald brings Kaczynski to an airport hangar where his cabin is stored, saying the defense is planning to use it as an exhibit in their defense and showing him media reports from David and his attorneys claiming Kaczynski is a paranoid schizophrenic. Fitzgerald urges him to plead guilty, the only way for his legacy to stay intact, or else face rehabilitation and a rejection of his ideals. Kaczynski confronts his defense attorney, who assuages his concerns, but he discovers she has lied to him when the prosecution brings up the defense's insanity motion in court. Kaczynski attempts to have his attorneys removed. After the judge rejects his request, he attempts suicide and is rescued. With no other options to change his defense strategy or representation, Kaczynski enters a guilty plea and is sentenced to life in prison, being placed in solitary confinement at ADX Florence. Fitzgerald leaves the courthouse with Rogers, but finds himself lost in thought at a red light.

=== Season 2: Deadly Games (2020) ===
No. overall	No. in season	Title	Directed by	Written by	Original release date
9	1	"CentBom"	Michael Dinner	Andrew Sodroski	February 3, 2020
10	2	"Unabubba"	Michael Dinner	Andrew Sodroski	February 3, 2020
11	3	"Bombingham"	Jon Avnet	Denise Harkavy	February 3, 2020
12	4	"Run Rudolph Run"	Jon Avnet	Nick Towne	February 3, 2020
13	5	"Land of the Noonday Sun"	Janice Cooke	Allison Moore	February 3, 2020
14	6	"Army of God"	Janice Cooke	Nick Schenk	February 3, 2020
15	7	"Eric"	Ali Selim	Andrew Sodroski	February 3, 2020
16	8	"Join or Die"	Ali Selim	Nick Towne	February 3, 2020
17	9	"Don't Tread on Me"	Michael Dinner	Nick Schenk	February 3, 2020
18	10	"Open Season"	Michael Dinner	Allison Moore	February 3, 2020

== Production ==
The working title for the series was Manifesto, and the series order was announced in March 2016 at a presentation by Discovery Communications president Rich Ross. On May 15, 2016, Entertainment Weekly released several promotional photos, showing a first look at Paul Bettany's portrayal of Ted Kaczynski.

== Release ==
Lionsgate Home Entertainment released the entire miniseries on Blu-ray and DVD on December 26, 2017.

Netflix secured the rights to the series in November 2017. It premiered on the site on December 12, 2017, in various territories.

CBS acquired the broadcast rights to Deadly Games in August 2020, where it premiered on September 21, 2020. In December 2020, Deadly Games was added to Netflix.

== Reception ==
The review aggregator website Rotten Tomatoes reported a 93% approval rating and an average rating of 7.67/10, based on 29 reviews. The site's critics consensus reads: "Engrossing and affecting, Manhunt: Unabomber uses a taut, meticulously constructed narrative to uncover the facts behind the oft-exaggerated true story." On Metacritic, the series has a weighted average score of 71 out of 100, based on 19 critics, indicating "generally favorable reviews".

== Historical accuracy ==
=== Season 1 ===
Former FBI agent Greg Stejskal was involved in the UNABOM investigation, and he criticized the writers of the show in TheWrap, accusing them of making "a minor member" of the FBI investigative team "into the star player who won the game," referring to the show's portrayal of Jim Fitzgerald. He said that Fitzgerald never met Kaczynski, was not in Lincoln, Montana, during the time of Kaczynski's arrest (although the show does not place Fitzgerald in Lincoln at the time of Kaczynski's arrest), had no part in the search of Kaczynski's cabin, and never interviewed him.

Fitzgerald told Bustle Magazine in August 2017 that the show is in the "high 80 percentile" of accuracy, though "the Fitz character is a composite." He also stated that he had not interviewed Kaczynski, although he said that he was on his way to do so in 2007 when Kaczynski changed his mind.
