= Police precinct =

Geographic area patrolled by police

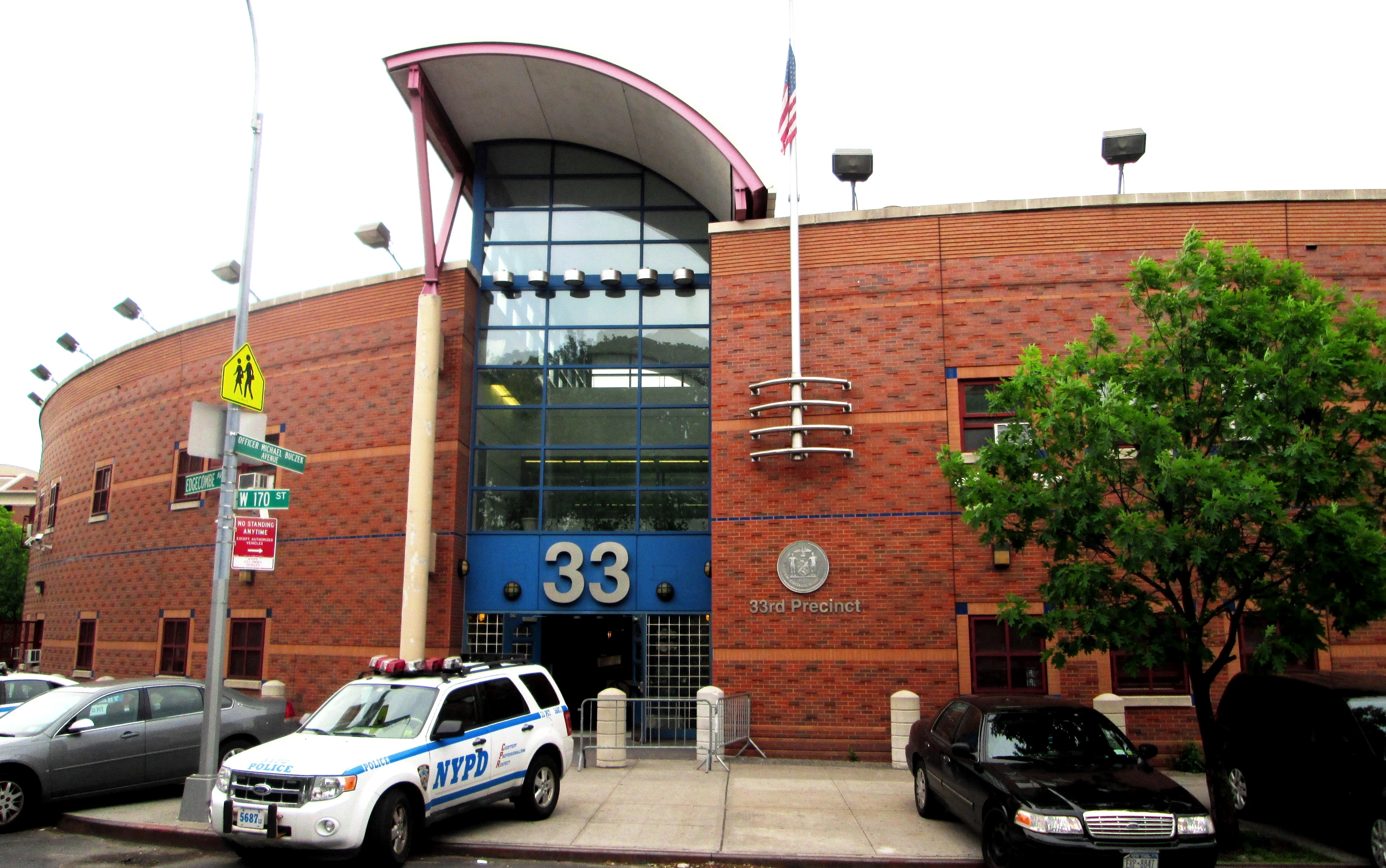
NYPD 33rd precinct in the Washington Heights neighborhood of Manhattan

In the United States, a police precinct or ward is a geographical area patrolled by a police force. The term precinct may also refer to the main police station for such a geographical area. In many countries, it is called police jurisdiction.

Practices and cultures of policing often vary considerably from one precinct to another.

Police departments using the precinct system include the following:

- New York City Police Department
- Boston Police Department – now divided into districts
- Portland Police Bureau
- Seattle Police Department
- Buffalo Police Department 1871–1995
- Detroit Police Department
- Suffolk County Police Department
- Nassau County Police Department
- Yonkers Police Department

== See also ==
- Police district
- Police division (Britain)
- Police station
