= Williamsport Police Department =

Williamsport Bureau of Police
- Common name: Williamsport Police Department
- Abbreviation: WBP

Agency overview
- Formed: 1850
- Annual budget: $9.9 million

Jurisdictional structure
- Operations jurisdiction: Williamsport, Pennsylvania, United States
- General nature: Local civilian police

Operational structure
- Headquarters: 810 Nichols Pl Williamsport, Pennsylvania
- Sworn members: 50 (as of 2024)
- Agency executive: Justin Snyder, Chief of Police

The Williamsport Bureau of Police or (WBP) is the police agency responsible for law enforcement and investigations within the City of Williamsport, Pennsylvania, the county seat of Lycoming County. The Williamsport PD is the oldest police department in Lycoming county and Central Pennsylvania (even preceding the Pennsylvania State Police). As of 2024 there was 50 active sworn police officers on the force.

== History ==
The WPD was formed in 1850, Samuel B. Coder was the then-Borough of Williamsport's first police man. Samuel Coder appears to have served in this capacity until the time that Williamsport was incorporated as a city in 1866. The City of Williamsport’s was incorporation on January 15, 1866, with city government organizing through the winter months and into the spring of 1866. Maj. James M. Wood was elected as the city’s first mayor in May 1866. Corresponding changes in city government became necessary so two bodies of councils were formed and it was decided that a regular police force was needed. The appointment of a regular police force was authorized by an Act of Assembly on March 21, 1867 and on June 4, 1866 Chief of Police Alexander M. McFadden was appointed with Samuel B. Coder, Appolos W. Grafius, and George W. Wilkinson all serving as police officers.

In the 145-year history of the city involving dedicated and professional public service to the City of Williamsport by more than 500 Officers who have donned the uniform.

== Ranks within the department ==
Title	Symbol	Uniform shirt color	Notes
Chief		White	Head of police. Appointed by city mayor
Asst. Chief		White	Appointed by city mayor
Captain		White	
Criminal Investigator		N/A	Major crime and homicide investigator
Lieutenant		Blue	Supervisor/Civil rank police officer
Sergeant		Blue	Supervisor/Civil rank police officer
Corporal		Blue	Supervisor/Civil rank police officer
Police officer		Blue	Supervisor/Civil rank police officer
Cadet		N/A	Beginner level of police agency

== Vehicles ==
- 13 Dodge Durango Special Service Package
- 1 Ford Transit (FSU Van)
- 1 Police Interceptor Utility SUV
- 2 Ford Police Interceptor's
- 3 Chevrolet Tahoe (K9 Units)

== Branches ==
- Crime Scene Unit/Forensics
- Police Patrol Division
- Criminal Investigation Division
- K-9
- Special Response Team
- School Resource Officer

== Controversy ==
=== Homicide by vehicle ===
In 2014, a Williamsport police officer named Jonathan Deprenda was traveling at 88 miles an hour when his cruiser collided with another car killing a man. State and Williamsport police say Deprenda was on his way to help another cop in a Police chase when he collided with another vehicle causing the other vehicle to catch fire. Officer Deprenda drove almost three times the posted 35 mile an hour speed limit. Later that year the officer pled guilty to Involuntary manslaughter.

== See also ==
- Lycoming County Sheriff's Office
- Law enforcement in Pennsylvania
