= State Police of Crawford and Erie Counties =

- A commemorative cemetery marker with the emblem of the State Police of Crawford and Erie Counties

Agency overview
- Formed: April 3, 1872
- Dissolved: June 30, 2005
- Volunteers: 4,000 at peak, 220 at disbandment

Jurisdictional structure
- Operations jurisdiction: Pennsylvania, USA
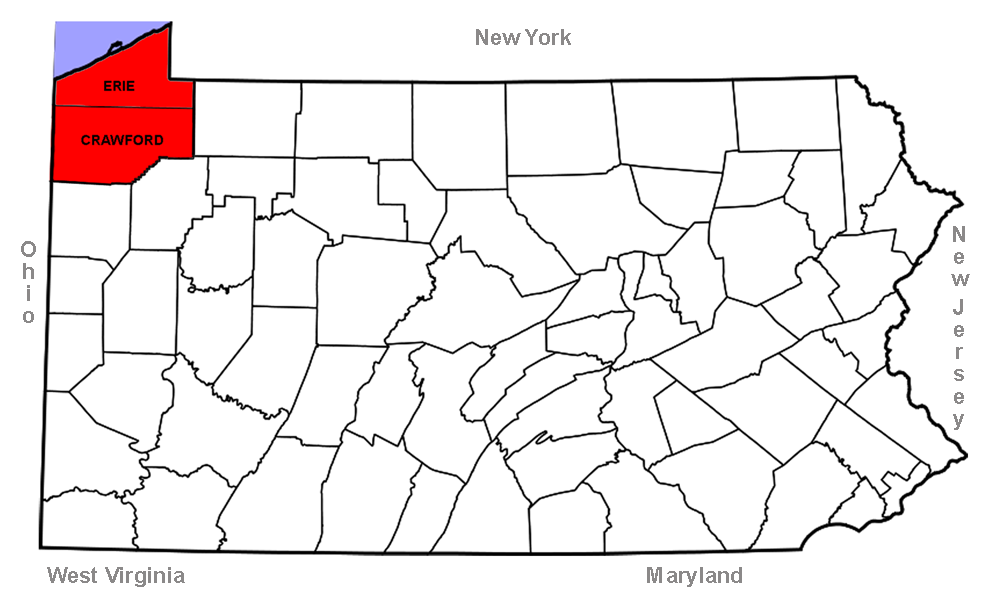
- Map of State Police of Crawford and Erie Counties's jurisdiction
- Area: 2,596 square miles (6,720 km^{2})
- Population: 299,209 (2000)
- General nature: Local civilian police

The State Police of Crawford and Erie Counties was a volunteer organization providing police service in northwest Pennsylvania. It was separate and distinct from the Pennsylvania State Police and was formally disbanded in 2005.

== History ==
The group was founded on April 3, 1872, under the name 'State Police of Crawford and Erie Counties' to recover stolen horses and detect thieves As there was no police presence in northwest Pennsylvania, the state legislature passed a law that year giving the posse full police powers – equivalent to police officers of the City of Philadelphia – "...to pursue, detain and arrest anyone committing a breach of the peace in their presence until a warrant could be lawfully obtained..." (per their official Commission as sworn officers by the State Legislature).

At its heyday, in the 1940s, the State Police of Crawford and Erie Counties had more than 4,000 members. But its ranks dwindled, and the group's duties were eventually relegated largely to crowd and traffic control at local events. Members could still carry firearms and make arrests, though many chose to simply detain suspects until the police arrived. Although maligned by some, this organization provided a valuable service to the communities of Northwest Pennsylvania by serving in times of natural disaster and civil unrest, and relieved the burden of understaffed local law enforcement (as well as the PSP "regulars") when additional manpower was crucial to keeping the peace (for example, following the killer tornadoes of Memorial Day 1985, when these officers worked 14-hour shifts for over two weeks alongside the Pennsylvania National Guard to prevent looting and other crimes. Without these volunteer police officers, the towns hit hardest by the devastation would have suffered at the hands of criminals known to be specifically targeting the area from as far away as Cleveland, Ohio). Many of its members were retired or former police officers, current sworn officers of a municipal police department, and many others paid for Act 120 police academy training themselves.

Membership in the State Police of Crawford and Erie Counties was solely decided by a three-fourths vote of its members. No training was required, though it was provided by many of the group's senior members. In defense of this fact, many Companies (the individual troops in geographical areas) within the organization had stringent criteria for membership and had required training regimens, especially for firearms qualification. The organization itself had a standing regulation requiring firearms training and annual range qualification, but enforcement was not monitored.

Most of the Companies were placed in an "inactive status" in the late 1980s due to insurance carriers of the individual Companies seriously balking at their members carrying firearms (as many private security firms have come to bear, as well). In 2005, the Pennsylvania State Police, concerned that people would mistake the volunteer group as the actual state police, convinced the state legislature to repeal the 1872 law. The group has largely disbanded, though a few members are seeking ways to keep the group active.

== See also ==
- List of law enforcement agencies in Pennsylvania

== Sources ==
- When state police aren't really state police Post-Gazette, March 10, 2005
- Legislator hopes to dissolve "other" state police Post-Gazette, March 27, 2005
- Member of Company 38, 1983 - 1987, IUP academy-trained police officer
