= Police district =

Police subdivision responsible for a certain geographic area

Police district is a form of division of a geographical area patrolled by a police force. The 1885 Encyclopædia Britannica stated:

The determination of the geographical area of a police district is necessarily governed by a variety of circumstances. Physical features have sometimes to be taken into account as affecting the demarcations of intercourse, more frequently the occupations of the people and the amount of the population. A district may be too confined or too large for police purposes. The limited ideas of simple-minded rustics of a former generation whose views of complete independence consisted in inhabiting two adjacent rooms in different parishes, so as to effectually baffle the visits of parochial officers, is probably a notion of the past; but obstructions of a like kind may arise from too narrow boundaries. On the other hand dense populations or long-accustomed limits may outweigh convenience arising from a wide area. In any case the making of altogether new boundaries merely for police purposes is very undesirable. The county, or divisions of a county or city, or the combination of parishes, ought to be and are sufficient for determining the boundaries of a police district.

== United States ==
Police forces using this format include:

- Chicago Police Department
- Baltimore Police Department
- Boston Police Department
- Milwaukee Police Department

Police forces using the term "zone" instead of "district" include:

- Atlanta Police Department
- Pittsburgh Police

== India ==
In India, a police district is an administrative and territorial jurisdiction of the state police. It is typically coterminous with a revenue district (administrative district), though this is not always the case. In large or urban areas, police district boundaries may differ from revenue districts for administrative and operational efficiency. As per the Kerala Police Act, a police district cannot extend across more than one revenue district (administrative district).

The police district is headed by a Superintendent of Police (SP) overseeing the local police administration in the designated police district, ensuring effective law enforcement, maintenance of public order, and coordination with civil authorities.

A police district is usually divided into sub-divisions, police circles, and police stations.

In metropolitan areas, the police commissionerate system exists in place of the traditional district police system and is headed by a Commissioner of Police (CP).

== See also ==
- Police precinct, a similar concept
- Regional police
- Police division
