= Wild Resource Conservation Program =

The Wild Resource Conservation Program (WRCP) is Pennsylvania’s biodiversity conservation program. As a part of the Office of Conservation Science of the Pennsylvania Department of Conservation and Natural Resources (DCNR), and working closely with the Pennsylvania Game Commission and the Pennsylvania Fish and Boat Commission, WRCP works to conserve Pennsylvania’s non-game animals, wild plants, and their habitats. Since 1982 the program has funded and facilitated hundreds of research, conservation, and education projects including the reintroduction of osprey and river otter, the ecological inventories of all 67 Pennsylvania counties, and the production of more than a dozen nature documentaries and numerous publications.

WRCP is supported by voluntary donations – it receives no general government funds.

== See also ==
- Conservation biology
- Environmental degradation
- Environmental science
- List of Pennsylvania state agencies
