= Pennsylvania Municipal Retirement System =

Public pension system in Pennsylvania

Agency overview
- Formed: 1974
- Superseding agency: Municipal Employees Retirement System Municipal Police Retirement System
- Headquarters: 1721 North Front Street; Harrisburg, Pennsylvania
- Agency executive: Barry Sherman
- Website: http://www.pmrs.state.pa.us/

Pennsylvania Municipal Retirement System (also known as PMRS) is an independent state agency of the Commonwealth of Pennsylvania that manages the public pension system for some municipal employees in Pennsylvania. It was founded in 1974.

== See also ==
- List of Pennsylvania state agencies
