= Cindy Dunn =

Pennsylvania Secretary of Conservation and Natural Resources (2015–present)

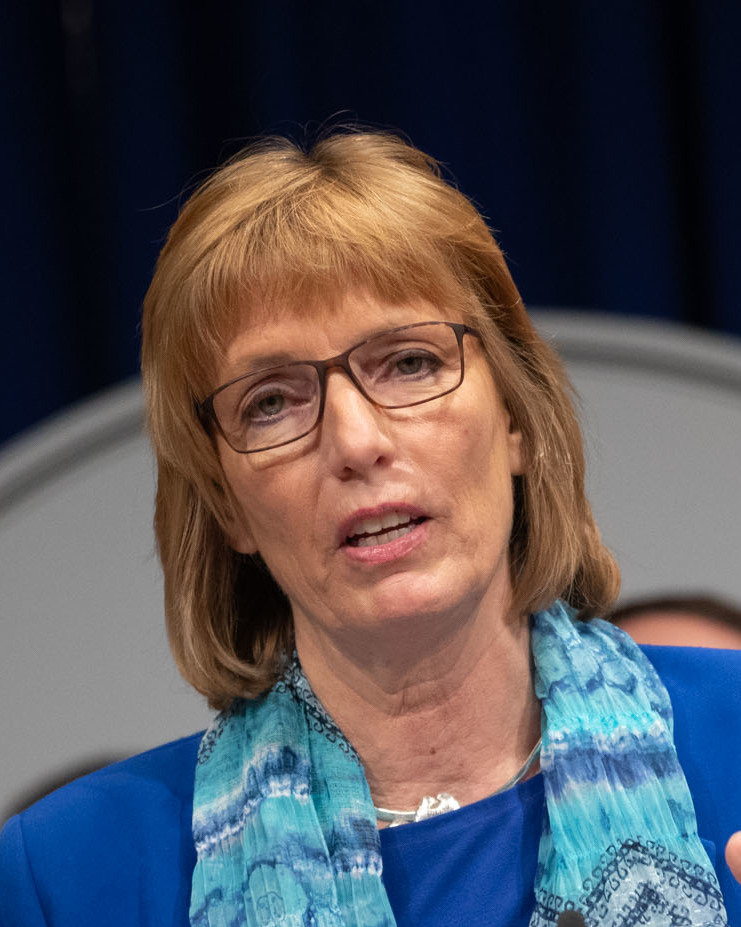
- Dunn in April 2019

Secretary of Conservation and Natural Resources of Pennsylvania
- Incumbent
- Assumed office June 2, 2015
- Governor: Tom Wolf; Josh Shapiro
- Preceded by: Ellen Ferretti

Personal details
- Education: Shippensburg University

Cindy Adams Dunn is the current Pennsylvania Secretary of Conservation and Natural Resources. She was nominated for the position in June 2015 by Pennsylvania Governor Tom Wolf.

She previously served as president and chief executive officer of PennFuture, a statewide Pennsylvania environmental advocacy organization and, prior to that as Pennsylvania Deputy Secretary of Conservation and Technical Services from 2007 until 2013.

Dunn was re-nominated for the position in 2023 by Governor Josh Shapiro and was confirmed 50-0 by the Pennsylvania State Senate on June 7.
