= Pennsylvania Office of the Budget =

PA govt office currently missing from Wikipedia

Agency overview
- Jurisdiction: State government of Pennsylvania
- Headquarters: 9th Floor, Harristown 2; 333 Market Street; Harrisburg, Pennsylvania
- Agency executive: Zachary Reber, Secretary
- Website: budget.pa.gov

The Pennsylvania Office of the Budget is an executive-level agency in Pennsylvania. The office is tasked with developing and managing a balanced financial plan for the commonwealth, aligned with the governor's policies and priorities, while ensuring compliance with laws and regulations. It oversees the annual state budget preparation and implementation, operating through the Governor's Budget Office and the Office of Comptroller Operations. Additionally, it provides administrative services such as budget management, purchasing, and payment services to the commonwealth's executive offices, and manages travel operations for all commonwealth business travelers since 2011.

== History ==
In 1923, Governor Gifford Pinchot during his first term gave an inaugural address pledging to organize state government to enhance efficiency and economy. His plans were eventually carried out in an act called the Administrative Code of 1923 which formalized the state budget process and required the Secretary of the Commonwealth to prepare the budget. In 1925, Governor Pinchot gave the first budget address to the Pennsylvania General Assembly and these addresses continue to this day. During the administration of Pinchot's successor, Governor John S. Fisher, a budget secretary was provided to help with state budget preparation. The Office of the Budget was formally established within the Governor’s Office by the Administrative Code of 1929. Constitutional changes in 1959 mandated annual sessions of the General Assembly, ending Pennsylvania's two-year budget cycle. The Code was revised again in 1961, establishing annual budgets and setting the fiscal year to begin on July 1.

== Budget impasses ==
Under current law, the governor must submit the budget to the General Assembly by the first full week of February each year or by the first full week of March if it is the governor's first term, and Pennsylvania is legally obligated to pass a balanced budget by June 30 each year. However, it has passed 13 late budgets since 2003 including four impasses that went over 100 days.

The impact of budget delays varies annually, but prolonged budget impasses can disrupt state operations significantly. Historically, Pennsylvania has experienced numerous late budgets, affecting local governments, nonprofits, and public schools that depend on state funding. During past impasses, schools canceled programs, state-subsidized pre-K programs shut down, and students at state-related universities faced delays in receiving their in-state discounts. State employees, however, continue to be paid during impasses due to a 2009 state Supreme Court ruling. While this ensures that state services like prisons and parks remain operational, it has shifted the financial strain to local levels. Former governors Ed Rendell and Tom Wolf both faced lengthy budget impasses but noted that the political and practical pressures differ depending on various factors including government division and financial deficits. During Governor Josh Shapiro's first term, there was a monthlong delay in 2023 and a four month impasse in 2025.

== See also ==
- List of Pennsylvania state agencies
