= James R. Fitzgerald =

American criminal profiler, forensic linguist, and author (born 1953)

- Born: June 24, 1953 (age 73); Philadelphia, Pennsylvania
- Police career
- Department: Bensalem Township Police Department; Federal Bureau of Investigation
- Service years: 1976–2007
- Status: Retired
- Rank: Supervisory Special Agent
- Other work: Consultant
- Website: jamesrfitzgerald.com

James R. Fitzgerald (born June 24, 1953) is an American criminal profiler, forensic linguist, and author. He is a retired FBI agent and best known for his role in the UNABOM investigation, which resulted in the arrest and conviction of Ted Kaczynski.

== Law enforcement career ==
Fitzgerald's career in law enforcement began in 1976 as a police officer in Bensalem Township, Pennsylvania. In 1987, after eleven years of local police work culminating in his promotion to the rank of sergeant, he was recruited by the Federal Bureau of Investigation. Upon graduation from the FBI Academy in Quantico, Virginia, Fitzgerald was assigned to the New York Field Division's Joint Bank Robbery Task Force. In 1995, Fitzgerald was promoted to Criminal Profiler at the National Center for the Analysis of Violent Crime, which would later become the FBI's Behavioral Analysis Unit, or BAU. Through myriad investigations of homicide, serial rape, extortion, kidnapping, and workplace violence, Fitzgerald refined his skills in forensic linguistics and threat assessment, specialties that were used in the UNABOM investigation. In an interview with NPR, Fitzgerald said the Unabomber's writings were a "pivotal factor" in cracking the Unabomber's case. He further claimed that he and his colleagues used the writing in the Unabomber Manifesto to help pinpoint the age and geographic origin of their suspect.

Fitzgerald was also responsible for developing training programs and tools to improve the threat assessment capabilities of the FBI. Among these is the Communicated Threat Assessment Database (CTAD), an exhaustively indexed repository of data consisting of every communicated threat encountered in the course of FBI investigations.

== Later career ==
Fitzgerald has remained active in the fields of criminal profiling and forensic linguistics since retiring from the FBI in 2007, holding positions as adjunct faculty at both Hofstra University in Hempstead, New York, Stockton University in Pomona, New Jersey, and California University of Pennsylvania in California, Pennsylvania. He continues to work as a private consultant and technical advisor to free media productions, such as Criminal Minds and Sleepy Hollow. Fitzgerald served as a consulting producer in the Discovery Channel's 2017 miniseries Manhunt: Unabomber, which features actor Sam Worthington as James "Fitz" Fitzgerald, described by Fitzgerald as "a composite character" of many investigators in the Unabomber case.

== Television ==
- A&E's Killer Profile – Executive Producer and Co-Host
- CBS TV’s The Case of: Jon Benet Ramsey – on-air expert
- CBS TV's Criminal Minds – Technical Advisor
- Discovery Channel’s Manhunt: Unabomber – Consulting Producer

== Publications ==
- 2003: "Workplace violence: from threat to intervention", in Clinics in Occupational and Environmental Medicine
- 2004: "Using A Forensic Linguistic Approach to Track the Unabomber", in Profilers, Campbell, John H., and DeNevi, Don, Prometheus Books
- 2006: Forensic Linguistic Services at the Behavioral Analysis Unit-1, an FBI handbook detailing services offered at the BAU-1
- 2007: "The FBI's Communicated Threat Assessment Database; History, Design, and Implementation", in FBI Law Enforcement Bulletin
- 2014: A Journey to the Center of the Mind, Book I, The Coming-of-Age Years, Infinity Publishing
- 2017: A Journey to the Center of the Mind, Book II, The Police Officer Years, Infinity Publishing
- 2017: A Journey to the Center of the Mind, Book III, The (First Ten) FBI Years, Infinity Publishing
