= A Journey to the Center of the Mind =

Book series by James R. Fitzgerald

A Journey to the Center of the Mind (JCM) is a book series authored by James R. Fitzgerald, retired FBI agent, criminal profiler and forensic linguist. The series, published by Infinity Publishing between 2014 and 2017, consists of three volumes detailing chronologically the life and career circumstances that led to Jim Fitzgerald's involvement in the FBI's UNABOM investigation, which ultimately resulted in the arrest and prosecution of Theodore Kaczinski, also known as the Unabomber.

== JCM Book I: The Coming-of-Age Years (2014) ==
The first volume of the series is an account of Fitzgerald's early years, from childhood to his graduation from the Police Academy. The book describes various formative relationships and encounters with friends (including a future convicted killer), law breakers, and police—influences that set him on a path toward a long and successful career in law enforcement.

== JCM Book II: The Police Officer Years (2017) ==
The second book in the series recounts Fitzgerald's most significant experiences as a police officer in Bensalem Township, Pennsylvania, from his first night on patrol—a "trial by fire" that resulted in headlines—to his initiation into the politics of the legal system. JCM II chronicles the investigations, arrests, and prosecutions that led to Fitzgerald's promotion to sergeant and ultimately his recruitment to the Federal Bureau of Investigation.

== JCM Book III: The (First Ten) FBI Years (2017) ==
The third volume resumes the story of Fitzgerald's progression in law enforcement, beginning with his time at the FBI Academy in Quantico, Virginia before proceeding to his first assignment at the New York Field Division's highly respected Joint Bank Robbery Task Force, where his participation in the arrests of robbers, kidnappers, extortionists, murderers, and pedophiles eventually resulted in promotion to Criminal Profiler at the National Center for the Investigation of Violent Crime, which would later give rise to the FBI's Behavioral Analysis Unit (BAU). The book concludes with the account of Fitzgerald's first assignment as a profiler with the UNABOM Task Force in San Francisco, California, where his skills in forensic linguistics were instrumental in the arrest and successful prosecution of the Unabomber, Theodore Kaczynski, hence resolving what had been the most prolonged and expensive investigation in the history of the FBI.
