= Pennsylvania budget impasses =

Series of budget impasses

Pennsylvania budget impasses are a series of budget impasses or fiscal crises that pertain to the Commonwealth of Pennsylvania, the latest of which is occurring during negotiations of the 2025-2026 state budget.

When elected officials at the state government level have been unable to pass annual budgets after repeated votes in the Pennsylvania General Assembly in previous years, the budget processes have stalled and, in several cases, reached impasses, during which times the commonwealth was unable to pay its bills or payrolls. When these impasses continued for extended periods of time, commonwealth employees, residents receiving government assistance and businesses that were scheduled to be paid for providing services to the government and commonwealth residents frequently faced financial hardship.

== Background ==
The Pennsylvania Constitution requires the adoption of a budget by midnight June 30 each year, the last day in the fiscal year. There were seven consecutive budget impasses in Pennsylvania between 2003 and 2009, with tensions between Democratic Governor Ed Rendell and the Republican-controlled State Senate delaying the passage of annual budgets. While the trend was broken for several years after 2009, conflicts between the Legislature and the Governor led to subsequent budget impasses in 2014 and 2015.

== Past budget impasses ==
=== 2007 ===
The 2007 budget impasse lasted nine days, when it concluded with Governor Ed Rendell and the Republican-controlled state Senate finally agreeing on a $27.17 billion (~$39.5 billion in 2024) budget. Approximately 24,000 state employees, who were considered non-essential, were furloughed for one day during the impasse.

=== 2008 ===
In 2008, three state employee unions (AFSCME, SEIU Local 668 and FOSCEP) sought a declaration from the Supreme Court of Pennsylvania that "the Governor's furlough plan is not "legally required" by Article III, Section 24 of the Pennsylvania Constitution and the FLSA, as the Governor's Office has asserted in public statements." The Governor, Ed Rendell, and Treasurer, Robin Wiessmann, filed a cross-application for summary relief, asking the Court to indicate that paying state employees outside the budget is not allowed by state law.

=== 2009 ===
In 2009, the state had a $3.3 billion (~$4.68 billion in 2024) budget deficit, with twenty-four year term State Rep. Edward G. Staback stating at the time that, "It is probably the worst I have ever seen." Governor Rendell proposed an increase of 16% in the state's personal income tax and $72 million in cuts to balance the budget. Republican lawmakers and some Democrats have insisted on there being no new taxes. This disagreement over the state's budget created the impasse.

Instead of implementing furloughs like previous years, all Pennsylvania state employees were required to continue working through the budget impasse. The majority of these employees will not be paid until after the new budget is adopted.

During the impasse, almost 16,000 state workers took advantage of low interest loans to provide for expenses while they were without paychecks.

=== 2014 ===
The first and only budget impasse that occurred during the Tom Corbett administration took place during the negotiations over the 2014-2015 state budget. The fiscal year elapsed without a signed budget, as Corbett withheld his signature from a $29.1 billion budget passed by the Republican-controlled legislature, citing the absence of pension reform. The impasse ended on July 10, when Corbett ultimately signed the Legislature's budget proposal, which continued to lack pension reform. When signing the budget, the Governor used his line item veto power to cut $65 million, or 20 percent, of the Legislature's operating budget, a move that drew criticism from state lawmakers.

=== 2015 ===
Governor Tom Wolf vetoed the entire budget in June. Later in September, Wolf vetoed a stop gap budget passed by the Republican Legislature stating "Republican leaders passed a stopgap budget that once again sells out the people of Pennsylvania to oil and gas companies and Harrisburg special interests".

On December 29, 2015, Wolf signed a $23.4 billion spending plan, which line-item-vetoed more than $6.8 billion from the legislature's second full budget proposal. Later in March, the $30 billion budget from the Republican-controlled legislature became law when Wolf announced he would neither sign nor reject the proposal.

=== 2017 ===
Wolf signed off on a $32 billion budget on October 30, four months after the deadline. The delay was in part due to disagreements over gambling and how to fill a $2.2 billion budget gap.

=== 2022 ===
Lawmakers missed the 2022-2023 state budget deadline by a week. Funding for Pennsylvania's state-related universities and was reportedly among the reasons for the delay.

=== 2023 ===
After months of negotiations, state lawmakers agreed to a budget in December 2023, significantly past the June 30 deadline. Major points of contention were a Republican-backed private school voucher program, which was vetoed by Governor Josh Shapiro The final budget increased the child care tax credit, funded the state's first public legal defense program, and provided stipends for student teachers.

=== 2024 ===
Shapiro signed the $47.6 billion 2024-2025 state budget into law on July 11, a week and a half after the June 30 deadline. Lawmakers reportedly could not come to an agreement on public school funding before the deadline.

=== 2025 ===
Shapiro signed a $50.1 billion budget deal on November 12, well over four months after the deadline.

== See also ==
- Pennsylvania Office of the Budget
