= Pennridge Regional Police =

Coordinates: 40.37360°N 75.31808°W

Pennridge Regional Police patch

The Pennridge Regional Police is a regional police force covering East and West Rockhill Townships in Bucks County, Pennsylvania. It is headquartered at 200 Ridge Rd. Sellersville, Pennsylvania. The current Police Chief is Paul T. Dickinson Jr.

In 2016, the Department consists of 10 sworn officers and one administrative assistant.

== Services ==
The department provides:

- Patrol and response
- Traffic Safety and Accident Reconstruction Unit
- Criminal Investigation Unit
- Tactical Team and Youth Services Unit
- Youth Aid Panel

== Pennridge Regional Police Commission ==
The three person Pennridge Regional Police commission has general oversight over the Pennridge Regional Police Department. These are the current Commissioners:

1. Gary Volovnik, East Rockhill Township Representative
2. Hal Schirmer, West Rockhill Township Representative
3. Jay Keyser, West Rockhill Township Representative

== History ==
The Pennridge Regional Police was formed in 1992 to provide police services to East and West Rockhill Townships, and Sellersville Borough. Sellersville is now covered by the Perkasie Borough Police Department.
