= You can't have your cake and eat it =

English idiomatic proverb

You can't have your cake and eat it (too) is a popular English idiomatic proverb or figure of speech. The phrase literally means "you cannot simultaneously consume and retain possession of a cake", but the proverb is implying a simpler concept: Once the cake is eaten, it is gone. This reference is used in situations where one desires two incompatible things, or where one should not try to have more than is reasonable. The proverb's meaning is similar to the phrases "you can't have it both ways" and "you can't have the best of both worlds."

To the unfamiliar, the proverb may sound confusing due to the ambiguity of the word 'have', which can mean 'keep' or 'to have in one's possession', but which can also be used as a synonym for 'eat' (e.g. 'to have breakfast'). Some find the common form of the proverb to be incorrect or illogical and instead prefer: "You can't eat your cake and [then still] have it (too)". Indeed, this used to be the most common form of the expression until the 1930s–1940s, when it was overtaken by the have-eat variant. Another, less common, version uses 'keep' instead of 'have'.

Choosing between having and eating a cake illustrates the concept of trade-offs or opportunity cost.

== History and usage ==
An early recording of the phrase is in a letter on 14 March 1538 from Thomas, Duke of Norfolk, to Thomas Cromwell, as "a man can not have his cake and eat his cake". The phrase occurs with the clauses reversed in John Heywood's A dialogue Conteinyng the Nomber in Effect of All the Prouerbes in the Englishe Tongue from 1546, as "wolde you bothe eate your cake, and have your cake?". In John Davies's Scourge of Folly of 1611, the same order is used, as "A man cannot eat his cake and haue it stil."

In Jonathan Swift's 1738 farce Polite Conversation, the character Lady Answerall says "she cannot eat her cake and have her cake". In a posthumous adaptation of Polite Conversation, called Tittle Tattle; or, Taste A-la-Mode, released in 1749, the order was reversed: "And she cannot have her Cake and eat her Cake". A modern-sounding variant from 1812, "We cannot have our cake and eat it too", can be found in R. C. Knopf's Document Transcriptions of the War of 1812 (1959).

According to Google Ngram Viewer, a search engine that charts the frequencies of phrases in archived historical (written) documents over time, the eat-have order used to be the most common variant, before being surpassed by the have-eat version in the 1930s and 40s. An example of this is Ayn Rand's 1957 novel Atlas Shrugged, in which the have-eat variant is used three times.

In 1996, the proverb played a role in the apprehension of Ted Kaczynski, also known as the Unabomber. In his manifesto, which the terrorist sent to newspapers in the wake of his bombings, Kaczynski advocated the undoing of the industrial revolution, writing: "As for the negative consequences of eliminating industrial society — well, you can’t eat your cake and have it too." James R. Fitzgerald, an FBI forensic linguist, noted the then-uncommon variant of the proverb and later discovered that Kaczynski had also used it in a letter to his mother. This, among other clues, led to his identification and arrest.

Anarcho-capitalist economist Hans-Hermann Hoppe used the proverb in his 2001 book Democracy: The God That Failed, writing: "You cannot have your cake and eat it too for instance, or what you consume now cannot be consumed again in the future."

In her 2002 book, classicist Katharina Volk of Columbia University used the phrase to describe the development of poetic imagery in didactic Latin poetry, naming the principle behind the imagery's adoption and application the "have-one's-cake-and-eat-it-too principle".

=== Cakeism ===
The expression “cakeism” and the associated noun and adjective “cakeist” have come into general use in British English, especially in political journalism, and have been accepted into English dictionaries.

The expressions, which reverse the traditional proverb, refer to a wish to enjoy two desirable but incompatible alternatives, especially regarding the UK’s approach to Brexit negotiations and subsequent deliberations. It developed after comments made by the then UK foreign secretary Boris Johnson in 2016, that "I've never been an Outer", and "My policy on cake is pro having it and pro eating it." Subsequently, as prime minister, he described the UK's post-Brexit trade deal as a "cakeist treaty". The neologisms have since become objects of derision and have led to sarcastic re-reversals.

"Cakeism" has also been used to describe inconsistent positions held by the Scottish National Party, for example, arguing for a low-tax, high-public spending economy in an independent Scotland, or seeking to retain relationships with the UK that would be incompatible with its aspiration for European Union membership.

== Linguistic logicality ==
The proverb, while commonly used, is at times questioned by people who feel the expression to be illogical or incorrect. As comedian Billy Connolly once put it: "What good is [having] a cake if you can't eat it?" According to Paul Brians, Professor of English at Washington State University, the idiom confuses many people because the verb to have, can refer to possessing, but also to eating, e.g. "Let's have breakfast" or "I'm having a sandwich". Brians also argues that "You can't eat your cake and have it too" is a more logical variant than "You can't have your cake and eat it too", because the verb-order of "eat-have" makes more sense: once you've eaten your cake, you don't have it anymore.

Ben Zimmer, writing for the Language Log of the University of Pennsylvania, states that the interpretation of the two variants relies on the assumption of either sequentiality or simultaneity. If one believes the phrase to imply sequentiality, then the "eat-have" variant could be seen as a more logical form: you cannot eat your cake and then (still) have it, but you actually can have your cake and then eat it. Thus, "can't eat and (then) have" would be a correct statement, "can't have and (then) eat" would be an incorrect statement. However, if one believes the "and" conjoining the verbs to imply simultaneity of action rather than sequentiality of action, then both versions are usable as an idiom, because "cake-eating and cake-having are mutually exclusive activities, regardless of the syntactic ordering", Zimmer writes.

In response, Richard Mason disagreed with Zimmer's assertion on the mutually exclusiveness of the two actions: "simultaneous cake-having and cake-eating are NOT mutually exclusive. On the contrary, generally I cannot eat something at any time when I do not have it. But I eat things when I have them all the time. Only when the object is entirely consumed do I no longer have it (and at that time the eating is also terminated)." Therefore, Mason considers the "have-eat" variant to be "logically indefensible". Zimmer reacted to Mason by stating: "the 'having' part of the idiom seems to me to imply possession over a long period of time, rather than the transient cake-having that occurs during cake-eating". He concludes that it is ultimately not relevant to ponder over the logicality of crystallized, commonly used phrases. "Few people protest the expression head over heels to mean 'topsy-turvy,' despite the fact that its "literal" reading describes a normal, non-topsy-turvy bodily alignment".

Stan Carey, writing for the Macmillan Dictionary Blog, likens the "have-eat" vs. "eat-have" question with the discussion over "I could care less" and "I couldn't care less", two phrases that are used to refer to the same thing yet are construed differently, the former sounding illogical because saying "I could care less" would mean that you actually do care to some degree. Carey writes that even though the "eat-have" form of the cake-proverb might make more sense, "idioms do not hinge on logic, and expecting them to make literal sense is futile. But it can be hard to ward off the instinctive wish that language align better with common sense." Carey jokingly states that the cake-idiom actually does have its cake and eats it.

== See also ==
- Let them eat cake
