= Pennsylvania Natural Heritage Program =

Founded in 1982, the Pennsylvania Natural Heritage Program (PNHP) gathers and manages information regarding the status and location of the Commonwealth of Pennsylvania’s rare species and habitats and native natural communities. PHNP's goal is to build, maintain, and provide accurate and accessible ecological information needed for conservation, development planning and natural resource management.

PNHP works with the Western Pennsylvania Conservancy, Pennsylvania Department of Conservation and Natural Resources (DCNR), the Pennsylvania Fish and Boat Commission, and the Pennsylvania Game Commission.

One important initiative within the Heritage Program is the County Natural Heritage Inventory, which conducts county-wide inventories of threatened and endangered species as well as important natural areas. At present, completed county inventories are available for 57 counties and the remaining 10 are in progress. In addition, PNHP will return to counties and perform updates to ensure that county inventory data remains relatively current.

The PNHP has approximately 50 staff among the four partner programs, including botanists, vertebrate and invertebrate zoologists, aquatic and terrestrial ecologists, data managers and GIS specialists as well as environmental review staff. The PNHP Director and Program Manager are in the Office of Conservation Science and act as liaisons between the program partner agencies and provide leadership for program strategic direction and everyday program management.

== See also ==
- Biodiversity
- Conservation biology
