= Regional police =

Regional police are multijurisdictional police forces which cover at least two administrative divisions.

== Canada ==
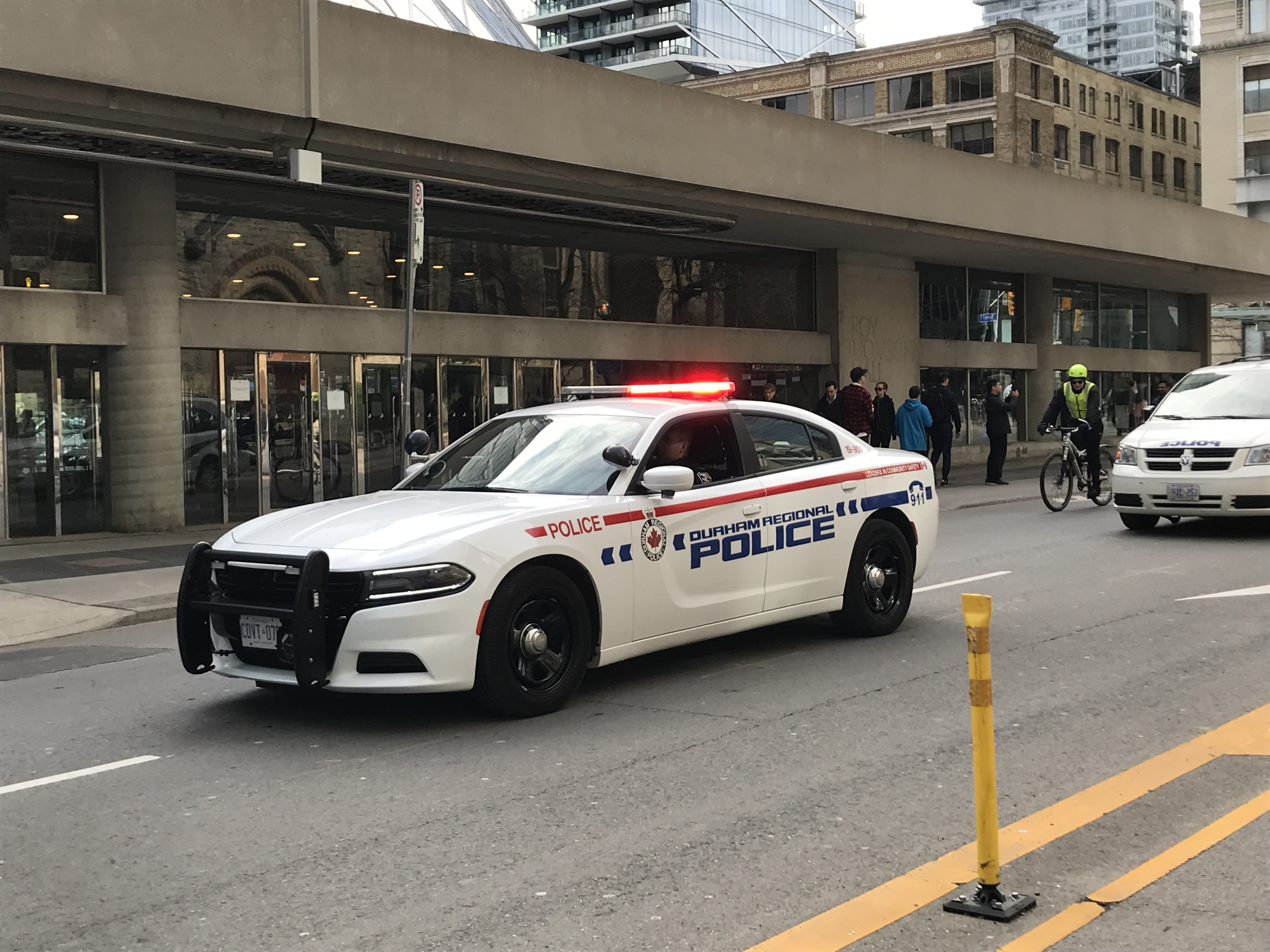
A Durham Regional Police car participates in the Law Enforcement Torch Run for the Ontario Special Olympics in 2019.

In Canada, there are three main types of regional police force. There are those that are operated by regional municipalities in the provinces of Ontario and Quebec; those shared by two independent municipalities, such as the Kennebecasis Regional Police Force; and those that are operated by a single municipality but contracted to serve other municipalities, like the Victoria Police Department and Thunder Bay Police Service. Many Indigenous communities are too small to sustain independent police forces — the Canadian reserve system operated on the assumption that Indigenous families required less land than settler families and routinely gave away reserve lands to settlers without Indigenous consultation or consent — and several instead maintain regional police agencies, either by contracting police services out to a neighbouring municipal police force or by sharing police services with several other First Nations or Indigenous communities.

There are several police services in Nova Scotia that have "regional" in their name and serve regional municipalities, but they are not regional police forces in the traditional sense. While regional municipalities in Ontario and Quebec form an "upper tier" (county level) of government, coordinating services like police and transit for several constituent municipalities, Nova Scotia regional municipalities are "single tier," handling all of the municipal services for a large area with no constituent or subordinate municipalities. Not every regional police force in Nova Scotia serves a regional municipality, however — the New Glasgow Regional Police Service serves two towns in Pictou County, New Glasgow and Trenton. Some police forces in Ontario — such as the Toronto Police Service, Ottawa Police Service, and Greater Sudbury Police Service — had originally been regional police services, but ceased to function as true regional police agencies after the regional municipalities that they served were amalgamated into single-tier cities.

The adoption of regional policing in Canada has been controversial. A 2016 review of nine mid-sized and large Canadian police services found no significant differences existed in cost or service quality between regional and non-regional police forces, and a literature review in 2015 found that larger police services are less effective and more expensive compared to mid-sized forces.

=== List of regional police services ===
- Anishinabek Police Service
- BNPP Regional Police
- Delta Police Department
- Durham Regional Police Service
- Eeyou Eenou Police Force
- Halton Regional Police Service
- Kennebecasis Regional Police Force
- Lakeshore Regional Police Service
- Manitoba First Nations Police
- New Glasgow Regional Police
- Niagara Regional Police Service
- Nishnawbe-Aski Police Service
- Nunavik Police Service
- Peel Regional Police
- South Simcoe Police Service
- Straford Police Service
- Thunder Bay Police Service
- Treaty Three Police Service
- Vancouver Police Department
- Victoria Police Department
- Waterloo Regional Police Service
- Windsor Police Service
- York Regional Police

== United States ==
=== Nevada ===
- Las Vegas Metropolitan Police Department

=== New Jersey ===
- Camden County Police Department - despite the name is not an actual regional police as the only member community is the City of Camden. The CCPD does receive half of its funding from County of Camden.

=== New York ===
- Nassau County Police Department
- Suffolk County Police Department

=== Pennsylvania ===
Through the formation of a "police district" under the control of a Police Commission, some municipalities in Pennsylvania have found that improved and more professional police services could be obtained through inter-governmental cooperation. Having one police department covering two or more neighboring communities, rather than separate police departments, allows each municipality to enjoy the benefits of a larger department, such as specialized units and a professional staff.

- Central Berks Regional Police
- Central Bucks Regional Police
- Colonial Regional Police
- Eastern Adams County Regional Police
- Eastern Pike County Regional Police
- Mifflin County Regional Police
- Northeastern York County Regional Police
- Northern Berks Regional Police
- Northern Regional Police Department
- Northern York County Regional Police
- Pennridge Regional Police
- Pocono Mountain Regional Police
- Slate Belt Regional Police
- Southern York Regional Police
- Southwestern York County Regional Police
- Stroud Area Regional Police
- Upper Perk Police District
- West Hills Regional Police
- West Shore Regional Police
- Westtown East Goshen Regional Police
- York Area Regional Police
- Berks-Lehigh Regional Police (defunct)
- Brandywine Regional Police (defunct)

=== Tennessee ===
- Metropolitan Nashville Police Department

== See also ==
- Police district
