= Pennsylvania Board of Probation and Parole =

State agency in Pennsylvania

Pennsylvania Parole Board
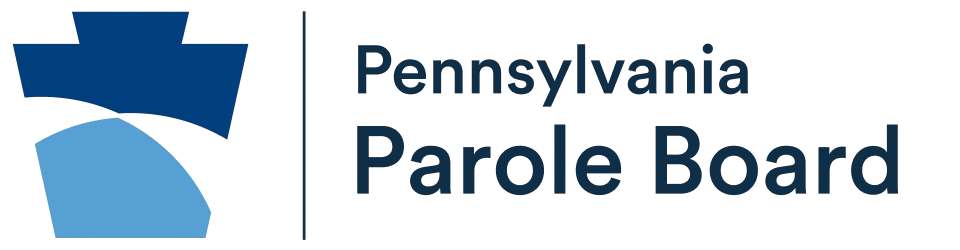

Agency overview
- Formed: 1941
- Jurisdiction: State government of Pennsylvania
- Headquarters: Harrisburg, Pa
- Agency executive: Ted Johnson, Chairman
- Website: https://www.parole.pa.gov

The Pennsylvania Parole Board is a cabinet-level independent agency in Pennsylvania. The board is charged with overseeing certain offenders who have been offered an early release from incarceration or who have been granted probation in lieu of a prison sentence.

== Purpose ==
The agency operates 49 offices and works in tandem with the similar county agencies that manage the cases of individuals convicted of less severe crimes. The board works to provide offenders with an opportunity to reintegrate into the community, and it strives to reduce recidivism rates.

The Pennsylvania Parole Board (Board) is committed to protecting the safety of the public, addressing the needs of crime victims, improving county adult probation and parole services and assisting in the fair administration of justice by ensuring the custody, control, and treatment of offenders under the jurisdiction of the Board. There has been some controversy surrounding the methods of the parole board following the Michael Ballard murders.

== See also ==
- List of Pennsylvania state agencies
