= Bensalem Township Police Department =

Bensalem Police Department
- Abbreviation: BPD
- Motto: Protect with Honor, Serve with Pride

Agency overview
- Formed: 1951

Jurisdictional structure
- Operations jurisdiction: Bucks County, Pennsylvania, United States
- General nature: Local civilian police

Operational structure
- Headquarters: Bensalem Township Municipal Building 2400 Byberry Rd
- Police Officers: 100+
- Agency executive: Frederick Harran, Director of Public Safety
- Departments: List: Patrol Division; Motor Patrol Division; k-9; Accident Investigation; Criminal Investigations; Special Victims Unit; Special Investigations Unit; SWAT; Honor Guard; PAL; Explorers; Townwatch

Website
- bensalempolice.org

The Bensalem Police Department is the police department in Bensalem Township, Bucks County, Pennsylvania. It was established in 1951. The department has about 100 sworn officers and fifty support employees. It is one of the fifteen largest police departments in Pennsylvania.

== Present-day Bensalem Police Department ==
The department's staff includes a deputy director and five sworn officers in the rank of lieutenant. Frederick Harran, Bensalem’s director of public safety believed the "number of officers is still low compared to other towns of similar geographic and population sizes".

In December 2019, Bensalem Police hosted a public safety luncheon toy drive where toys are collected for needy families in the township.

=== Divisions ===
The department includes a number of divisions; Patrol Division, with about 64 officers. Motor Patrol, with five officers who use motorcycles and all-terrain vehicles. K-9 with five officers handling five dogs. Explorers, a branch of the Boy Scouts of America.

=== Twitter Presence ===
In April 2021 the Police Department posted an infamous tweet asking members of the public to submit photographs (via a website) of children on bicycles who were "causing traffic issues". The tweet and the policy received widespread condemnation.

== History ==
Established in 1951 when Bensalem Township had 11,500 residents, the Bensalem Police began with one car and two police officers. By the 1970s, the department had grown rapidly numbering about 29 officers. Over the years, the department has retired over 28 police dogs, and has grown to over 100 officers. It is ranked in the top 15 in Pennsylvania police departments.

Officers killed in the line of duty
Officer	Date of death	Details
James Kenneth Armstrong	April 15, 1975	Shot
Robert N. Yezzi	August 12, 1980	Struck by car
