= Pennsylvania Fish and Boat Commission =

U.S. state fishing and boating regulatory agency

Agency overview
- Formed: 1866
- Jurisdiction: Government of Pennsylvania
- Headquarters: 1601 Elmerton Avenue; Harrisburg, Pennsylvania, U.S.
- Agency executives: Eric C. Hussar, President of Commissioners; Timothy D. Schaeffer, Executive Director
- Website: https://www.fishandboat.com/

The Pennsylvania Fish and Boat Commission is an independent state agency responsible for the regulation of all fishing and boating in the state of Pennsylvania within the United States of America. Unlike many U.S. states, Pennsylvania has a separate Game Commission.

Its mission is: to protect, conserve, and enhance the Commonwealth's aquatic resources and provide fishing and boating opportunities.

== History ==
Created by a law that was signed on March 23, 1866 by Governor Andrew Curtin, this state agency's main purpose was to restore fish migrations of American shad within the rivers. Today, its scope manages boat launches, waterways, fish hatcheries, and other properties used for recreational fishing and boating.

It also regulates the accessibility through dams on major waterways via fish ladders. Ten members make up the Board of Commissioners who oversee all operations, serving 8-year terms without pay. Among others, the Commission employs waterway conservation officers and biologists, while also utilizing deputy conservation officers and volunteer instructors to serve the public. The conservation officers are assigned to various districts across the Commonwealth, where—in addition to fish and boat law enforcement—they conduct boating and fishing schools, fish stocking, public relations work, and investigate water pollution violations.

The Commission's first fishing license was issued in 1922, and licenses have been issued annually since that time. In 2007, the licensing process was converted to a Point of Sale computerized system with licenses valid on December 1 of the preceding year until December 31 of the license year.

This agency also issues boat registrations for two-year periods, expiring on March 31 of the year of expiration. Because the agency is a commission, the revenues it collects from license purchases directly benefits the protection and conservation of aquatic resources. The agency is not supported by general fund state-tax money, but the Commission does receive a portion of federal excise taxes through sporting goods and marine fuel taxation.

== Law enforcement ==
Fishing and boating regulations are enforced by Waterways Conservation Officers. WCOs are employed by the Fish and Boating Commission and are police officers certified by the Pennsylvania State Police Municipal Police Officers Training Standards. Officers patrol on foot, in vehicles and on boats, and are certified boating safety instructors. Training consists of 26 weeks basic police officer training, followed by a further 26 weeks specialist training for the role.

== See also ==
- List of law enforcement agencies in Pennsylvania
- List of Pennsylvania state agencies
- Pennsylvania Natural Heritage Program
