= Government of Pennsylvania =

- Logo of the Pennsylvanian government Great Seal of the Commonwealth of Pennsylvania
- Polity type: Presidential republic Federated state
- Constitution: Constitution of Pennsylvania

Legislative branch
- Name: General Assembly
- Type: Bicameral
- Meeting place: Pennsylvania State Capitol
- Upper house
- Name: Senate
- Presiding officer: Austin Davis, President
- Lower house
- Name: House of Representatives
- Presiding officer: Joanna McClinton, Speaker

Executive branch
- Head of state and government
- Title: Governor
- Currently: Josh Shapiro
- Appointer: Election
- Cabinet
- Name: Cabinet
- Leader: Governor
- Deputy leader: Lieutenant Governor
- Headquarters: State Capitol

Judicial branch
- Name: Unified Judicial System of Pennsylvania
- Courts: Courts of Pennsylvania
- Supreme Court of Pennsylvania
- Chief judge: Debra Todd
- Seat: Harrisburg, Philadelphia, Pittsburgh

The Government of the Commonwealth of Pennsylvania is the governmental structure of the Commonwealth of Pennsylvania as established by the Constitution of Pennsylvania. It is composed of three branches: executive, legislative and judicial. The state capital of Pennsylvania is Harrisburg.

== Executive branch ==
The term for all elected members of the executive branch is four years, with a maximum of two terms. All members of the executive branch are not on the ballot in the same year: elections for governor and lieutenant governor are held in even years when there is not a presidential election, while the other three statewide offices are elected in presidential election years.

The elected officers are:

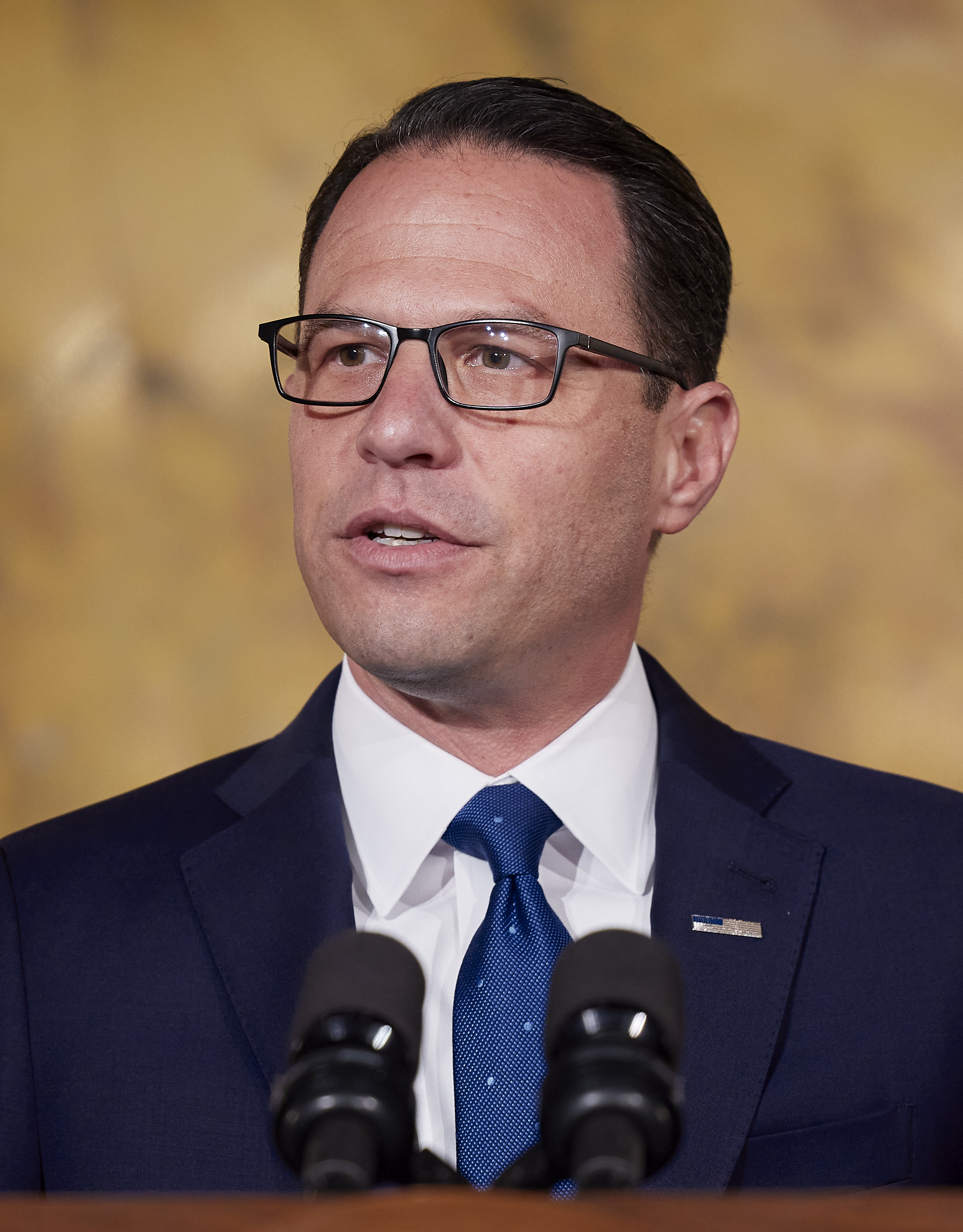
Josh Shapiro (D)
Governor

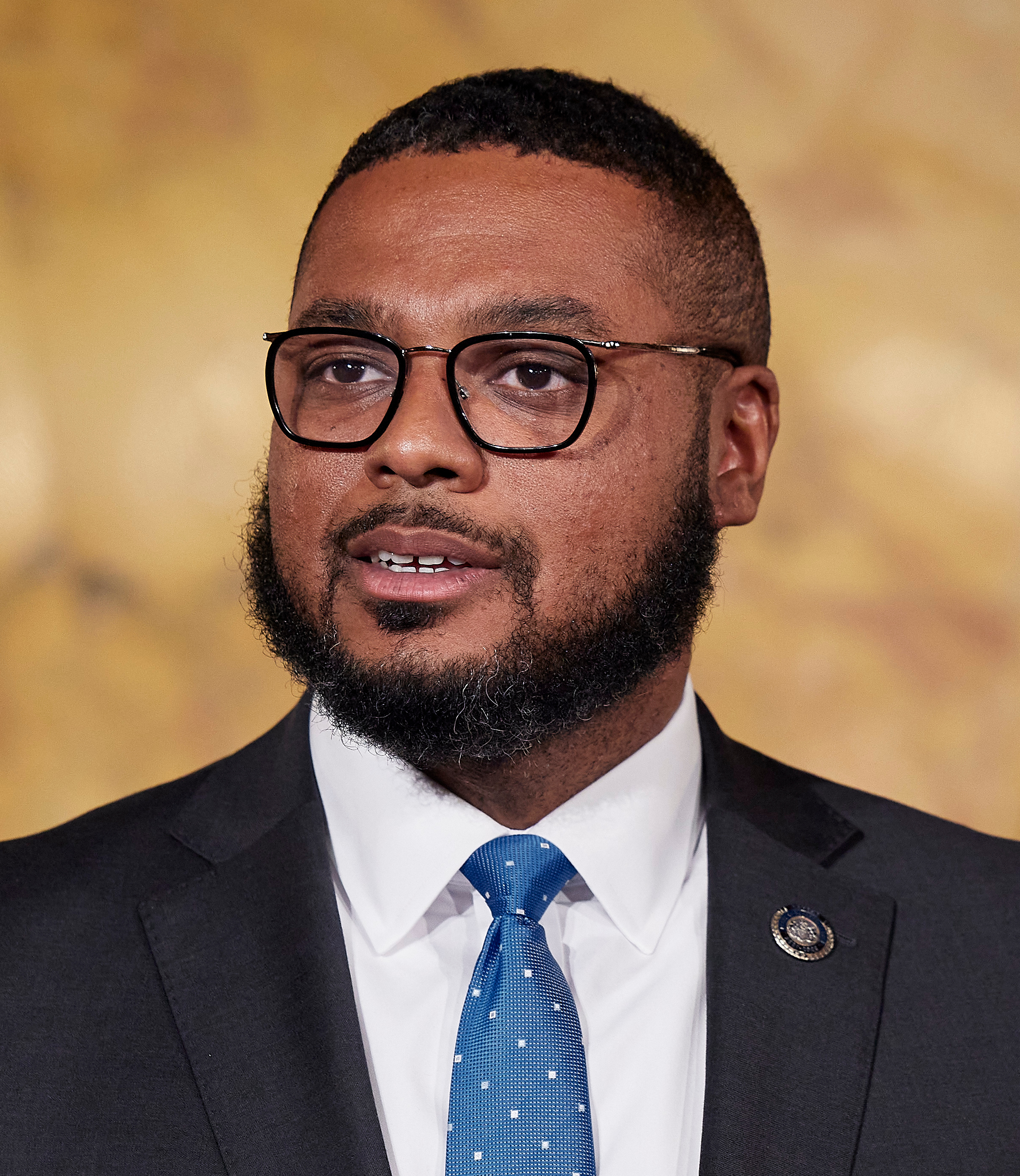
Austin Davis (D)
Lieutenant Governor

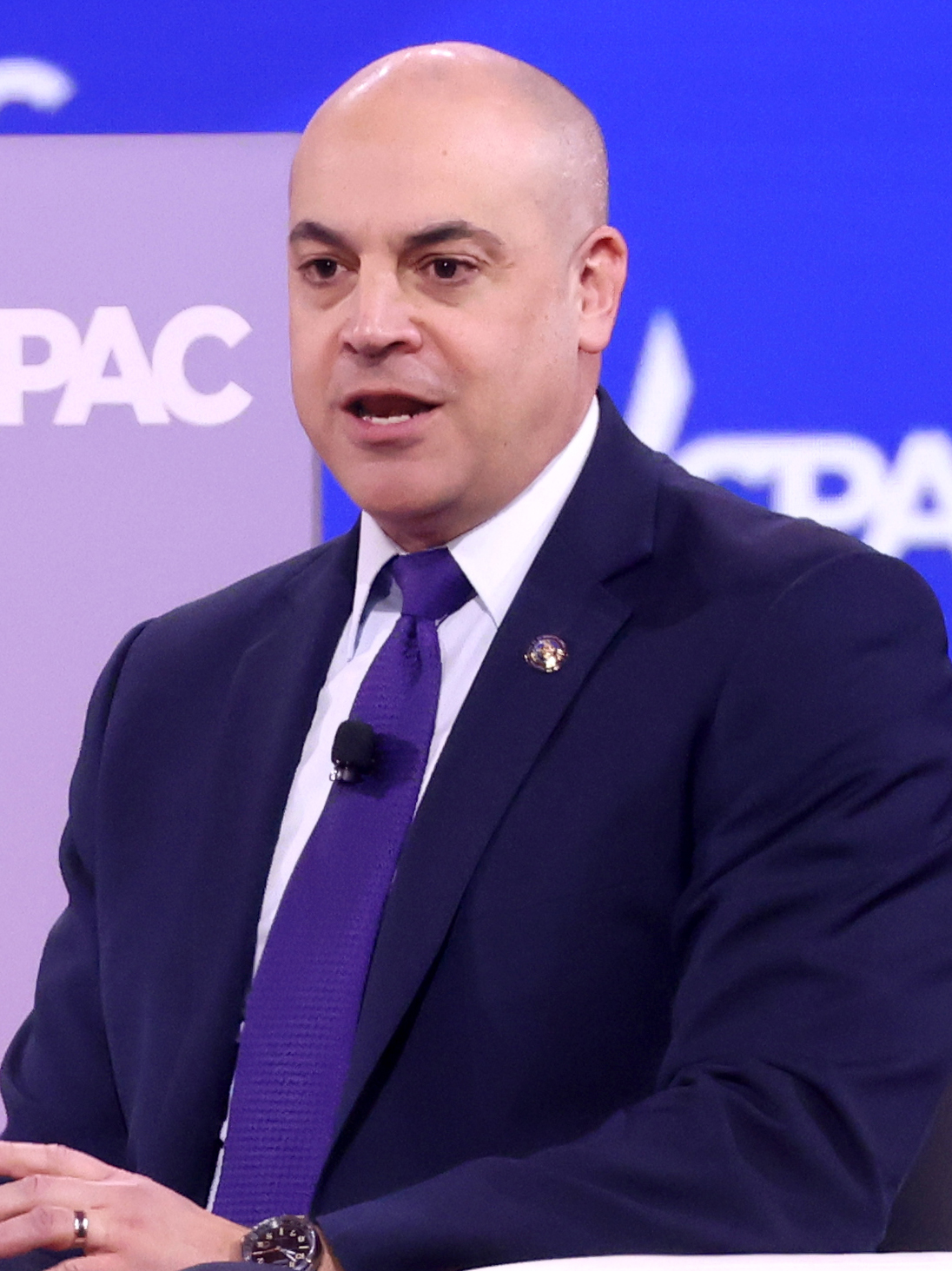
Dave Sunday (R)
Attorney General

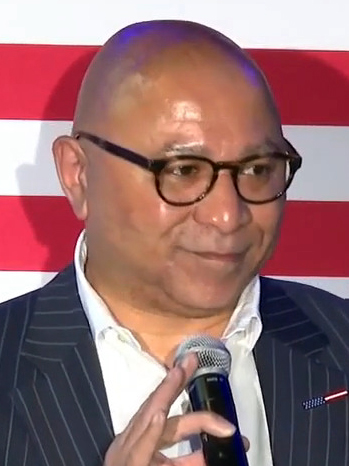
Timothy DeFoor (R)
Auditor General

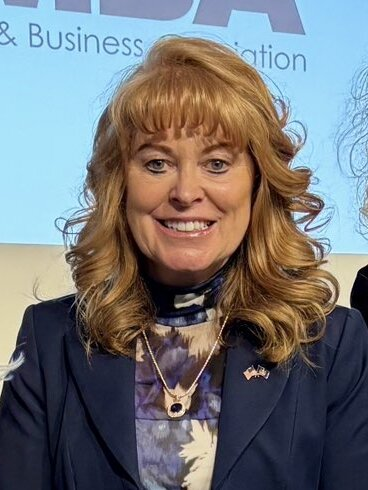
Stacy Garrity (R)
Treasurer

=== Departments ===
The governor's cabinet comprises the directors of various commonwealth agencies:

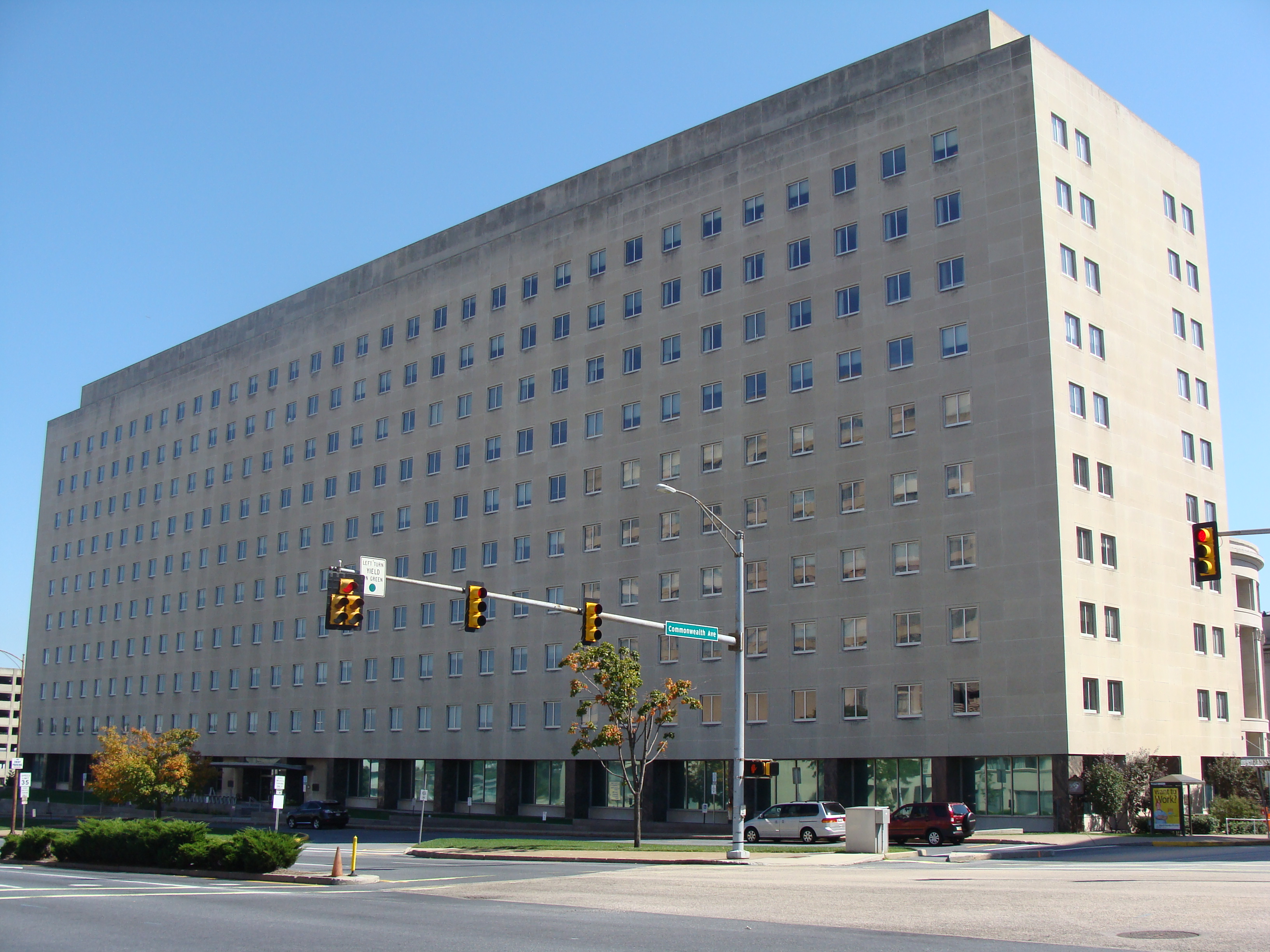
The Health and Welfare Building within the Pennsylvania State Capitol Complex

- Office of Administration (OA)
- Department of Aging
- Department of Agriculture (PDA)
- Department of Banking and Securities (DoBS)
- Office of the Budget
- Department of Community and Economic Development (DCED)
- Department of Conservation and Natural Resources (DCNR)
- Department of Corrections (DOC)
- Department of Drug and Alcohol Programs (DDAP)
- Department of Education (PDE)
- Emergency Management Agency (PEMA)
- Department of Environmental Protection (DEP)
- Office of General Counsel (OGC)
- Department of General Services (DGS)
- Department of Health
- Department of Human Services (DHS)
- Department of Insurance
- Department of Labor and Industry (L&I)
- Department of Military and Veterans Affairs (DMVA)
- Department of Revenue (DOR)
- Department of State (DOS)
- Pennsylvania State Police (PSP)
- Department of Transportation (PennDOT)

The Pennsylvania Bulletin is the weekly gazette containing proposed, enacted and emergency rules and other notices and important documents, which are codified in the Pennsylvania Code.

== Legislative branch ==
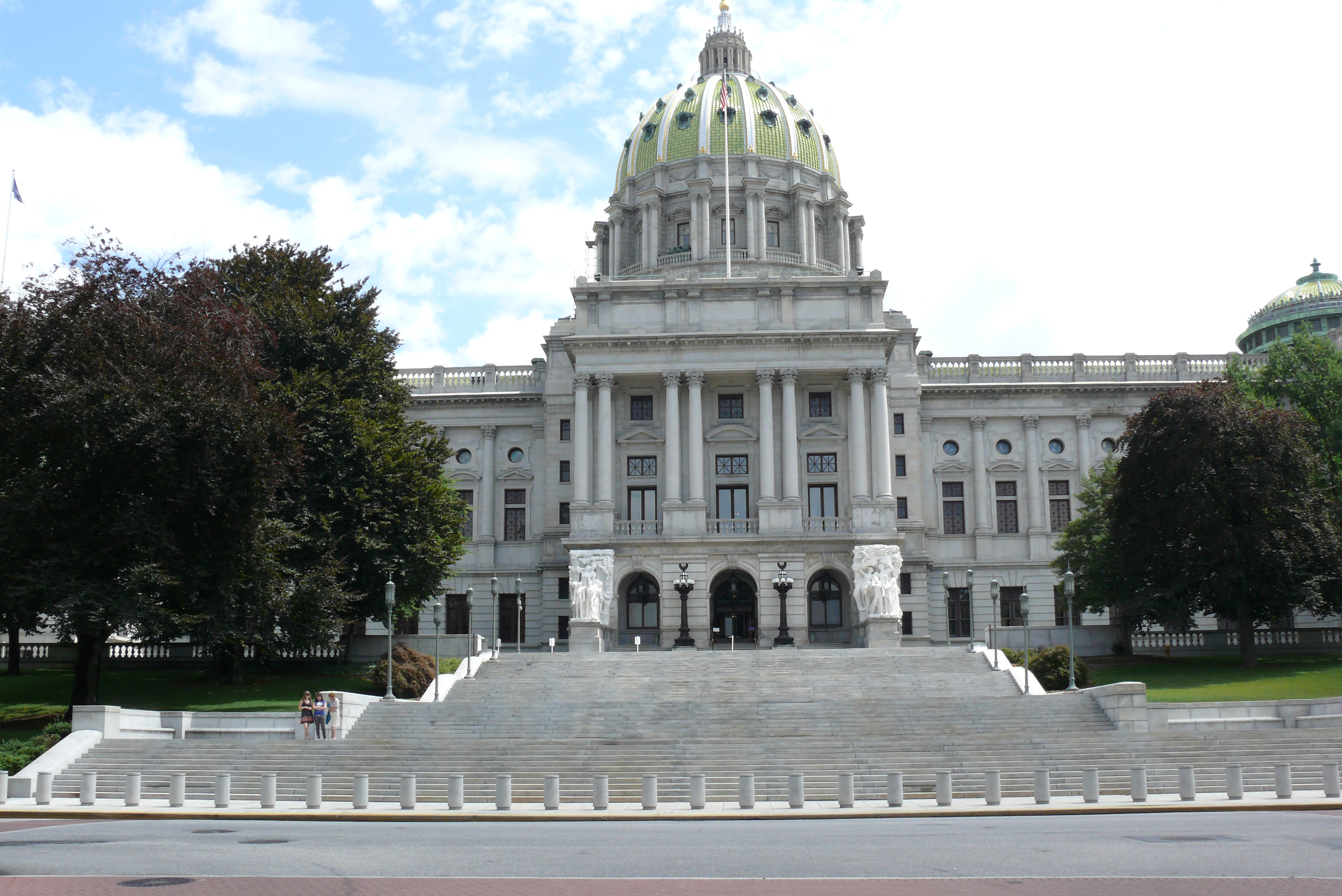
The Pennsylvania State Capitol

The Pennsylvania General Assembly is the bicameral state legislature composed of 253 members: the House of Representatives with 203 representatives, and the Senate with 50 senators. The speaker of the House or their designated speaker pro tempore holds sessions of the House. The president of the Senate is the lieutenant governor, who has no vote except to break a tie. The legislature meets in the Pennsylvania State Capitol in Harrisburg. Its session laws are published in the official Laws of Pennsylvania, which are codified in the Pennsylvania Consolidated Statutes. Members of the Senate and the House cannot hold a position in any civic office, and both the houses may expel a member with two-thirds vote. Any member who is expelled for corruption may never run again for reelection in either portion of the legislature.

== Judicial branch ==
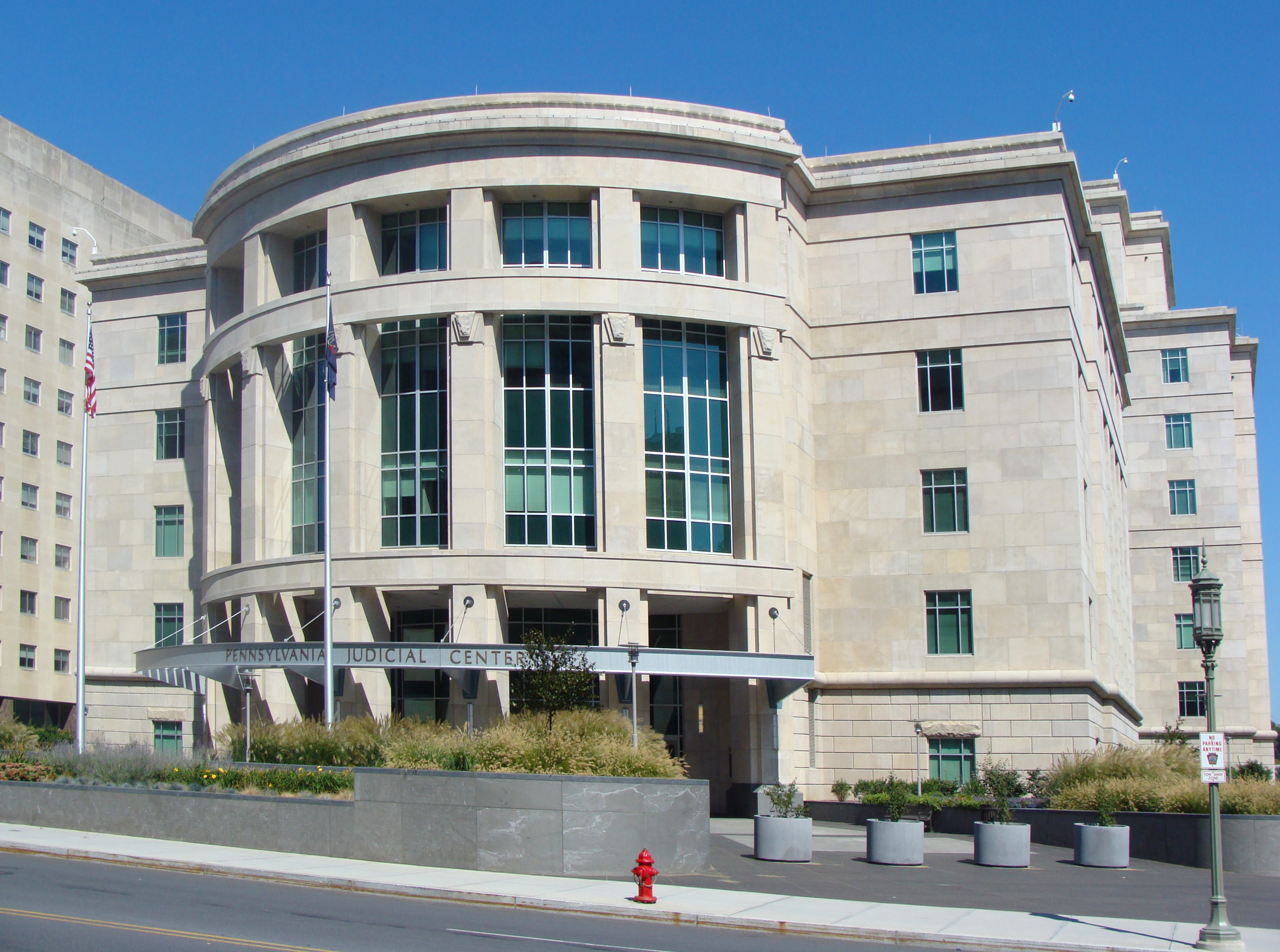
The Pennsylvania Judicial Center within the Pennsylvania State Capitol Complex

Pennsylvania is divided into 60 judicial districts, most of which (except Philadelphia) have magisterial district judges (formerly called district justices and justices of the peace), who preside mainly over minor criminal offenses and small civil claims. Magisterial District Judges also preside over preliminary hearings in all misdemeanor and felony criminal cases. Most criminal and civil cases originate in the courts of common pleas, which also serve as appellate courts to the district judges and for local agency decisions. The Superior Court hears all appeals from the courts of common pleas not expressly designated to the Commonwealth Court or Supreme Court of Pennsylvania. It also has original jurisdiction to review warrants for wiretap surveillance. The Commonwealth Court is limited to appeals from final orders of certain state agencies and certain designated cases from the courts of common pleas. The Supreme Court of Pennsylvania is the final appellate court. All judges in Pennsylvania are elected; the chief justice is determined by seniority.

In total, 439 judges preside over the court of common pleas, 9 judges preside over the Commonwealth Court, 15 judges preside over the Superior Court, and 7 justices preside over the Supreme Court. Elected judges run in 10 year terms, at which point they are required to run in a non-partisan retention election if they wish to continue to serve.

== Local government ==
Local government in Pennsylvania consists of five types of local governments: county, township, borough, city, and school district. All of Pennsylvania is included in one of the state's 67 counties and each county is then divided into one of the state's 2,562 municipalities. There are no independent cities or unincorporated territory within Pennsylvania. Local municipalities are either governed by statutes enacted by the Pennsylvania legislature and administered through the Pennsylvania Code, by a home rule charter or optional form of government adopted by the municipality with consent of the legislature. Municipalities may enact and enforce local ordinances.

Pennsylvania enacted the Local Government Commission in 1935, by an Act of Assembly. The commission is one of the oldest in the country, composed of five members of the State Senate and House of Representatives who are appointed by the president pro tempore of the Senate and the speaker of the House. The commission provides assistance to Members of the General Assembly on researching local issues.

== Law enforcement ==
Unlike other states, Pennsylvania does not use county sheriff's offices to patrol areas without local police. Some municipalities elect to create or co-create local police departments, particularly to get better response times, have specific patrols of areas, and/or to enforce local ordinances. Others choose to only have part-time departments, with Pennsylvania State Police (PSP) filling the remainder of duties, or to use the PSP as the sole law enforcement agency. Any municipality may choose not to have a police department, and there is no extra cost for fully relying on the PSP. As of 2016, 1,287 municipalities in the state used the PSP as their only local law enforcement, making up about 50% of the state's municipalities. The full PSP municipalities that have a population of 10,000 or below combined have about 17% of the total number of people in Pennsylvania; these municipalities make up about 50% of the total municipalities in the state. About 80% of Pennsylvania residents live in areas with part-time or full-time police coverage, and those areas combined are 49% of the municipalities in the state. In 2019, about 66% of the municipalities in the state had PSP as the sole law enforcement or had a part-time police force combined with PSP. Any municipality using PSP may collect about 50% of the funds from any relevant traffic stops which result in ticketed drivers.

== See also ==
- Politics of Pennsylvania
- Elections in Pennsylvania
- Law of Pennsylvania
