= Governor of Pennsylvania =

Head of government of the U.S. state of Pennsylvania

Governor of the Commonwealth of Pennsylvania
- Seal of the governor

- Flag of the governor

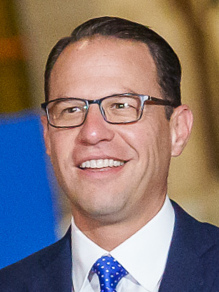
- Incumbent; Josh Shapiro since January 17, 2023
- Government of Pennsylvania
- Style: Governor (informal); The Honorable (formal)
- Status: Head of state; Head of government
- Residence: Governor's Residence
- Term length: Four years, renewable once consecutively
- Inaugural holder: Thomas Mifflin
- Formation: December 21, 1790
- Succession: Line of succession
- Deputy: Lieutenant Governor of Pennsylvania
- Salary: $253,870 (2025)
- Website: Official website

The governor of the Commonwealth of Pennsylvania is the head of government of the Commonwealth of Pennsylvania.

== Qualifications and term ==
Candidates for the office of governor of Pennsylvania must be at least thirty years of age and have resided in the state for at least seven years preceding the general election. Candidates are also prohibited from holding federal office or another state office of Pennsylvania. Exceptions are made for members of the National Guard and the reserve components of the United States Armed Forces, as well as attorneys at law.

== Compensation and residence ==
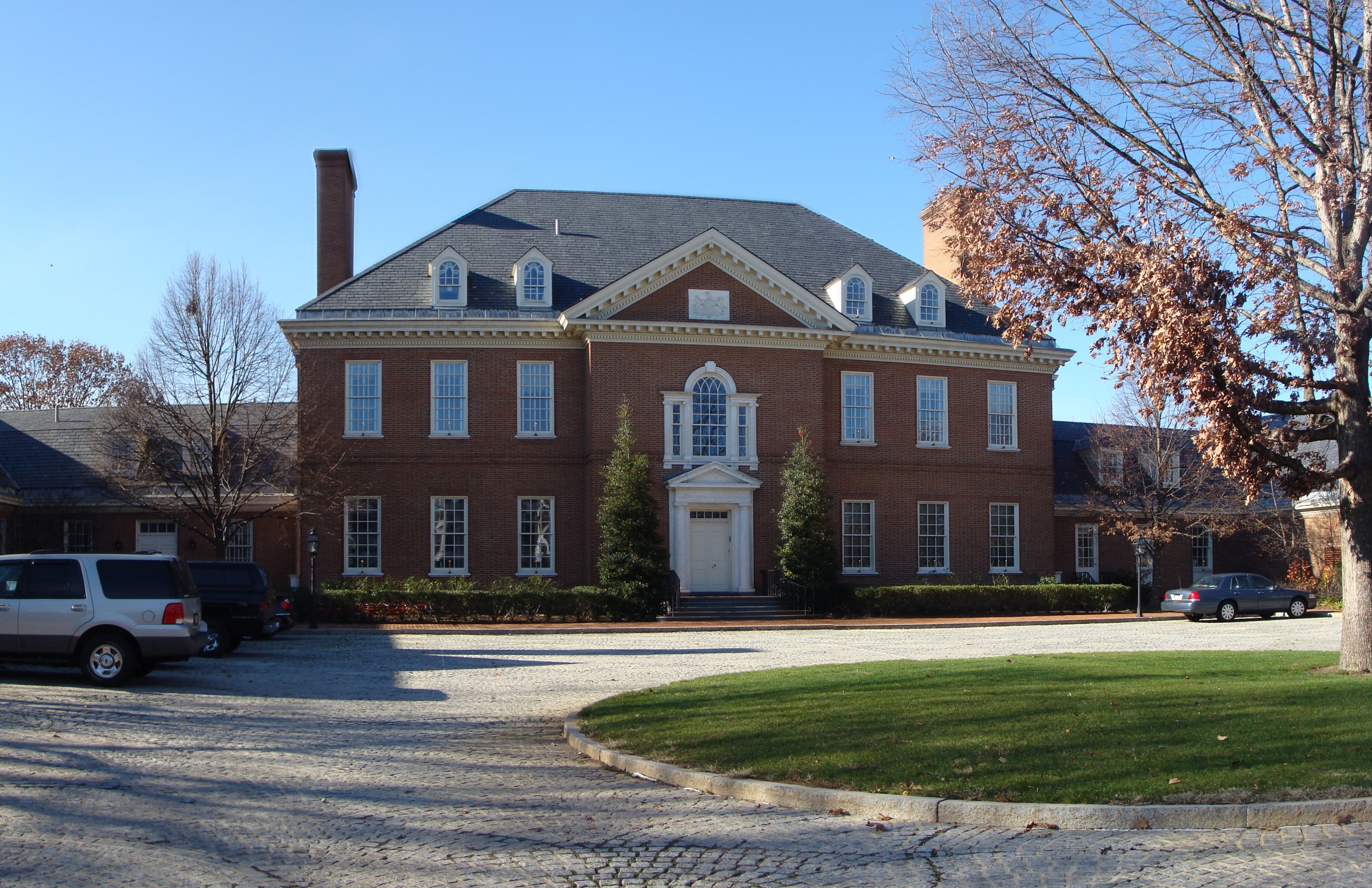
The Governor's Residence is the official residence of the governor of Pennsylvania.

The governor's salary is set by law, and is equal to $125,000 multiplied by the percentage change of the consumer price index between January 1, 1997 and the beginning of the current calendar year. The annual increase was canceled for 2021 due to the COVID-19 pandemic. In 2025, the governor's salary was $253,870.

The Pennsylvania Governor's Residence is the official residence of the governor of Pennsylvania, and is located at 2035 Front Street in the state capital of Harrisburg. It is operated and maintained by the Pennsylvania Department of General Services. Since it was completed in 1968, most governor have lived at the residence full-time during their term in office. Governor Tom Corbett, during his term, resided part-time at the residence and traveled from his residence in Shaler Township, near Pittsburgh. Governor Tom Wolf commuted full-time from his private residence in Mount Wolf in nearby York County, and only used the residence for official functions. During the governorship of Josh Shapiro, the Governor's Residence was the subject of an arson attack targeting the governor.

== Sources ==
- George, Alex, ed. (2025). The Pennsylvania Manual. Vol. 127. Harrisburg: Pennsylvania Department of General Services. ISBN 978-0-8182-0399-2.
- Reber, Zachary (December 20, 2025). "Statutory Cost of Living Increases for Salaries of State Officials and the Heads of Departments, Boards and Commissions". Pennsylvania Bulletin. 55 (51). Harrisburg: Commonwealth of Pennsylvania: 8714–8716.
