= Pennsylvania Statutes at Large =

- Publisher: Legislative Reference Bureau, Pennsylvania General Assembly

Pennsylvania Session Laws is an 18 volume collection of laws Province and Commonwealth of Pennsylvania from 1682 to 1809. The first volume was published electronically in 2001; volumes 2 to 18 printed in the years spanning 1896 to 1915.

Volume I
Volume II (1700-1712)
Volume III (1712-1724)
Volume IV (1724-1744)
Volume V (1744-1759)
Volume VI (1759-1765)
Volume VII (1765-1770)
Volume VIII (1770-1776)
Volume IX (1776-1779)
Volume X (1779-1781)
Volume XI (1782)
Volume XII (1785-1787)
Volume XIII (1787-1790)
Volume XIV (1791-1793)
Volume XV (1794-1797)
Volume XVI (1798-1801)
Volume XVII (1802-1805)
Volume XVIII (1806-1809)

== See also ==
- Pennsylvania Consolidated Statutes
- Purdon's Pennsylvania Statutes
- Law of Pennsylvania
