= Gun laws in Pennsylvania =

Location of Pennsylvania in the United States

Gun laws in Pennsylvania regulate the sale, possession, and use of firearms and ammunition in the Commonwealth of Pennsylvania in the United States.

== Summary table ==
Subject / law	Long guns	Handguns	Relevant statutes	Notes
State permit required to purchase?	No	No		
Firearm registration?	No	No	18 Pa.C.S. § 6111.4	All handgun buyers in the state must undergo a PICS check at the point of sale, a record of which is maintained by the state police in a "sales database". However, firearm owners moving to Pennsylvania from another state are not required to register their firearms. As stated in 18 Pa.C.S. § 6111.4: "Notwithstanding any section of this chapter to the contrary, nothing in this chapter shall be construed to allow any government or law enforcement agency or any agent thereof to create, maintain or operate any registry of firearm ownership within this Commonwealth."
Assault weapon law?	No	No		
Magazine capacity restriction?	No	No		
Owner license required?	No	No		
Permit required for concealed carry?	N/A	Yes	18 Pa.C.S. § 6109	
Permit required for open carry?	No	No	18 Pa.C.S. § 6107; 18 Pa.C.S. § 6108	May carry openly without permit, except LTCF required in Philadelphia (City of the First Class), in a vehicle, or during a declared state of emergency. On May 31, 2019, the Supreme Court of Pennsylvania ruled that carrying a firearm is not reasonable suspicion to detain someone.
Castle Doctrine/Stand Your Ground law?	Yes	Yes	18 Pa.C.S. § 505	"An actor who is not engaged in a criminal activity, who is not in illegal possession of a firearm...has no duty to retreat and has the right to stand his ground and use force, including deadly force, if: (i) the actor has a right to be in the place where he was attacked; (ii) the actor believes it is immediately necessary to do so to protect himself against death, serious bodily injury, kidnapping or sexual intercourse by force or threat; and (iii) the person against whom the force is used displays or otherwise uses: (A) a firearm or replica of a firearm as defined in 42 Pa.C.S. § 9712 (relating to sentences for offenses committed with firearms); or (B) any other weapon readily or apparently capable of lethal use"
State preemption of local restrictions?	Yes	Yes	18 Pa.C.S. § 6120	"No county, municipality or township may in any manner regulate the lawful ownership, possession, transfer or transportation of firearms, ammunition or ammunition components when carried or transported for purposes not prohibited by the laws of this Commonwealth."
NFA weapons restricted?	No	No		
Peaceable Journey laws?	Yes	Yes	18 Pa.C.S. § 6106(b)(11)(14)	Non-residents may carry in a vehicle if in possession of a valid carry permit from any state. Otherwise, federal rules observed.
Background checks required for private sales?	No	Yes	18 Pa.C.S. § 6111(c)	All private party transfers of handguns must be processed through a licensed dealer, or at a county sheriff's office. In either case a background check is required.

== State gun legislation ==
=== Act 192 of 2014 ===
Act 192 of 2014 allowed gun owners and firearm advocacy groups to file suit against local municipalities for their gun control ordinances. Philadelphia, Lancaster, Pittsburgh and five Democratic legislators filed suit on the grounds that the act was unconstitutional. The Pennsylvania Supreme Court ruled in favor of the cities and five legislators that the act was unconstitutional on the grounds that bills must pertain to one subject. Act 192 of 2014 was originally intended to criminalize the theft of metals. The firearm part of the act was a provision. City Solicitor Sozi Tulante released a statement against the bill: "Act 192 was passed by the General Assembly without any public notice or debate, and would have flooded the courts with advocacy litigation even when the plaintiffs had no real legal stake in the case." Senator Daylin Leach, one of the five Democrats to file suit stated: "municipalities that repealed ordinances may now restore them." During the case they found the law unconstitutional Justice David Wecht said "If, by brute force, the majority of the General Assembly can cram through any number of regulations."

=== House Bill 921 of 2014 ===
Authored by Rep. Timothy Krieger, the intent of the bill was to eliminate the Pennsylvania Instant Check System in favor of the National Instant Check System and allowing the Federal government to administer the background check instead of state police.

== Local legislation and preemption ==
=== Ortiz v. Commonwealth ===
In 1993, two Home Rule Municipalities, Philadelphia and Pittsburgh, attempted to regulate assault weapons. On June 17, 1993, the mayor of Philadelphia Ed Rendell signed and approved Bill No. 508 submitted by the Philadelphia City Council, which banned certain types of assault weapons in Philadelphia County. In 1994, the Pittsburgh City Council passed Ordinance 30-1994, which also banned certain specified assault weapons within Pittsburgh's physical boundaries. These ordinances planned to regulate the ownership, use, possession or transfer of certain firearms. After these ordinances were enacted the General Assembly passed House Bill 185 on October 4, 1994, which amended Title 18 of the Crimes Code, including the Pennsylvania Uniform Firearms Act, 18 Pa.C.S. §§ 6101–6124. The amendment, which appears at 18 Pa.C.S. § 6120, provided that no county, municipality or township could regulate the ownership or transfer of firearms or ammunition.

Councilman Angel Ortiz of Philadelphia City Council and other Philadelphia appellants brought an action against the state in the Commonwealth Court of Pennsylvania, arguing that the state had exceeded its jurisdiction over the Home Rule Municipalities in this case. The Philadelphia appellants argued that only in Philadelphia must a person obtain a license for carrying any firearm, on a public street or public property, regardless of whether it is unconcealed or concealed. Throughout the rest of Pennsylvania, a license is only necessary if one is carrying a concealed firearm or is carrying one in a vehicle. 18 Pa.C.S.A. 6106(a).

In 1996, the Pennsylvania Supreme Court ruled that the state preemption statute was valid and that Philadelphia and Pittsburgh could not enact stricter gun control laws.

=== Further attempts ===
In 2008, Philadelphia had seven different 2007 ordinances invalidated in Clarke v. House of Representatives; they included a limit of 1 handgun purchase per month and prohibiting straw purchases, reporting lost or stolen firearms, license requirement to acquire firearm or to bring one into the city, annual gun license renewal, firearm confiscation from someone posing a risk of harm, banning possession or transfer of assault rifles, and reporting requirements for ammunition sales. In April 2008, the city sought to reenact the ordinances with minor changes. The Philadelphia City Council proposed in 2016 to mandate all firearm owners with minors living in their custody lock their firearms at all times. The firearms must also be in a locked area with ammunition also being in a locked area; separate from the firearm. Lawsuits (National Rifle Association v. City of Philadelphia) are pending.

In 2014, the City of Erie had its local ordinance prohibiting firearms in city parks invalidated in Dillon v. City of Erie.

In 2014, the City of Harrisburg enacted ordinances prohibiting firearm possession by minors, discharging firearms within the city, mandatory reporting of lost or stolen firearms within 48 hours, and firearm sale, display and long gun possession in public restrictions during a state of emergency; legal challenges are pending.

In 2014, the state legislature passed Act 192 which allowed gun owners and firearm advocacy groups to file suit against local municipalities for their gun control ordinances. In 2015, the Pennsylvania Supreme Court ruled in favor of Philadelphia, Lancaster, Pittsburgh and five democratic legislators that the act was unconstitutional on the grounds that bills must pertain to one subject. Act 192 was originally intended to criminalize the theft of metals and a provision was amended to add the part regarding legal standing to challenge local firearm ordinances.

In 2016, Lower Merion Township had its 2011 ordinance prohibiting carry or discharge of firearms in a park without a special permit invalidated in Firearm Owners Against Crime v. Lower Merion Township.

In 2017, Pittsburgh attempted to ban firearms in city parks. On April 9, 2019, Pittsburgh enacted three gun control laws, prohibiting use of assault weapons, magazines with capacities greater than 10, and enacting a red flag law. These laws are being challenged as a violation of preemption. Pittsburgh has agreed not to enforce the laws while the lawsuits proceed. On October 29, 2019, the Allegheny Court of Common Pleas invalidated all three ordinances as a violation of state preemption. On November 18, 2019, Pittsburgh filed an appeal.

In 2020, Philadelphia had an ordinance that requires the reporting of lost or stolen firearms enjoined.

=== Sanctuaries ===
Some counties have adopted Second Amendment sanctuary resolutions.

== Purchasing a firearm ==
Pennsylvania state law refers to a handgun as a "firearm", while "long gun" is used to describe a shotgun, or rifle of a certain length or longer. Minimum age for purchasing a long gun is 18, and the age restriction for purchasing a handgun is 21. However, someone under 21 can own a handgun if they are 18 and received the handgun as a gift. The limitation on young adult gun ownership has been struck down as unconstitutional by the Third Circuit Court of Appeals on January 18, 2024 and was officially enjoined from being enforced on April 24, 2024 in the case of ′Lara v. Evanchick′.

To purchase a firearm, buyers must be at least 18 years of age. They can never have been convicted of a violent crime, must not be an undocumented immigrant, declared mentally ill by the court, a drug addict or habitual drunkard, a fugitive from justice, have been convicted of three separate DUI charges within a five-year period (or just one charge if it is classified as a first degree misdemeanor which carries a sentence of up to 5 years) or are subject to an active protection from abuse order. State level charges which are punishable by a sentence of more than one year (even if no jail time is actually served) disqualifies one from purchasing firearms under federal law. However, several court rulings have declared such prohibitions unconstitutional; e.g. first degree misdemeanor DUI charge and furnishing counterfeit documents.

In 2019, the Pennsylvania Supreme Court held that for the Pennsylvania State Police (“PSP”) to deny an individual pursuant to an alleged federal firearms disability, the PSP must prove, in addition to the person being prohibited under 18 U.S.C. § 922(g), that the firearm moved in interstate commerce.

No firearms are known to be prohibited by state law. Private sales of handguns must go through a licensed dealer, though long guns may be sold privately without the use of a licensed dealer. Licensed dealers must provide locking devices with handguns unless the handgun has a locking device incorporated in its design.

In Pennsylvania, there are more than 2,500 federally licensed firearm dealers where one may make a purchase. Individuals interested in purchasing a firearm must first fill out an application with their basic information. Once the application has been completed, the firearms dealer will input the information into the Pennsylvania Instant Check System to check if the individual is legally allowed to own a firearm. On average in Pennsylvania, this background check costs $20.00 for handgun purchases and $25.00 for a long gun purchase.

Residents in Pennsylvania may also purchase firearms from gun shows and private individuals. When purchasing from a federally licensed dealer at a gun show, the process remains the same. When purchasing a long gun in a private sale, the buyer is exempt from obtaining a background check. When purchasing a handgun in a private sale, the buyer is legally required to complete a firearm transfer at a federally licensed dealer. There is a $2 fee for the instant check and a $3 firearm sale surcharge to cover telephone costs.

Transfers of handguns between spouses, parent and child, grandparent and grandchild or between active law enforcement officers are exempt from the above requirements. Rifles and shotguns may be transferred between unlicensed individuals. Antique firearms are exempt from the requirements regarding transfer of firearms through dealers.

=== Definition of a firearm ===
The Pennsylvania Uniform Firearms Act defines "firearm" as "any pistol or revolver with a barrel less than 15 inches, any shotgun with a barrel less than 18 inches, any rifle with a barrel of less than 16 inches or any pistol, revolver, rifle or shotgun with an overall length of less than 26 inches." However, several sections of the law include a broader definition that includes all firearms, i.e. handguns, rifles and shotguns, and pertains to that section only. The distinction should be closely noted when interpreting the statutes. Attorney General Josh Shapiro issued a legal opinion in December 2019 that 80% lower receivers are considered firearms. A legal challenge ensued and the Commonwealth Court issued a preliminary injunction.

=== Gun dealer requirements ===
Dealers are prohibited from transferring the firearm if the Pennsylvania State Police has issued a "temporary delay" in order to investigate whether the person has been convicted of a domestic violence misdemeanor that disqualifies the person from firearm possession.

To sell a handgun or short-barreled rifle or shotgun, a dealer must also:

- Require the purchaser to complete a purchase application, which includes a statement that the purchaser is the actual buyer of the firearm. The dealer must retain a copy of the application for at least 20 years, mail the original to Pennsylvania State Police within 14 days of the sale, and provide one copy to the purchaser;
- Record the approval number on the application; and
- If the purchaser passes the background check, deliver the firearm to the purchaser securely wrapped and unloaded.

== Concealed carry and transport ==
Individuals in Pennsylvania are permitted to open carry firearms without a permit as long as the firearm is in plain view. When concealing a firearm, individuals must obtain a License To Carry Firearms from the local sheriff's' office. An individual must have a Pennsylvania License To Carry Firearms or a firearm license from any other state, to carry a handgun in a vehicle in Pennsylvania. Long guns are not allowed to be transported loaded.

In Philadelphia, a license is required for both concealed carry, and open carry. A total of 31 states recognized Pennsylvania's license to concealed carry.

When transporting firearms in Pennsylvania without a License To Carry Firearms or a firearm license from any other state, the firearm and ammunition must be in two separate containers within the vehicle.

To apply for a license to carry in Pennsylvania, individuals must be at least 21 years of age. The application process requires submitting the Pennsylvania License to Carry Firearms application to the sheriff of the county in which they reside. Individuals who are not residents of Pennsylvania but are 21 years of age or older may submit the Application for a Pennsylvania License to Carry Firearms to any Pennsylvania County Sheriff's office along with the required fee. This limitation is no longer in effect because of the case ′Lara v. Evanchick′.

Firearms are prohibited from certain places, including federal court facilities; all other court facilities must provide a locker to secure firearms while conducting business within the court facility as per 18 Pa.C.S 913 (e). Concealed carry on school property used to be an unsettled area of the law with many in law enforcement arguing that the practice is absolutely prohibited and firearms right supporters arguing that 18 Pa.C.S. 912(c) permits those who have a concealed carry license to carry on school grounds as an "other lawful purpose." On February 16, 2017, the Superior Court ruled in the case of Commonwealth v. Goslin that the "other lawful purpose" clause is a valid defense for people who are otherwise carrying a weapon legally on school grounds regardless of any connection to a school activity. Carrying a handgun on public streets and public property of Philadelphia, or in a vehicle anywhere in the state, or concealed on or about one's person anywhere in the state is prohibited without a "License To Carry Firearms" (LTCF) or a license or permit issued by another state which is honored by Pennsylvania for that purpose. A LTCF is generally not required to openly carry a firearm on or about one's person, except in a vehicle or in Philadelphia, or during a declared State of Emergency. A bill proposed in September 2014 would allow teachers and school employees to carry guns.

Pennsylvania shall issue a LTCF to resident and non-resident applicants if no good cause exists to deny the license. Non-resident applicants must first obtain a license from their home state, unless their home state does not issue licenses.

== Laws and regulations ==
Article 1, section 21 of the Constitution of Pennsylvania states, "The right of the citizens to bear arms in defense of themselves and the State shall not be questioned."

Pennsylvania has state preemption for regulation of the lawful ownership, possession, transfer or transportation of firearms, ammunition, or ammunition components. That is, only state laws, not local laws, can regulate those matters.

Most items that are required to be registered under the National Firearms Act such as machine guns, suppressors, short barreled rifles and shotguns, are prohibited in Pennsylvania as "offensive weapons" unless they are registered under the NFA.

There are no regulating laws for the sale, purchase, or possession of ammunition. Use of armor-piercing ammunition for criminal activities is specifically prohibited by statute.

Pennsylvania law requires that information received by the Pennsylvania State Police pursuant to a sale is destroyed within 72 hours of the completion of the background check. The Pennsylvania Firearm Owners Association notes that the Pennsylvania State Police nonetheless keep a "sales database" of all handguns purchased within the state. The database was challenged based on what was asserted as the unambiguous text of the statute, specifically "nothing... ...shall be construed to allow any government or law enforcement agency or any agent thereof to create, maintain or operate any registry of firearm ownership within this Commonwealth" (full statute text above), the Pennsylvania Supreme Court nonetheless ruled in Allegheny County Sportsmen's League v. Rendell, 860 A.2d 10 (Pa. 2004), that Pennsylvania's database of handgun sales is not prohibited by state law because the registration was only of handgun sales and not of all guns.

== See also ==
- Law of Pennsylvania
- Uniform Firearms Act
