= Search and seizure law in Pennsylvania =

The law of search and seizure in Pennsylvania is controlled by both the United States Constitution and the broader protections of the Pennsylvania Constitution. This article is concerned only with the protections provided by the Pennsylvania Constitution.

== Overview ==
Police officers and other law enforcement officials are limited in the means of investigation that they may utilize. That is, the law limits the ways in which police officers can investigate and arrest a person suspected of a crime. In the event a law enforcement official violates these rules, evidence obtained may be suppressed, which essentially means that the prosecution may not use the evidence in court to convict a defendant of the crime charged. Successful suppression of evidence often means the prosecution will not be able to make out the charges, and the defendant gets to go home. This article provides an overview summary of some of the major topics in Pennsylvania search and seizure jurisprudence.

== Relationship between the U.S. Constitution and the Pennsylvania Constitution ==
The US Supreme Court's interpretation of the Fourth Amendment do not control the Pennsylvania Supreme Court's interpretation of the protections under Article I § 8 of the Pennsylvania Constitution. See, e.g., Commonwealth v. Edmunds, 586 A.2d 887 (1991). In fact, Federal Fourth Amendment decisions establish the constitutional floor, but Pennsylvania is free to offer heightened protections to her citizens.

== The "Reasonable Expectation" of Privacy ==
In order for a person to receive protection under Article I § 8 (and the Fourth Amendment), (1) that person must have exhibited a subjective, expectation of privacy and (2) that expectation must be one that society is prepared to recognize as reasonable. See Katz v. United States, 389 U.S. 347 (1967); Commonwealth v. Lowery, 451 A.2d 245 (Pa. Super. Ct. 1982). It is the Defendant's burden to establish his or her privacy interest; after the privacy interest is established, the Commonwealth then needs to show that the subject evidence was not illegally obtained. Commonwealth v. Millner, 888 A.2d 680 (Pa. 2005); Commonwealth v. Perea, 791 A.2d 427 (Pa. Super. Ct. 2002).

== Vehicles ==
On 30 April 2014, the Pennsylvania Supreme Court decided with a 4-2 margin that exigency was no longer necessary, so long as the search based on the automobile exception to the warrant requirement is based on probable cause and the vehicle is readily mobile.

However, on December 22, 2020, the Pennsylvania Supreme Court overruled its prior decision in Gary. The Court established that Pa. Const. art. I, § 8 afforded greater protection to Commonwealth citizens than the Fourth Amendment, U.S. Const. amend. IV, and reaffirmed that the Pennsylvania Constitution requires both a showing of probable cause and exigent circumstances to justify a warrantless search of an automobile.

== See also ==
- Law of Pennsylvania
