= Pennsylvania Manual =

The Pennsylvania Manual
- Discipline: Pennsylvania government
- Language: English
- Edited by: Alex George

Publication details
- Former names: Smull's Legislative Hand Book and Manual of the State of Pennsylvania
- Publisher: Pennsylvania Department of General Services (US)
- Frequency: Biennial

Standard abbreviations
- ISO 4: Pa. Man.

Indexing
- ISSN: 0275-8814
- OCLC no.: 5656365

Links
- Journal homepage

The Pennsylvania Manual is a biennial guide to the Government of Pennsylvania produced by the Pennsylvania Department of General Services. The Pennsylvania Manual has been published by the Pennsylvania Government for over 200 years. In 2016, the 122nd volume was printed.

== Editions ==
- The Pennsylvania Manual. Vol. 114. Harrisburg: Pennsylvania Department of General Services. 1999. ISBN 0-8182-0248-3. Archived from the original on November 16, 2001.
- The Pennsylvania Manual. Vol. 115. Harrisburg: Pennsylvania Department of General Services. 2001. ISBN 0-8182-0271-8. Archived from the original on August 10, 2002.
- Schehr, Elizabeth, ed. (2003). The Pennsylvania Manual (PDF). Vol. 116. Harrisburg: Pennsylvania Department of General Services. ISBN 0-8182-0285-8. Archived from the original (PDF) on October 1, 2011.
- Schehr, Elizabeth, ed. (2005). The Pennsylvania Manual (PDF). Vol. 117. Harrisburg: Pennsylvania Department of General Services. Archived from the original (PDF) on June 28, 2009.
- Trostle, Sharon, ed. (2007). The Pennsylvania Manual (PDF). Vol. 118. Harrisburg: Pennsylvania Department of General Services. ISBN 978-0-8182-0318-3. Archived from the original (PDF) on August 5, 2014.
- Trostle, Sharon, ed. (2009). The Pennsylvania Manual (PDF). Vol. 119. Harrisburg: Pennsylvania Department of General Services. ISBN 978-0-8182-0334-3. Archived from the original on 2016-04-08.
- Trostle, Sharon, ed. (2011). The Pennsylvania Manual (PDF). Vol. 120. Harrisburg: Pennsylvania Department of General Services. ISBN 978-0-8182-0345-9. Archived from the original (PDF) on 2012-06-01.
- Bodgen, Sharon, ed. (2013). The Pennsylvania Manual (PDF). Vol. 121. Harrisburg: Pennsylvania Department of General Services. ISBN 978-0-8182-0357-2. Archived from the original (PDF) on 2016-03-04.
- Bogden, Sharon, ed. (2016). The Pennsylvania Manual (PDF). Vol. 122. Harrisburg: Pennsylvania Department of General Services. ISBN 978-0-8182-0375-6. Archived from the original (PDF) on 2017-01-08.
- Bogden, Sharon, ed. (2017). The Pennsylvania Manual (PDF). Vol. 123. Harrisburg: Pennsylvania Department of General Services. ISBN 978-0-8182-0385-5.
- Bogden, Sharon, ed. (2020). The Pennsylvania Manual (PDF). Vol. 124. Harrisburg: Pennsylvania Department of General Services. ISBN 978-0-8182-0391-6.
- Matos, Sarah, ed. (2021). The Pennsylvania Manual (PDF). Vol. 125. Harrisburg: Pennsylvania Department of General Services. ISBN 978-0-8182-0393-0.
- Barraclough, Jennifer, ed. (2023). The Pennsylvania Manual (PDF). Vol. 126. Harrisburg: Pennsylvania Department of General Services. ISBN 978-0-8182-0397-8.
- George, Alex, ed. (2025). The Pennsylvania Manual (PDF). Vol. 127. Harrisburg: Pennsylvania Department of General Services. ISBN 978-0-8182-0399-2.
