= Pennsylvania Code =

US Legislative Reference publication

- Author: Legislative Reference Bureau; Commonwealth of Pennsylvania
- Genre: legal
- Publisher: Fry Communications; Mechanicsburg, Pennsylvania

The Pennsylvania Code is a publication of the Commonwealth of Pennsylvania, listing all rules, regulations, and other administrative documents from the Government of Pennsylvania.

== Citation ==
Title 1 section 1.2 of the Pennsylvania Code suggests citation in the following format

- The number of the title
- The abbreviation "Pa. Code"
- The section of the Code

(e.g., 1 Pa. Code § 1.2)

== See also ==
- Pennsylvania Bulletin, a weekly publication of changes to agency rules and regulations
- Law of Pennsylvania
