= Alcohol laws of Pennsylvania =

Laws about the consumption of alcoholic beverages in the U.S. state of Pennsylvania

Location of Pennsylvania

The alcohol laws of Pennsylvania contain many peculiarities not found in other states, and are considered some of the strictest regulations in the United States.

== History ==
Pennsylvania's complex alcohol laws can be traced back to the Prohibition era. Gifford Pinchot, who served as governor from 1923 to 1935, had a "dry" stance on alcohol. Even as Prohibition was repealed in Pinchot's second term, he maintained his tough stance on alcohol control. While Pinchot eventually came around to the idea of repeal, he believed strongly that the best way to prevent corruption in the alcohol industry was through state control. The Pennsylvania Liquor Control Board was created to license establishments, set serving hours, and regulate prices. Also in 1933, alcohol sales became a local option whether or not to become wet or dry. Although the state does not have any dry counties, the state still has 683 municipalities (as of January 2019) that are at least partially dry. Many of the dry or moist municipalities are small communities in rural areas.

Retail establishments selling alcohol must be licensed. The Liquor Control Board operates on a quota system, which has changed several times over the years. Currently, the quota is one license per 3,000 county inhabitants, but existing licenses in areas that exceed the quota are grandfathered in.

== License types ==
There are a number of types and sub-categories of liquor licenses available in the state. A retail license allows for the on-premises sale and consumption of alcoholic beverages. However, retail licenses are further divided into retail liquor licenses, which can sell liquor, wine, malt and brewed beverages, and retail dispenser licenses, which can sell brewed and malt beverages only.

=== Retail liquor ===
Retail liquor licenses can sell liquor, wine, malt, and brewed beverages for consumption on-premises. A restaurant or hotel, who has sold a customer a bottle of wine with a meal consumed on-premises, may allow the patron to take the bottle off-premises as long as it is re-sealed.

A peculiarity not found in many other states is that brewed or malt beverages can be sold for off-premises consumption in quantities less than or equal to 192 ounces (generally 6-packs and 12-packs of beer). Thus, many bars and restaurants double as beer stores.

For both types of retail licenses, serving hours are from 7:00 am to 2:00 am Monday through Saturday, and from 11:00 am to 2:00 am on Sunday, provided the establishment has a Sunday Sales Permit. There are further exceptions where one can serve earlier than 11:00 am.

Additional license categories:

- Restaurant Liquor - A restaurant that must have a minimum of 400 sq. ft. and seating for 30 patrons
- Hotel Liquor
- Municipal Golf Course Liquor
- Airport Restaurant Liquor - An airport restaurant or airport lounge, located within a TSA security checkpoint, has serving hours from 5:00 am to 2:00 am Monday through Saturday, and from 5:00 am to 2:00 am on Sunday with a Sunday Sales Permit
- Privately-Owned Public Golf Course Restaurant Liquor
- Off-Track Wagering Restaurant Liquor

=== Retail dispenser ===
Retail dispenser licenses are under the same restrictions as the retail liquor licenses, except they are limited to brewed and malt beverages only.

Additional license categories:

- Eating Place Retail Dispenser - Must have a minimum of 300 sq. ft. and seating for 30 patrons. These are generally delis or corner stores.
- Hotel Retail Dispenser
- Municipal Golf Course Retail Dispenser
- Privately-Owned Public Golf Course Eating Place Retail Dispenser

=== Club ===
Club licenses include private members-only fraternal organizations. Clubs may operate later than restaurants, until 3:00 am.

=== Distributor ===
The distributor license applies to establishments selling larger quantities of beer, generally cases and kegs.

== Alcohol sales ==
=== For consumption off-premises ===
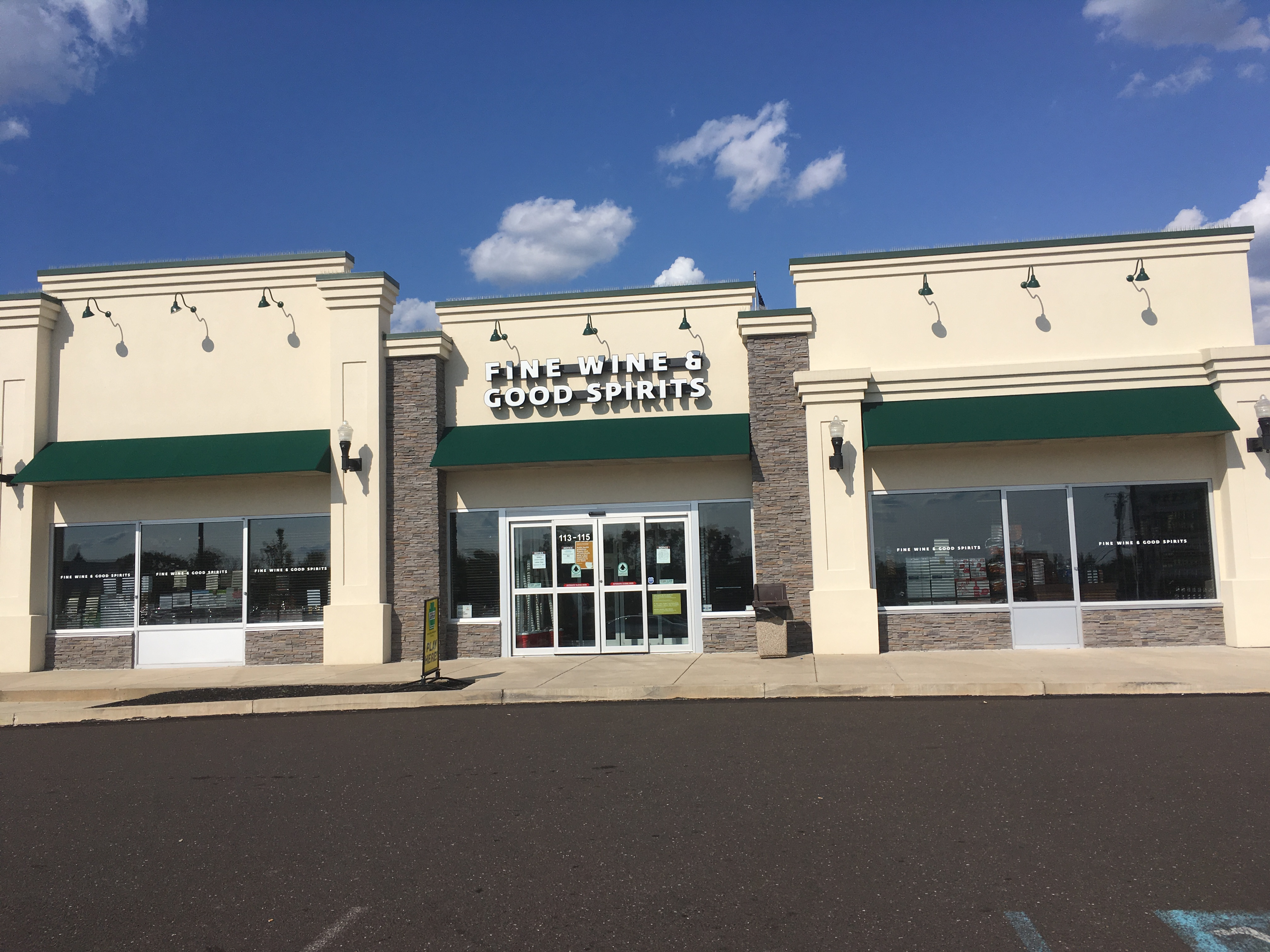
Fine Wine & Good Spirits store in Horsham, Pennsylvania

Pennsylvania is an alcoholic beverage control state. Spirits are to be sold only in the state owned Fine Wine & Good Spirits stores, which also sell wine, but not beer. Prices are generally the same throughout the state, but state stores may offer special discounts and sales, and county sales tax may cause the price to differ slightly. People under the age of 21 are allowed to enter Fine Wine & Good Spirits stores, contrary to popular belief, but only if accompanied by a parent or guardian. Monday through Saturday, a store may open as early as 9 am and close as late as 10 pm. On Sunday, many stores sell liquor from 11 am until 7 pm, depending on the district, county, and level classification of the store.

Wineries are common throughout the Commonwealth, and often sell their wines at storefronts in shopping malls; persons under the age of 21 are permitted to enter these establishments. Wine was available for a short time in supermarket kiosks, but this practice has ended. Many supermarkets now operate restaurants at which they are permitted to sell small quantities of wine as well as beer (see below).

Beer may only be purchased from a distributor or in limited quantities at many supermarkets. Beverage distributors are permitted to sell beer in any amount whereas supermarkets have quantity restrictions. Beverage distributors (which also sell soft drinks) may sell beer and malt liquor, but not wine or hard liquor. People under 21 may enter most beverage distributors without an adult, since most distributors also sell water, soda, ice, and some snack foods. They are subject to the rules of the individual establishment.

The hours of operation of beer distributors are typically similar to that of Wine and Spirits stores and other retail establishments. These hours are only restricted by the state on Sundays, where a special license is required to sell beer, and sales before 9 am are not permitted. Although state law permits late-night beer distributors, local authorities can place additional restrictions, and stores typically close before 10 pm.

Beer and wine in small quantities may be purchased from a restaurant, bar, or licensed retailer. These establishments may sell six and twelve packs of beer, along with individual bottles such as 40 ounce or 24 ounce beers. Their licenses permit them to sell up to 192 fluid ounces of beer per purchase. They may also sell up to 3 liters of wine per purchase.

Many supermarkets, including Acme, Giant/Martin's, Giant Eagle, Price Chopper/Market 32, Redner's, ShopRite, Wegmans, Weis, and Whole Foods, have begun to sell alcohol within restaurants attached to the main supermarket building, but only under very specific conditions (the restaurant must have a defined separation from the rest of the supermarket, a separate cashier, and seating for at least 30 patrons). ShopRite has begun to attach Fine Wine & Good Spirits stores to its stores.

Several convenience store chains such as Royal Farms, Rutter's, Sheetz, Turkey Hill, and Wawa sell beer and wine at select locations. For a time, Sheetz obtained a liquor license for a restaurant attached to one of its convenience stores in Altoona. After several debates, the Supreme Court of Pennsylvania ruled that the store must sell beer to in-house customers as well as take-out. The 17th Street store now again sells beer and allows limited in store consumption. In 2015, a Wawa convenience store location in Chadds Ford was given approval to sell beer as part of a pilot.

Governor Tom Wolf signed Act 39 into law on June 8, 2016, which allowed for wine sales at supermarkets, restaurants, and hotels. On August 8, 2016, Act 39 went into effect. The act also allowed for additional alcohol licenses at retailers across the state.

=== For consumption on-premises ===
Closing time for restaurants and bars in Pennsylvania is 2 am and for private clubs is 3 am.

=== Attempts to privatize ===
Pennsylvania state lawmakers have attempted to privatize the sales of wine and spirits in the commonwealth. The state has had a monopoly over the sales of wine and spirits since the repeal of Prohibition. In the 2011 legislative session, the privatization of sales of wine and spirits was the focus of some controversy. This controversy is due to the budget deficit that the commonwealth faces. Supporters of the bill argue that sales taxes and license sales could generate nearly $1 billion worth of revenue for the state.

In the 2012 session, House Majority Leader Mike Turzai, with the backing of Governor Tom Corbett, announced a plan to issue 1,600 new liquor store licenses and auction the 600-plus liquor stores currently owned by the state. Stores would be allowed to sell beer in any configuration and without limit. Supporters say it could raise as much as $1.6 billion for the state. Opponents say that the proposed pricing would make it difficult for mom-and-pop stores to afford such licenses. Major opponents include the liquor store clerks union and the Pennsylvania Beer Alliance.

== Drinking age ==
The minimum drinking age in Pennsylvania is 21 years. Minors are prohibited from purchasing, possessing, or consuming alcohol, even if it is furnished by the minor's immediate family. As is often the case in states with similarly restrictive drinking laws, there exists a small exception for religious reasons. Persons over the age of 18 are permitted to serve alcohol, so an exception is also made in the possession portion of the law in this respect.

A person under the age of 21 may also be arrested, charged, and convicted of underage drinking through constructive possession, even if they had not consumed any alcohol, simply by being in the presence of alcohol. This is mainly exercised when officials break up large parties or other events where alcohol is being consumed and the issuance of chemical tests to every individual is deemed impractical.

== Drunk driving ==
Driving, operating, or being in actual physical control of the movement of vehicle under the influence is a crime, under the Pennsylvania Vehicle Code. Pennsylvania's maximum blood alcohol level for driving is 0.08% for persons at or over the age of 21, and 0.04% for a person operating a commercial vehicle (0.02% for a school bus) with one-year suspension of the license for the first offense. For those under 21, Pennsylvania follows a "zero tolerance" policy, meaning that any BAC over 0.02% is enough to warrant a DUI (the small allowance is for certain medicinal purposes such as some cold medicines that contain alcohol). Penalties include fines, license suspension, and possible imprisonment.

== See also ==
- Sumptuary law
- Allegheny County Alcoholic Beverage Tax
- Law of Pennsylvania
