= Uniform Firearms Act =

The Uniform Firearms Act (UFA) is a set of statutes in the Commonwealth of Pennsylvania that defines the limits of Section 21 of the Pennsylvania Constitution, the right to bear arms, which predates the United States Constitution and reads: "The right of the citizens to bear arms in defense of themselves and the State shall not be questioned." The laws range in scope from use of force in self-defense situations, to specific categories of citizens that are ineligible to purchase or possess firearms.

UFA for Pennsylvania is generally a more libertarian interpretation of the right to keep and bear arms, in that it does not prohibit the sale and transfer of Class III NFA firearms, contains no duty for a citizen lawfully carrying a weapon to notify law enforcement, and mandates shall-issue licenses to carry firearms to eligible citizens.

== Object of the laws ==
The object of concealed weapons statutes is to protect the public by preventing an individual from having at hand, a weapon of which the public is unaware. The Pennsylvania Uniform Firearms Act (Pa. UFA) follows the practice of the majority of states in prohibiting and criminalizing the carrying of concealed weapons. However, the title of the law is a bit of a misnomer as the Pa. UFA does not follow the Model Penal Code. The Pa. UFA, prohibits the carrying of certain firearms in vehicles or concealed on the person without a license; prohibits ownership or possession of firearms by certain persons; provides for the licensing for concealed carry; provided strictures for dealers in firearms and; provides penalties for violations of the law. The regulation of firearms in the Commonwealth is preempted by the Legislature. That means that local municipalities, including the large municipalities, cannot regulate firearms as this is the sole province of the State Legislature. By way of illustration, a Philadelphia ordinance requiring a city license to transfer a firearm was held to be ultra-vires and struck down. Notwithstanding Sec. 6108 makes it a violation of State law to carry a firearm, rifle or shotgun, at any time on the public street or public property of any city of the first class (currently only Philadelphia), without first obtaining a license to carry a firearm.

The Pa. UFA at Sec. 6106 (a), provides that no person shall carry a firearm in any vehicle or concealed on or about his person, except in his place of abode or fixed place of business, without a license to do so. Carrying a gun in the trunk of an automobile has been held to be a violation of the law, but the Commonwealth has to establish that the person had both the power of control over the weapon and the intention to exercise that control. The burden of proof of the fact that a person carried a firearm outside of his place of abode or fixed place of business without a license rests with the Commonwealth. Where the Commonwealth cannot prove that a person carried a concealed weapon, it may nonetheless prove that the firearm was carried without a license as that offense does not require intent.

Concealment as an offense is factually specific and for a jury to decide. Where there is no evidence of an attempt to conceal a weapon, there cannot be a conviction.

The Pa. UFA prohibits the making of a loan secured by a firearm and from lending or giving a firearm to another in contravention of the law with the purpose to prevent persons with disabled (a term indicating the loss of a civil right) from possessing firearms from obtaining them by loan, gift or other transfer. However, a 2005 amendment, provides that nothing in this section prohibits the relinquishing of a firearm for safekeeping.

== Licensing Procedures and Guidelines ==
UFA establishes mandatory, statewide procedures for issuing a license to carry firearms. No municipality may establish their own rules regarding firearms, and changes to any firearms-related regulations must go through the Pennsylvania General Assembly. The act outlines the express right to a license in §6109:

- "A license to carry a firearm shall be for the purpose of carrying a firearm concealed on or about one's person or in a vehicle and shall be issued if, after an investigation not to exceed 45 days, it appears that the applicant is an individual concerning whom no good cause exists to deny the license."

Section 6111(i) of the act provides that "[a]ll information provided by the potential purchaser, transferee or applicant, including, but not limited to, the potential purchaser, transferee or applicant's name or identity, furnished by a potential purchaser or transferee under this section or any applicant for a license to carry a firearm as provided by section 6109 shall be confidential and not subject to public disclosure." A violation of this section gives rise to a private right of action against the violator for damages of "$1,000 per occurrence or three times the actual damages incurred as a result of the violation, whichever is greater, as well as reasonable attorney fees."

On December 31, 2012, a class action lawsuit captioned Doe, et al. v. City of Philadelphia, et al., was filed in the Philadelphia Court of Common Pleas against the City of Philadelphia and several of its departments for placing on its website the confidential information of more than 1,500 individuals who appealed from the denial or revocation of their gun permit, in alleged violation of Section 6111(i). The lawsuit was settled on October 29, 2014 for $1.425 million, with the City paying the cost of administering the settlement. In addition, the City agreed to make expansive changes to its firearm-related and gun permit-related policies and procedures.

== Comity and Reciprocity ==
Once a permit to carry a firearm is issued in Pennsylvania in accordance with the requirement and strictures of the law, pursuant to Sec. 6109 (k) (2) and any agreements brokers between the Attorney General of the Commonwealth and the appropriate legislatively authorizes official in a sister State, that license will be recognized in those subscribing States. This is called "reciprocity" and it is enjoyed (at this time) with the States listed below. Under Pennsylvania law, there are six categories of firearms reciprocity status.

=== Written reciprocity agreements with Pennsylvania ===
Category 1: States that have entered into written reciprocity agreements with Pennsylvania. These agreements provide for reciprocal recognition of valid permits issued by both states. Recognition in Pennsylvania varies based on the written agreement.

- Alaska
- Arizona
- Arkansas
- Florida
- Georgia
- Kentucky
- Michigan
- Mississippi
- Missouri
- New Hampshire
- North Carolina
- Oklahoma
- South Dakota
- Tennessee
- Texas
- Utah
- Virginia
- West Virginia
- Wyoming

=== Statutory reciprocity based on the determination of the Attorney General that the other state has granted reciprocity to Pennsylvania ===
Category 2: States that have statutory reciprocity under 6106(b)(15) of the Uniform Firearms Act. The following states have been granted statutory reciprocity without a formal written agreement, based on the determination of the Attorney General that the other state has granted reciprocity to Pennsylvania license holders, and that the other state's laws governing firearms are similar:

- Colorado
- Iowa
- Indiana
- Kansas
- Louisiana
- Montana
- North Dakota
- Ohio
- Wisconsin

=== Unilateral reciprocity granted by another state for Pennsylvania ===
Category 3: Unilateral reciprocity granted by another state for Pennsylvania license holders. This category encompasses states which allow an individual issued a valid License To Carry Firearms from Pennsylvania to carry a firearm while in those respective states:

- Alabama
- Idaho

=== Application states ===
Category 4: Pennsylvanians may apply for a permit from another state ("Application states"):

- Connecticut
- Hawaii
- Maine
- Maryland
- Massachusetts
- Minnesota
- Washington (State)

=== Carry Permitted Without License ===
Category 5: Pennsylvanians may carry without a license, included here for reference:

- Alaska
- Maine
- Vermont
- Arkansas

== Cities of the First Class exception ==
The act does not address the carrying of firearms in the open (also known as "open carry"). Thus it is legal to do so without a permit. However, the act states that any person may not carry a firearm in a city of the first class (Philadelphia is the only one in the Commonwealth) without a permit or falling under an exception. While carrying a firearm in the open in Philadelphia is legal for license holders, it is not a commonly used carrying technique. Philadelphia law enforcement officers are likely to detain an individual who is openly carrying a firearm.

== Criminal violations ==
Should a citizen break one or more of the enumerated statutes in the UFA, they are subject to penalties outlined in the act. Police and court officers commonly refer to the charges collectively as VUFA; or, Violation of the Uniform Firearms Act. Penalties depend on the severity of the infraction.

Some jurisdictions within the Pennsylvania Unified Court System have set up specialized court sessions to deal with violations of the Uniform Firearms Act. For example, the First Judicial District of Pennsylvania has allocated "Gun Court" sessions for defendants accused of violating certain parts of UFA. Upon conviction, the defendants can be sentenced to serve Probation under the supervision of special Gun Court Probation Officers.
