= Smith's Laws =

Collection of laws in Pennsylvania

- Publisher: Legislative Reference Bureau, Pennsylvania General Assembly

Smith's Laws is a ten volume collection of certain laws in the Province and Commonwealth of Pennsylvania from 1700 through 1829.

== See also ==
- Law of Pennsylvania
