= Law of Pennsylvania =

The law of Pennsylvania consists of several levels, including constitutional, statutory, regulatory and case law. The Pennsylvania Consolidated Statutes form the general statutory law.

== Sources ==
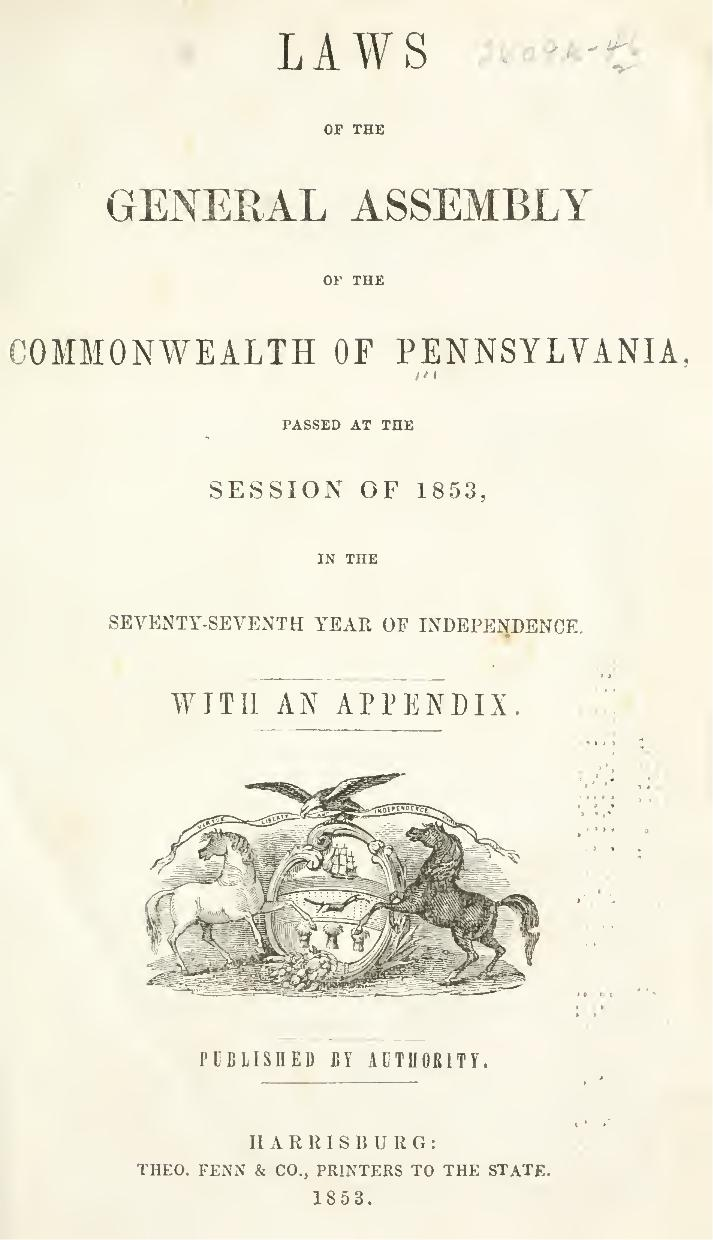
Title page of the 1853 Laws of Pennsylvania

The Constitution of Pennsylvania is the foremost source of state law. Legislation is enacted by the Pennsylvania General Assembly, published in the Laws of Pennsylvania, and codified in the Pennsylvania Consolidated Statutes. State agency regulations (sometimes called administrative law) are published in the Pennsylvania Bulletin and codified in the Pennsylvania Code.

Pennsylvania's legal system is based on common law, which is interpreted by case law through the decisions of the Supreme Court, Superior Court, and Commonwealth Court, which are published in the Pennsylvania State Reports and the Pennsylvania Reporter. Municipalities may also promulgate local ordinances. In addition, there are also several sources of persuasive authority, which are not binding authority but are useful to lawyers and judges insofar as they help to clarify the current state of the law.

=== Constitution ===
The organic source of state law is the Constitution of Pennsylvania. Although the original Constitution of Pennsylvania was ratified in 1776, more than ten years before the Constitution of the United States, the U.S. Constitution has legal supremacy in matters relating to (or, in pursuance thereof...) powers delegated to the federal government in the U.S. Constitution. The people of the States are supreme and sovereign in the constitutional U.S. system. The people of the States created the federal government and delegated to it a few enumerated powers to which it is properly limited. The current Pennsylvania Constitution dates from 1968.

=== Legislation ===
Pursuant to the state constitution, the Pennsylvania General Assembly has enacted various laws, known as "slip laws". These are published in the official Laws of Pennsylvania, also known as the "Pamphlet Laws" or generically as "session laws". Pennsylvania is currently undertaking its first official codification process in the Pennsylvania Consolidated Statutes. They are published by the Pennsylvania Legislative Reference Bureau (PALRB or LRB).

There are also several unofficial sources for statutes. The old, unofficial codification is Purdon's Pennsylvania Statutes, which is also being updated in line with the new codification as Purdon's Pennsylvania Consolidated Statutes Annotated. In addition, there are several historic sources of session laws. The Pennsylvania Statutes at Large contain charters, laws in force and obsolete laws from 1682 through 1809; publication began in 1896 and are being digitized by the LRB. Smith's Laws contain public laws in force from 1700 through 1829, and were published prior to the Statutes at Large, beginning in 1810.

=== Regulations ===
Front page of volume 45 of the Pennsylvania Bulletin

Pursuant to certain statutes, state agencies have promulgated bodies of regulations (sometimes called administrative law). The regulations are codified in the Pennsylvania Code (Pa. Code). The Pennsylvania Bulletin is the weekly gazette containing proposed, enacted and emergency rules and other notices and important documents. Changes in the Pennsylvania Code are made via the Pennsylvania Code Reporter, a monthly loose-leaf supplement. They are compiled, edited and supplemented by the Pennsylvania Legislative Reference Bureau.

=== Case law ===
The legal system of Pennsylvania is based on the common law of England, and Pennsylvania has a reception statute providing for the "reception" of English law. All statutes, regulations, and ordinances are subject to judicial review. Pursuant to common law tradition, the courts of Pennsylvania have developed a large body of case law through the decisions of the Supreme Court, Superior Court, and Commonwealth Court.

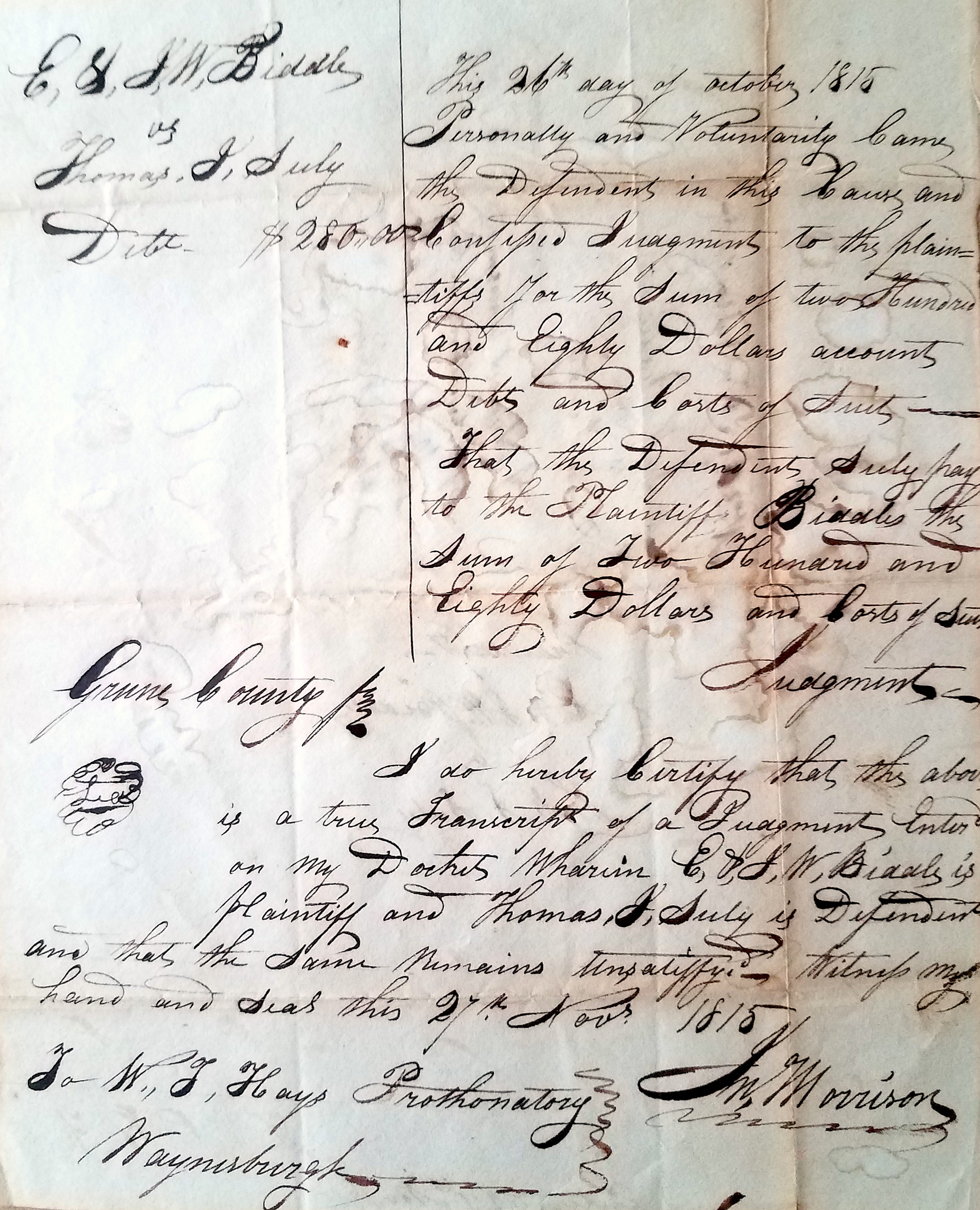
Judicial judgment of debt, Greene County, Pennsylvania, 1815

The official reporter for the Supreme Court is the Pennsylvania State Reports since 1845. There are no official reporters for either the Superior Court or the Commonwealth Court, but the Pennsylvania Reporter (a Pennsylvania-specific version of the Atlantic Reporter) is an unofficial reporter. There is no official reporting of decisions of trial courts, but County Court (Common Pleas Court) opinions are selectively published in the Pennsylvania District and County Reports (Pa. D.&C.). Many counties also publish their own reporters which contain select trial court opinions for that county. Estate and trusts trial cases are published in the Fiduciary Reporter, and local government cases (both trial and appellate) are published in Chrostwaite's Pennsylvania Municipal Law Reporter. The Administrative Office of Pennsylvania Courts also posts opinions from the Supreme Court (from November 1996), Superior Court (from December 1997), and Commonwealth Court (from January 1997) on its website.

Superior Court opinions were published in the Pennsylvania Superior Court Reports from 1895 to 1997, and Commonwealth Court opinions were published in the Pennsylvania Commonwealth Court Reports from 1970 to 1995.

=== Local ordinances ===
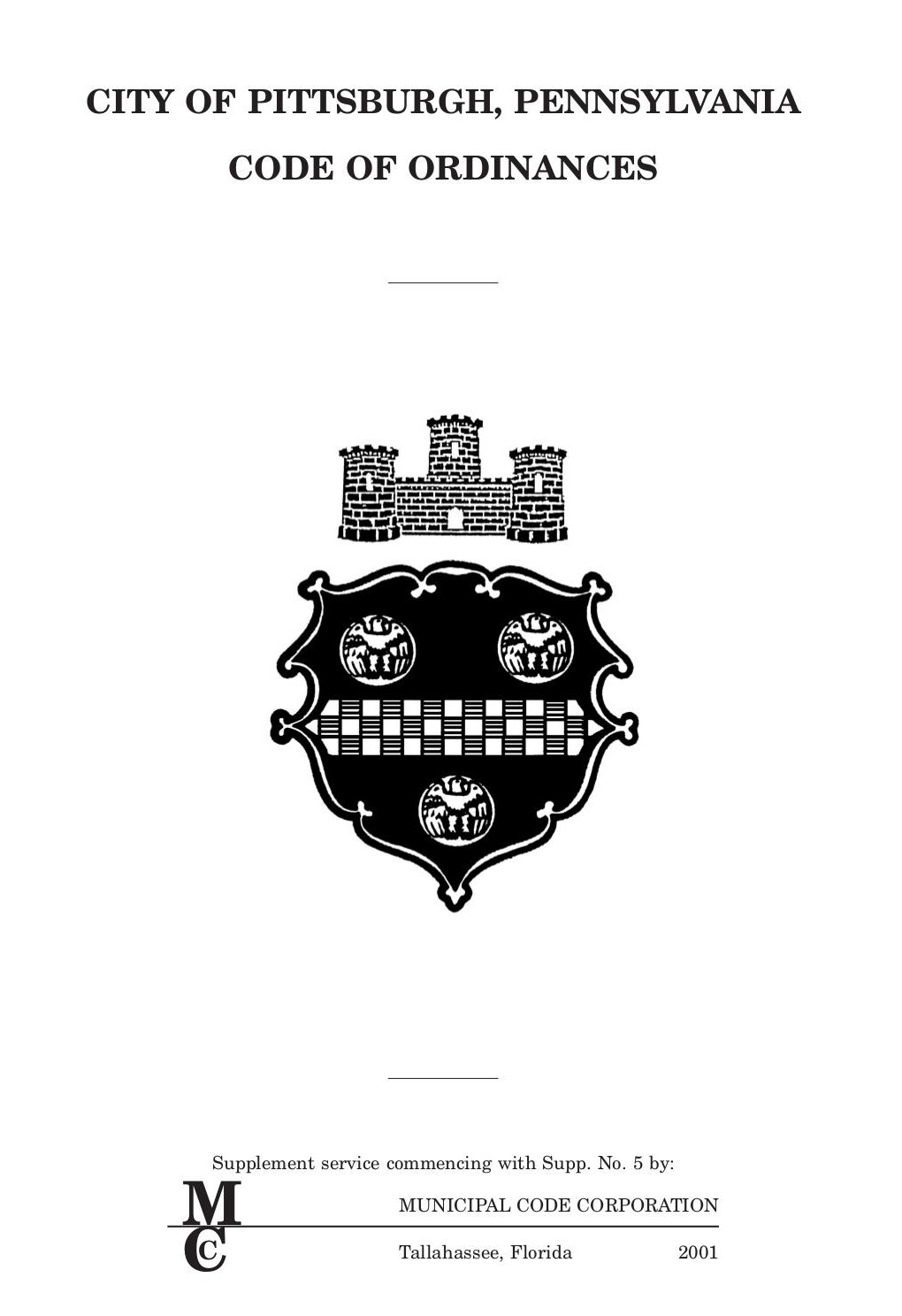
Title page of the 2001 Pittsburgh Code of Ordinances

Municipalities may enact and enforce local ordinances.

== See also ==
=== Topics ===
- Alcohol laws of Pennsylvania
- Felony murder rule (Pennsylvania)
- Gun laws in Pennsylvania
- LGBT rights in Pennsylvania
- Search and seizure law in Pennsylvania
- Pennsylvania Anatomy Act of 1883

=== Other ===
- Politics of Pennsylvania
- List of state and county courthouses in Pennsylvania
- Law enforcement in Pennsylvania
- Crime in Pennsylvania
- Law of the United States
