= Attachiamenta bonorum =

Attachiamenta bonorum, in ancient law books, denotes an attachment of chattels to recover a personal debt or estate.
