= Purdon's Pennsylvania Statutes =

Purdon’s Pennsylvania Statutes and Constitution
- Genre: Statute
- Publisher: Thomson West until 2008; Thomson Reuters since 2008

Purdon's Pennsylvania Statutes is an unofficial consolidation of the statutes of the Commonwealth of Pennsylvania, a state of the United States of America.

== Overview ==
Pennsylvania's statutes are organized into seventy-nine topic groups, ranging from "Aeronautics" to "Zoning," spread across one hundred and seven volumes.

An alternate publication, "Purdon's Pennsylvania Statutes Annotated," includes the text of statutes, as well as cross-references, footnotes, and commentary developed over two centuries. The annotated version is comparable to the United States Code Annotated.

In 2007, the Pennsylvania General Assembly struck a deal with Thomson West to post an unofficial version of the statutes for free online, making it the last state to freely provide its statutes online.

== See also ==
- Pennsylvania Consolidated Statutes
- Law of Pennsylvania
