= Laws of the General Assembly of the Commonwealth of Pennsylvania =

Book of Laws for Pennsylvania

Laws of Pennsylvania
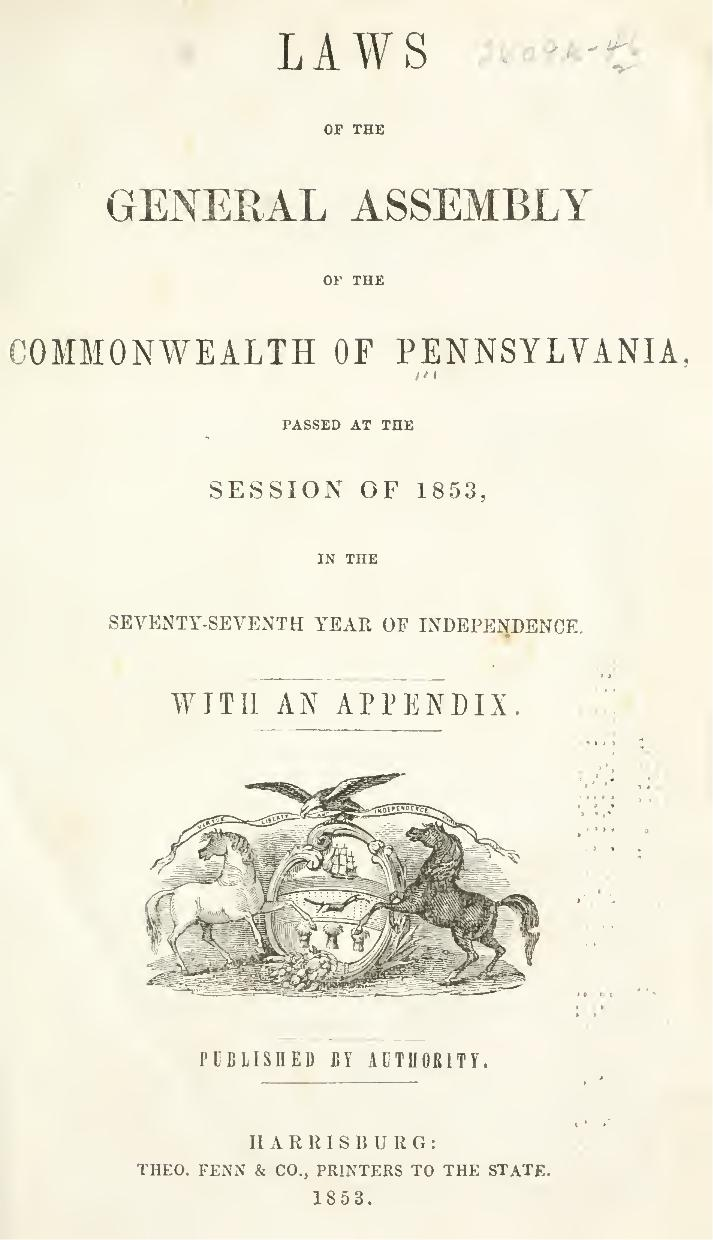
- Session of 1853
- Publisher: Legislative Reference Bureau, Pennsylvania General Assembly
- OCLC: 456555654

The Laws of the General Assembly of the Commonwealth of Pennsylvania (also known as the Pamphlet Laws or just Laws of Pennsylvania, as well as the Acts of the General Assembly of the Commonwealth of Pennsylvania) is the compilation of session laws passed by the Pennsylvania General Assembly.

== See also ==
- Pennsylvania Consolidated Statutes
- Law of Pennsylvania
- United States Statutes at Large
