= Pennsylvania Consolidated Statutes =

United States state legal code

- Publisher: Legislative Reference Bureau, Pennsylvania General Assembly

The Pennsylvania Consolidated Statutes are the official compilation of session laws enacted by the Pennsylvania General Assembly. Pennsylvania is undertaking its first official codification process. It is published by the Pennsylvania Legislative Reference Bureau (PALRB or LRB).

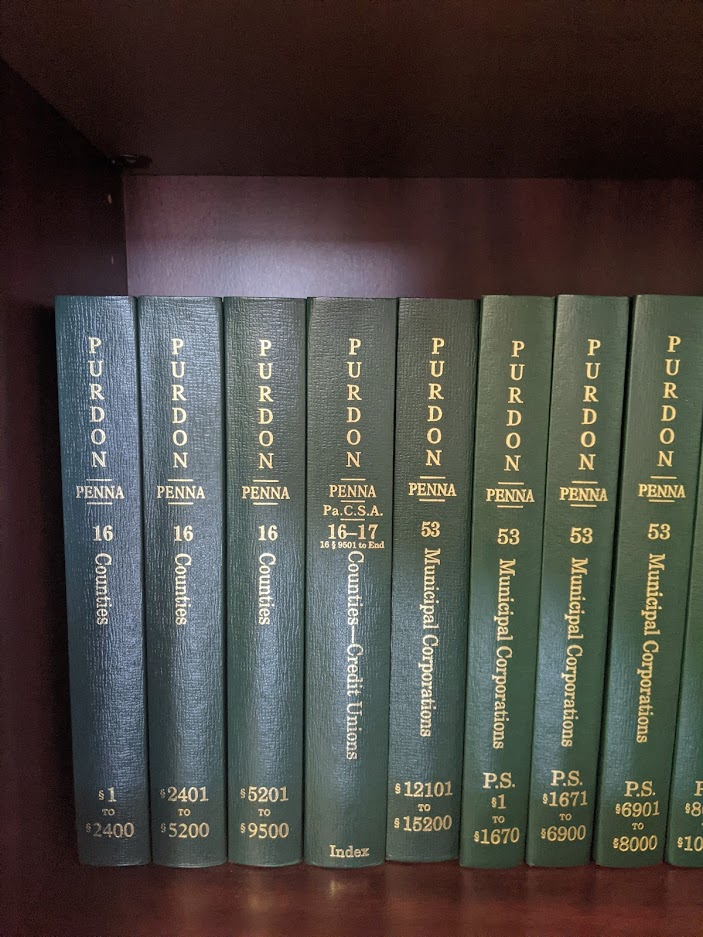
Volumes of Purdon's Pennsylvania Statutes Annotated

== List of Titles ==
There are several titles that comprise the Consolidated Statutes:

1. General Provisions
2. Administrative Law and Procedure
3. Agriculture
4. Amusements
5. Athletics and Sports
6. Bailees and Factors
7. Banks and Banking
8. Boroughs and Incorporated Towns
9. Burial Grounds
10. Charities
11. Cities
12. Commerce and Trade
13. Commercial Code
14. Community Affairs
15. Corporations and Unincorporated Associations
16. Counties
17. Credit Unions
18. Crimes and Offenses
19. (Reserved)
20. Decedents, Estates and Fiduciaries
21. (Reserved)
22. Detectives and Private Police
23. Domestic Relations
24. Education
25. Elections
26. Eminent Domain
27. Environmental Resources
28. Escheats
29. Federal Relations
30. Fish
31. Food
32. Forests, Waters and State Parks
33. Frauds, Statute of
34. Game
35. Health and Safety
36. Highways and Bridges
37. Historical and Museums
38. Holidays and Observances
39. Insolvency and Assignments
40. Insurance
41. (Reserved)
42. Judiciary and Judicial Procedure
43. Labor
44. Law and Justice
45. Legal Notices
46. Legislature
47. Liquor
48. Lodging and Housing
49. Mechanics' Liens
50. Mental Health
51. Military Affairs
52. Mines and Mining
53. Municipalities Generally
54. Names
55. (Reserved)
56. (Reserved)
57. Notaries Public
58. Oil and Gas
59. Partnerships
60. Peddlers
61. Prisons and Parole
62. Procurement
63. Professions and Occupations (State Licensed)
64. Public Authorities and Quasi-Public Corporations
65. Public Officers
66. Public Utilities
67. Public Welfare
68. Real and Personal Property
69. Savings Associations
70. Securities
71. State Government
72. Taxation and Fiscal Affairs
73. Townships
74. Transportation
75. Vehicles
76. Weights, Measures and Standards
77. Workmen's Compensation
78. Zoning and Planning
79. Supplemental Provisions

== See also ==
- Purdon's Pennsylvania Statutes
- Laws of Pennsylvania
- Law of Pennsylvania
- United States Code
