= Pennsylvania Bulletin =

Weekly journal produced by the Commonwealth of Pennsylvania

- Type: Weekly government gazette
- Publisher: Fry Communications
- Editor: Pennsylvania Legislative Reference Bureau
- Headquarters: Pennsylvania Code and Bulletin; Legislative Reference Bureau; Main Capitol, Room 674; Harrisburg, PA 17120
- Website: www.pabulletin.com

The Pennsylvania Bulletin is a weekly journal produced by the Commonwealth of Pennsylvania. Created on a weekly basis by staff in the Legislative Reference Bureau of Pennsylvania, which is housed at the Pennsylvania State Capitol building in Harrisburg, Pennsylvania, this publication serves as "the Commonwealth's official gazette for information and rulemaking" and is released for public consumption each Friday at 9 a.m. It lists the recent changes made to various agency rules and regulations within Pennsylvania's state government system and serves as a supplement to the Pennsylvania Code.

== History ==
In 1968, legislators of the Commonwealth of Pennsylvania realized that improvements needed to be made in the way changes to state laws were communicated to state employees and members of the general public. In response, they passed the Commonwealth Documents Law (CDL) (P.L. 769, No. 240) (45 P.S. §§ 1102–1208) on July 31, 1968, establishing the Pennsylvania Code and the Pennsylvania Bulletin. According to the Commonwealth's style manual for the Bulletin, "It also provided a means by which interested citizens could participate in the making of policy before it was adopted."

According to Title 45, Chapter 7 of the Consolidated Statutes of the Commonwealth of Pennsylvania ("Codification and Publication of Documents"), it is the Legislative Reference Bureau's responsibility "to compile, edit and supplement or to contract through the department for the compilation, editing and supplementation of an official legal codification, to be divided into titles of convenient size and scope, and to be known as the 'Pennsylvania Code'"; the bureau performs this function under "the policy supervision and direction of the joint committee."

=== Contents ===
Defined by Section 702 of Title 45 of the Consolidated Statutes of the Commonwealth of Pennsylvania ("Codification and Publication of Documents"), the contents of the Pennsylvania Code, which are published in the Pennsylvania Bulletin, include:

1. All gubernatorial proclamations and executive orders that are "general and permanent in nature";
2. All regulations ("administrative and other");
3. All policy statements that are "general and permanent in nature";
4. All documentation classes or individual documents that are "required to be codified in the code by statute";
5. All general rules;
6. All "rules of court";
7. Any other judicial documentation class or individual judicial document that "the governing authority of the unified judicial system finds to be general and permanent in nature"; and
8. Any other documentation class or individual document that Pennsylvania's Governor, joint committee, or Legislative Reference Bureau director deems "general and permanent in nature."

Additionally, "[e]xcept as otherwise provided by regulations promulgated by the joint committee," these other documents may also be published in the Pennsylvania Bulletin:

1. All gubernatorial proclamations and executive orders "except such as have no general applicability and legal effect or are effective only against Commonwealth agencies or persons in their capacity as officers, agents or employees thereof";
2. Each "agency notice directed to the public" regarding "proceedings conducted under any statute the expense of the administration of which is by law assessed directly against the class of persons regulated or supervised thereunder";
3. Each agency document that Pennsylvania law requires "to be published, or the expense of publication of which is specially assumed by the agency filing such document";
4. Every legislative document that is "filed with the Legislative Reference Bureau pursuant to a resolution adopted by either House of the General Assembly";
5. Every judicial document "filed with the Legislative Reference Bureau by the Administrative Office of Pennsylvania Courts"; and
6. Any other documentation class or individual document that Pennsylvania's Governor, joint committee, or Legislative Reference Bureau director "may require or authorize to be published in the bulletin."

== See also ==
- Pennsylvania Code
- Law of Pennsylvania
- Federal Register
