= Pennsylvania Department of General Services =

Government agency of Pennsylvania

- Logo of the DGS

Agency overview
- Formed: July 22, 1975
- Preceding agencies: Department of Property and Supplies; General State Authority
- Jurisdiction: State government of Pennsylvania
- Headquarters: 515 North Office Building Harrisburg, Pennsylvania; 40°15′56.5″N 76°52′59″W
- Employees: 812
- Agency executive: Reggie McNeil, Secretary of General Services
- Website: https://www.dgs.pa.gov

The Pennsylvania Department of General Services (DGS) is an agency of the U.S. state of Pennsylvania that supports the core operations of the Pennsylvania state government.

DGS builds all non-highway Capital projects, procures nearly $4 billion of goods and services, serves as the real estate agent for state-owned land and leases, oversees the Commonwealth vehicle fleet, maintains all state-owned facilities, implements an energy-management and conservation initiative in all state-owned buildings, serves as the state's insurance broker, monitors participation in state contracts by small and small diverse businesses, manages federal and state surplus and supplies, and oversees the Capitol Police, Commonwealth Media Services, and the Bureau of Publications.

DGS was created by Act 45 of 1975. This legislation combined the duties of the Department of Property and Supplies and the General State Authority (GSA) to form the Department of General Services.

== Organizational structure ==
The DGS is divided into the following sub-units:

- Deputy Secretary of Administration
  - Bureau of Finance and Risk Management
  - Bureau of Human Resources
  - Commonwealth Media Services
  - Bureau of Publications
- Deputy Secretary for Diversity, Inclusion, and Small Business Opportunities
  - Bureau of Diversity, Inclusion and Small Business Opportunities
- Deputy Secretary for Procurement
  - Bureau of Procurement
  - Bureau of Vehicle Management
  - Bureau of Supplies and Surplus Operations
  - Commonwealth Agency Recycling Office
  - Office of Enterprise Wireless Management
- Deputy Secretary for Property and Asset Management
  - Bureau of Police and Safety
  - Bureau of Facilities Management
  - Energy and Resource Management Office
  - GreenGov Council
  - Special Events Office
- Deputy Secretary for Capital Programs
  - Bureau of Capital Projects Construction
  - Bureau of Capital Projects Planning and Procurement
  - Bureau of Capital Project Design Management
  - Office of Workplace Operations
- Office of Chief Counsel

== See also ==
- List of Pennsylvania state agencies

== Notes ==
- "Cabinet-level agencies". The Pennsylvania Manual. Vol. 118. Harrisburg, PA: Pennsylvania Department of General Services. 2007. Archived from the original on October 1, 2011.
