= Constitution of Pennsylvania =

Supreme law of Pennsylvania, United States

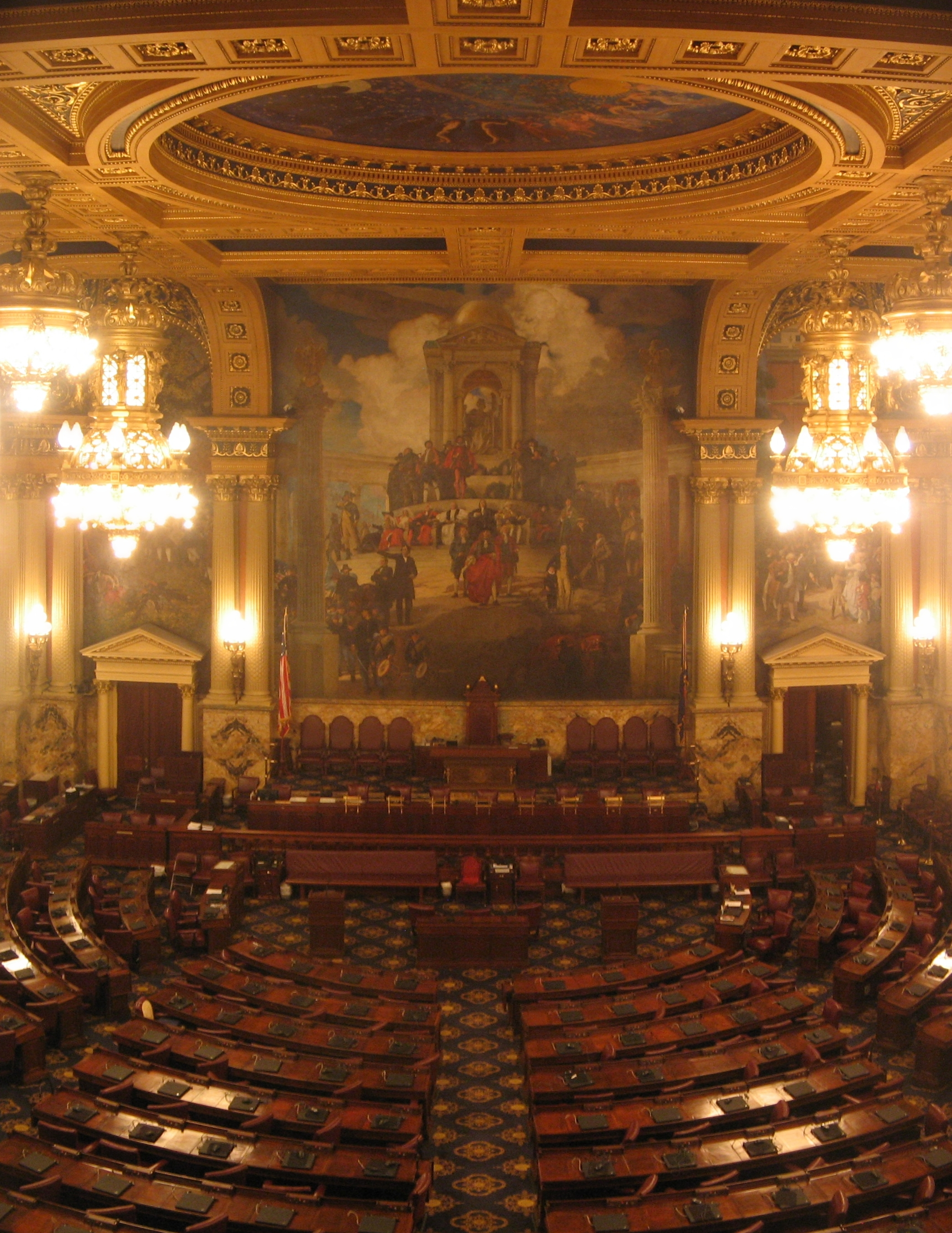
The Pennsylvania House of Representatives chamber in Harrisburg, Pennsylvania with the portrait Apotheosis of Pennsylvania visible on the far wall of the chamber

The Constitution of the Commonwealth of Pennsylvania is the supreme law within the Commonwealth of Pennsylvania. All acts of the General Assembly, the governor, and each governmental agency are subordinate to it. Since 1776, Pennsylvania's Constitution has undergone five versions. Pennsylvania held constitutional conventions in 1776, 1789–90, 1837–38, 1872–73, and 1967–68. The current Constitution entered into force in 1968, and has been amended numerous times.

The Constitution may only be amended if a proposed modification receives a majority vote of two consecutive sessions of the General Assembly and then is approved by the electorate. Emergency amendments are permitted by a vote of two-thirds of the General Assembly and an affirmative vote by the electorate within one month. In such emergency situations, commonwealth election officials are required to publish notice of the referendum on a proposed amendment in a minimum of two newspapers in every county. In an event that more than one emergency amendment is proposed, each additional amendment is to be voted on separately.

== History ==
Pennsylvania has had five constitutions during its statehood: 1776, 1790, 1838, 1874, and 1968. Prior to that, the colonial Province of Pennsylvania was governed by the Frame of Government, written by William Penn, of which there were four versions: 1682, 1683, 1696, and 1701.

Each of the five constitutions reflected changing political circumstances and disagreements over the distribution of governmental power between the legislature and executive, and the rights of Pennsylvania's inhabitants. The constitutions of 1790, 1838, and 1874 each substantially revised the structure and limitations of state government, while the constitutional changes of 1968 modernized many of the institutional structures established under the 1874 constitution.

Colonial constitutional development in Pennsylvania began with the grant of the province to William Penn in 1681. Penn established the institutions of the proprietary government through his Frame of Government of Pennsylvania, which reflected his commitments to religious toleration and representative government. The original Frame of 1682 was revised in 1683, and again 1696, followed by the Charter of Privileges of 1701. The colonial assembly and framework for government set up in these documents continued with only minor modifications until the American Revolution.

The Pennsylvania Constitution of 1776 contained several innovations that were quite radical for that era. Many of these changes came directly from other sources or complaints regarding the old ways of government. These innovations all expanded the democracy of the constitution. The most noticeable change in the new constitution is that all men who had paid taxes were permitted to vote, an innovation because it was somewhat less restrictive than the requirement that voters own property. Voting rights now included African American men who paid this tax.

Additionally, a unicameral legislature, with members elected for one term, was put in place by the constitution. The goal of this change was to prevent the elite from having sole control over the government. There was no house for the aristocracy, but rather just one that was controlled by the large number of newly enfranchised people who could replace the legislature every year. This was highly contested by the colonists given it, "presupposed a social condition that did not exist," as not all citizens of the state were equal in wealth and wisdom. Additionally, the government had a twelve-member Supreme Executive Council to administer the government, made up of a small council and a president elected by the Assembly and Council together. Thomas Wharton Jr. was chosen in 1777 to be the first President of the Supreme Executive Council. This group was not granted a veto, nor were they given much other power at all.

The constitution of 1790 replaced the revolutionary governmental structure of 1776 with a system more closely resembling the division of powers established by the federal Constitution.

The era of Jacksonian democracy brought demands for broader political participation, accompanied by opposition to the concentration executive power and political patronage, which were criticized as flaws of the 1790 constitution. A constitutional convention in 1837–1838 proposed revisions, which were narrowly approved by voters due to opposition by Philadelphia's black community to a provision limiting voting to whites. The new constitution also reduced the governor's permitted tenure from nine years in twelve to six years in nine and curtailed executive appointment powers, and replaced judicial tenure during good behavior with fixed terms, including fifteen year terms for justices of the Supreme Court of Pennsylvania.

Concerns arising out of industrialization and urbanization contributed to demands for another constitutional convention in 1874. It was approved by 70 percent of voters in its ratification election.

== The Constitution (1968, as amended) ==
The current Constitution of Pennsylvania comprises the following concise Preamble, and Articles and Schedules:

=== Preamble ===
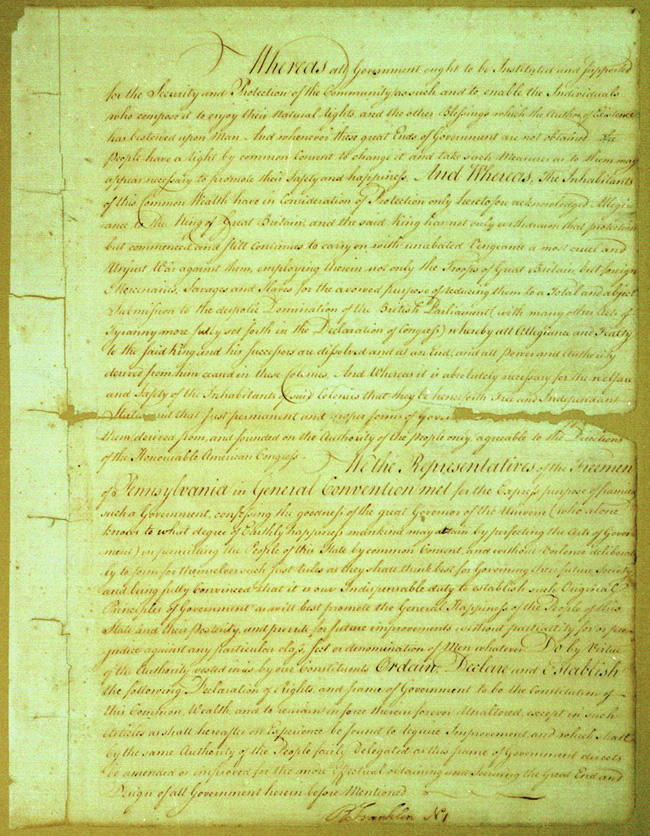
The Pennsylvania Constitution of 1776

WE, the people of the Commonwealth of Pennsylvania, grateful to Almighty God for the blessings of civil and religious liberty, and humbly invoking His guidance, do ordain and establish this Constitution.

=== Articles and schedules ===
- Article I: Declaration of Rights
- Article II: The Legislature
- Article III: Legislation
- Article IV: The Executive
- Article V: The Judiciary
- Article VI: Public Officers
- Article VII: Elections
- Article VIII: Taxation and Finance
- Article IX: Local Government
- Article X: Private Corporations
- Article XI: Amendments
- Schedule NO. 1 (Adopted with the Constitution)
- Schedule NO. 2 (Amendments of November 2, 1909)
- Appendix

== See also ==
- Pennsylvania Constitution of 1776
- Law of Pennsylvania
