= List of Pennsylvania state historical markers in Dauphin County =

Location of Dauphin County in Pennsylvania

This is a list of the Pennsylvania state historical markers in Dauphin County.

This is intended to be a complete list of the official state historical markers placed in Dauphin County, Pennsylvania by the Pennsylvania Historical and Museum Commission (PHMC). The locations of the historical markers, as well as the latitude and longitude coordinates as provided by the PHMC's database, are included below when available. There are 81 historical markers located in Dauphin County.

== Historical markers ==
Marker title	Image	Date dedicated	Location	Marker type	Topics
Abraham Lincoln		April 9, 1953	S. Market Square (E side), Harrisburg; 40.2595°N 76.8817°W	City	Abraham Lincoln, Government & Politics, Government & Politics 19th Century
Barnett's Fort		December 22, 1947	Pa. 39, 1.3 miles E of Linglestown near intersection with Piketown Rd. 40.3517°N 76.765°W	Roadside	Early Settlement, Forts, French & Indian War, Military, Native American
Burd Tombs		September 23, 1946	Pa. 441, N. Union St. at Park Circle Rd., Middletown; 40.2032°N 76.733°W	Roadside	French & Indian War, Military
C. DeLores Tucker (1927-2005)		April 25, 2006	North St. between 3rd & Commonwealth, Harrisburg	Roadside	African American, Civil Rights, Government & Politics 20th Century, Women
Camel Back Bridge		October 19, 1953	Riverfront Park, Front & Market Sts., Harrisburg; 40.2588°N 76.8837°W	City	Bridges, Transportation
Camp Curtin		April 18, 1992	6th & Woodbine Sts., in the park, Harrisburg; 40.2823°N 76.8915°W	City	Civil War, Military
Camp George Gordon Meade		October 10, 1966	Pa. 441 at Middletown Area High School near Pa. Turnpike overpass 40.2113°N 76.7362°W	Roadside	Civil War, Military
Chocolate Workers' Sit-down Strike		September 10, 2005	Cocoa Ave. near Caracas Ave., Hershey; 40.284617°N 76.64923°W	Roadside	Business & Industry, Government & Politics 20th Century, Labor
Col. James Burd		September 23, 1946	Pa. 230 in Highspire; 40.20467°N 76.77868°W	Roadside	American Revolution, Forts, French & Indian War, Military
Col. Timothy Green		February 24, 1948	Claster Blvd., east side, just N of Hemlock, Dauphin; 40.37193°N 76.93183°W	Roadside	American Revolution, French & Indian War, Military
Dauphin County		December 9, 1982	Courthouse, Front & Market Sts., Harrisburg; 40.2587°N 76.883°W	City	Government & Politics, Government & Politics 18th Century
Derry Church		February 28, 1948	At church, 248 E. Derry Rd., Hershey; 40.2925°N 76.6462°W	Roadside	Buildings, Early Settlement, Religion, William Penn
Derry Churchyard		February 28, 1948	U.S. 422 (E. Chocolate Ave.) at E. Mansion Rd., Hershey; 40.2922°N 76.6415°W	Roadside	American Revolution, Early Settlement, French & Indian War, Military, Religion
Eagle Hotel		February 25, 1953	At former 21 N. 2nd St., Harrisburg (MISSING)	City	Buildings, Business & Industry, Inns & Taverns
Executive Mansion		November 24, 1970	101 S. 2nd St. (at Chestnut), Harrisburg; 40.2588°N 76.8803°W	City	Government & Politics, Government & Politics 19th Century, Governors, Mansions & Manors
Executive Mansion		March 3, 1966	Riverfront Park, opposite former 311-313 N. Front St., at Barbara St., Harrisburg; 40.2612°N 76.8873°W	Roadside	Government & Politics, Government & Politics 19th Century, Mansions & Manors
Fort Halifax		September 23, 1946	Pa. 147, .5 mile N of Halifax; 40.4788°N 76.9317°W	Roadside	Forts, French & Indian War, Military
Fort Halifax - PLAQUE		May 1926	Route 147, 1/2 mile N of Halifax, W side 40.4788°N 76.9312°W	Plaque	Forts, French & Indian War, Military
Fort Hunter		July 3, 1947	5300 N. Front St. (old U.S. 22 & 322), .5 mile N of Rockville Bridge, Harrisburg; 40.3422°N 76.9097°W	Roadside	Forts, French & Indian War, Military
Fort Hunter - PLAQUE		November 1916	N. Front St. (W side) opposite Fort Hunter Rd. N of Rockville	Plaque	Forts, French & Indian War, Military
Fort Manada		November 19, 1970	Pa. 443 between Manada Gap and Penn National Race Course; 40.395°N 76.6837°W	Roadside	American Revolution, Forts, Military
Genevieve Blatt		October 12, 2000	Riverfront Park at Liberty Street (one block north of State St.), Harrisburg; 40.2628°N 76.8893°W	Roadside	Government & Politics, Government & Politics 20th Century, Women
Governor's Residence		n/a	Front St. (Riverfront Park) near Maclay St., Harrisburg; 40.2773°N 76.8997°W	Roadside	Buildings, Government & Politics, Government & Politics 20th Century, Governors, Mansions & Manors
Governor's Residence		n/a	Second St. near Maclay St., Harrisburg; 40.2778°N 76.8987°W	City	Buildings, Government & Politics, Government & Politics 20th Century, Governors, Mansions & Manors
Grace Methodist Church		June 10, 1968	State St. between 2nd & 3rd Sts., Harrisburg; 40.2637°N 76.8862°W	City	Religion
Hanover Church		December 10, 1947	U.S. 22 at Pa. 743, 13.4 miles NE of Harrisburg; 40.372°N 76.6507°W	Roadside	American Revolution, Early Settlement, French & Indian War, Religion
Hanover Resolves		September 23, 1946	U.S. 22, at 10105 Allentown Blvd., 14 miles NE of Harrisburg; 40.3767°N 76.6422°W	Roadside	American Revolution, Military
Harris' Ferry		November 23, 1970	Riverfront Park (opposite Harris/Cameron Mansion), S. Front St., Harrisburg (Missing); 40.2558°N 76.8787°W	Roadside	Transportation
Harrisburg		September 23, 1946	U.S. 230 S of Harrisburg at Steelton line 40.2418°N 76.8565°W	Roadside	Cities & Towns, Government & Politics, Government & Politics 19th Century, Transportation
Harrisburg		September 23, 1946	U.S. 22 E of Harrisburg at city line, opposite entrance to Reservoir Park; 40.274°N 76.8593°W	Roadside	Cities & Towns, Government & Politics, Government & Politics 19th Century, Transportation
Harrisburg		September 23, 1946	Paxton St. at 29th St., Harrisburg; 40.2558°N 76.8392°W	Roadside	Cities & Towns, Government & Politics, Government & Politics 19th Century, Transportation
Harrisburg		September 23, 1946	U.S. 22 (Front St. at Vaughn), Harrisburg; 40.3003°N 76.9042°W	Roadside	Cities & Towns, Early Settlement, Government & Politics, Government & Politics 19th Century, Transportation
Harrisburg		August 1, 1947	Front St. and Vaughn St., Harrisburg	Roadside	Cities & Towns, Government & Politics, Government & Politics 19th Century, Transportation
Harrisburg Cemetery		September 30, 1990	NE corner, 13th & State Sts., Harrisburg; 40.2695°N 76.8722°W	Roadside	American Revolution, Buildings, Government & Politics, Military, Religion
Harrisburg Giants		August 18, 2005	Roadway between Walnut St. Bridge and Commerce Bank Park, City Island, Harrisburg	Roadside	African American, Baseball, Sports
Harrisburg State Hospital		October 7, 1987	N. Cameron St. (U.S. 22/230) at hospital entrance, Harrisburg; 40.2848°N 76.8815°W	Roadside	Medicine & Science, Professions & Vocations
Hershey		March 2, 2003	Rte. 422 (on north side, near 19 E. Chocolate Ave.), Hershey; 40.2865°N 76.6487°W	Roadside	Business & Industry, Cities & Towns, Education, Government & Politics 20th Century, Transportation
Hummelstown Brownstone Quarries		October 29, 2005	104 E Main St., Hummelstown; 40.26553°N 76.7056°W	City	Business & Industry, Ethnic & Immigration, Labor
J. Donald Cameron		December 8, 1997	Front and State Sts., Harrisburg; 40.2622°N 76.8887°W	City	Government & Politics, Government & Politics 19th Century, Mansions & Manors
J. Horace McFarland		June 9, 1995	Sunken Garden in Riverfront Park, Front & Verbeke Sts., Harrisburg; 40.268°N 76.8932°W	Roadside	Environment, Government & Politics, Government & Politics 20th Century, Professions & Vocations, Writers
John Harris' Gift		August 10, 1953	Capitol Park, 3rd & Walnut Sts., Harrisburg; 40.262°N 76.8823°W	City	Government & Politics, Government & Politics 18th Century
John Harris Mansion		August 23, 1946	219 S. Front St. at mansion, Harrisburg; 40.2563°N 76.8792°W	Roadside	Buildings, Mansions & Manors
Lincoln Cemetery		June 21, 1994	30th Street & Booser Ave., Penbrook; 40.28°N 76.8447°W	City	African American, Civil War, Religion
Market Square		February 25, 1953	S. Market Square (east side, near Market St.), Harrisburg; 40.2595°N 76.8815°W	City	Agriculture, Business & Industry, Inns & Taverns
Middletown		April 17, 1952	351 N Union St. at Main (center square), Middletown; 40.1978°N 76.7362°W	Roadside	Cities & Towns
Millersburg Ferry		October 22, 1972	Pa. 147 at Market & North Sts., Millersburg; 40.5412°N 76.9623°W	Roadside	Oil & Gas, Transportation
Milton S. Hershey		June 28, 2003	Homestead Lane, 20 feet north of U.S. 322, Hershey; 40.2758°N 76.6338°W	Roadside	Business & Industry, Education, Entrepreneurs
Mira Lloyd Dock		August 30, 1996	North Front Street near Reily St., Harrisburg; 40.2698°N 76.8947°W	City	Education, Environment, Government & Politics, Government & Politics 20th Century, Women, Writers
Nuclear Accident at Three Mile Island		March 25, 1999	River Rd. (PA 441), S of Royalton (1 mile S of the main gate to Three Mile Island); 40.1527°N 76.7177°W	Roadside	Business & Industry, Environment, Government & Politics
Old Brick Capitol		August 11, 1953	Main entrance to Capitol (in lawn north of steps), Third and State Streets, Harrisburg; 40.2642°N 76.8843°W	City	Government & Politics, Government & Politics 19th Century
Old Courthouses		April 10, 1953	Market St. between 2nd & 3rd Sts., Harrisburg (Missing); 40.2605°N 76.8813°W	City	Government & Politics, Government & Politics 18th Century
Old Salem Church		June 11, 1968	Chestnut St. between 2nd & 3rd Sts., Harrisburg; 40.2593°N 76.8797°W	City	Religion
Patton's Fort		December 22, 1947	Linglestown Rd. (PA 39) at Patton Rd., 1.4 miles W of Linglestown; 40.33661°N 76.82052°W	Roadside	Forts, French & Indian War, Military, Native American
Paxtang Manor		August 1, 1953	Riverfront Park, Front & Calder Sts., Harrisburg; 40.2688°N 76.894°W	City	Cities & Towns
Paxton Church		December 3, 1947	At church on Paxtang Ave., near Sharon St., Paxtang; 40.263°N 76.8317°W	Roadside	Buildings, Early Settlement, Religion
Paxton Church		December 19, 1947	3700 block Derry St. near Wilhelm Rd., Paxtang; 40.2587°N 76.8273°W	Roadside	Buildings, Religion
Paxton Riflemen		December 24, 1947	U.S. 22, 5.7 miles NE of Harrisburg; 40.3243°N 76.7807°W	Roadside	American Revolution, Military
Pennsylvania Canal		August 10, 1953	At Forum Building, Walnut St. at 5th St., Harrisburg, 40.2638°N 76.8807°W	City	Canals, Navigation, Transportation
Pennsylvania Canal (Eastern Division)		July 2, 1952	Rt. 147, just off exit from US 22/322 (east side of Clarks Ferry Bridge), Dauphin	Roadside	Bridges, Business & Industry, Canals, Coal, Iron, Navigation, Transportation
Pennsylvania Canal (Juniata Division)		June 12, 1952	U.S. 11 & 15 (E side), SW of Amity Hall and NE of Duncannon	Roadside	Canals, Navigation, Transportation
Pennsylvania Farm Show		January 7, 1991	Maclay St. near Cameron (U.S. 22 and 230), at Farm Show Complex, Harrisburg; 40.283°N 77.0988°W	Roadside	Agriculture, Business & Industry, Sports
Pennsylvania State Archives		March 10, 2003	North Third Street near Forster, at entrance to Pennsylvania State Archives, Harrisburg; 40.2662°N 76.8867°W	Roadside	Education, Government & Politics, Government & Politics 20th Century
Pennsylvania State Police		September 13, 2005	Hershey School District Memorial Field Complex, Cocoa Ave., Hershey; 40.280217°N 76.64653°W	Roadside	Coal, Education, Government & Politics 20th Century, Labor, Police and Safety
Presidential Convention		August 11, 1953	15 S. 4th St. at Zion Lutheran Church, Harrisburg; 40.2617°N 76.8793°W	City	Government & Politics, Government & Politics 19th Century
Public Sector Unionism		September 9, 2005	State St., near 3rd, Harrisburg	City	Government & Politics 20th Century, Labor
Rockville Bridge		April 29, 2010	N Front St. in Susquehanna Twp., at Fort Hunter's Heckton Church; 40.33874°N 76.90752°W	Roadside	Bridges, Business & Industry, Railroads
Saint Peter's Kierch		February 28, 1969	At church, Union & High Sts., Middletown; 40.2012°N 76.7325°W	Roadside	Religion
Simon Girty		June 16, 2001	Front St. at Fort Hunter Park, Middle Paxton Twp., just N of Harrisburg; 40.3423°N 76.9097°W	Roadside	American Revolution, Early Settlement, Exploration, Native American, War of 1812
State Capitol		August 11, 1953	Main entrance to Capitol (south of steps), Harrisburg; 40.2645°N 76.8847°W	City	Government & Politics, Government & Politics 20th Century
State Museum of Pennsylvania		September 21, 2005	Museum lawn, 3rd & North Streets, Harrisburg	Roadside	Buildings, Education, Government & Politics 20th Century
T. Morris Chester		December 3, 1986	Market Street near 3rd St., Harrisburg; 40.2607°N 76.8812°W	City	African American, Civil War, Education, Military, Professions & Vocations, Underground Railroad
U.S. Colored Troops Grand Review		May 6, 2006	Soldier's Grove behind Capitol, Walnut / 7th St. across from State St. Bridge, Harrisburg	Roadside	African American, Civil War, Military
Underground Railroad		April 29, 2000	In Tanner's Alley, now Capitol Park, Walnut St. near Commonwealth Ave., Harrisburg; 40.2628°N 76.8815°W	City	African American, Religion, Underground Railroad
Union Canal		March 1, 1948	Allentown Blvd. / Wm. Penn Hwy. (US 22) at Hershey Rd. (PA 39), 9.3 miles NE of Harrisburg; 40.3388°N 76.7128°W	Roadside	Canals, Navigation, Transportation, William Penn
Union Canal		March 1, 1948	S. Hanover St. near Hershey Park Drive, Union Deposit; 40.2858°N 76.6787°W	Roadside	Canals, Navigation, Transportation, William Penn
Union Canal		April 1, 1950	E Main St. / E Harrisburg Pk. (PA 230) between RR tracks & Swatara Creek, E end of Middletown; 40.1917°N 76.7318°W	Roadside	Canals, Navigation, Transportation
Walnut Street Bridge		n/a	City Island at West end of bridge, Harrisburg; 40.2558°N 76.8882°W	City	Bridges, Transportation
Wildwood Park		November 17, 2005	intersection of Industrial Rd. & Wildwood Way, Harrisburg; 40.30773°N 76.88682°W	Roadside	Cities & Towns, Education, Environment, Medicine & Science
William Howard Day		May 26, 1997	Lincoln & Carlisle Sts., Steelton; 40.2432°N 76.8383°W	Roadside	African American, Education, Professions & Vocations, Religion, Underground Railroad, Writers
William Maclay		September 23, 1946	Riverfront Park, Front & South Sts., Harrisburg; 40.2618°N 76.8883°W	Roadside	George Washington, Government & Politics, Government & Politics 18th Century
Wilt Chamberlain's Scoring Record		March 2, 2002	100 Hersheypark Dr. (Hersheypark Arena), Hershey; 40.2887°N 76.6567°W	Roadside	African American, Basketball, Sports

== See also ==
- List of Pennsylvania state historical markers
- National Register of Historic Places listings in Dauphin County, Pennsylvania
