= Underground Railroad in Harrisburg, Pennsylvania =

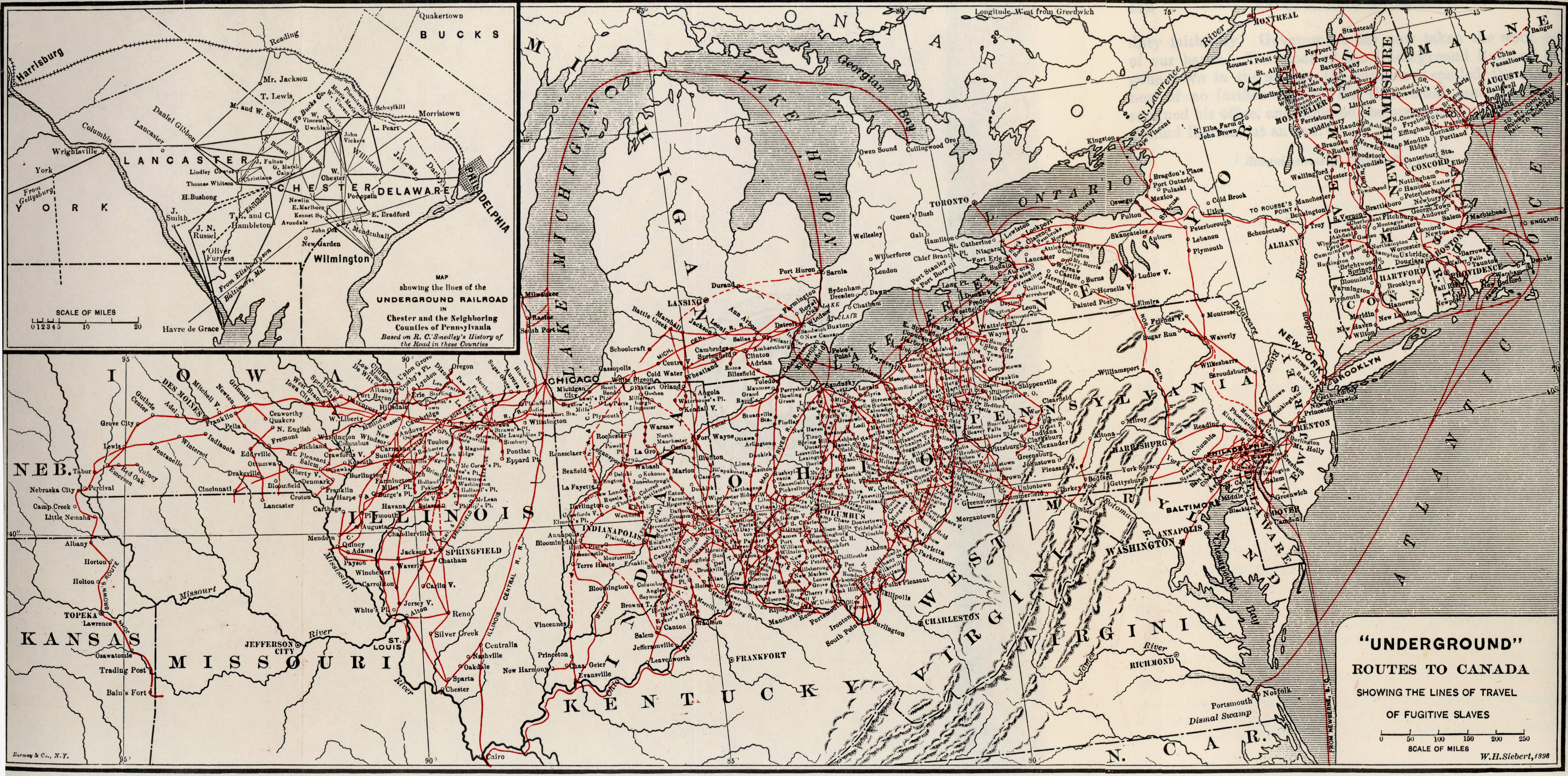
Underground Railroad map

The Underground Railroad in Harrisburg, Pennsylvania was a critical hub of the American Underground Railroad network, which helped men, women and children to escape the system of chattel slavery that existed in the United States during the nineteenth century.

This UGRR hub was successful largely because there was a significant population of free Black men and women in the Harrisburg area who were able to help runaways reach and traverse the many UGRR routes that were located throughout the region.

== Background ==
Harrisburg was an inviting place to settle because there were opportunities for employment here that were not available elsewhere. In addition, the community's long history of diversity made it possible for individuals fleeing enslavement to become part of an African American community in which they were free to socialize, marry and educate their children. A school was established here for Black children by Thomas Dorsey.

As a result, African Americans made their way to Harrisburg from farms in and around Dauphin County, Pennsylvania and from Virginia and Maryland. Some were individuals who had been born into free Black families while some escaped enslavement on plantations. Others were freed by manumission.

Beginning in 1817, churches and schools were established in the area by Black men and women, sometimes with financial help from white residents. By 1820, however, some city residents began looking for ways to institute greater control over the growing free Black population in the region. Proposals were initiated that would have required free Black men, women and children to register with the city and a citizens' patrol was formed to monitor and harass people of color. Agitation also increased in area newspapers.

In January 1836, the first Anti-Slavery Society of Harrisburg was formed by John Winebrenner. A year later, in 1837, the Pennsylvania Anti-Slavery Society was established in Philadelphia. Delegates subsequently traveled from Harrisburg to Philadelphia to participate in anti-slavery conventions. Frederick Douglass and William Lloyd Garrison were invited to Harrisburg to speak in front of the courthouse. The American Colonization Society auxiliary was also formed. Its goal was to promote the emigration of formerly enslaved Black men, women and children to Africa.

Despite the rising tension, there were nine hundred free Black men, women and children living in the Harrisburg area by 1850; by 1860, the population had grown to roughly 1800.

=== A key hub ===
Harrisburg became a key hub of the UGRR because it was close to the Mason–Dixon line which separated the slave states from the free states. Over time, multiple UGRR routes were established to connect the city to other key hubs within Pennsylvania and beyond. Roads, canals, ferries and a robust railroad system made it easy to move people to and through the area on routes north to New York or east to Lancaster and Philadelphia. Harrisburg also became an important hub because of the number of free Black residents in the area who were able to help Black men, women and children resettle after escaping their captors in America's Deep South.

=== Aid ===
Shelter was found in homes of free African Americans, including the house of schoolteacher Joseph Bustill and physician William Jones. Tanner's Alley, at Walnut and Commonwealth streets, became a center of Underground Railroad activity, as did the Wesley Union African Methodist Episcopal Zion Church, which was a station on the UGRR.

=== Danger ===
Involvement with the Underground Railroad was inherently dangerous, however, because Harrisburg was located near the border between the slave and free states. As a result, all African Americans were at risk of abduction by "slave catchers," even those who had been born into freedom and had never been enslaved.

The Fugitive Slave Act of 1850 was a root cause of this danger because it allowed slave catchers to legally enter free states, where they were then empowered to obtain assistance from law enforcement in abducting Black men, women and children and transporting them south for new periods of enslavement, regardless of how long and how settled they had been in a free state. Within the first thirty months of the Fugitive Slave Law's enactment, officials in Harrisburg "vigorously" executed the law. Slave catchers succeeded because it was difficult for Black people to prove that they were free, even if they had been born into freedom.

As a result, reports of these types of abductions increased in newspapers after 1850. Among those reported incidents was the court case of Francis Jackson, Francis Johnson v. John W. Deshazer. Jackson, a free man from New Castle, Pennsylvania, had been sold into slavery after being abducted and transported across state lines.

By mid-1853, however, the tide was turning in favor of the anti-slavery movement as residents across Pennsylvania ramped up pressure to stop the abductions. Notably, Harrisburg area residents chose to vote out three of their four elected constables for serving as slave-runners. Community pressure also prompted the federal commissioner to resign.

== Anti-slavery community ==
Early on in Harrisburg's history, a significant number of its residents identified as abolitionists. In 1837, the city was the site of a statewide antislavery convention.

When the Fugitive Slave Act was adopted, multiple lawyers stepped forward to represent those who were charged as fugitive slaves. Many offered their counsel pro bono; others received funding from resident abolitionists and Black community leaders.

== Notable people ==
- Joseph Cassey Bustill
- Harriet McClintock Marshall and her husband Elisha Marshall
- Judy Richards, a Black community leader whose neighborhood between Third & Mulberry Streets was known as "Judytown" and was a center of UGRR activity
- J. Howard Wert
