= John E. Price =

American minister (1823–1906)

Rev. John E. Price (February 2, 1823 – February 9, 1906) was an elder and minister of the African Methodist Episcopal Zion Church (AME Zion Church). He was a minister for around 50 years. He was the founder and president of the Garnet Equal Rights League at Harrisburg. He wrote hymns and was an editor for the Zion Church Advocate and, with William H. Day, the Zion Church Herald and Outlook, the first paper of the AME Zion Church. Day was a minister, abolitionist, and educator.

== Personal life ==
John Edward Price was born on February 2, 1823. (Note: His date of birth is February 2, 1823, based upon being 83 years and 7 days old at the time of his death on February 9, 1906.) His father, John, and his mother were born in Pennsylvania. At five years of age, he moved to Harrisburg, Pennsylvania. He worked as a hod carrier for several years with Singleton T. Jones, who became a bishop of the AME Zion Church. He registered for the draft in June 1863, when he was 40 years of age. He lived in Harrisburg and identified himself as a shoemaker. He and his wife had at least six children: John D. Price, Marian Price, William Price, Sumner F. Price, Harriet Virginia Price, and George T. Price.

He moved to Philadelphia at retirement around 1896 to be live with his daughters. His wife, Mary K. Price, died on November 11, 1898, of Bright's disease. She died at their house in Shippensburg. He died on February 9, 1906. He died at his house in Philadelphia, Pennsylvania. He was survived by three relatives: Mrs. Mary Sigler, Mrs. M. Fisher, and Mrs. Mary Spotwood. He and his wife were buried at a lot he held in Harrisburg at the Lincoln Cemetery, (Note: His gravestone states that his date of death is February 11, 1909, but his probate records were first filed on November 12, 1906 and show that he died in February 1906. The 1909 year looks to be one of the dates of the probated estate, which was still processed in 1908 and had five years to sell land in Harrisburg.) which was established by the Wesley Union A.M.E. Zion Church in 1827. Also buried at the cemetery is William H. Day.

== Career ==
=== Minister ===
Price was a minister of the African Methodist Episcopal Zion Church (AME Zion Church). By 1865, he was the pastor of the Wesley Union African Methodist Episcopal Zion Church. In 1866, he was a minister in Dauphin County, Pennsylvania, and represented the Good Samaritan Council of Harrisburg at the annual conference. In July 1876, Price and Rev. John Bosley led AME Zion Church meetings for Philadelphia and Allegheny Churches at Grove Station, Castle Shannon. At that time, Price was the pastor of the Mission Church in Allegheny City. He was a pastor of the St. James' Methodist Episcopal Church in New Jersey from 1880 to 1882. In 1881, he was elder and musical director of the AME Zion Church in York, Pennsylvania. In 1884, he was appointed to head the Shippensburg church and provide oversight of the Newville church. He was the pastor of the West Street AME Zion Church in Carlisle, Pennsylvania, in 1888. He held a rally that year with William H. Day and other ministers speaking at the church. A resolution was passed by his congregation commending his service with the church in 1888. Price was the preceding elder of the Philadelphia District and the pastor of the Wesley AME Zion Church in Philadelphia in 1893.

He was the assistant secretary of annual conferences. His areas of interests at the A.M.E. Zion Church conferences included book concern, journal, holy orders, complaints, missions, and railroad accommodations. He was appointed missionary agent in 1886.

=== Reconstruction ===
He founded and was president of the Garnet Equal Rights League at Harrisburg, which held lectures about equal rights for African Americans. It was established in September 1865 as an auxiliary to the Pennsylvania State Equal Rights League. It ceased operations in August 1866, as dictated by the State League. He attended the Pennsylvania Equal Rights Convention of 1866, where he was on the Credential Committee.

==== Education ====
Price and two others—Rev. Henry Highland Garnet and O.L.C Hughes, a professor—led a meeting for Freedmen in August 1867. The purpose of the meeting was to discuss education and for the "moral and mental elevation of the freedmen." Garnet was a minister for the Shiloh Presbyterian Church in New York City. Hughes was the Superintendent of Garnet League Freedmen schools in Tennessee.

In 1879, he helped plan for the Zion Hill Collegiate Institute and spoke about the importance of education. Price, the secretary of the church's board of education, with William H. Day and Rev. M. M. Bell, established the Junior Biblical Institute. Day was its first instructor. It opened on February 23, 1885.

=== Writer and editor ===
He wrote at least 15 hymns. He edited the first paper of the AME Zion Church, the Zion Church Herald and Outlook, with William H. Day. With Rev. Jacob P. Hamer, he edited the Zion Church Advocate, which was acquired by the AME Zion Church and it stopped publishing by 1876. He was on the Board of Book Concern in 1876, when the Zion Church Advocate was declared in debt. It was published in Washington, D.C. He was identified as one of the noteworthy authors for the AME Zion Church in 1896.

He retired around 1896, when he was identified as Rev. Dr. John E. Price.
