= Singleton T. Jones =

African Methodist religious leader (1825–1891)

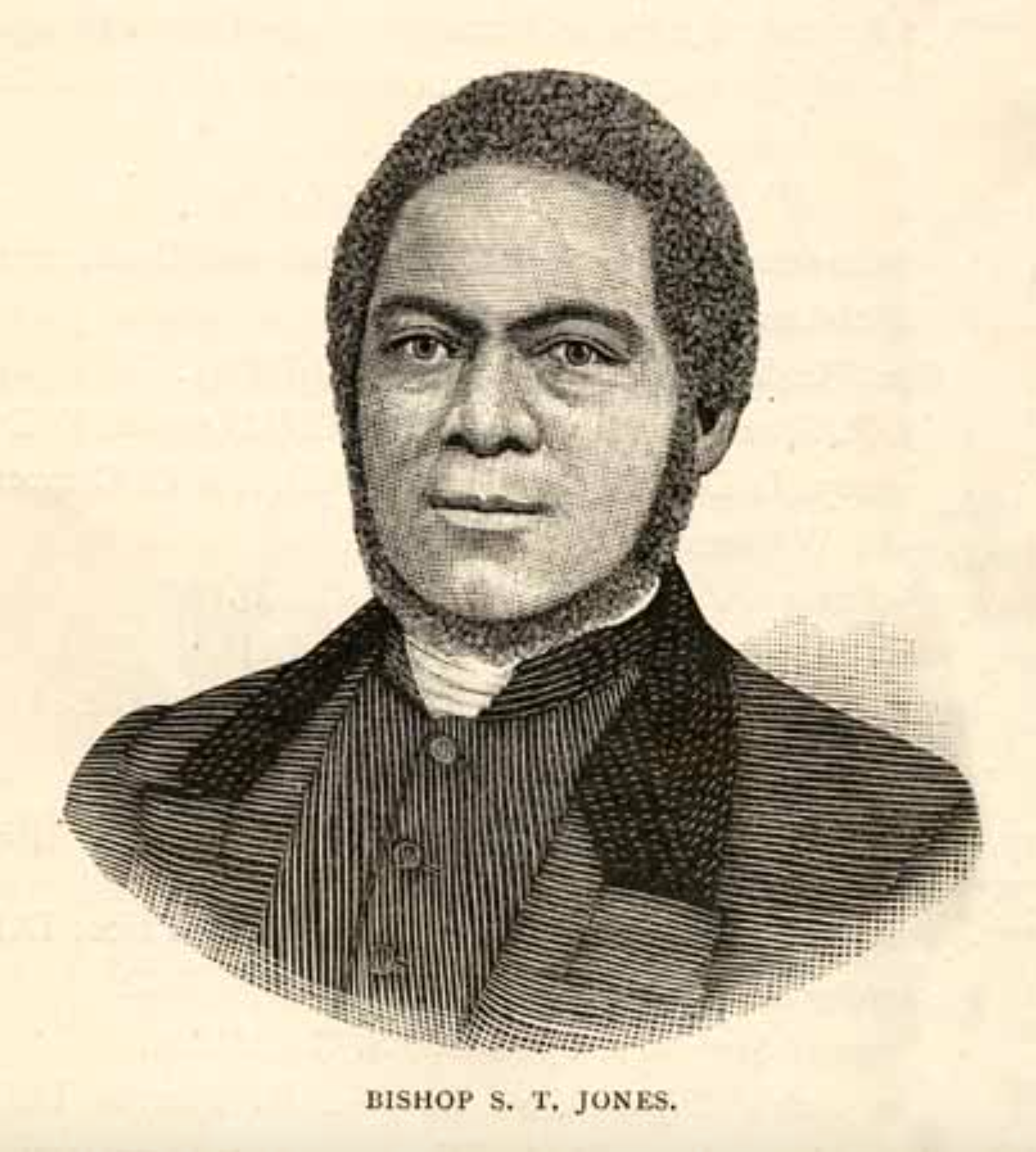
Bishop Singleton T. Jones of the African Methodist Episcopal Zion Church

Bishop Singleton T. Jones (March 8, 1825 – April 18, 1891) was a religious leader in the African Methodist Episcopal Zion Church (AME Zion). Although he had little education, Jones taught himself to be an articulate orator and was awarded the position of bishop within the church . Besides being a pastor to churches, he also edited AME Zion publications, the Zion's Standard and Weekly Review and the Discipline.

Jones helped establish churches before and after the Civil War and was known for his skills for helping blacks adjust to the post-war Reconstruction era. He wrote several hymns and his sermons and addresses were published a year after his death.

He was the first of the African American clergy to be awarded an honorary Doctor of Divinity and was listed with Harriet Tubman as one of the most effective church members to understand and meet the needs of African Americans.

== Early life ==
Singleton Thomas Webster Jones was born in Wrightsville, Pennsylvania, on March 8, 1825. His parents were William H. and Catherine Jones from the Eastern Shore of Maryland. Catherine was born in Liberty, Maryland.

Jones was apprenticed to a lawyer, Thomas Kelly, in York, Pennsylvania at the age of ten. He worked on the farm, in the house, and as a cart boy until 1839, when he was released from the service. He then left for Philadelphia to find work but was unsuccessful. He continued on foot to Harrisburg where he found employment at the Temperance House Inn. Jones attended the Wesley Union AME Zion Church, led by Rev. George Galbreath, who had baptized him when he was two years old. He worked as a hod carrier with Rev. John E. Price in Harrisburg. He also worked on a boat on the Ohio River.

== Career ==
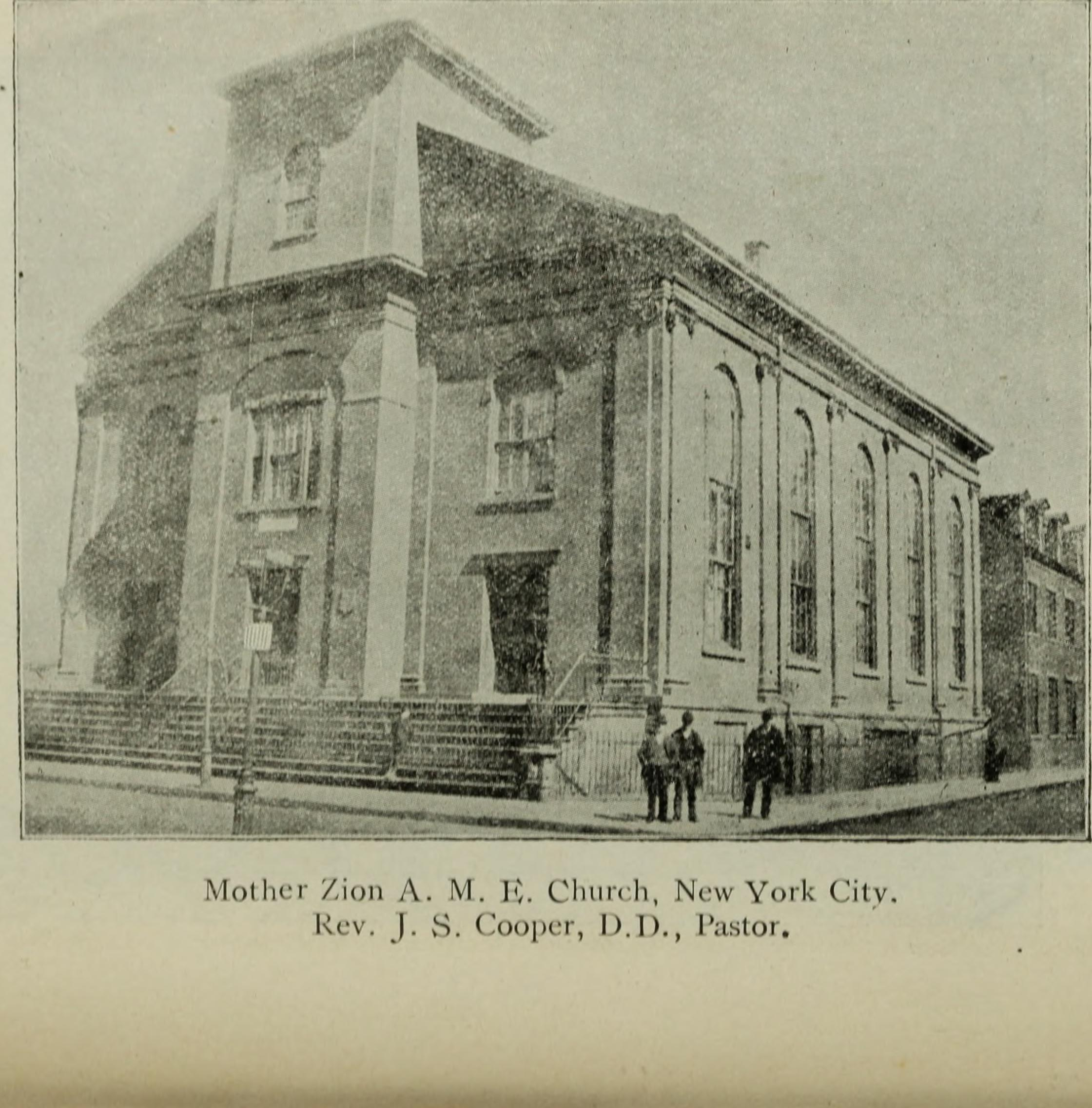
Mother African Methodist Episcopal Zion Church of New York City, 1902

=== Overview ===
Jones was licensed to preach in 1846. He joined the Allegheny Conference on August 23, 1849. He was ordained deacon in August 1850. In 1851, he received elders' orders. He transferred to the Baltimore Conference in May 1853. In 1857 he was ordained elder by Bishop Galbreath. He served in the New York Conference in 1857, the Philadelphia Conference in 1859, the New York Conference in 1864, returning to the Baltimore Conference in June 1866.

On May 19, 1868, Jones was elected bishop May 19, 1868, and was consecrated May 31. He last served the Mother African Methodist Episcopal Zion Church (Old Zion church) in New York. He was the first African American to receive an honorary Doctor of Divinity from a reputable college.

=== Churches ===
His sermons are brilliant with unmeasured poetry, and abound in wit, invective, glowing rhetoric, and logic… No one sleeps under the preaching of Bishop Jones, for he has long been considered the most eloquent man in his denomination.

— William Wells Brown, The Rising Son, Or, The Antecedents and Advancement of the Colored Race

Jones served churches throughout Pennsylvania, Baltimore, Washington, and New Jersey. Jones was the pastor of the Zion Wesley A.M.E. Zion Church in Southwest Washington, D.C., by 1843. He established a mission, for what in nine years became the Galbraith African Methodist Episcopal Zion Church, in northwest Washington in 1843.

After the Civil War, church leaders traveled into the southern states to spread the word to African Americans about the black-led African Methodist Episcopal Zion Church. Jones went into the southwest. Jones was noted for his ability to help his Harrisburg congregants manage the post-war challenges:

The keen desire for education, the awareness of self-effort and heartbreaking attempts to forge the race into strong souls of industry, found the Church spending long hours at prayer and study and communion, and with these, work, hard work.

— David Henry Bradley, A history of the A.M.E. Zion Church

He, with Harriet Tubman were identified as two people from the Church who best understood the needs of African Americans and offered wholesome and worthwhile contributions. Jones was the Presiding Bishop of the Missouri Conference when the Jones Tabernacle African Methodist Episcopal Zion Church in Indianapolis, Indiana was named after him in 1872. The church was subsequently destroyed by fire. A historical marker indicates the location of the former church at North and Blackford Streets.

=== Editor ===
Jones was a founder and the editor of the Zion's Standard and Weekly Review, the second newspaper published by the Zion Church, which was a "pioneer in the movement for abolition of human slavery." At the time, he was the pastor of the Bleecker Street church and before he became a bishop. In the late 1850s, William H. Day contributed poems and was an editor for the newspaper. Jones was tasked to begin editing the Discipline in 1856.

=== Works ===
- Jones, Singleton Thomas (1892). Sermons and Addresses of the Late Rev. Bishop Singleton T. Jones of the African M.E. Zion Church: With a Memoir of His Life and Character. P. Anstadt.
- Jones, Singleton T.; Butcher, Charles Simpson; Hunt & Eaton; African Methodist Episcopal Zion Church. (c. 1890). Hand-book of the discipline of the African Methodist Episcopal Zion Church. New York: Printed by Hunt and Eaton.

== Personal life ==
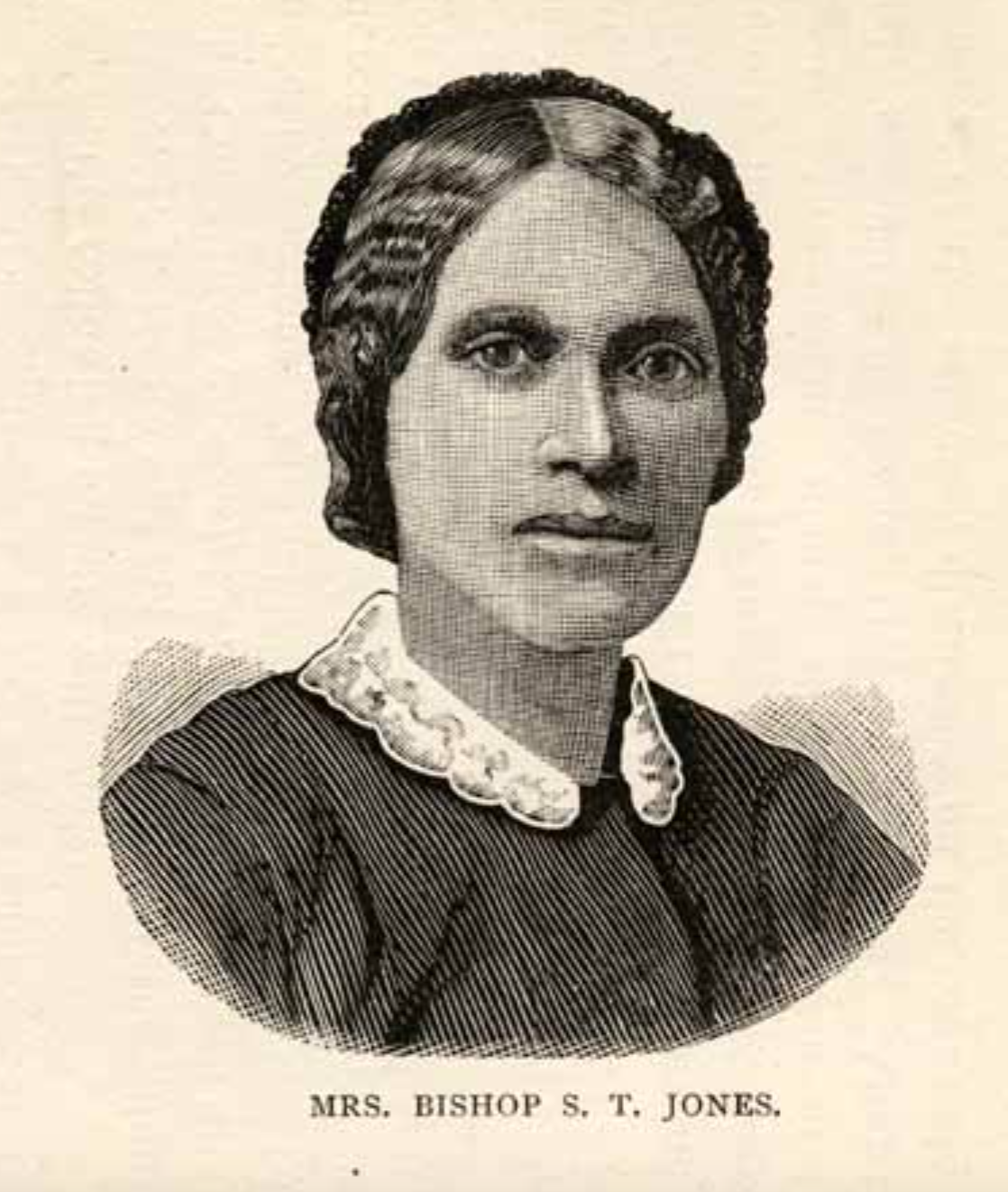
Mrs. Bishop S. T. Jones (Mary J. Talbot Jones)

On November 29, 1846, Jones married Mary J. Talbot, or Talbert, of Allegheny, Pennsylvania. Her parents were Edward and Jane Talbert. Their children were George Galbreth, Chester Stevens, Ann Catherine, David Eddie, Elizabeth Jane, Mary Ann, Singleton Thomas, William Haywodd Bishop, Alice Williamson, Joll Robinson, Jennie Catherine, and Edward Derussa William Jones. Both Jennie and Edward graduated from Livingstone College. His son, Edward D. W. Jones (1871–1935) was a bishop of the John Wesley AMEZ Church. In addition to serving as clergy, Edward was also editor of Comprehensive Catechism.

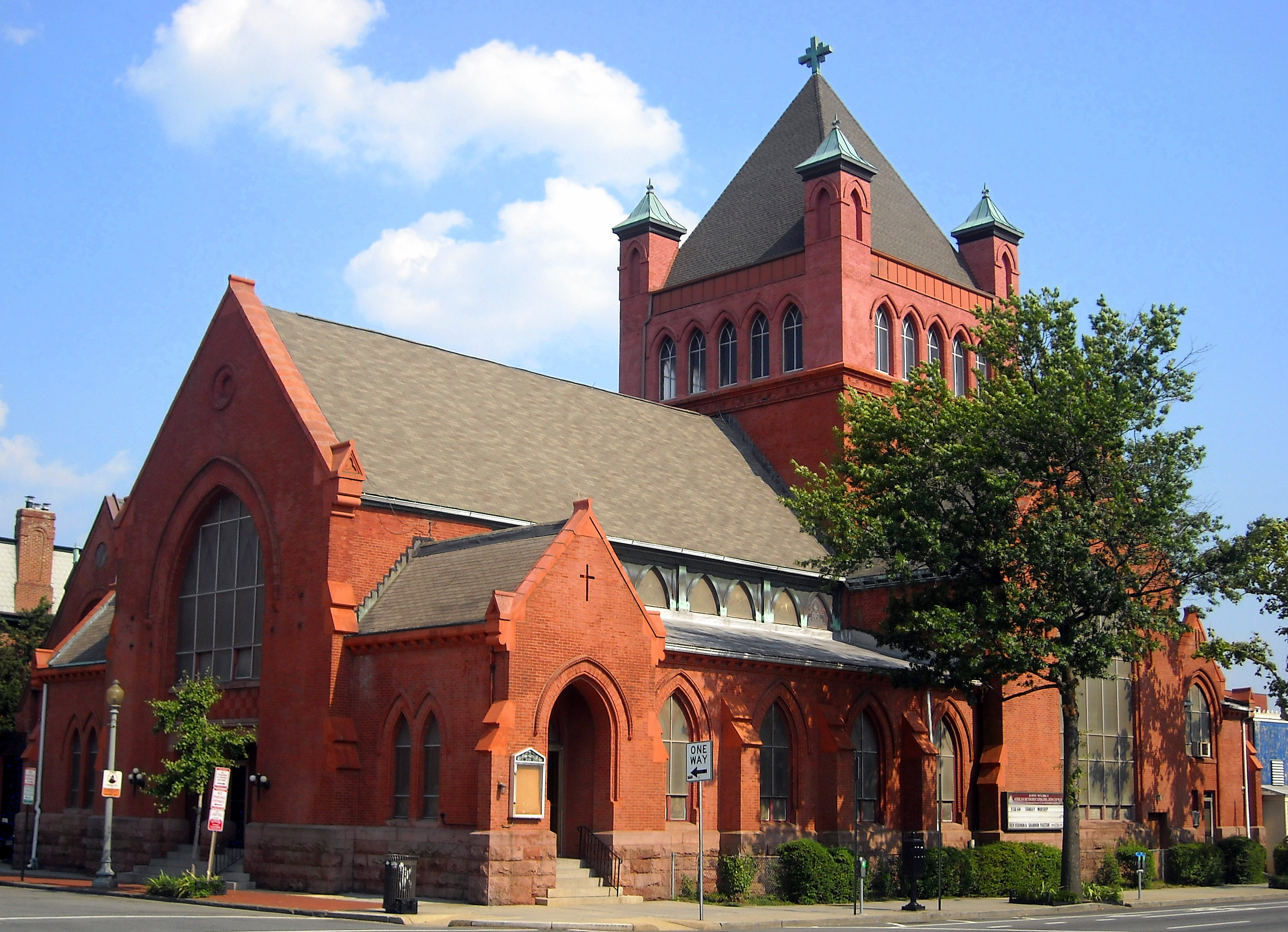
John Wesley AME Zion Church (est. 1847), located in the Logan Circle neighborhood of Washington, D.C.

Jones was an accomplished organist. He died at 1019 19th Street N.W. in Washington, D.C., on April 18, 1891. He was still in active service at the time of his death. His funeral was held at the John Wesley Church, now the National Church of Zion Methodism. His wife, Mary J. Jones, died in Washington, D.C., on July 14, 1895. She was said to have been a prominent member of the church.
