= Lucy Stanton (abolitionist) =

African-American activist (1831–1910)

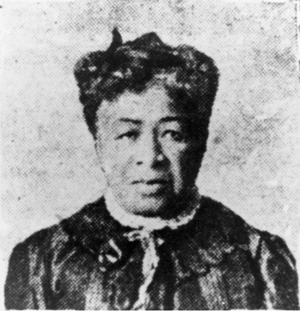
- Stanton c. 1910
- Born: October 16, 1831; Ohio, US
- Died: February 18, 1910 (aged 78); Los Angeles, California, US
- Burial place: Angelus-Rosedale Cemetery, Los Angeles
- Occupation: Abolitionist
- Known for: Being the first African-American woman to complete a four-year course of study at a college or university
- Spouses: William H. Day (m. 1852; div. 1872); Levi Sessions (m. 1878)

Lucy Stanton Day Sessions (October 16, 1831 – February 18, 1910) was an American abolitionist and feminist figure, notable for being the first African-American woman to complete a four-year course of a study at a college or university. She completed a Ladies Literary Course from Oberlin College in 1850.

Day's life was a testament to the many strong, resilient, and radical women that participated in the first wave of American feminism. Her passionate commitment to abolition especially connected her to her radical female predecessors, such as Angelina E. Grimké, who, as early as 1836, linked the abolition of slavery to the Christian duty of women.

== Early life ==
Lucy Stanton was born free, the only child of Margaret and Samuel Stanton, on October 16, 1831. When her biological father Samuel, a barber, died when she was only 18 months old, Stanton's mother married John Brown, an abolitionist famous around Cleveland, Ohio, for his participation in the Underground Railroad. Stanton is noted as saying that John Brown would harbor as many as 13 runaway slaves in their house at any given time.

== Education ==
In her youth, Stanton attended the Cleveland Free School, which was founded by John Brown and John Malvin for the education of African-American children. The exact dates of Stanton's enrollment at the school as seen from available records is not yet clear.

In 1846, Stanton enrolled in Oberlin College, completing a Literary degree in the "Ladies' Literary Course" of study in 1849. This degree differed from the B.A. offered to men in that it did not require foreign languages or higher mathematics. At Oberlin College, Stanton was very active in the Ladies' Literary Society and even became the first Black president of the Ladies' Literary Society. When she graduated from Oberlin, she was the first Black woman to receive a college degree.She was invited (and presented) a speech at her graduation entitled "A Plea for the Oppressed" which expressed her abolitionist sentiments. This speech, in response to the Fugitive Slave Act of 1850 which was about to take effect, urged the audience, particularly women, to put themselves in the place of the enslaved, to join the abolitionist cause, and to ultimately end slavery in the United States. Her speech was immensely well-received, and reprinted in publications like The Oberlin Evangelist, the Oberlin College school newspaper, and "The Condition, Elevation, Emigration, and Destiny of the Colored People of the United States Politically Considered".

== Personal life and activism ==
Fresh out of school, Lucy Stanton moved to Columbus, Ohio, where she got a job at a newly developed public school teaching black children.From there, Lucy began working as a principal at another free school in Cleveland. On November 25, 1852, Stanton married William H. Day, also an Oberlin College graduate. Stanton worked as a librarian and assisted her husband as editor for the first of Cleveland's African-American newspapers, The Aliened American. In the first issue dated, April 9, 1853, Stanton became the first African-American woman to publish a work of fiction entitled "Charles and Clara Hays. She was a member of the Chatham Vigilance Committee which was organized to prevent people from being sold or returned to slavery.

Stanton and Day had a daughter, Florence Day, born in 1858. Shortly after her birth, Day abandoned his wife and child, leaving for England. Stanton successfully received a divorce from Day in 1872. Following Day's abandonment, Stanton worked as a seamstress in Cleveland while continuing her activism. The divorce however would have repercussions for Stanton. In 1864, correspondence between two supporters of Stanton would indicate that she was denied acceptance into a missionary program aimed to help freed African Americans in the south because of her status as an independent parent. At the time, this status paired with her race was seen as taboo. After this debacle, she ended up joining a different group for the same type of work at the Cleveland Freedmen's Aid Society. Her affiliation with them led to her being sent first to Georgia in 1866 and then to Mississippi, both to teach newly freed slaves. While in Mississippi, Stanton met, and then in 1878 married, Levi Sessions. The couple moved to Tennessee where Stanton continued to be a supporter of women's and African Americans' rights by working with organizations such as the Women's Relief Corps, the Order of Eastern Star, the Women's Christian Temperance Union, and the African Methodist Episcopal Church.

After the death of her mother in 1900, Stanton moved to Los Angeles. In 1904, with the assistance of black church and club women, she established the Sojourner Truth Industrial Club as a "safe refuge" for the hundreds of black working women migrating to the city. The club sought to promote the guidance and development of young African-American women. Stanton died in Los Angeles, California, on February 18, 1910, at the age of 78 and was buried in Angelus-Rosedale Cemetery.
