= Harriet Marshall =

Harriet Marshall may refer to:

- Harriet McClintock Marshall, conductor on the Underground Railroad
- Harriet Gibbs Marshall, American pianist, writer, and music educator
