= Harriet McClintock Marshall =

Underground Railroad conductor (1840–1925)

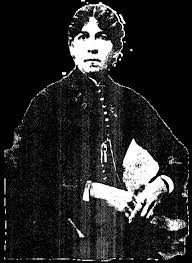
- Harriet McClintock Marshall in an undated photo
- Born: Harriet McClintock; August 14, 1840; Harrisburg, Pennsylvania
- Died: July 25, 1925 (aged 84); Harrisburg, Pennsylvania
- Occupation: Conductor on the Underground Railroad
- Spouse: Elisha Marshall
- Parent(s): Henry McClintock and Catherine (Yellets) McClintock

Harriet McClintock Marshall (August 14, 1840–July 25, 1925) was a conductor on the Underground Railroad whose home in Harrisburg, Pennsylvania served as a stop or safe house for the clandestine network, along with the Wesley Union African Methodist Episcopal Zion Church (AME Zion Church) and other homes in the city. She offered shelter, food, and clothing to people escaping slavery.

Her husband Elisha Marshall, a formerly enslaved man and veteran of the American Civil War, was also active in helping people reach freedom, often providing transportation. They also collaborated on the creation of a monument to the United States Colored Troops, which is located in Lincoln Cemetery in Harrisburg, where she and her husband were later interred.

== Early life ==
Born in Harrisburg, Pennsylvania on August 14, 1840, as Harriet McClintock, Harriet McClintock Marshall was a daughter of Henry McClintock and Catherine (Yellets) McClintock, a native of Highspire, Pennsylvania who was born circa 1802 or 1803, who was of German and African American ancestry, and who identified as both "White German" and "Mulatto." Catherine McClintock was also a founder of the Wesley Union African Methodist Episcopal Zion Church.

The sister of Catherine "Kate" McClintock White, Harriet McClintock Marshall was also the half-sister of Mariah Williams Powell and Elizabeth Williams Kelly, through her mother's first marriage to James Williams.

Marshall attended the German School, and became a teacher. In addition, she was employed as a domestic worker for the Eby family in Harrisburg. Marshall and her mother were active on the Underground Railroad.

== Marriage and children ==
Marshall met Elisha Marshall as he made his way north on the Underground Railroad. They were married in 1864. Their son Rev. Dr. William H. Marshall (1865–1916) was a teacher, principal and an A.M.E. Zion Church pastor. Daughter Harriet "Ella" married Morris H. Layton.

Both Harriet and Elisha worked for the Eby family.

== Underground Railroad ==
Marshall was a member of the Wesley Union African Methodist Episcopal Zion Church, which was a station that offered shelter, food, and clothing to people escaping slavery. She and her husband Elisha Marshall (1838–1903), who freed himself, lived in Harrisburg, Pennsylvania. (Note: His name was also spelled Elijah.)

Both Marshall and her husband were active members of the Underground Railroad. Elisha helped transport the men, women and children who were escaping slavery to the church at Third and Mulberry streets. Their house at Calder and Front streets was used as a stopping place during the transport process; while waiting there, the newly freed individuals were able to rest and receive food and other forms of assistance.

Mary and Dr. William M. Jones were also active in Harrisburg's Underground Railroad. They lived in Tanner's Alley and were also members of the Wesley Union church.

== Civil War ==
During the American Civil War, Elisha Marshall enrolled with the Union Army as a member of the 24th United States Colored Infantry Regiment. He was a member of Company D of the regiment and was mustered into service on February 15, 1865 at Camp William Penn in Philadelphia. Between May 5 and June 1, the 24th USCT was stationed in Washington, D.C. before moving to Camp Casey in Virginia, which was located just outside of the capital. (Note: Camp Casey, any of several Union Army training camps named for Major General Silas Casey including where "colored" troops trained) The regiment was assigned to guard Confederate prisoners at Point Lookout, Maryland until July 16, when the regiment was moved to Roanoke, Virginia, where its members distributed supplies and preserved order through September.

During the 24th USCT's tenure of service, Marshall's husband, Elisha, was promoted to the rank of corporal. Subsequently ordered to Richmond, Virginia, the regiment was officially mustered out on October 1, 1865.

A monument to African American Civil War veterans that Marshall and her husband helped plan and build was later erected in the Lincoln Cemetery in Harrisburg.

== Death ==
Marshall died in Harrisburg on July 25, 1925 and was buried at the Lincoln Cemetery in the city's Penbrook section.

== Legacy ==
Marshall was depicted in a mural of notable African Americans from Harrisburg. Cesar Viveros designed the mural, which is located at The Jackson House Hotel.
