= St. David African Methodist Episcopal Zion Cemetery =

Church cemetery in Suffolk County, New York

Coordinates: 40°59′42″N 72°17′8″W

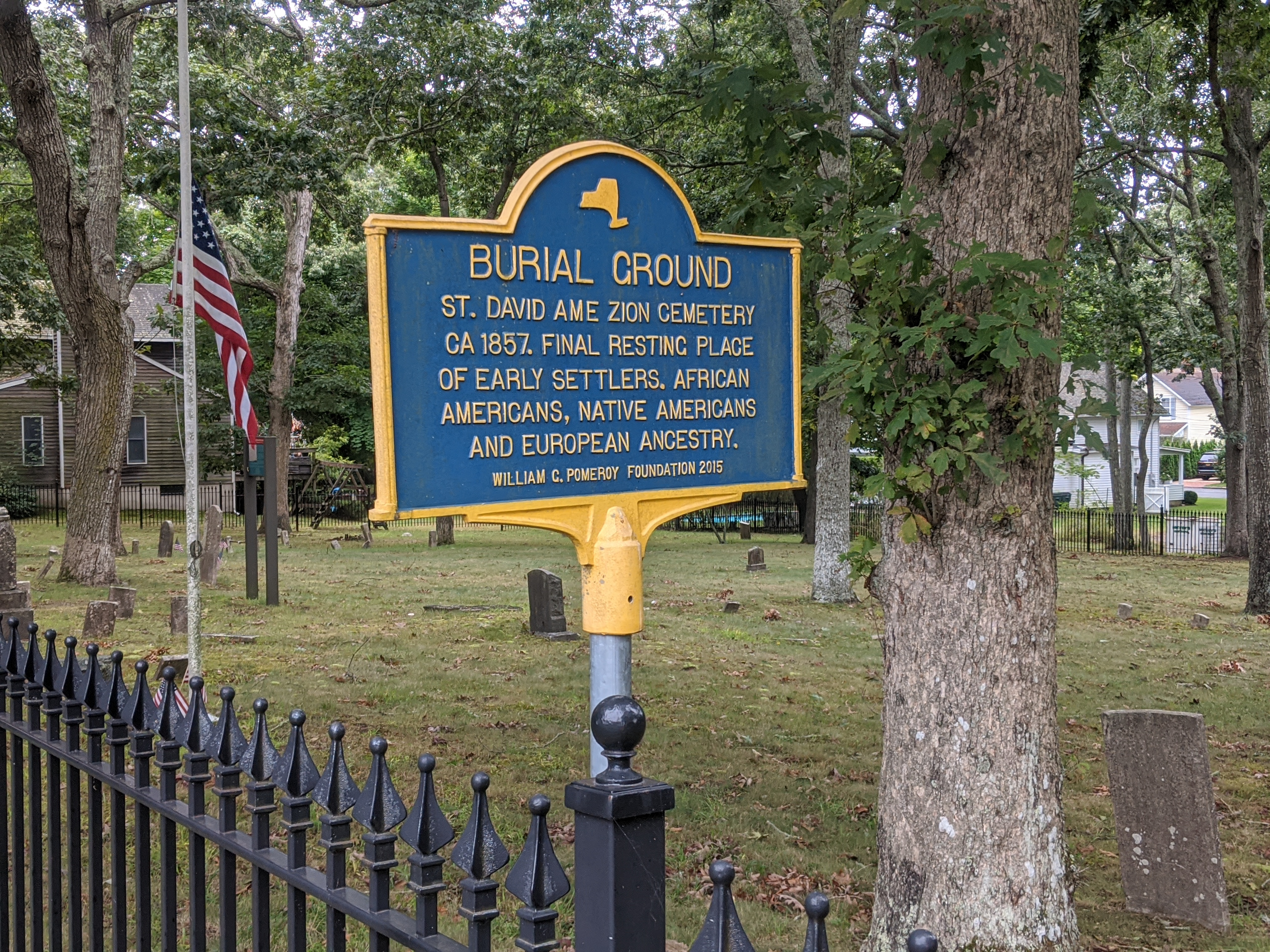
- African American, Irish and Native American burial ground
- Interactive map of St. David African Methodist Episcopal Zion Cemetery

Details
- Location: Sag Harbor, New York
- No. of graves: About 100

St. David African Methodist Episcopal Zion Cemetery is a historic cemetery located in the Eastville community of Sag Harbor, New York. It is anchored by the AME church, the Eastville Historical Society House on NY 114 and the St. David Cemetery. The site has around 100 graves, including that of Reverend J. P. Thompson, the first pastor of the St. David AME Zion Church.

== Early history ==
The Eastville community, a mixed diaspora of Irish, Native American and African-American workers, was established during the 1830s, coinciding with the boom times of Sag Harbor whaling. Formerly known as Snooksville (named after the Irish Snooks-Hicks family), the community was renamed Eastville for its location east of the village. The original location of the AME church still stands to this day. It was constructed in 1839 by African Americans and Native Americans on Eastville Avenue and is believed to have been a stop on the Underground Railroad. Rev. J. P. Thompson, was an abolitionist and confidante of orator Frederick Douglass. The Eastville Community Historical Society of Sag Harbor (founded 1981) also owns, maintains and preserves the adjacent century-old cemetery in which African and Native Americans of the post-colonial St. David's church membership are buried, of whom many were Sag Harbor whalers. The community also had many Quakers who were sympathetic to the abolitionist cause.

In 1857, trustees Elymus Derby, Samuel Butler and David Hempstead of the AME Zion church purchased the land for a cemetery from Hannah and Anna Maria Solomon. It was used for burials until 1993.

== Archeological ==
Beginning in the early 1800s until the mid 1900s, the portion of the historic Sag Harbor district known as Eastville was home to a multi-ethnic population of free Blacks, European immigrants and Native Americans. The area had evolved due to a series of economic changes. There were two village fires, the rise and subsequent downfall of the whaling industry, the development of a factory industry, and the current boom in the tourism and summer resort business. Today Eastville retains its ethnic diversity, with some flight of African-Americans and influx of new residential homebuilders, a change that threatens the summer cottages built during the 1950s for a overbuilt esthetic of mega-mansions more suited for the economies of scale to match the Hamptons chic. In 2014 a historic marker was unveiled at the site of the cemetery, where students from the University of Minnesota used ground-penetrating radar and mapping to survey the cemetery on Eastville Avenue. The funds to conduct the surveys were awarded to the Eastville Community Historical Society (ECHS) by The Archaeological Institute of America (AIA) in 2013. The ECHS used the grant to support the preservation and community stewardship of the AME Cemetery, a heritage site that represented the working class community of African American, Irish immigrant and Native American residents in the 19th and early 20th centuries. The funds for the historic marker came from a grant from The William G. Pomerory Foundation, also the Huntington Arts Council and the Archaeological Institute of America.

== Heritage House ==
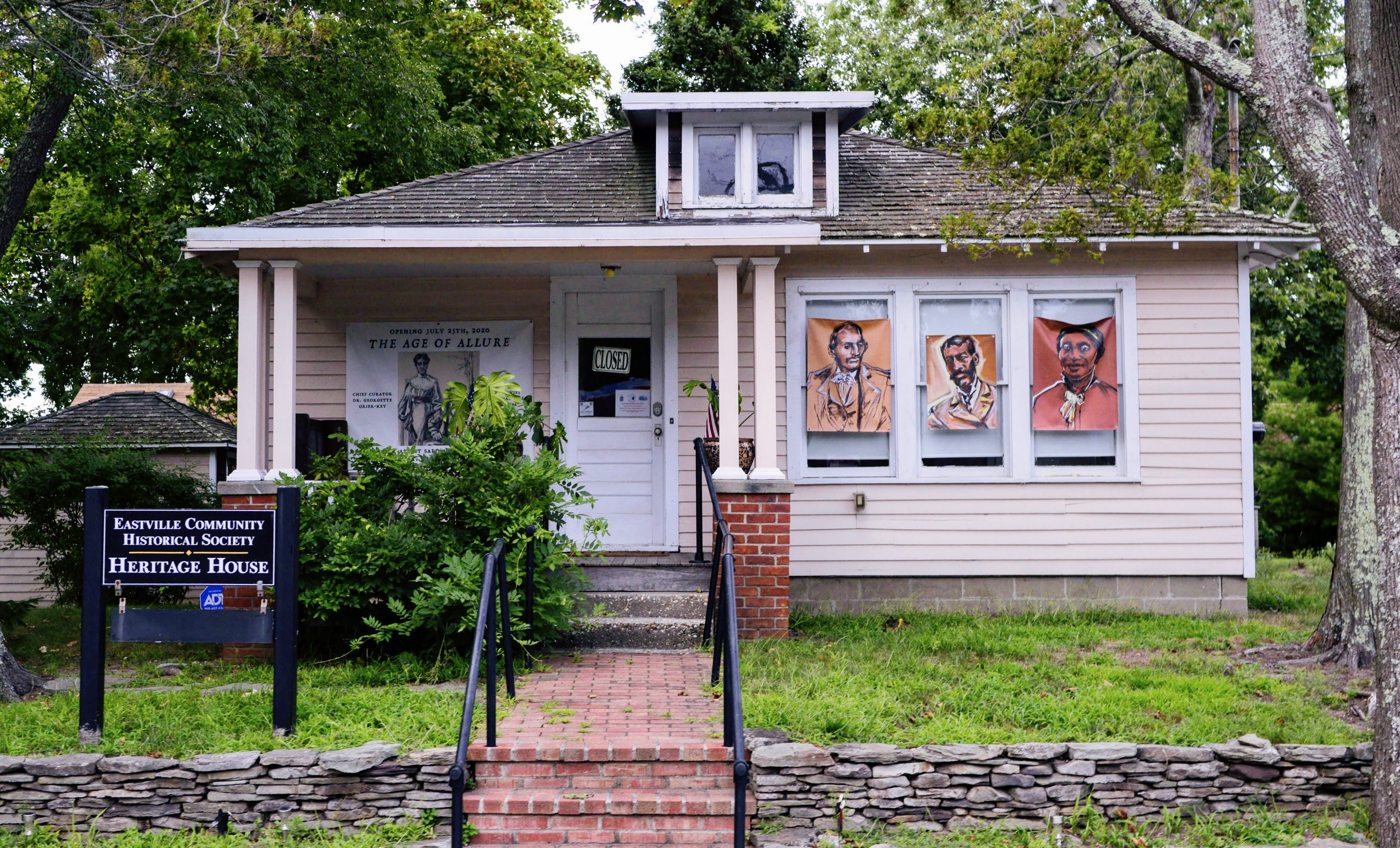
Eastville community in Sag Harbor

A 1925 house originally bought through a Sears & Roebuck catalog, Heritage House became the headquarters of the Eastville Community Historical Society at 139 Hampton Street in 1996, and today administers the affairs of the AME Cemetery. Since 1985 the society has kept the preservation of the Eastville community foremost, and was also instrumental in getting recognition of the adjacent Sag Harbor Hills, Azurest, and Ninevah Beach Subdivisions Historic District designation by the National Park Service.

== See also ==
- Lincoln Cemetery (Harrisburg, Pennsylvania)
- Mount Zion Cemetery (Kingston, New York)
- Black churches
- Religion of Black Americans
