= A.M.E. Zion Church of Kingston =

Historic site in Ulster County, New York

- Mount Zion Church and Cemetery
- U.S. National Register of Historic Places
- U.S. Historic district
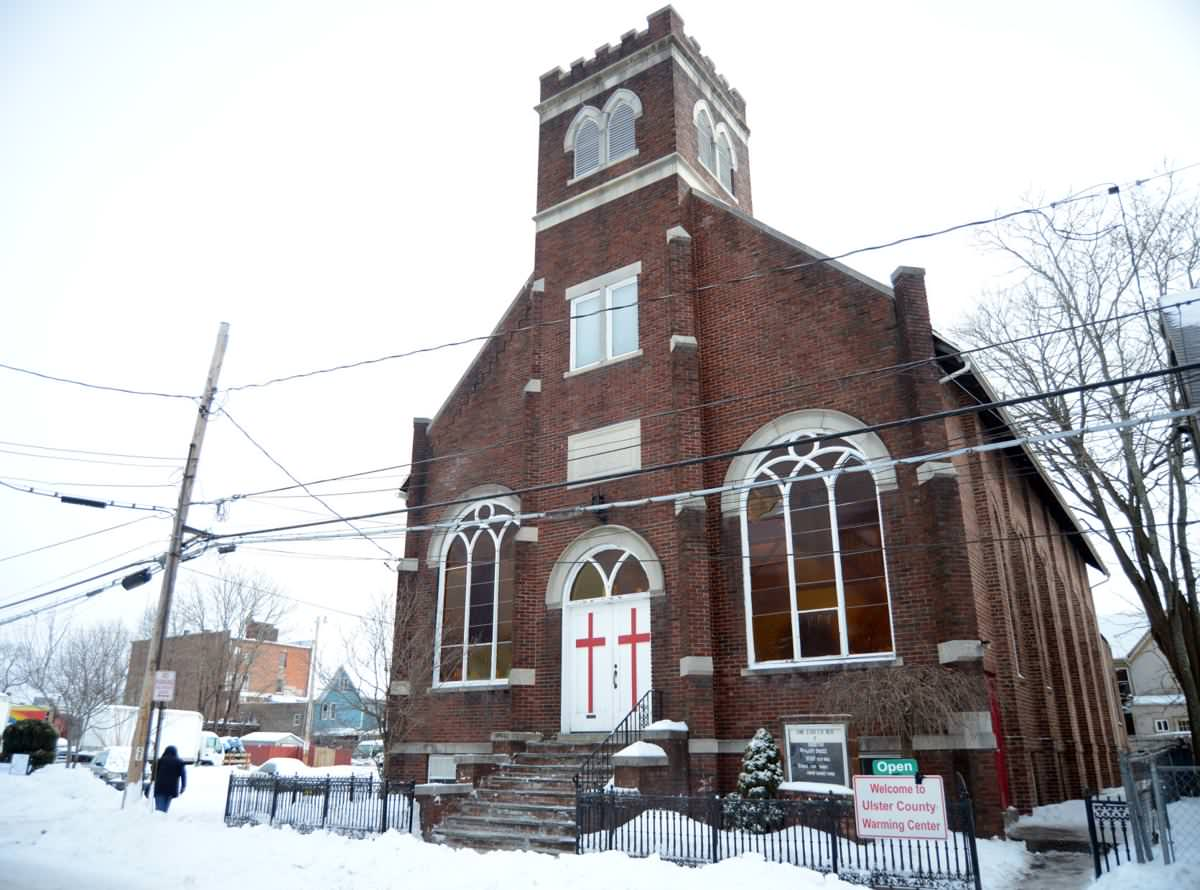
- A.M.E. Zion Church, c. 2019

- Location within New York Location within the United States
- Location: 26 Franklin St., Kingston, New York
- Coordinates: 41°55′48.5″N 74°0′31.5″W
- NRHP reference No.: 100006224
- Added to NRHP: March 3, 2021

The A.M.E. Zion Church of Kingston (previously known as Franklin Street AME Zion Church) is an African Methodist Episcopal Zion Church located in Kingston, New York. Founded in 1848, as a land grant from wealthy Black residents, Mrs. Sarah-Ann Hasbrouck and her husband, Alexander, it is the oldest continuous African-American congregation in Kingston and Ulster County. The church is located at 26 Franklin Street in the city's Fourth Ward.

== Building ==
The original church was constructed of wood (ca. 1848) at the junction of Union and Bowery Avenue (now Broadway and Franklin Street). Later the congregation moved to 26 Franklin Street and a new (wooden) church was built in 1863. The congregation worshiped in that building until it succumbed to fire in 1926. In 1927, a joint coalition of influential African-American and white community members rebuilt the church. The third church building was completed in 1929. Designed by Kingston architect Thomas P. Rice, who constructed several municipal buildings, the church was brick and stone in early-20th Century, neo-Gothic style.

The church is a three-bay-wide by seven-bay-deep, front-gabled brick building with a central square bell tower. The tower has four exposed paired faces with pointed-arched openings and louvers, At the top of the tower there is a cornice band and brick crenelation, giving it a distinctive, castle-like appearance. The bays flanking the front entrance each feature a large, rounded-arched window opening with Gothic-arched, tripartite lancets, yellow-colored stained-glass, all capped by a stone hood mold. The cornerstone (ca. 1927) is located near the base of the front, northwest corner of the church; Brick and concrete steps lead up to the main entrance positioned within the central tower bay. Above the entrance is a round-arched window with Gothic-arched tracery, capped by a stone hood mold and a stone inlay panel inscribed with the words, "A.M.E. Zion Church Est. 1848."

On March 3, 2021, the church building and associated Mount Zion Cemetery were added to the National Register of Historic Places.

== History ==
African-American history in the region was intrinsically tied to the agrarian economy. During the Colonial period, the economy depended on Slave Labor, and the Dutch West India thousands of Africans were transported to the area. Prosperous Dutch and French Huguenot farmers relied on African, Caribbean, South American, North American, and European trade networks for labor. As a result, many enslaved Africans and their descendants inherited Dutch, French Huguenot and British surnames. These surnames (i.e. Cantine, DuBois, Hasbrouck, Tenbrouck, Vandemark, Van Dyke, Vanderzee etc.) are present in church history and at the AMEZ's Mount Zion Cemetery (ca. 1856). The cemetery is located in Kingston's Fifth Ward, and contains more than 104 marked graves, many of which were African-American veterans and influential members of the community.

Later, the denomination was influential in abolitionist movement. Prominent members of the AME Zion was known as “the Freedom Church”, and the denomination included James Varick, Frederick Douglass, Harriet Tubman and Sojourner Truth (Isabella Baumfree), raised in neighboring Esopus.

== Notable people and contributions ==
Many former pastors were influential in local, state, and national affairs. Reverend Jeremiah R.B. Smith (served from 1882 to 1887) was a member of the Star of Zion, wrote for many anti-slavery publications, and was a former soldier. He was the first African-American chaplain of the Grand Army of the Republic (GAR). Also, Rev. Dr. Stephen Conrad was featured by Life Magazine in 1938 for being the first African-American president of Peekskill's Minister's Association. Later, during the Civil Rights Movement, several influential members (Everette C. Hodge and Leonard Van Dyke) were prominent local activists. Van Dyke was the city's first African-American alderman and represented the Fourth Ward.

In addition to religious services, the AME Zion Church of Kingston served as a meeting place for such clubs as the Boy Scouts, the Improved Benevolent and Protective Order of Elks of the World, Grand United Order of Odd Fellows in America, and National Association for the Advancement of Colored People (NAACP), and later the Maria Coles Perkins Lawton Progressive Women's Club. The latter was a division of Empire State Federation of Women's Clubs (ESFWC), established in 1908 by M.C. Perkins Lawton. The ESFWC was the organization that provided support for Harriet Tubman until her death in 1913.
