= Anna Bustill Smith =

African-American suffragist (1862–1945)

- Born: 1862; Philadelphia, Pennsylvania, US
- Died: August 1945 (aged 82–83); Philadelphia, Pennsylvania, US
- Occupations: Author and genealogist
- Known for: Documenting the history of the Bustill family
- Notable work: First known Black genealogist in the United States

Anna Bustill Smith (1862 – August 1945) was a cousin of Paul Robeson and member of Philadelphia's prominent Bustill family. A suffragist, who was the first known African-American genealogist in the United States, she also achieved recognition as an African-American author during the 20th century. Among her most important works are biographical sketches about members of the Bustill family, as well as her Reminiscences of Colored People of Princeton, N.J., 1800–1900, which was a study of Princeton's Black community that was published in 1913.

== Formative years ==
Born in Philadelphia, Pennsylvania, in 1862 as Anna Amelia Bustill, Anna Bustill Smith was a great-granddaughter of Cyrus Bustill (1732–1806), a formerly enslaved man who purchased his freedom and later became a founding member of Philadelphia's Free African Society, and was the daughter of Sarah Bustill (1828–1891) and her husband, Joseph Cassey Bustill (1822–1895), who had become the youngest member of the Underground Railroad when he was just seventeen years old.

In addition to being prominent members of the African-American community in the Philadelphia area, she and her parents were also members of the Quaker church. In 1880, she resided with her parents in Lower Oxford, Chester County, Pennsylvania.

== Later life and death ==
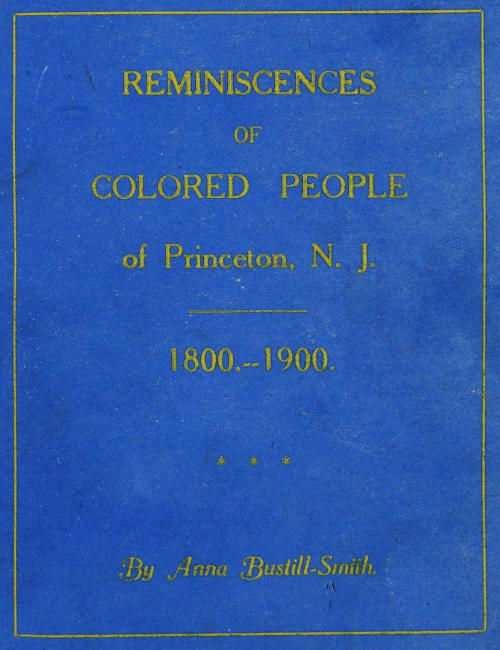
Front cover of Anna Bustill Smith's "Reminiscences of Colored People of Princeton, N.J., 1800–1900."

Anna Bustill Smith later married James H. Smith of Chicago, Illinois, and resided with him in Chicago before they relocated to Philadelphia.

In 1913, she published Reminiscences of Colored People of Princeton, N.J., 1800–1900, which was a study of Princeton's Black community.

Anna Bustill Smith remained in Philadelphia until her death in August 1945. Her funeral was held on August 10, 1945, at the Jennie Morris funeral parlor, 717 South 19th Street in Philadelphia, and she was buried in Princeton, New Jersey. She was survived by her children: daughters Anna Smith of Philadelphia and Mrs. Virgie S. Rhetta of Chicago, sons John Smith of Chicago and Curtis Smith of Los Angeles, grandchildren Lieutenant Carl W. Rhetta and Staff Sergeant J. Curtis Rhetta, and one great-grandchild, J. Curtis Rhetta Jr.
