= Lincoln Cemetery (Harrisburg, Pennsylvania) =

African American cemetery in Harrisburg, Pennsylvania, US

- Interactive map of Lincoln Cemetery

Details
- Established: 1877
- Location: Harrisburg, Pennsylvania
- Country: United States
- Coordinates: 40°16′50.49″N 76°51′19.67″W
- Owned by: Wesley Union A.M.E Zion Church
- No. of interments: over 5500
- Find a Grave: Lincoln Cemetery

Lincoln Cemetery was founded in November 1877 by the Wesley Union African Methodist Episcopal Zion Church (A.M.E. Zion Church), and is located at 201 South 30th Street in the Susquehanna Township area of Harrisburg, Pennsylvania.

== History ==
The oldest extant Black cemetery in Harrisburg, Lincoln contains many people re-interred from the approximately five original African-American Burial Grounds in the city of Harrisburg. Members of the Wesley Union church, spread out through the Harrisburg Area, were active in the Underground Railroad. Civil War veterans, including Ephraim Slaughter, the last surviving Civil War Veteran of Harrisburg are buried in the cemetery. He served in the 37th regiment of the U.S. Colored Troops and the 3rd N.C. Colored Infantry. It is the site of one of the historical markers in Dauphin County, Pennsylvania. The cemetery was listed on the National Register of Historic Places in 2026.

== Restoration ==
In July 2021, members of the descendant community of Lincoln Cemetery began clean-up, restoration and reclamation of the grounds.

== Notable people ==
- William H. Day, abolitionist, educator, and newspaper publisher
- Thomas Morris Chester, African-American attorney and Civil War correspondent
- Harriet McClintock Marshall, nicknamed "Ma", assisted with the care and education of the escaped slaves traveling on the Underground Railroad stop located in the old Wesley Church.

== See also ==
- Mount Zion Cemetery (Kingston, New York)
- St. David African Methodist Episcopal Zion Cemetery
