= East Harrisburg Cemetery =

- Interactive map of East Harrisburg Cemetery

Details
- Established: 1874
- Location: 2260 Herr Street, Harrisburg, Pennsylvania 17103
- Country: United States
- Coordinates: 40.282°N 76.850°W
- Type: Public
- Website: Official website
- Find a Grave: East Harrisburg Cemetery

East Harrisburg Cemetery is an historic cemetery located in Harrisburg, Pennsylvania. The older, eastern section of the cemetery is located within the borough of Penbrook; the western section is located in Susquehanna Township.

== History ==
Established in 1874, the cemetery received its name from its location. Straddling the border between the borough of Penbrook, formerly known as East Harrisburg, and Susquehanna Township, the cemetery's operations were administered in 1875 by David Mumma (president) and Samuel Landis (secretary-treasurer). Lots sold from "10 to 25 [each], according to location" in 1875.

As of 2019, the cemetery remained in active use.

== Notable burials ==
- Les Bell (1901–1985) – was a professional baseball player
- Isaac Hoffer Doutrich (1871–1941) – was a Republican member of the U.S. House of Representatives from Pennsylvania, former city councilman of Harrisburg.
- Walter Mann Mumma (1890–1961) – was a prominent businessman and Republican member of the U.S. House of Representatives from Pennsylvania.
- Frank Crawford Sites (1864–1935) – was a Democratic member of the U.S. House of Representatives from Pennsylvania.

Micheal K. Williams: (1966-2022) Actor and Dancer. Most prominently featured in HBO’s critically acclaimed drama, “The Wire” as Omar Little. Williams also starred in numerous other feature films and television shows.

== See also ==
- List of Pennsylvania cemeteries
