= Pennsylvania Governor's Residence =

Building in Pennsylvania, United States

Governor's Residence
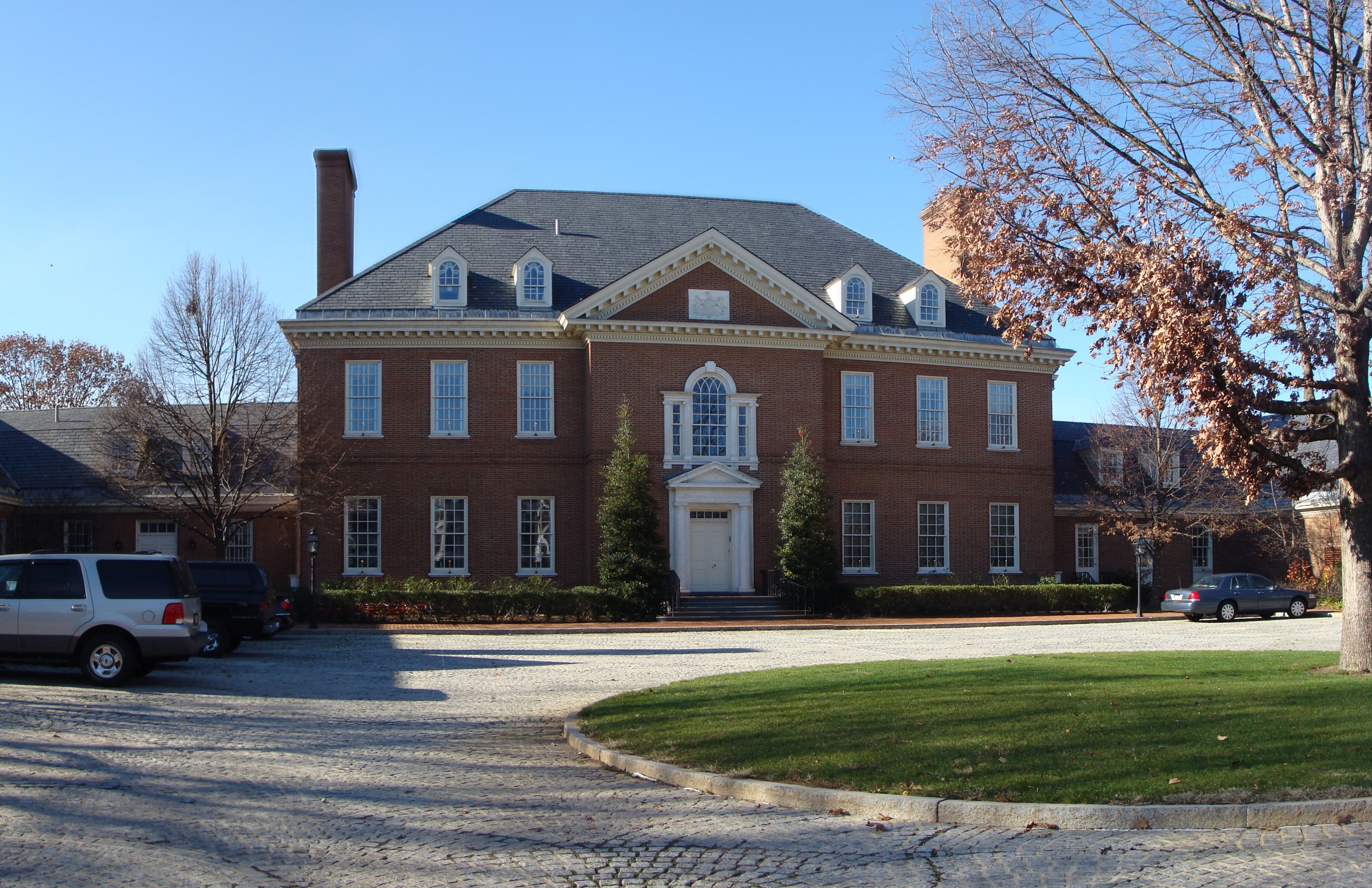
- The entrance to the Governor's Residence in 2010.
- Interactive map of the Governor's Residence area

General information
- Architectural style: Georgian
- Location: 2035 North Front Street, Harrisburg, Pennsylvania; United States
- Coordinates: 40.2775°N 76.8988°W
- Construction started: December 1966
- Completed: December 1968
- Inaugurated: February 1969
- Cost: US$2 million
- Client: Governor of Pennsylvania
- Owner: Pennsylvania Department of General Services

Design and construction
- Architect: George M. Ewing

Website
- Official Website

Pennsylvania Historical Marker
- Official name: Governor's Residence

The Pennsylvania Governor's Residence is the official residence of the governor of Pennsylvania, located in the Uptown neighborhood of Harrisburg, Pennsylvania.

== Description and usage ==
The neo-Georgian residence was built from 1966 to 1968 and designed by George M. Ewing, heading an architectural firm in Philadelphia. The mansion was only used for official functions and meetings during Governor Tom Wolf's administration because he commuted from his private residence in nearby Mount Wolf. Incumbent Governor Josh Shapiro and his family have resided in the Governor's Residence since 2023.

The Pennsylvania Governor’s Residence is a 29,000-square-foot (2,700 m^{2}) home. The seven-bay brick front has a wide projecting pedimented central bay, in which a Palladian window perches on a pedimented doorway. The mansion is home to two Steinway grand pianos used for concerts and to entertain dinner guests. Every holiday season, the house is open for special tours.

The mansion is adjacent to the Susquehanna River, and flooding has proven to be a significant hazard. Water intrusion in the basement area is a frequent issue, and the mansion has been evacuated three times since its construction due to serious inundation. The first and most serious time was during Hurricane Agnes in 1972; then-governor Milton Shapp and his wife, Muriel, evacuated for the weekend and returned by boat to inspect the flooded damage, shown in a common photograph at the time. The most recent was 2011 during Tropical Storm Lee.

In 2021, following years of planning, a $1.9 million renovation began on the courtyard to restore more greenspace, amenities, and accessibility.

== 2025 arson attack ==
At approximately 2:00 a.m. on April 13, 2025, an arsonist set fire to the residence. Governor Josh Shapiro and his family were safely evacuated, however, the southern portion of the residence sustained significant damage. Later that day, Cody Allen Balmer, a 38-year-old former mechanic from nearby Penbrook, Pennsylvania, turned himself in and was charged with terrorism, attempted murder, aggravated arson, and aggravated assault. Balmer reported that he "harbor[ed] hatred" towards the governor and was planning to physically assault Governor Shapiro using a small sledgehammer had he encountered him. Following Balmer's arrest, his mother Christie Balmer told CBS News that her son has schizophrenia and bipolar disorder and claimed that he "went off his medication." The attack occurred on the first night of Passover, around 2 am, just hours after Shapiro and his family had partaken in a Passover Seder. Balmer told police that he used two Molotov cocktails to set the residence on fire.
