= Frank C. Sites =

American politician

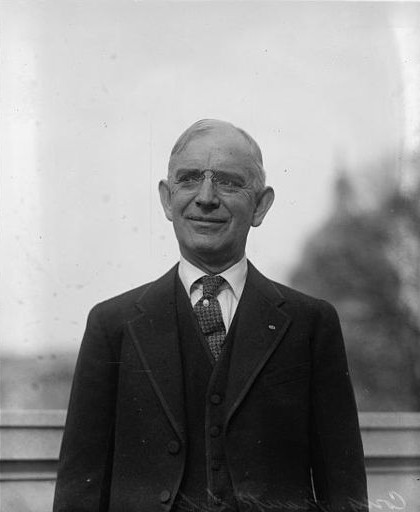
Frank Crawford Sites

Frank Crawford Sites (December 24, 1864 – May 23, 1935) was a Democratic member of the U.S. House of Representatives from Pennsylvania.

== Biography ==
Frank C. Sites was born in Shippensburg, Pennsylvania on December 24, 1864. In 1875, he moved with his parents to Harrisburg, Pennsylvania. He attended the public schools, learned the trade of watchmaker and jeweler, and subsequently practiced those trades in Harrisburg.

From 1903 to 1912, he was a director on the Harrisburg school board, and was then appointed postmaster of Harrisburg in 1913, serving until his successor was appointed in 1922.

Sites was elected as a Democrat to the Sixty-eighth Congress, but was an unsuccessful candidate for reelection in 1924. He returned to Harrisburg and engaged in the bond business.

== Death and interment ==
Sites died in Harrisburg on May 23, 1935 and was interred at the East Harrisburg Cemetery.

U.S. House of Representatives
Preceded by John M. Rose	Member of the U.S. House of Representatives from Pennsylvania's 19th congressional district 1923–1925	Succeeded by Joshua W. Swartz
