= Salem United Church of Christ (Harrisburg, Pennsylvania) =

Historic church in Pennsylvania, United States

- U.S. National Register of Historic Places
- Pennsylvania state historical marker
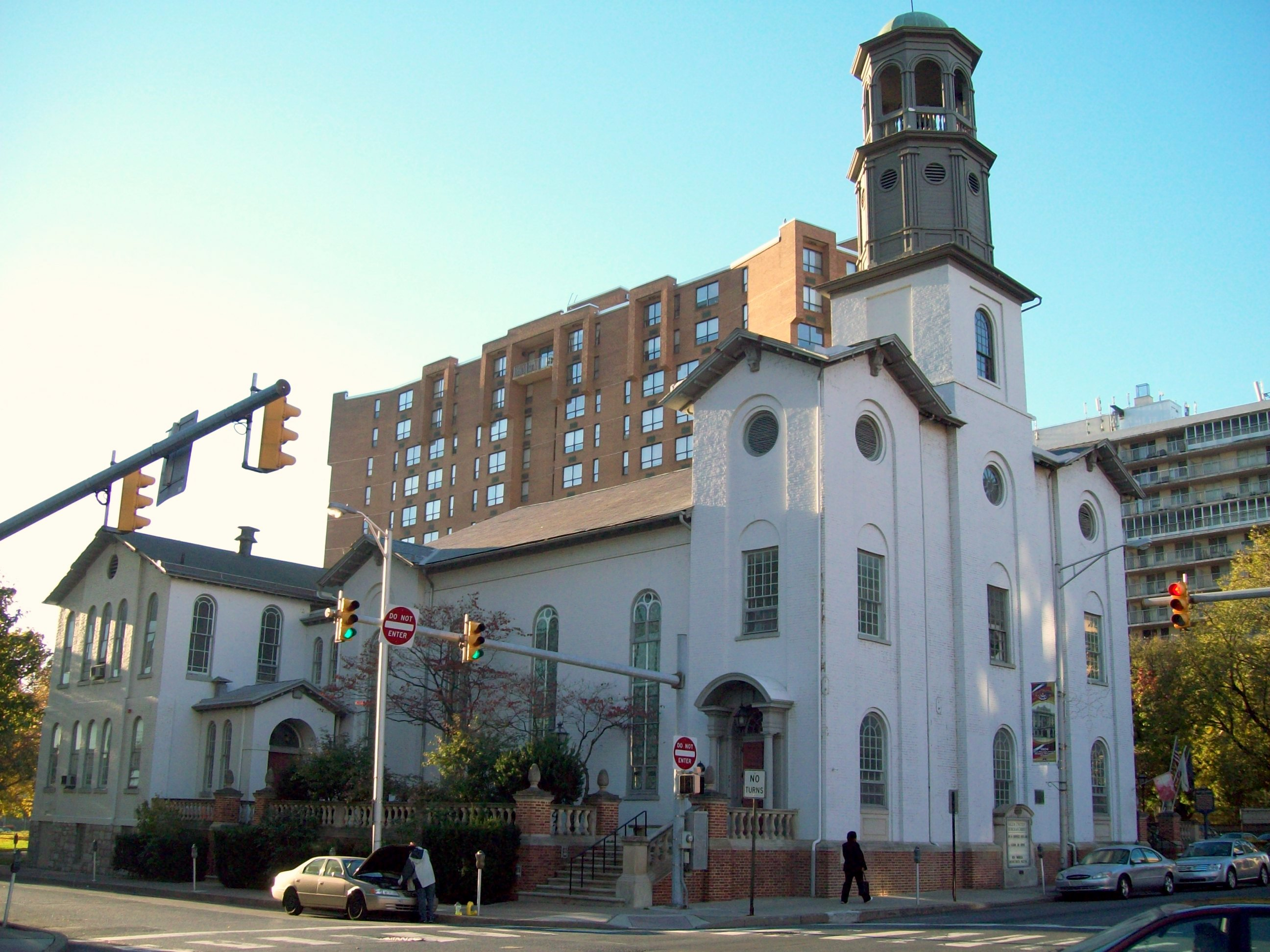
- Salem United Church of Christ, November 2010

- Location within Pennsylvania Location within the United States
- Location: 231 Chestnut St., Harrisburg, Pennsylvania
- Coordinates: 40°15′34″N 76°52′45″W
- Area: 0.5 acres (0.20 ha)
- Built: 1821-1822
- Architect: Pool, Samuel & Wilson, Henry V.
- Architectural style: Early Republic, Italianate, Classical
- NRHP reference No.: 75001639

Significant dates
- Added to NRHP: April 23, 1975
- Designated PHMC: June 11, 1968

The Salem United Church of Christ, formerly known as the Old Salem Reformed Church, is an historic, Reformed church that is located at 231 Chestnut Street in Harrisburg, Dauphin County, Pennsylvania.

It was added to the National Register of Historic Places in 1975.

== History and architectural features ==
Built between 1821 and 1822, this historic structure is a two-story, brick building that was designed in a Classical style. It features a large square bell tower that is topped by a domed cupola. The tower is flanked by two, three-story towers with stepped gables. A two-story, Sunday school annex was built to the rear of the church in 1862.
