= J. Howard Wert =

American historian, author, and Civil War veteran

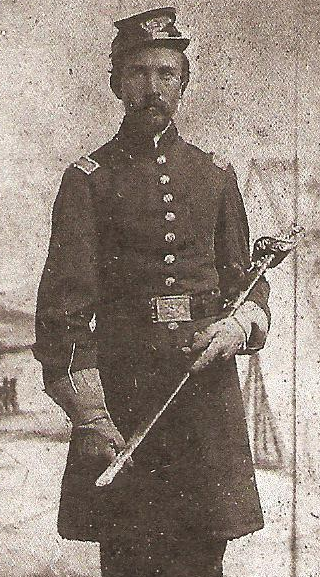
- J. Howard Wert during the Civil War
- Born: February 12, 1841; Gettysburg, Pennsylvania
- Died: March 11, 1920 (aged 79)
- Known for: Civil War veteran and collector, Underground Railroad conductor

J. Howard Wert (February 12, 1841 - March 11, 1920) was an author, educator, and Civil War veteran and collector.

== Family and youth ==
John Howard Wert was born on February 12, 1841, near Gettysburg, Pennsylvania, to a prosperous and prominent Pennsylvania German family, the only son of Adam and Catherine Houghtelin Wert. His father was a successful farmer and businessman and a veteran of the War of 1812; his grandfather and great-grandfather served in the American Revolution. All four generations had strong abolitionist views and Adam Wert was a close friend of Thaddeus Stevens. J. Howard Wert attended Pennsylvania College (now Gettysburg College) where he and other members of his local fraternity were active in the Underground Railroad. Wert graduated in 1861 and became a teacher.

== Civil War ==
In the summer of 1863 the Army of Northern Virginia invaded Pennsylvania. A member of the Adams Rifles militia unit, Wert served as a scout for the Union forces, gathering information on Rebel strength in Chambersburg before the Battle of Gettysburg. On the first day of the battle, he guided the First Corps to the Seminary and assisted in the retreat to Cemetery Hill. On July 2 he helped Union forces reach Little Round Top when it was threatened on the left of the Union line; that night he led Geary's Division back to Culp's Hill on the Union right. On the final day of the battle he helped reinforcements reach Cemetery Ridge to repel Pickett's Charge.

In the days following the battle Wert walked the battlefield gathering artifacts left by the soldiers who fought there. Wert carefully notated exactly where each piece was discovered, which provided valuable information for later researchers. This was the basis for his Civil War collection, described during his lifetime as "Probably the rarest and most valuable private collection of war relics from the battlefields of the Civil War . . ."

Wert enlisted on September 8, 1864, in Company G of the 209th Pennsylvania Volunteers, serving as sergeant and 1st Sergeant before being commissioned 2nd Lieutenant on February 13, 1865. The unit served in the Army of the James and the Army of the Potomac and saw action during the Siege of Petersburg, helping to repulse the attack on Fort Stedman.

== Author and educator ==
After the war Wert served as the principal of Gettysburg High School and later as Superintendent of Adams County Schools. In 1875, he moved to Harrisburg where he taught at and later became principal of the Boy's High School, a period covered in his book Annals of the Boy's High School of Harrisburg, 1875-1893. During his time as principal the Boy's High School admitted and graduated its first African-American students; Wert, with his progressive ideas on race, was important in overcoming public opposition and ensuring that the students received fair treatment. Wert served as the first principal of Harrisburg High School from 1893-94.

Wert was an active member of the Grand Army of the Republic and wrote frequently about the Battle of Gettysburg and the Civil War, while continuing to acquire Civil War artifacts. Notable Civil War books include A Complete Hand-book of the Monuments and Indications and Guide to the Positions on the Gettysburg Battlefield (with an abridged version being released in 1890, The Two Great Armies at Gettysburg, Being chapters I, II and III of Gettysburg and Its Monuments) and Poems of Camp and Hearth.

Wert also wrote numerous newspaper articles and letters; a series of 35 articles published in 1912 and 1913 regarding Harrisburg's Eighth Ward before it was demolished in an urban renewal project has been collected and published. Wert also wrote a number of school books and novels.

Wert married Emma Letitia Aughinbaugh, a teacher, in 1869. They had four sons and a daughter. Wert died on March 11, 1920, in Harrisburg and is buried in Gettysburg.

Partial List of Books by J. Howard Wert
A Complete Hand-book of the Monuments and Indications and Guide to the Positions on the Gettysburg Battlefield
The Two Great Armies at Gettysburg, Being chapters I, II and III of Gettysburg and Its Monuments
Poems of Camp and Hearth
Little Stories of Gettysburg
Historical Souvenir of the Fiftieth Anniversary of the Battle of Gettysburg, July 1–4, 1913
In the Hospitals of Gettysburg
Gettysburg Gem Souvenir
History of the 209th Regiment, Pennsylvania Volunteer Infantry
Annals of the Boy's High School of Harrisburg 1875-1893
Mystic League of Three (novel)
God's Centennial
Rhyme and Reason
Alecto and Ebony (novel)
Five Years in the Grave
School Composition Work Made Attractive
