= The Aliened American =

Black abolitionist newspaper

The Aliened American was a newspaper in Cleveland. It was the city's first Black newspaper and is believed to have been the third African American newspaper in the United States. Its first edition was published on April 9, 1853. William H. Day was the editor-in-residence and was assisted by Samuel Ringgold Ward, a former slave living in Toronto, and Rev. James W. C. Pennington of New York. Day moved to Buxton, Ontario, in 1855. It was printed on a monthly basis for one more year as the People's Exposition.

In the first issue, it stated that Black Americans had been made into "aliens—through their Law, their Public Opinion and their Community-Regulations." "Song of the Aliened American" was written by Joshua McCarter Simpson (to the tune of "My Country, 'Tis of Thee"). The term "alien" is used to refer to the descendants of enslaved people and Jefferson's concept of inalienable rights.

== See also ==
- List of African-American newspapers in Ohio
- List of African-American newspapers and media outlets
- African-American newspapers
