= Linden Grove (Castle Shannon, Pennsylvania) =

- Formerly listed on the U.S. National Register of Historic Places
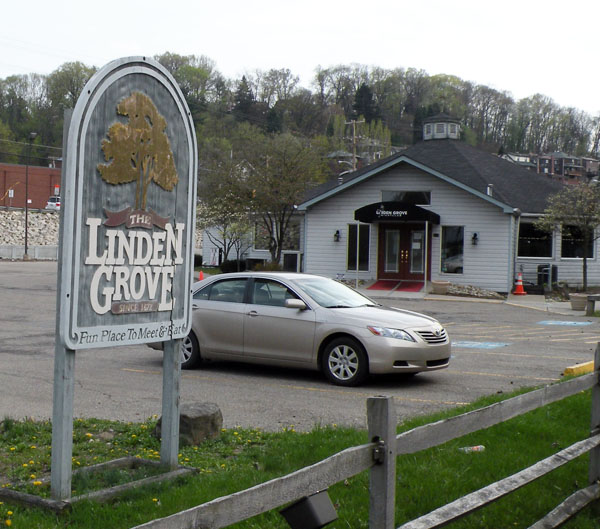
- The current building at this location

- Location within Pennsylvania Location within the United States
- Location: 1100 Grove Road, Castle Shannon, Pennsylvania
- Coordinates: 40°22′3.14″N 80°0′51.44″W
- Built: circa 1872
- NRHP reference No.: 87001970

Significant dates
- Removed from NRHP: January 20, 2000
- Delisted: January 20, 2000

Linden Grove was once a nationally designated historic place located at 1100 Grove Road in Castle Shannon, Pennsylvania, but the original building (circa 1872) was torn down and it was delisted on January 20, 2000. The current building there is a more recent construction called The Linden Grove Nightclub. The original "Linden Grove was built as an attraction to German picnickers, as were several other groves patronized by various ethnic groups. Wagons with benches met picnickers at the train station and took them to whichever grove catered to their nationality."
