= Thomas Morris Chester =

American war correspondent, lawyer and soldier

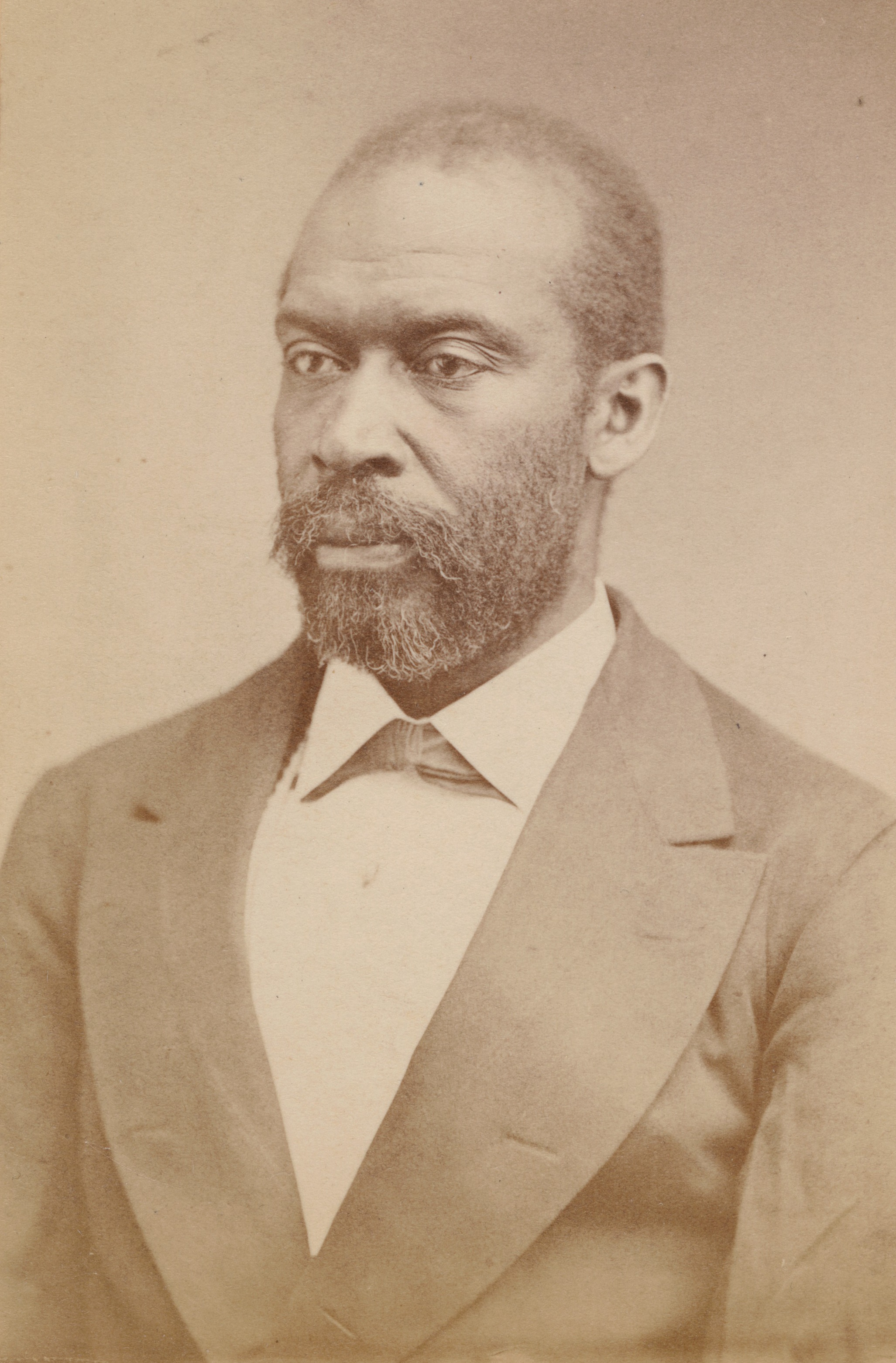
- Chester circa 1870 at the age of 36.
- Born: May 11, 1834; Harrisburg, Pennsylvania, U.S.
- Died: September 30, 1892 (aged 58); Harrisburg, Pennsylvania, U.S.
- Resting place: Lincoln Cemetery, Harrisburg, Pennsylvania
- Occupations: Journalist, lawyer and soldier

Thomas Morris Chester (May 11, 1834 – September 30, 1892) was an American war correspondent, lawyer and soldier who took part in the American Civil War.

== Early life and education ==
Chester was born at the corner of Third and Market Street in Harrisburg, Pennsylvania, on May 11, 1834, the fourth child of George and Jane Marie Chester. At the age of 16, Chester attended Akron College, an African-American academy in Pittsburgh. As a student there, his classmates included Jeremiah A. Brown, Benjamin Tucker Tanner, and James T. Bradford. In May 1853, he moved to Monrovia, Liberia where he attended Alexander High School. In September 1854, he returned to the United States and enrolled at Thetford Academy in Vermont, where he graduated in 1856. He then returned to Liberia where he taught school to Africans of former American slaves. He left Africa around the start of the American Civil War in 1861, first moving to Liverpool and London, England, and then to the United States.

== Civil War ==
During the upcoming of the civil war Chester served as a recruiter of black troops and raised the 54th and 55th Massachusetts Infantry Regiment. Later, he led two Black emergency militia regiments to defend a potential attack of Harrisburg, Pennsylvania during the famous Gettysburg campaign in June–July 1863, the first time that Pennsylvania had issued weapons to African Americans. From August 1864 to the end of the Civil War in May 1865, Chester worked as a war correspondent for The Philadelphia Press, which was a major daily newspaper at that time.

== Europe ==
When the civil war ended, he toured Europe. He passed the winter of 1866-67 at the court of Alexander II of Russia where he was given the title Captain Chester in deference to his service in the war. He visited the 1867 International Exposition held in Paris where he met Lysius Salomon, Alexandre Dumas, and Ira Aldridge. He settled in London, England, to study law at Middle Temple in 1867 and became England's first African-American barrister when he was called to the bar on April 30, 1870.

== Later life ==
He returned to the U.S. in 1871 and settled in Louisiana, where he practiced law and where he was the brigadier-general of the militia and the superintendent of schools in 1875. In 1884 he was elected president of the Wilmington, Wrightsville, and Onslow Railroad. Chester was deeply involved with the Grand United Order of Odd Fellows in America and served as the Worthy Grand Scribe of Council, No. 30, in New Orleans, Louisiana in 1885. He returned to his home town of Harrisburg due to illness where he died at the home of his mother at 305 Chestnut Street on September 30, 1892. Chester is buried in Lincoln Cemetery, Penbrook, Pennsylvania.

== Legacy ==
In 2022, the town of Harrisburg, Pennsylvania recognized T. Morris Chester's lifelong fight for civil rights and freedom with the dedication of a new monument titled "Gathering at the Crossroads" at Fourth and Walnut streets as well as a newly renamed street in his honor. T. Morris Chester Way starts at the corner of North 5th Street and goes to the Susquehanna River. On this street will be the T. Morris Chester Welcome Center, in partnership with the McCormick Public Library and the Commonwealth Monument Project. The Center serves as a welcome and access point to the library as well as pay homage to T. Morris Chester and the historic black neighborhood, Old Eight Ward, in Harrisburg where the center is located.
