= Mount Zion Cemetery (Kingston, New York) =

Historic site in Ulster County, New York

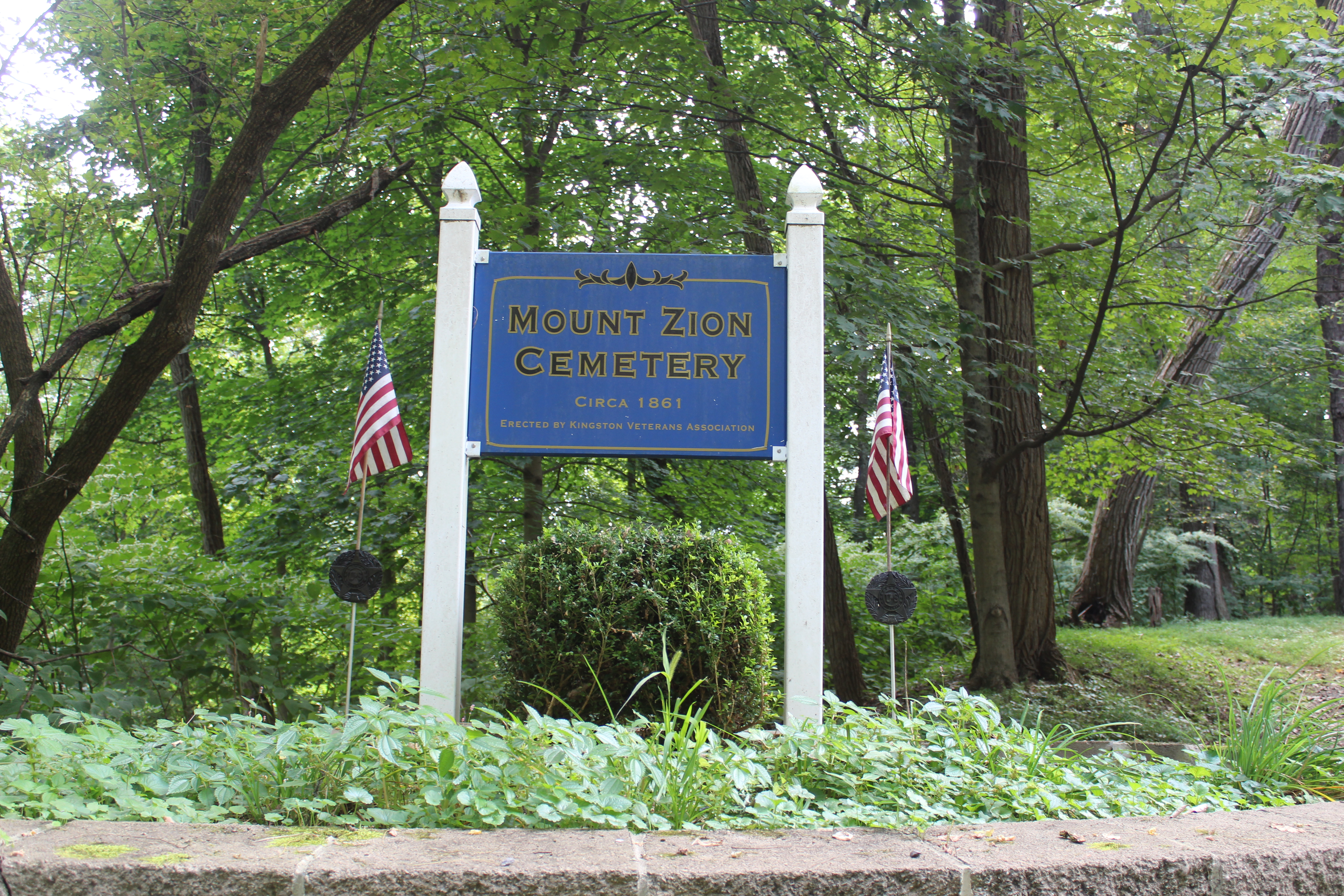
- Entrance of the Mount Zion Cemetery
- Interactive map of Mount Zion Cemetery

Details
- Established: 1856
- Location: 190 South Wall Street, Kingston, New York
- Coordinates: 41°55′9″N 74°0′42″W
- Find a Grave: Mount Zion Cemetery

Mount Zion Cemetery (c. 1856–1967) is a historic African-American cemetery owned by the A.M.E. Zion Church of Kingston. The cemetery is on a 2.4-acre (0.97 ha) lot located at 190 South Wall Street in the city of Kingston. It is in the city's Fifth Ward, less than a mile south of the church.

== History ==
Established in the mid-nineteenth century, the cemetery provides a final resting place for prominent individuals and families who were part of Kingston's African American community. Due to the legacy of Slavery in the Hudson Valley, many of the surnames were Dutch, French Huguenot, and British given by the families who had enslaved them. The first burial was in 1856 (Samuel Tappan) and the last (known) burial was in 1967 (Beatrice Fitzgerald).

Currently, there are 104 grave markers, and an estimated 13 of which were born prior to manumission in New York State (signed into law on July 4, 1827). The Mount Zion Cemetery also holds the remains of many African-American veterans, including 26 Union soldiers from the civil war. They were in the ranks of the 11th, 20th, 27th and 39th Regiments of the United States Colored Infantry (USCT) who were laid to rest there from 1865 to 1911 (est). The cemetery also holds the remains of four African-American veterans from the First World War, and two from World War II, and several "Buffalo Soldiers".

A notable person was Rev. Jeremiah R.B. Smith. Smith was a soldier, anti-slavery writer, and pastor at the A.M.E. Zion Church of Kingston.

On March 3, 2021, both Mt. Zion Cemetery and AME Zion Church of Kingston were listed on the National Register of Historic Places. The cemetery was previously listed as a historic site by the City of Kingston's Historic Landmark Commission in 1983.

== See also ==
- Category:African-American cemeteries
