= Joseph Cassey Bustill =

- Born: September 29, 1822; Philadelphia, Pennsylvania
- Died: August 19, 1895 (aged 72)
- Burial place: Eden Cemetery
- Occupation: teacher
- Known for: Guiding enslaved people to freedom
- Spouse: Sarah Humphreys
- Family: Bustill family

Joseph Cassey Bustill (September 29, 1822–August 19, 1895) was an African American conductor in the Underground Railroad, operating primarily in Philadelphia to aid refugee slaves.

== Birth and marriage ==
Joseph Cassey Bustill was born in Philadelphia in 1822 to David Bustill and Elizabeth W. Hicks (a.k.a. Mary Hicks), members of a prosperous family of people of color; his father had English, African and Lenape ancestry. Joseph's brother was: Charles Hicks Bustill (1816–1890), who became prominent in the Underground Railroad.

Joseph married Sarah Humphreys (1829-?) and they had a child: Anna Amelia Bustill (1862-1945). He worked as a school teacher. But, like his brother, he supported abolitionism and became active in the Underground Railroad, serving as what was called a "shipping agent" to arrange shelter and passage for fugitive slaves.

== Career ==
A member of a group of activists at the Longwood Meeting in Kennett Square, Pennsylvania, Joseph C. Bustill "supported the efforts of some of the most outspoken abolitionists of antebellum America," according to historian Mary Ellen Snodgrass. Employed an educator at a school in Harrisburg, Pennsylvania, he also co-founded the First Colored Presbyterian Church, still standing as the Capital Presbyterian Church.

In chronicling the life of her father, Anna Bustill Smith wrote: "He was always a polished writer and convincing speaker. He was the youngest member of the remarkable Underground Railroad, being only seventeen." She then added that, as with her cousin, Paul Robeson, her father "was 'a citizen of no mean city'—a Philadelphian of the Philadelphians—and was able to add to its honor and glory."

During his time with the Underground Railroad, Joseph C. Bustill reportedly protected more than 1,000 runaway slaves, according to his daughter, operating in concert with William Still, the leader of the Pennsylvania Anti-Slavery Society, as well as Harrisburg Underground Railroad agents Thomas Morris Chester and William and Mary Jones.

== Extant letters ==
Harrisburg, March 24, 1856; Friend Still: I suppose you have seen those five large and three small packages I sent by way of Reading, consisting of three men and women and children. They arrived here this morning at 8:30 [am] o'clock and left twenty minutes past three [PM]. You will please send me any information likely to prove interesting in relation to them. Lately we have formed a society here called the Fugitive Slave Society. This is our first case, and I hope it will prove entirely successful. When you write, please inform me what signs or symbol you make use of in your dispatches, and any other information in relation to operations of the UR. Our reason for sending by the Reading Road, was to gain time; it is expected the owners will be in town this afternoon and by this Road we gained five hours' time, which is a matter of much importance, and we may have occasion to use it sometime in future. In great haste. Yours with great respect, Joseph C. Bustill.

Harrisburg, March 28, 1856; Friend Still: Your last [letter] came to hand in due season, and I am happy to hear of the safe arrival of those gents. I have before me the Power of Attorney of Mr. John S. Fiery, son of Mr. Henry Fiery, of Washington County, Maryland, the owner of those three men, two women and three children, who arrived in your town on the 24th or 25th of March. He graciously condescends to liberate the oldest in a year, and the remainder in proportional time, if they will come back; or to sell them their time for $1300. He is sick of the job, and is ready to make any conditions. Now, if you personally can get word to them and get them to send him a letter, in my charge, informing him of their whereabouts and prospects, I think it will be the best answer I can make to him. He will return in a week or two, to know what can be done. He offers $500 to see them. Or if you can send me word where they are, I will endeavor to write to them for his special satisfaction; or if you cannot do either, send me your latest information, for I intend to make him spend a few more dollars, and if possible get a little sicker of this bad job. Do try and send him a few bitter pills for his weak nerves and disturbed mind. Yours in great haste, Joseph C. Bustill.

Harrisburg, May 26, 1856; Friend Still: I embrace the opportunity presented by the visit of our friend, John F. Williams, to drop you a few lines in relation to our future operations. The Lightning Train was put on the Road last Monday, and as the traveling season has commenced and this is the southern route for Niagara Falls, I have concluded not to send by way of Auburn, except in cases of great danger; but hereafter we will use the Lightning Train, which leaves here at 1½ and arrives in your city at 5 o'clock in the morning, and I will telegraph about 5½ o'clock in the afternoon, so it may reach you before you close. These four are the only ones that have come since my last. The woman has been here some time waiting for her child and her beau, which she expects here about the first of June. If possible, please keep knowledge of her whereabouts, to enable me to inform him if he comes. I have nothing more to send you, except that John Fiery has visited us again and much to his chagrin received the information of their being in Canada. Yours as ever, Joseph C. Bustill.

Harrisburg, May 31, 1856; Wm. Still, N. 5th St. [Philadelphia]: I have sent via [sic] at two o'clock four large and two small hams. Jos. C. Bustill. 40
