= Penbrook, Pennsylvania =

Borough in Pennsylvania, US

- Borough
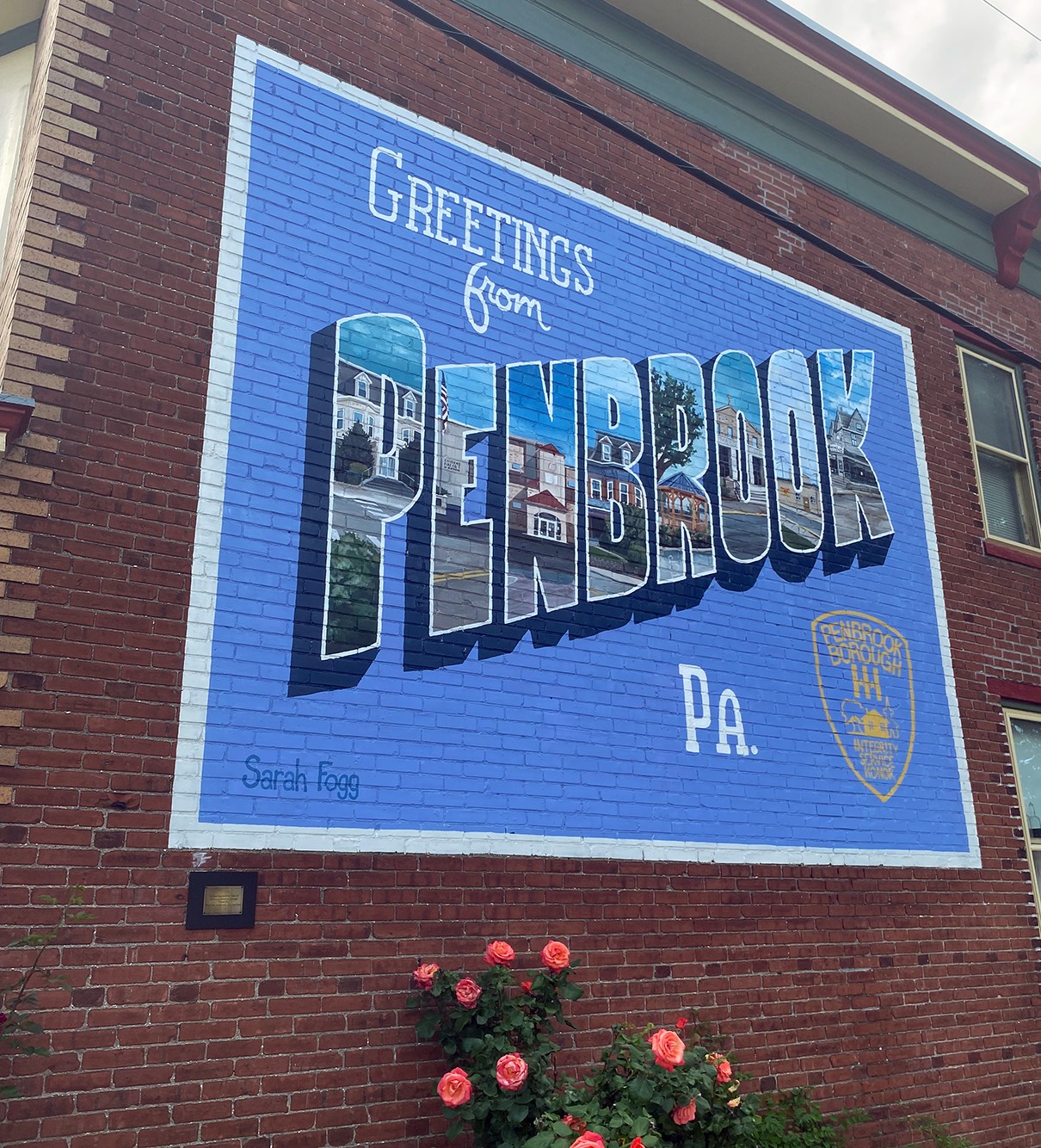
- Penbrook mural by Sarah Fogg as seen at Forney & Canby Streets, 2025

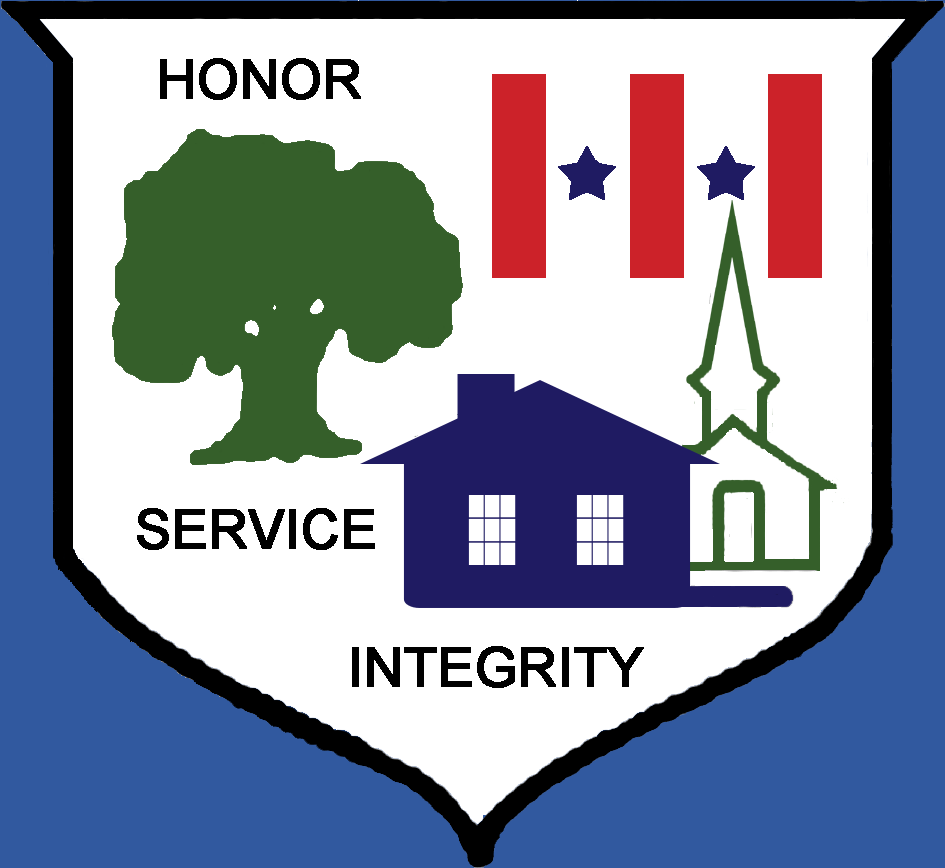
- Seal

- Location of Pennbrook in Dauphin County (right) and of Dauphin County in Pennsylvania (left)

- Location of Pennbrook in Pennsylvania and the United States Penbrook (the United States)
- Coordinates: 40°16′42″N 76°50′51″W
- Country: United States
- State: Pennsylvania
- County: Dauphin
- Settled: 1861
- Incorporated: 1894

Government
  - Type: Borough Council
  - Mayor: John McDonald

Area
  - Total: 0.45 sq mi (1.16 km^{2})
  - Land: 0.45 sq mi (1.16 km^{2})
  - Water: 0 sq mi (0.00 km^{2})
- Elevation: 490 ft (150 m)

Population (2020)
  - Total: 3,268
  - Density: 7,330.6/sq mi (2,830.36/km^{2})
- Time zone: UTC-5 (Eastern (EST))
  - Summer (DST): UTC-4 (EDT)
- ZIP Code: 17103
- Area code: 717
- FIPS code: 42-58712
- Website: www.penbrook.org

Penbrook is a borough in Dauphin County, Pennsylvania, United States, founded in 1861 and incorporated July 10, 1894. Penbrook was once named East Harrisburg and still maintains a Harrisburg postal ZIP code. The population was 3,268 at the 2020 census.

Penbrook is part of the Harrisburg–Carlisle metropolitan statistical area.

== Geography ==
Penbrook is located in southern Dauphin County at 40°16′42″N 76°50′51″W (40.278445, -76.847463). It is bordered to the south by the city of Harrisburg.

According to the U.S. Census Bureau, the borough has a total area of 0.45 square miles (1.16 km^{2}), all of which is land.

== Parks ==
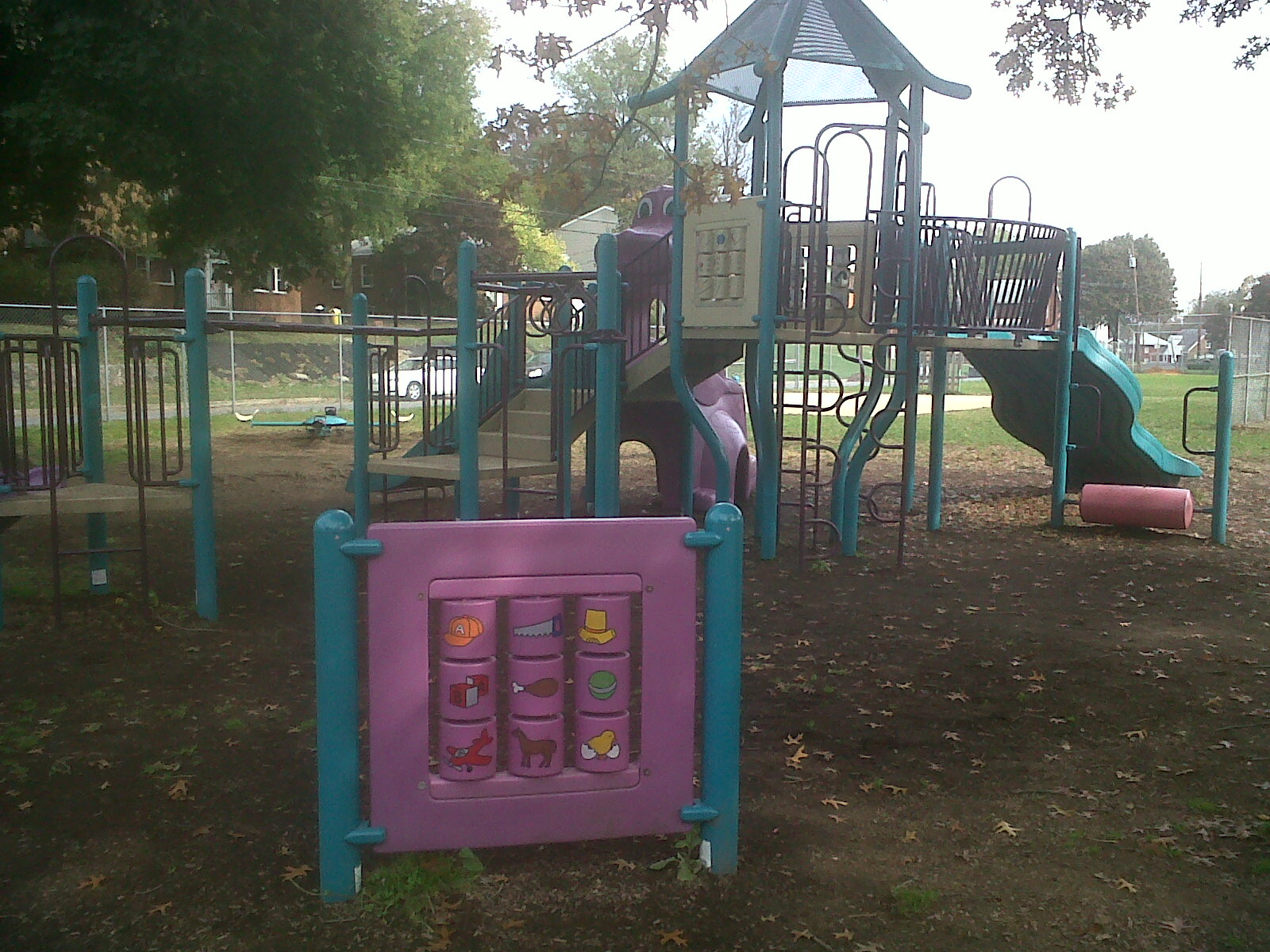
Little Valley Park in Pennbrook

Penbrook Park is an 8.5-acre (3.4 ha) recreational area in the southeast corner of the borough and contains ball fields, a large wooden play structure, basketball courts, concession stand, and a picnic pavilion. It was also the home of the former Penbrook Swim Club. The park is connected to the Capital Area Greenbelt, a 20-mile (32 km) link to Riverfront Park and other regional parks.

Little Valley Park with 1.5 acres (0.61 ha) was given to the community in 1960 by S. Merl Mosby, who reclaimed a Depression-era landfill with more than 2,000 loads of dirt from nearby Edgemont. It contains a ball field, a play structure with a large purple dinosaur, baseball field and basketball courts and is located near East Harrisburg Cemetery and the St. Margaret Mary school.

Elm Street Station Park is located adjacent to the Penbrook Borough Office. The park offers a play structure, seating, a rain garden, and a total body fitness exercise system.

Reservoir Park, with 85 acres (34 ha), is adjacent to the southwest border of the borough, with Levitt Performing Arts Pavilion and the National Civil War Museum.

Since 1952, the Penbrook Athletic Association has led the community's recreational programs.

== Government and politics ==
There are four voting precincts, one for each ward, though all four polling stations are located in the same room in the Community Building.

The mayor is John McDonald.

=== Borough council ===
Two council members are elected from each of the borough's four wards.

1st Ward	2nd Ward	3rd Ward	4th Ward
Robin Dry	Denise Lovejoy	Nathaniel Shaw^{2}	Jason Seaman
Nathan Newcomer^{1}	Ben Stokes	Charles Burdine	Nacole Moore

^{1} Council President, ^{2} Council Vice President

Council meetings are held on the first Monday of every month at 6:30 pm at the Borough Building.

Caucus meetings are held on the third Monday of every month at 6:30 pm at the Borough Building.

=== Legislators ===
- State Representative Justin C. Fleming, Democrat, 105th district
- State Senator Patty Kim, Democrat, 15th district
- US Representative Scott Perry, Republican, 10th district

== Demographics ==
Historical population
Census	Pop.	Note	%±
1900	864		—
1910	1,462		69.2%
1920	2,072		41.7%
1930	3,567		72.2%
1940	3,627		1.7%
1950	3,691		1.8%
1960	3,671		−0.5%
1970	3,379		−8.0%
1980	3,006		−11.0%
1990	2,791		−7.2%
2000	3,044		9.1%
2010	3,008		−1.2%
2020	3,274		8.8%
2021 (est.)	3,260	▼	−0.4%

=== 2020 census ===
As of the 2020 census, Penbrook had a population of 3,274. The median age was 35.2 years. 26.0% of residents were under the age of 18 and 11.4% of residents were 65 years of age or older. For every 100 females there were 95.3 males, and for every 100 females age 18 and over there were 90.9 males age 18 and over.

100.0% of residents lived in urban areas, while 0.0% lived in rural areas.

There were 1,323 households in Penbrook, of which 33.0% had children under the age of 18 living in them. Of all households, 29.0% were married-couple households, 25.2% were households with a male householder and no spouse or partner present, and 36.4% were households with a female householder and no spouse or partner present. About 32.9% of all households were made up of individuals and 9.9% had someone living alone who was 65 years of age or older.

There were 1,450 housing units, of which 8.8% were vacant. The homeowner vacancy rate was 2.7% and the rental vacancy rate was 6.9%.

Racial composition as of the 2020 census
Race	Number	Percent
White	1,327	40.5%
Black or African American	1,155	35.3%
American Indian and Alaska Native	19	0.6%
Asian	144	4.4%
Native Hawaiian and Other Pacific Islander	2	0.1%
Some other race	227	6.9%
Two or more races	400	12.2%
Hispanic or Latino (of any race)	501	15.3%

=== 2000 census ===
As of the 2000 census, there were 3,044 people, 1,307 households, and 764 families residing in the borough. The population density was 6,636.1 inhabitants per square mile (2,562.2/km^{2}). There were 1,398 housing units at an average density of 3,047.7 units per square mile (1,176.7 units/km^{2}). The racial makeup of the borough was 77.33% White, 15.24% African American, 0.23% Native American, 1.61% Asian, 1.87% from other races, and 3.71% from two or more races. Hispanic or Latino of any race were 4.60% of the population.

There were 1,307 households, out of which 30.0% had children under the age of 18 living with them, 39.6% were married couples living together, 15.6% had a female householder with no husband present, and 41.5% were non-families. 36.3% of all households were made up of individuals, and 10.0% had someone living alone who was 65 years of age or older. The average household size was 2.32 and the average family size was 3.04.

In the borough the population was spread out, with 26.3% under the age of 18, 8.1% from 18 to 24, 33.8% from 25 to 44, 20.1% from 45 to 64, and 11.7% who were 65 years of age or older. The median age was 35 years. For every 100 females, there were 93.9 males. For every 100 females age 18 and over, there were 92.2 males.

The median income for a household in the borough was $35,341, and the median income for a family was $44,375. Males had a median income of $32,128 versus $26,061 for females. The per capita income for the borough was $18,274. About 4.4% of families and 6.2% of the population were below the poverty line, including 8.7% of those under age 18 and 3.2% of those age 65 or over.

== Education ==
Opening in 1901, and with additions in the 1930s and 1950s, the Penbrook School initially educated the students through 12 years, but later only educated children through 10th grade. Older students transferred to John Harris HS or Susquehanna Township High School.

In 1955, the school became part of the new Central Dauphin School District. The building served as an elementary school until 1982 and now serves as the home to Infinity Charter School. A reunion is held for former students in even-numbered years.

St. Margaret Mary Parish School of the Roman Catholic Diocese of Harrisburg was established in March 1948, with the School Sisters of Notre Dame teaching. Additions were made to the building in 1958, 1985, 2000 and 2011. In 2009 both 3-year-old and Pre-K programs were added. After the completion of a new church off campus, the original church was turned into a gym and multi-purpose area for the school and parish community.

== See also ==
- Lincoln Cemetery
