= Tanner's Alley =

Area in Harrisburg by 1811

Coordinates: 40.2628°N 76.8815°W

Tanner's Alley, also called Tanner's Lane, was used to describe an area in Harrisburg by 1811. Many of the city's population of free blacks lived along or near Tanner's Alley, a 500-foot section of the road. It is located along the present-day Capital Park.

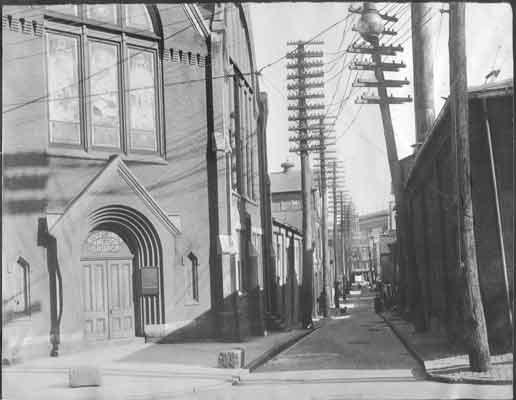
Wesley Union AME Zion Church, corner of Tanner's Alley and South Street, Harrisburg, PA, circa 1910.

By 1850, 900 free blacks, making up 12% of the city's population lived in Harrisburg. Residents of the alley were more likely to be the poorest residents. Churches, restaurants, dance halls, and business were also in the Tanner's Alley. The Wesley Union African Methodist Episcopal Zion Church, founded in 1816, was located there, as well as other Underground Railroad stations in the homes of free black men and women. The Black Masonic Hall was also located there.

Located at Commonwealth and Walnut streets in Harrisburg, Pennsylvania was central to the Underground Railroad and the abolitionist movements of the 19th century. It was along a route that blacks took to get to Canada. The houses of Joseph Bustill and Dr. William Jones, nicknamed "Pap," were stations there. A historical marker at Walnut Street near 4th Street in Harrisburg notes its significance:

In the 1850s, this area, known as Tanner's Alley, was important on the Underground Railroad. Fugitive slaves hid at Joseph Bustill's & William Jones' houses, a block apart. Frederick Douglass & William Lloyd Garrison spoke at Wesley Union AME Zion Church nearby.

— Pennsylvania Historical Marker
