= Wesley Union African Methodist Episcopal Zion Church =

Coordinates: 40°16′56.93″N 76°53′37.43″W

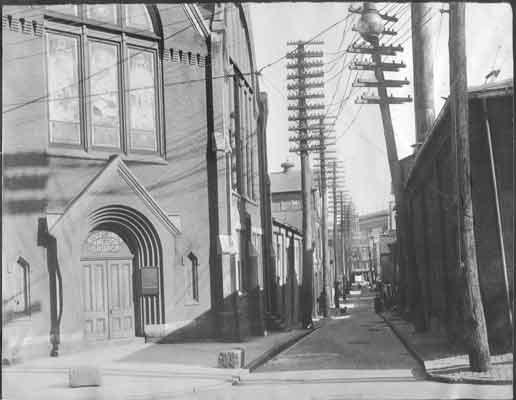
Wesley Union AME Zion Church, Harrisburg, PA, 1910.

The Wesley Union African Methodist Episcopal Zion Church is an AME Zion Church of Harrisburg, Pennsylvania. It was formally founded in 1829, starting with a log church building. As the congregation grew throughout the 19th century, the building was expanded until two brick church buildings were constructed in 1862 and 1898. For a period of time, the church operated a school for African American children.

== History ==
Wesley Union AME Zion Church was formally established on August 20, 1829, by some members of an existing black church. The first church was a log building at Third and Mulberry streets. In 1830, there were 115 members of the church. David Stevens was ordained an elder at the Philadelphia conference of 1830. He was assigned to the Harrisburg circuit, which included Harrisburg, New Market, York, Chambersburg, Shippensburg, and Middletown, Pennsylvania.

The church building was extended 16 feet to make room for new church members. A school was opened in the church for African American children under the leadership of the next pastor, Rev. Jacob D. Richardson. The tuition for the students was paid by county commissioners, in accordance with Pennsylvania school law at the time. In November 1832, students were transferred to a school on Walnut Street.

A brick building was constructed at Tanner and South streets. It opened on November 24, 1839. Stevens became the church's pastor for a second time. Rev. James A. Jones took over leadership in 1858.

A new church was built in 1862, with Rev. Abram Cole serving as its pastor. It was remodeled in 1884. In 1890, William H. Day became the church's pastor. A new church building was erected in 1894, when Rev. John F. Moreland was the pastor. Alice Dunbar Nelson was a frequent speaker at the church.

=== Underground Railroad ===
The church was a station on the Underground Railroad (UGRR), and church members were active in the UGRR and used their houses to shelter runaway enslaved people. They include Joseph Cassey Bustill and Dr. William "Pap" Jones.
