= William H. Day =

American educator (1825–1900)

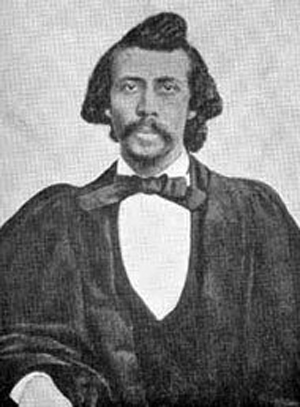
- Day c. 1870
- Born: William Howard Day; October 16, 1825; New York City, US
- Died: December 3, 1900 (aged 75); Harrisburg, Pennsylvania, US
- Burial place: Lincoln Cemetery, Harrisburg, Pennsylvania, US
- Education: Oberlin College
- Occupations: Abolitionist; editor; educator; minister
- Spouses: Lucy Stanton (m. 1852; div. 1872); Georgia F. Bell (after 1873)
- Children: 1

William Howard Day (October 16, 1825 – December 3, 1900) was a black abolitionist, editor, educator and minister. After his father died when he was four, Day went to live with J. P. Williston and his wife who ensured that he received a good education and learned the printer's trade. He received his bachelor's and master's degree from Oberlin College. He was a printer and newspaper editor. He fought for civil rights of African Americans a number of ways, as a journalist, teacher, and leader of the Freedmen's Bureau. He was an orator, making a speech to 10,000 newly emancipated people on what biographer Todd Mealy called the first march on Washington.

== Early life ==
Day was born free on October 16, 1825, in New York City to Eliza and John Day. Eliza was an abolitionist and a founding member of the first African Methodist Episcopal Zion Church in New York City. John, a sail maker and a veteran of the War of 1812, died when William was four years old. Eliza was left then to raise four children. Eliza Ann Dixon Day was active in the abolitionist movement and was present in 1833 at the Chatham Street Chapel when an anti-abolitionist mob attacked the meeting. She instilled in her children the importance of continuing the abolitionist movement. Despite having meager funds, she sent her children to private school and allowed a white educator to adopt him to secure his future education. William later credited her as a foundational role model who helped shape his future.

Day began attending school when he was four years of age. In 1834, he joined Henry Highland Garnet and David Ruggles to form the all-male Garrison Literary and Benevolent Association, named after abolitionist William Lloyd Garrison. Soon after, riots broke out in New York City against abolitionists, forcing the Day family to barricade themselves inside their residence.

White abolitionists John Payson Williston and his wife of Northampton, Massachusetts, became Day's guardians in 1838. Williston had seen Day speak at a publicly staged examination in New York City and was impressed by him. With Eliza's permission, the Willistons ensured that Day received a liberal education. He also learned printing skills from Mr. Williston, an ink manufacturer. The Willistons were known for helping people escape enslavement by employing them or assisting their travel along the Underground Railroad.

== Education ==
Day attended the New York Manumission Society school and then at age 9 entered public school No 2 in New York and was the librarian for the Garrison Literary Society. Beginning 1843, Day attended Oberlin College and he graduated with a bachelor's and master's degree. (Note: He was denied admission to Williams College due to his ethnicity.) He put himself through college by working as a compositor and a printer. He graduated in 1847, the only black graduate in a class of 50 students. Being an African-American man with advanced degrees created a challenge for Day to find ways to be successful in 19th-century America. The Livingstone College led by Rev. Joseph C. Price awarded Day an honorary D.D. at its commencement in May 1887.

== Career ==
=== Publisher, printer, and editor ===
His first job was as a compositor and printer. After he graduated from Oberlin, he was made shop foreman, overseeing the work of white men.

Day was editor of one of the first weekly African-American newspapers, The Aliened American. Published in Cleveland, Ohio, Day used the newspaper to support the abolitionist cause, as in this excerpt from April 9, 1853: "We speak for Humanity. If Humanity be a unit, wherever it is cloven down, wherever rights common to human beings are infringed, there we do sympathize." In Cleveland, he also was compositor to the Cleveland True Democrat published by Thomas Brown and edited by John C. Vaughen, for a year when he was promoted to mailing clerk and local editor. In 1866, he was appointed editor of the secular department of Zion's Standard and Weekly Review, a New York City Paper owned by the AME Zion church edited by Singleton T. Jones. In 1870, he became editor of Our National Progress.

=== Educator ===
While in Cleveland, he also taught school, teaching many subjects including Latin, Greek, mathematics, rhetoric, logic, music and vocal music, short-hand, and writing. In 1857, he went to Canada to recover from an illness and continued teaching fugitive slaves there. In 1867, he moved to Baltimore at the invitation of Edgar M. Gregory where he became inspector-general for schools there, a charge of 140 schools, 150 teachers and 7,000 students.

=== Civil rights and supporting organizations ===
He dedicated his life to the rights of Blacks in the United States. In 1848 he was in Cleveland where he became the secretary of the National Negro Convention.

In 1858, Day was elected president of the National Board of Commissioners of the Colored People by the Black citizens of Canada and the United States. Day was also active in the cause of the civil rights of the northern black minority. In 1858, he and his wife Lucy challenged racial segregation in public transportation in Michigan. In the 1858 case Day v. Owen, the Republican-dominated Michigan Supreme Court ruled against him and upheld segregation. The same year, he was a member of the Chatham Vigilance Committee that sought to prevent former slaves from being returned to the United States and brought back into slavery, such as the case of the Sylvanus Demarest.

In 1859 he visited England, Ireland, and Scotland with William King to raise money for a church and school house at Elgia in Buxton, Ontario. He met Martin Delany and Professor Campbell of the Institute for Colored Youth in London, and together the group founded the African Aid Society. He remained in Great Britain during the American Civil War (1861–1865). Back in the United States he attached himself to the Freedmen's Bureau.

After working in Baltimore as inspector-general of the schools, Day moved to Wilmington, Delaware, in 1869 to register African-American voters, a hazardous assignment given the tensions of the time period.

=== Orator ===
On July 4, 1865, Day spoke before a crowd of 10,000 men and women who had been emancipated. They gathered on the White House's back lawn, where they heard him say: "We meet to celebrate new hopes, new prospects, new joys and in view of the nation." Day's biographer Todd Mealy likens the momentous speech to Martin Luther King Jr.'s "I Have a Dream" speech of 1963, which was the 100th anniversary of the Emancipation Proclamation. He also considers the gathering of people to hear Day to be the first civil rights march on Washington.

=== Later career ===
In 1872, he returned north and became clerk in the corporation department of the auditor-general of Pennsylvania. In 1875, he succeeded James A. Jones as Secretary of the General Conference of the AME Zion church, and he was re-elected in 1876. In 1878 he was elected to the school board of directors at Harrisburg, Pennsylvania, serving for three years and holding the position of secretary to the committee on teachers. He was reelected in 1881 and did not stand for a third reelection in 1884. In 1887 he stood again and was again elected to the board.

== Personal life ==
On November 25, 1852, Day married Lucy Stanton, an 1846 graduate of Oberlin College. In 1858 their only child was born, Florence Day. In 1858, Day abandoned his wife and child. Day and Lucy Stanton were legally divorced in 1872. In 1873, Day married Georgia F. Bell.

Day died in Harrisburg, Pennsylvania, on December 3, 1900, at the age of 75. His resting place is Lincoln Cemetery in Harrisburg.

== Legacy ==
- The William Howard Day Cemetery was established in Steelton in the 1900s as a burial place for all people, including people of color who were denied burial at the nearby Baldwin Cemetery. It remains a popular burial site for local African-American families.
- The William Howard Day School in the City of Harrisburg was named for him.
- The William Howard Day homes, a public-housing community located at Reilly Road and Herr Street in Harrisburg.
