= Harrisburg, Pennsylvania =

Capital city of Pennsylvania, United States

Harrisburg Harrisbarrig (Pennsylvania German)
- State capital
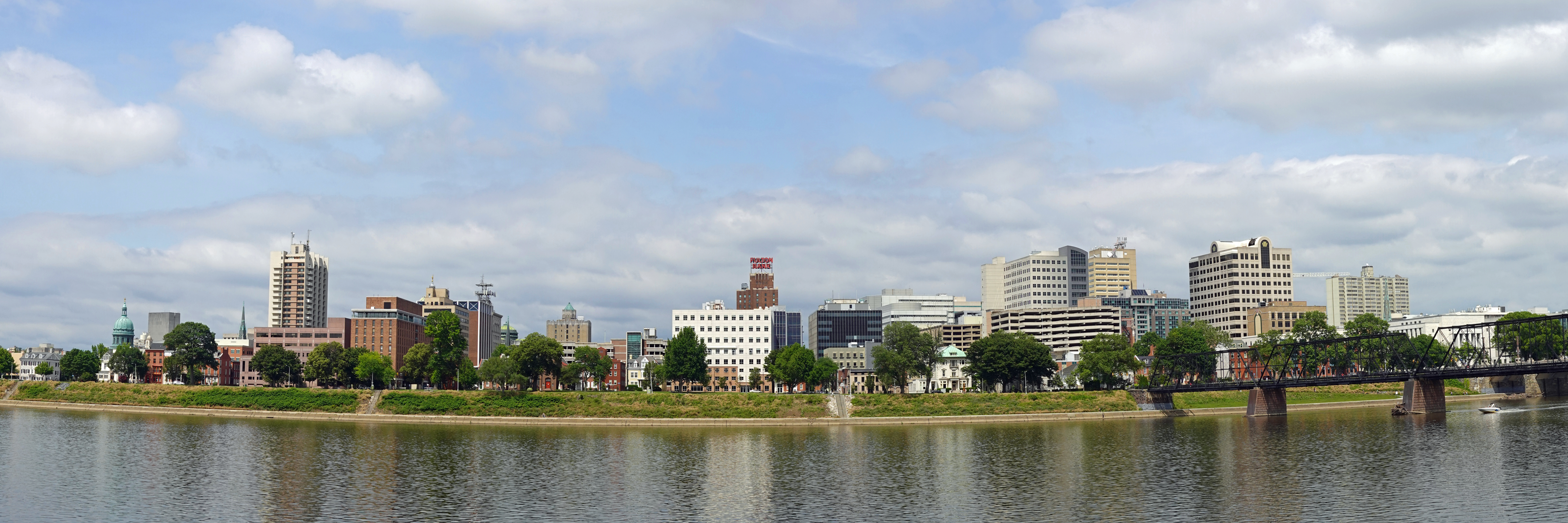
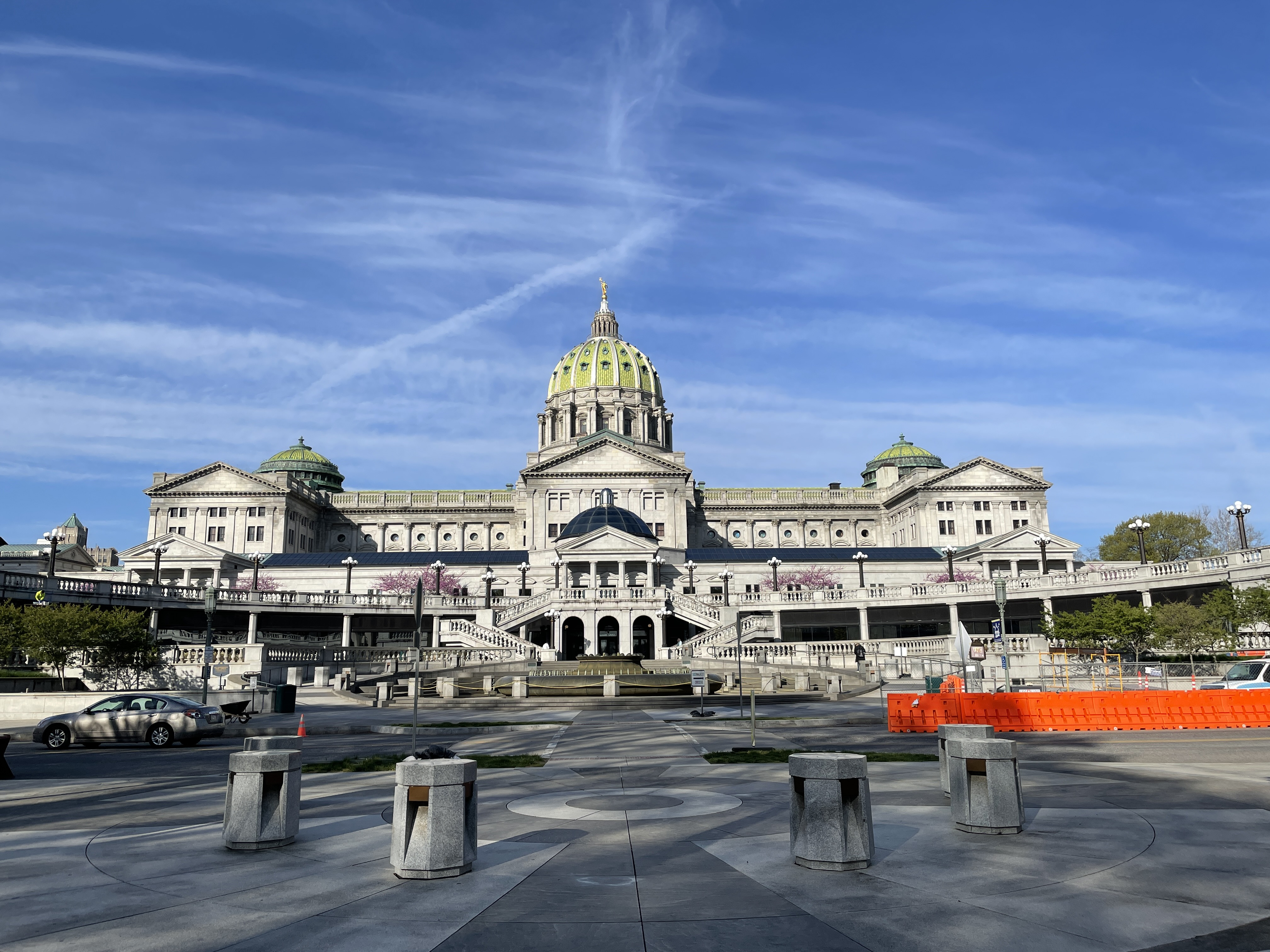
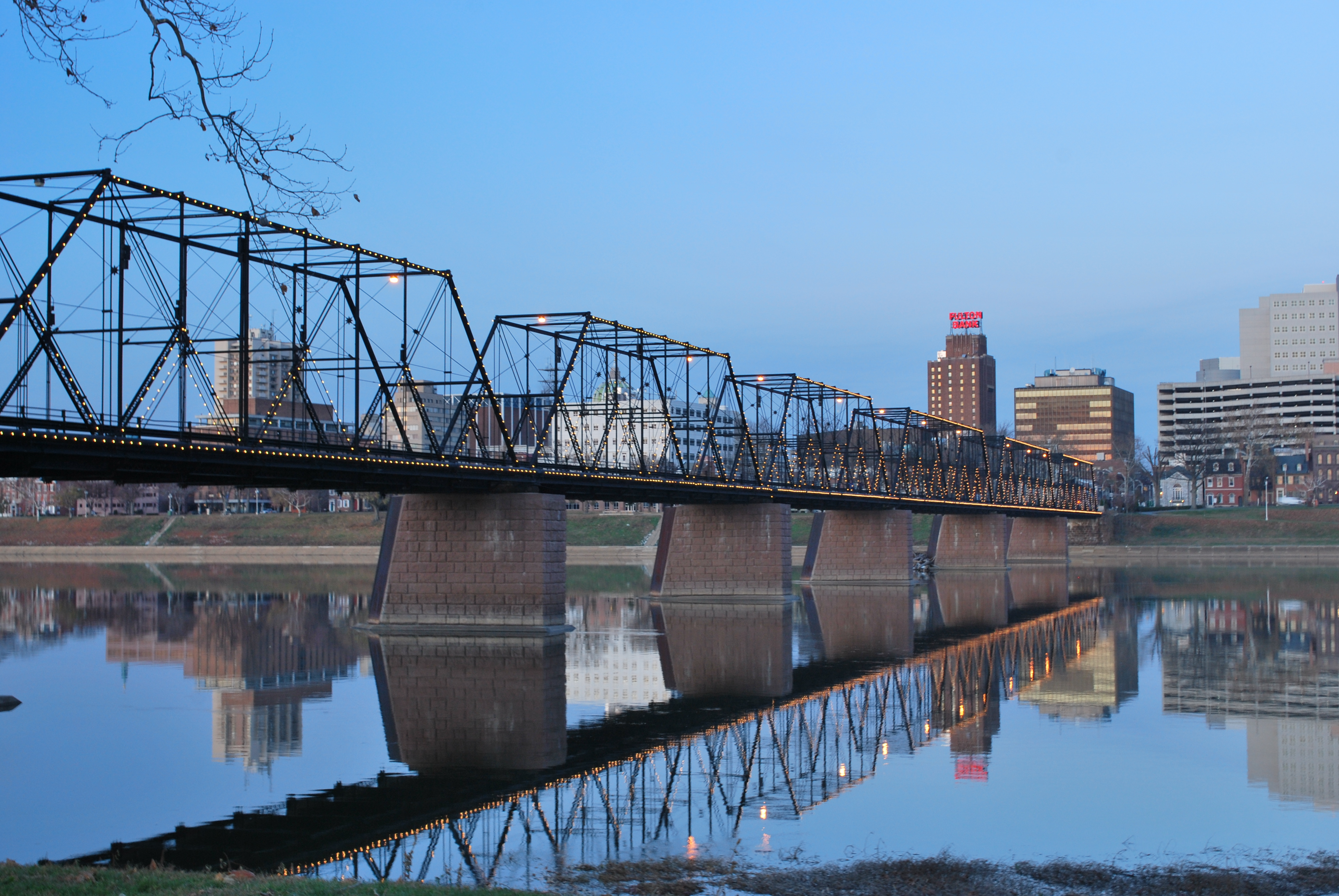
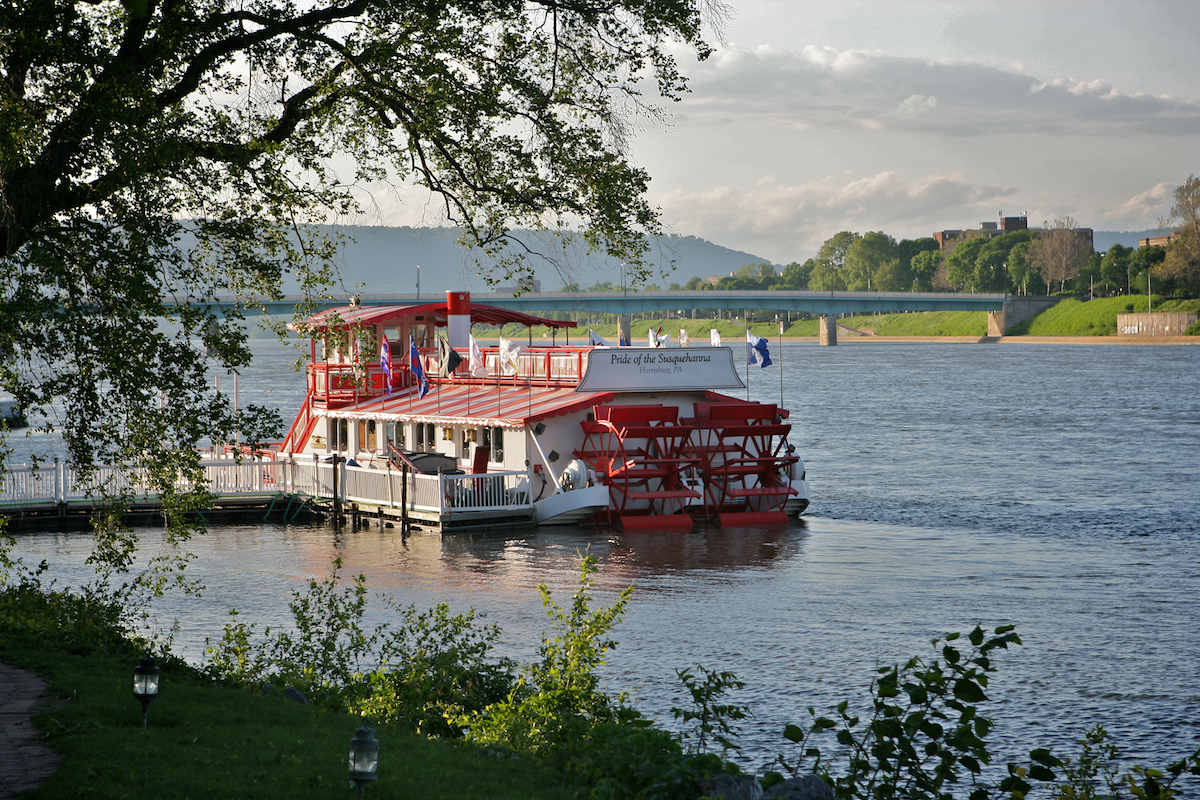
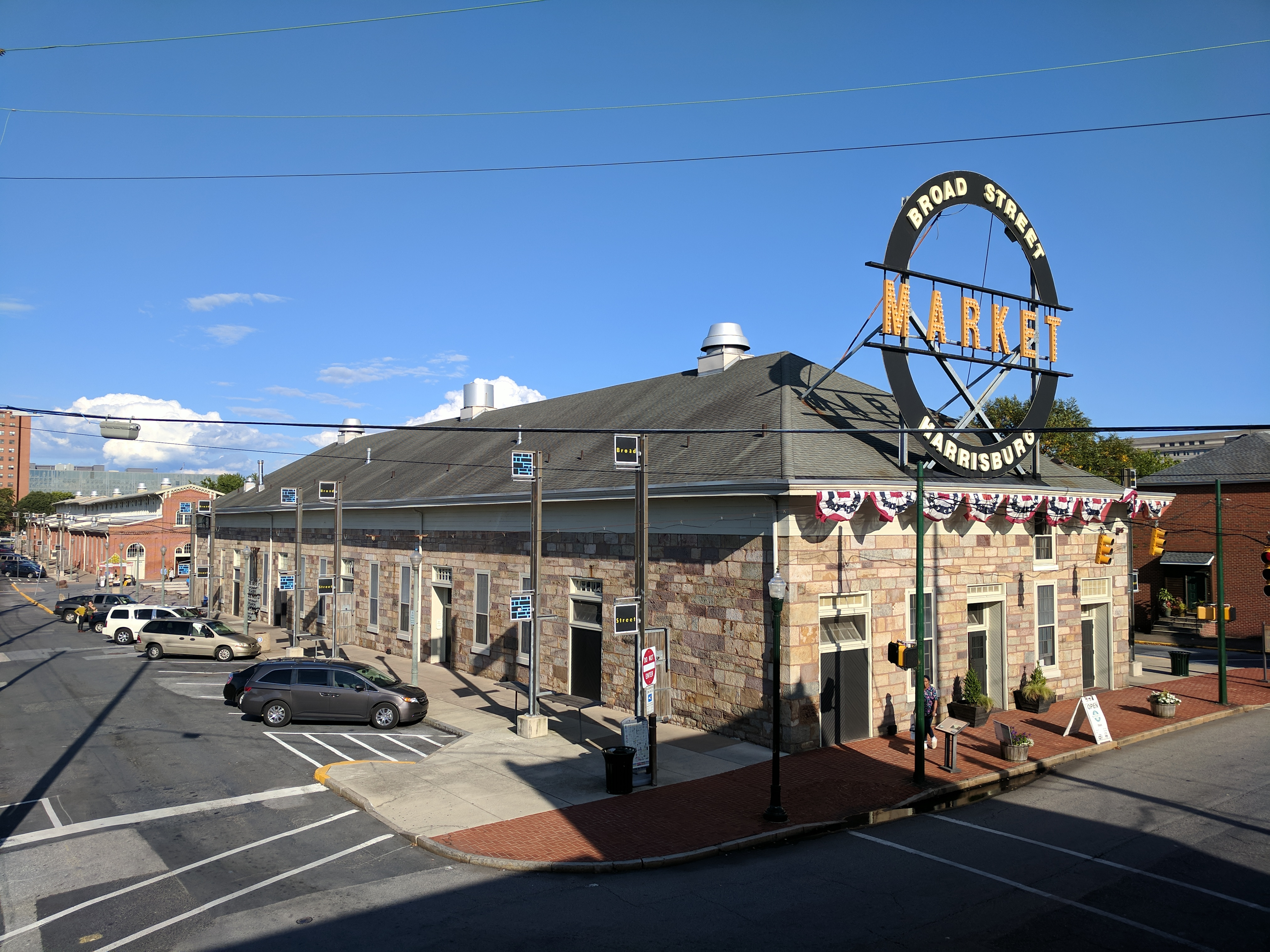
- Harrisburg skyline Pennsylvania State Capitol Walnut Street Bridge Pride of the Susquehanna Broad Street Market

- Flag Seal Official Logo
- Nickname(s): "The Burg", "The Other Burg"
- Interactive map of Harrisburg
- Location within Pennsylvania Location within the United States
- Coordinates: 40°16′11″N 76°52′32″W
- Country: United States
- State: Pennsylvania
- County: Dauphin
- European settlement: c. 1719; 307 years ago
- Incorporated: 1791; 235 years ago
- Charter: March 19, 1860; 166 years ago
- Founder: John Harris, Jr.
- Named for: John Harris, Sr.

Government
  - Type: Mayor-Council
  - Mayor: Wanda Williams (D)
  - City Controller: Charlie DeBrunner (D)
  - City Council: Council Members: Danielle Bowers (President); Ausha Green (Vice President); Shamaine A. Daniels, Esq.; Crystal Davis; Jocelyn Rawls; Lamont Jones; Ralph Rodriguez
  - State Senate: Patty Kim (D)
  - State Representative: Nate Davidson (D)

Area
  - City: 11.86 sq mi (30.73 km^{2})
  - Land: 8.12 sq mi (21.03 km^{2})
  - Water: 3.75 sq mi (9.70 km^{2})
  - Urban: 259.7 sq mi (672.6 km^{2})
- Elevation: 335 ft (102 m)

Population (2020)
  - City: 50,099
  - Estimate (2024): 50,649
  - Density: 6,174.5/sq mi (2,383.98/km^{2})
  - Urban: 490,859 (US: 86th)
  - Urban density: 1,961.5/sq mi (757.3/km^{2})
  - Metro: 615,361 (US: 94th)
  - CSA: 1,295,259 (US: 46th)
- Demonym(s): Harrisburger, Harrisburgian
- Time zone: UTC−5 (EST)
  - Summer (DST): UTC−4 (EDT)
- ZIP Codes: 17101-17113, 17120-17130, 17140, 17177
- Area code: 717 and 223
- FIPS code: 42–32800
- GNIS feature ID: 1213649
- Interstates: I-76/Penna. Turnpike, I-81, I-83 and I-283
- Waterways: Susquehanna River
- Primary Airport: Harrisburg International Airport- MDT (Major/International)
- Secondary Airport: Capital City Airport- CXY (Minor)
- Public transit: Capital Area Transit
- Website: harrisburgpa.gov

Pennsylvania Historical Marker
- Designated: September 23, 1946

Harrisburg (/ˈhærɪsbɜːrɡ/ HARR-iss-burg; Pennsylvania German: Harrisbarrig) is the capital city of the U.S. commonwealth of Pennsylvania. It is the ninth-most populous city in the state, with a population of 50,099 at the 2020 census, while the Harrisburg–Carlisle metropolitan statistical area has an estimated 615,000 residents and is the fourth-most populous metropolitan area in Pennsylvania. Harrisburg is situated on the east bank of the Susquehanna River 83 miles (134 km) southwest of Allentown and 108 miles (174 km) northwest of Philadelphia. It is officially incorporated as a third-class city and is the county seat of Dauphin County.

Harrisburg played a role in American history during the Westward Migration, the American Civil War, and the Industrial Revolution. During part of the 19th century, the building of the Pennsylvania Canal and later the Pennsylvania Railroad allowed Harrisburg to develop into one of the most industrialized cities in the Northeastern United States. In the mid- to late 20th century, the city's economic fortunes fluctuated with its major industries consisting of government, heavy manufacturing, agriculture, and food services. These economic fluctuations contributed to Harrisburg experiencing a decline of nearly half its population between 1950 and 2000. However, the region is seen as financially stable in part due to the high concentration of state and federal government agencies.

The Pennsylvania Farm Show, the largest indoor agriculture exposition in the U.S., was first held in Harrisburg in 1917 and has been held there annually in early to mid–January since. The city also hosts the annual Great American Outdoor Show, the largest of its kind in the world, among many other events. Harrisburg experienced the Three Mile Island accident on March 28, 1979, in nearby Middletown.

== History ==
=== Founding ===
Harrisburg's site along the Susquehanna River is thought to have been inhabited by Native Americans as early as 3000 BC. Known to the Native Americans as "Peixtin", or "Paxtang", the area was an important resting place and crossroads for Native American traders with trails leading from the Delaware to the Ohio rivers and from the Potomac to the Upper Susquehanna intersecting there.

=== 17th century ===
The first European contact with Native Americans in Pennsylvania was made by Englishman Captain John Smith, who journeyed from Virginia up the Susquehanna River in 1608 and visited with the Susquehanna tribe.

=== 18th century ===
In 1719, John Harris, Sr., an English trader, settled here; 14 years later, he secured grants of 800 acres (3.2 km^{2}) in this vicinity. In 1785, John Harris, Jr. made plans to lay out a town on his father's land, which he named Harrisburg. In the spring of 1785, the town was formally surveyed by William Maclay, who was a son-in-law of John Harris, Sr. In 1791, Harrisburg became incorporated.

=== 19th century ===
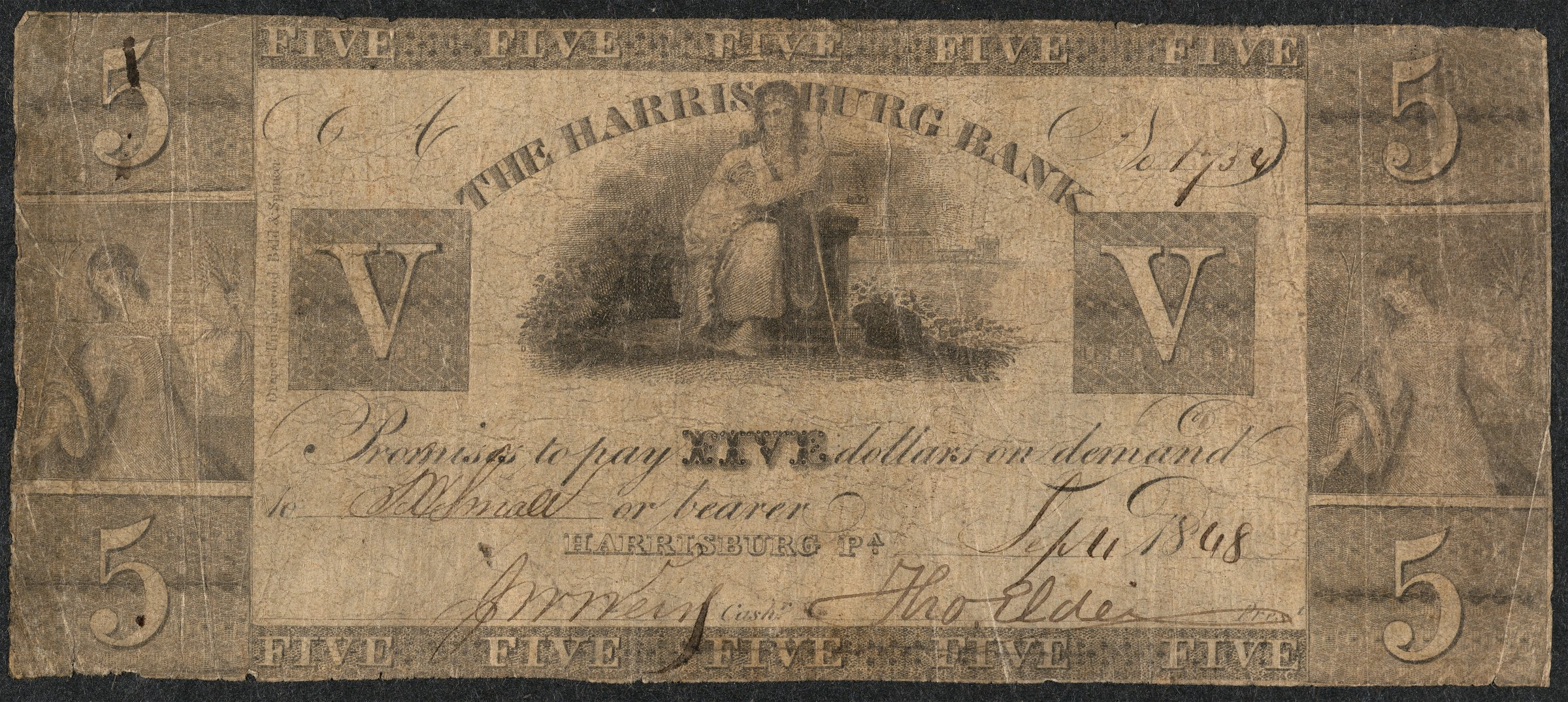
An 1848 Bank of Harrisburg five-dollar bill

In October 1812 Harrisburg was named the Pennsylvania state capital, which it has remained ever since. The assembling here of the highly sectional Harrisburg Convention in 1827 (signaling what may have been the birth of lobbying on a national scale) led to the passage of the high protective-tariff bill of 1828.

In 1839, William Henry Harrison and John Tyler were nominated for president and Vice President of the United States at the first national convention of the Whig Party of the United States, which was held in Harrisburg. Before Harrisburg gained its first industries, it was a scenic, pastoral town: compact and surrounded by farmland. In 1822, the impressive brick capitol was completed for $200,000 (~$6.1 million in 2025).

Harrisburg's strategic location gave it an advantage over many other towns; it was settled as a trading post in 1719 at a location important to westward expansion, past the Blue Mountain range. The Susquehanna River flowed generally west to east at this location, providing a route for boat traffic from the east. The head of navigation was a short distance northwest of the town, where the river flowed through the pass. Persons arriving from the east by boat had to exit at Harrisburg and prepare for an overland journey westward through the mountain pass. Harrisburg assumed importance as a provisioning stop at this point where westward bound pioneers transitioned from river travel to overland travel. It was partly because of its strategic location that the state legislature selected the small town of Harrisburg to become the state capital in 1812.

The grandeur of the Colonial Revival capitol dominated the quaint town. The streets were dirt, but orderly and platted in grid pattern. The Pennsylvania Canal was built in 1834 and coursed the length of the town. The residential houses were situated on only a few city blocks stretching southward from the capitol. They were mostly one story. No factories were present but there were blacksmith shops and other businesses. The ownership of land concentrated in the hands of a small number of wealthy families: five people held one-third of private land in 1850.

During the first part of the 19th century, Harrisburg was a notable stopping place along the Underground Railroad, as persons escaping slavery used the Susquehanna River to access food and supplies before heading north towards Canada.

During the American Civil War, Harrisburg became a significant training center for the Union army, with tens of thousands of troops passing through Camp Curtin, which was established on April 18, 1861 and named in honor of Pennsylvania's Civil War-era governor, Andrew Gregg Curtin.

Harrisburg functioned as a major rail center for the Union and a vital link between the Atlantic coast and the Midwest, with several railroads running through the city and spanning the Susquehanna River. As a result of this importance, the city was targeted by General Robert E. Lee's Army of Northern Virginia during the army's two invasions. First, during the 1862 Maryland Campaign, when Lee planned to capture the city after taking Harpers Ferry, West Virginia, but was prevented from doing so by the Battle of Antietam and his subsequent retreat back into Virginia. The second attempt was made during the Gettysburg campaign in 1863 and was more substantial. Under orders from Gen. Robert E. Lee directly, Confederate Lt. Gen. Richard S. Ewell's Second Corps were tasked with capturing Harrisburg and disrupting the vital Union supply and rail lines. However, Ewell's forces were intercepted by the forces of the Department of the Susquehanna under the command of Union Maj. Gen. Darius N. Couch in a series of skirmishes surrounding the city, such as the Skirmish of Sporting Hill in Camp Hill, just 2 miles (3 km) west of Harrisburg. The Second Corp were ultimately unsuccessful in both overcoming the local Union defenses and crossing the rain bloated Susquehanna into Harrisburg itself, and were forced to retreat southward to regroup with Lee's main Confederate force. This attempt marked the northernmost advance of the Confederate Army during the Civil War.

On July 3, 1863, the artillery barrage that marked the beginning of Pickett's Charge of the Battle of Gettysburg was heard from Harrisburg, almost 40 miles away.

Harrisburg's importance in the latter half of the 19th century was in the steel industry. It was an important railroad center as well. Steel and iron became dominant industries. Steel and other industries continued to play a major role in the local economy throughout the latter part of the 19th century. The city was the center of enormous railroad traffic and its steel industry supported large furnaces, rolling mills, and machine shops. The Pennsylvania Steel Company plant, which opened in nearby Steelton in 1866, was the first in the country; later operated by Bethlehem Steel.

Its first large scale iron foundries were put into operation shortly after 1850. As industries nationwide entered a phase of great expansion and technological improvement, so did industries – and in particular the steel industry – in Harrisburg. This can be attributed to a combination of factors that were typical of what existed in other successful industrial cities: rapid rail expansion; nearby markets for goods; and nearby sources for raw product.

With Harrisburg poised for growth in steel production, Steelton became the ideal location for this type of industry. It was a wide swath of flat land located south of the city, with rail and canal access running its entire 4 mile length. There was plenty of room for houses and its own downtown section. Steelton was a company town, opened in 1866 by the Pennsylvania Steel Company. Highly innovative in its steel making process, it became the first mill in the United States to make steel railroad rails by contract. In its prime, Steelton was home to more than 16,000 residents from 33 different ethnic groups. All were employed in the steel industry, or had employment in services that supported it. In the late 19th century, no less than five major steel mills and foundries were located in Steelton. Each contained a maze of buildings; conveyances for moving the products; large yards for laying down equipment; and facilities for loading their product on trains. Stacks from these factories constantly belched smoke. With housing and a small downtown area within walking distance, these were the sights and smells that most Steelton residents saw every day.

The rail yard was another area of Harrisburg that saw rapid and thorough change during the years of industrialization. This was a wide expanse of about two dozen railroad tracks that grew from the single track of the early 1850s. By the late 19th century, this area was the width of about two city blocks and formed what amounted to a barrier along the eastern edge of the city: passable only by bridge. Three large and ornately embellished passenger depots were built by as many rail lines. Pennsylvania Railroad was the largest rail line in Harrisburg. It built huge repair facilities and two large roundhouses in the 1860s and 1870s to handle its enormous freight and passenger traffic and to maintain its colossal infrastructure. Its rails ran the length of Harrisburg, along its eastern border. It had a succession of three passenger depots, each built on the site of the predecessor, and each of high style architecture, including a train shed to protect passengers from inclement weather. At its peak in 1904, it made 100 passenger stops per day. It extended west to Pittsburgh, across the entire state, and east to Philadelphia, serving Steelton along the route. The anthracite coal mines in the Allegheny Mountains were reached by the Northern Central Railroad. The Lebanon Valley Railroad extended east to Philadelphia with spurs to New York City. Another rail line was the Philadelphia and Reading Railroad, which provided service to Philadelphia and other points east.

Allison Hill, Harrisburg's first suburb, is located east of the city on a prominent bluff, accessed by bridges across a wide swath of train tracks. It was developed in the late 19th century and offered affluent Harrisburg residents the opportunity to live in the suburbs only a few hundred yards from their jobs in the city. As the city expanded, it incorporated Allison Hill in its boundaries. In 1886, a single horse trolley line was established from the city to Allison Hill. Easy access was later achieved via the State Street Bridge leading east from the Capitol complex and the Market Street Bridge leading from the city's prominent business district. Among the most desirable sections of Allison Hill at the time was Mount Pleasant, which was characterized by large Colonial Revival-style houses with yards for the very wealthy and smaller but still well-built row houses lining the main street for the moderately wealthy. State Street, leading from the Capitol directly toward Allison Hill, was planned to provide a grand view of the Capitol dome for those approaching the city from Allison Hill. This trend towards outlying residential areas began slowly in the late 19th century and was largely confined to the trolley line, but the growing prevalence of automobile ownership quickened the trend and spread out the population in the 20th century.

=== 20th century ===
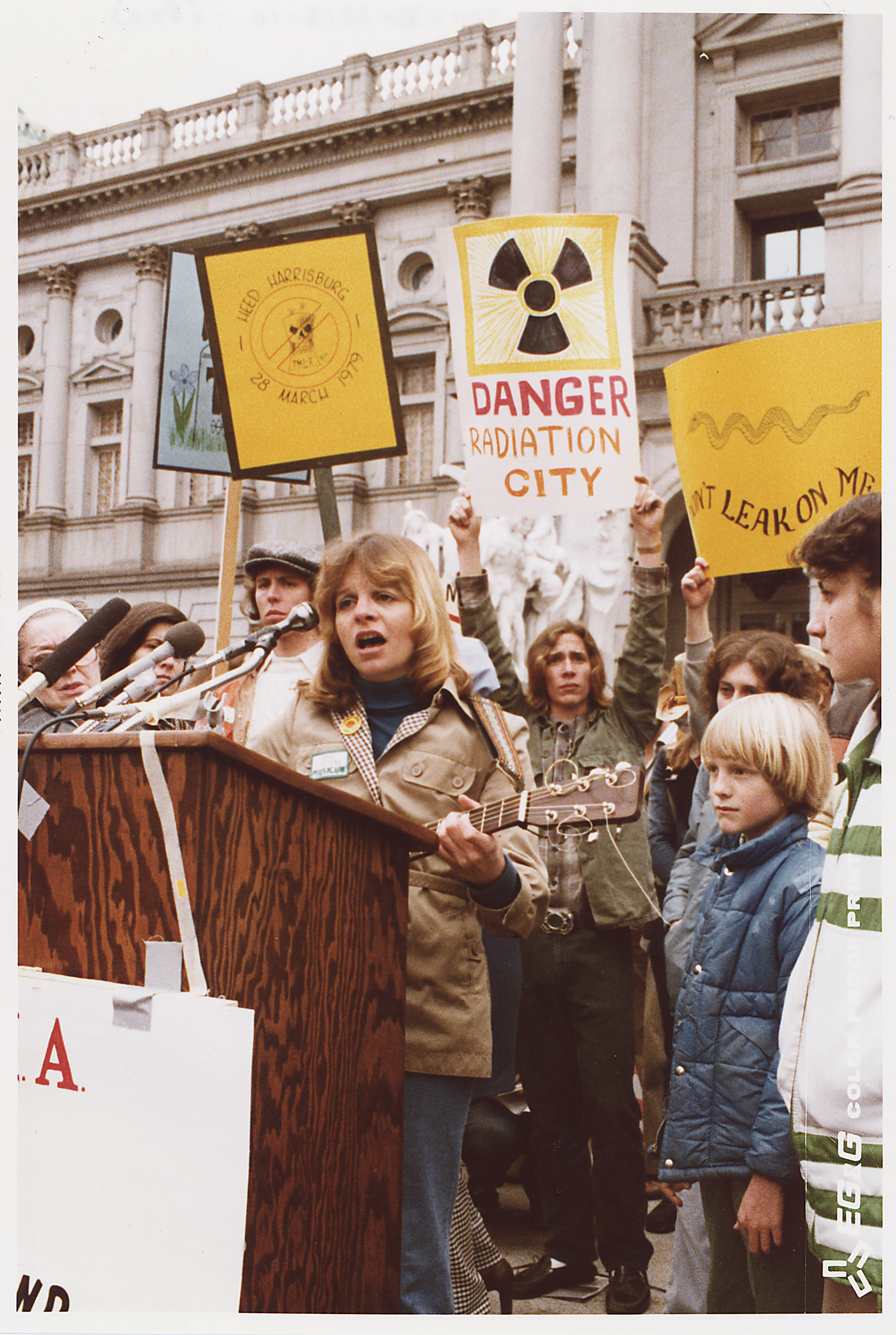
An anti-nuclear protest in Harrisburg in 1979, following the Three Mile Island accident

In the early 20th century, the city of Harrisburg was in need of change. Without proper sanitation, diseases such as typhoid began killing many citizens of Harrisburg. Seeing these necessary changes, several Harrisburg residents became involved in the City Beautiful movement. The project focused on providing better transportation, spaces for recreation, sanitation, landscaping, and parks for those living in cities, as research showed that a person with access to amenities would be a happier person. In December 1900, a reformer named Mira Lloyd Dock, who had recently encountered well-ordered urban centers on an international trip to Europe, gave a lecture on "The City Beautiful" to Harrisburg's Board of Trade. Other prominent citizens of the city such as J. Horace McFarland and Vance McCormick advocated urban improvements which were influenced by European urban planning design and the World's Columbian Exposition. Warren Manning was hired to help bring about these changes. Specifically, their efforts greatly enlarged the Harrisburg park system, creating Riverfront Park, Reservoir Park, the Italian Lake and Wildwood Park. In addition, plans were undertaken for new water filtration, burial of electric wires, the paving of roads, and the creation of a modern sanitary sewer system. The efforts to improve the city also paralleled the construction of an expanded monumental Capitol complex in 1906 which led, in turn, to the displacement of the Old Eighth Ward, one of the most ethnically and racially diverse communities in Harrisburg.

The decades between 1920 and 1970 were characterized by industrial decline and population shift from the city to the suburbs. Like most other cities which faced a loss of their industrial base, Harrisburg shifted to a service-oriented base, with industries such as health care and convention centers playing a big role. Harrisburg's greatest problem was a shrinking city population after 1950. This loss in population followed a national trend and was a delayed result of the decline of Harrisburg's steel industry. This decline began almost imperceptibly in the late 1880s, but did not become evident until the early 20th century.

After being held in place for about 5 years by WWII armament production, the population peaked shortly after the war, but then took a long-overdue dive as people fled from the city. Hastening the white flight to the suburbs were the cheap and available houses being built away from the crime and deteriorating situation of the city. The reduction in city population coincided with the rise in population of the Metropolitan Statistical Area. The trend continued until the 1990s.

The Pennsylvania Farm Show, the largest indoor agriculture exposition in the United States, was first held in 1917 and has been held every January since then. The present location of the Show is the Pennsylvania Farm Show Complex & Expo Center, located at the corner of Maclay and Cameron streets.

On Wednesday, March 28, 1979, the Three Mile Island nuclear plant, along the Susquehanna River located in Londonderry Township which is south of Harrisburg, suffered a partial meltdown. Although it was contained and radiation leakages were minimal, there were still worries that an evacuation would be necessary. Governor Dick Thornburgh, on the advice of Nuclear Regulatory Commission Chairman Joseph Hendrie, advised the evacuation "of pregnant women and pre-school age children ... within a five-mile (8 km) radius of the Three Mile Island facility." Within days, 140,000 people had left the area.

Stephen R. Reed was elected mayor in 1981 and served until 2009, making him the city's longest-serving mayor. In an effort to end the city's long period of economic troubles, he initiated several projects to attract new business and tourism to the city. Several museums and hotels such as Whitaker Center for Science and the Arts, the National Civil War Museum and the Hilton Harrisburg and Towers were built during his term, along with many office buildings and residential structures. Several minor league professional sports franchises, including the Harrisburg Senators of the Eastern League, the Harrisburg Heat indoor soccer club, and Penn FC of the United Soccer League began operations in the city during his tenure as mayor. While praised for the vast number of economic improvements, Reed has also been criticized for population loss and mounting debt. For example, during a budget crisis the city was forced to sell $8 million worth of Western and American-Indian artifacts collected by Mayor Reed for a never-realized museum celebrating the American West.

=== 21st century ===
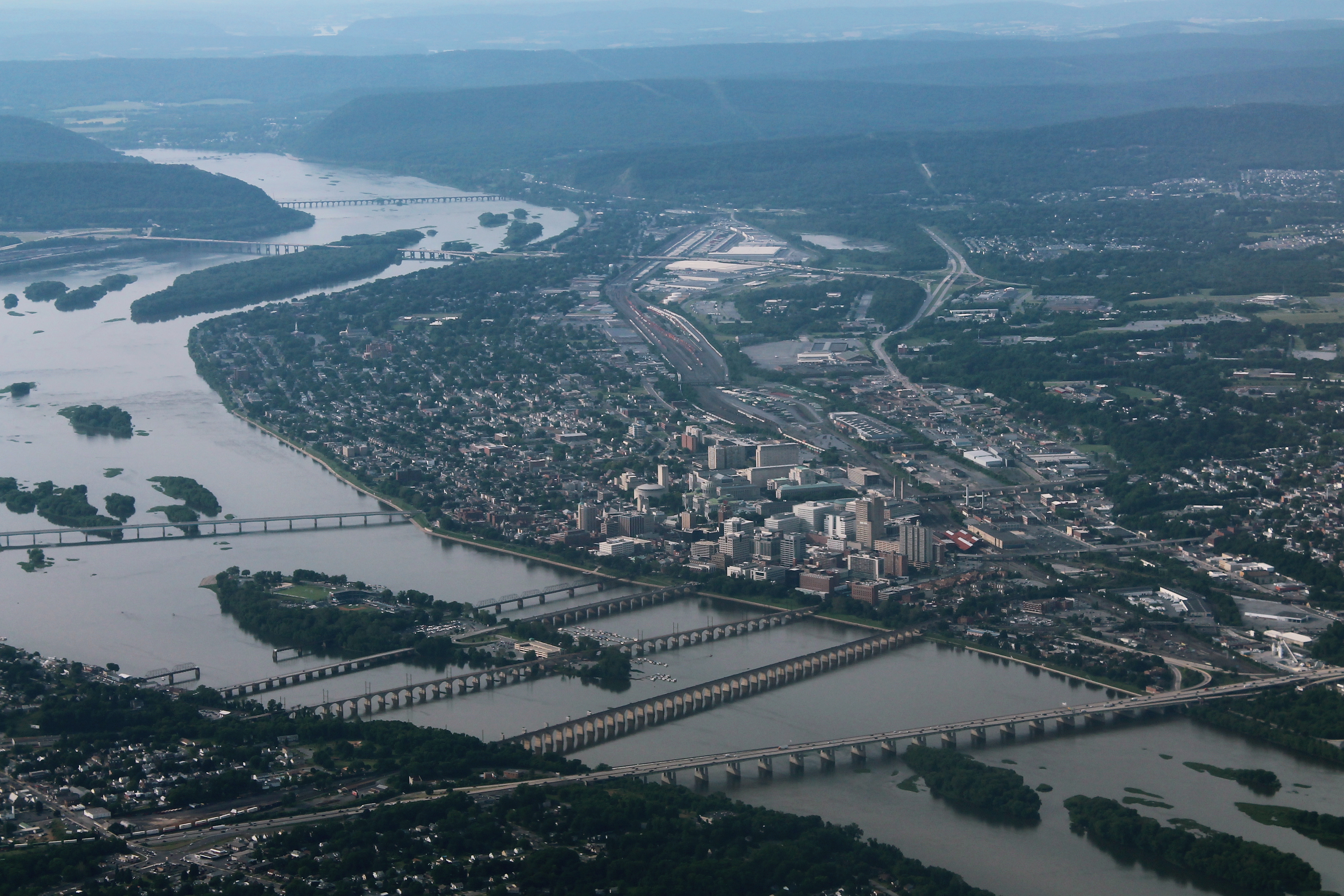
Harrisburg and the Susquehanna River (Pictured June 10, 2016)

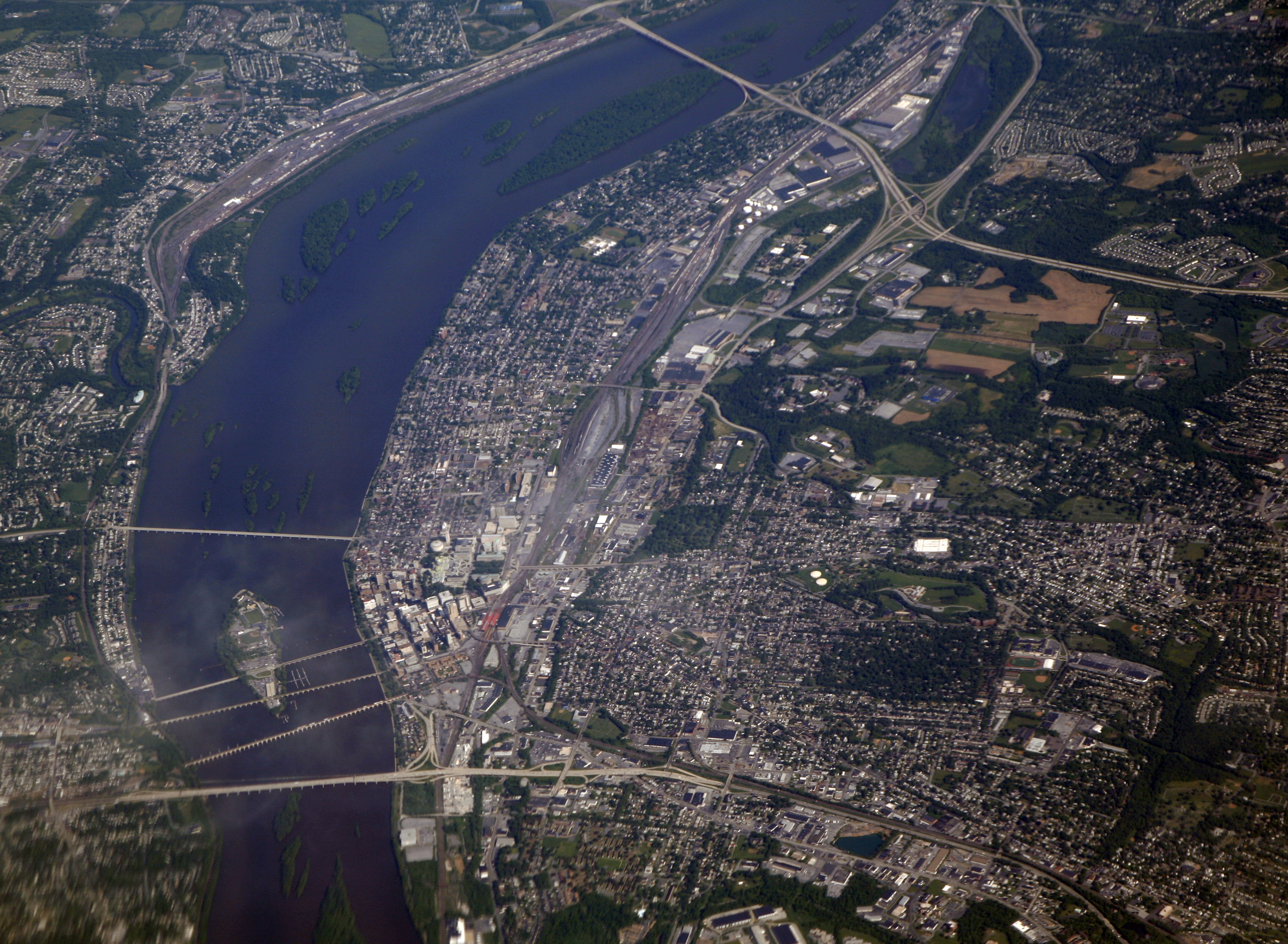
An aerial view of Harrisburg

During the nearly 30-year tenure of former Mayor Stephen Reed from 1981 to 2009, city officials ignored legal restraints on the use of bond proceeds, as Reed spent the money pursuing interests including collecting Civil War and Wild West memorabilia – some of which was found in Reed's home after his arrest on corruption charges. Infrastructure was left unrepaired, and the heart of the city's financial woes was a trash-to-electricity plant, the Harrisburg incinerator, which was supposed to generate income but instead, because of increased borrowing, incurred a debt of $320 million.

Missing audits and convoluted transactions, including swap agreements, make it difficult to state how much debt the city owes. Some estimates put total debt over $1.5 billion, which would mean that every resident would owe $30,285. These numbers do not reflect the school system deficit, the school district's $437 million long-term debt, nor unfunded pension and healthcare obligations.

Harrisburg was the first municipality ever in the history of the U.S. Securities and Exchange Commission to be charged with securities fraud, for misleading statements about its financial health. The city agreed to a plea bargain to settle the case.

In October 2011, Harrisburg filed for Chapter 9 bankruptcy when four members of the seven-member City Council voted to file a bankruptcy petition to prevent the Pennsylvania State Government from taking over the city's finances. Bankruptcy Judge Mary France dismissed the petition on the grounds that the City Council majority had filed it over the objection of Mayor Linda Thompson, reasoning that the filing not only required the mayor's approval but had circumvented state laws concerning financially distressed cities.

Instead, a state-appointed receiver took charge of the city's finances. Governor Tom Corbett appointed bond attorney David Unkovic as the city's receiver, but Unkovic resigned after only four months. Unkovic blamed disdain for legal restraints on contracts and debt for creating Harrisburg's intractable financial problem and said the corrupt influence of creditors and political cronies prevented fixing it.

As creditors began to file lawsuits to seize and sell off city assets, a new receiver, William B. Lynch, was appointed. The City Council opposed the new receiver's plans for tax increases and advocated a stay of the creditor lawsuits with a bankruptcy filing, while Mayor Thompson continued to oppose bankruptcy. State legislators crafted a moratorium to prevent Harrisburg from declaring bankruptcy, and after the moratorium expired, the law stripped the city government of the authority to file for bankruptcy and conferred it on the state receiver.

After two years of negotiations, in August 2013 Receiver Lynch revealed his comprehensive voluntary plan for resolving Harrisburg's fiscal problems. The complex plan called for creditors to write down or postpone some debt. To pay the remainder, Harrisburg sold the troubled incinerator, leased its parking garages for 40 years, and was to briefly go further into debt by issuing new bonds. Receiver Lynch had also called for setting up nonprofit investment corporations to oversee infrastructure improvement, repairing the city's crumbling roads and water and sewer lines, and pensions and economic development. These were intended to allow nonprofit fundraising and to reduce the likelihood of mismanagement by the city government.

Harrisburg's City Council and the state Commonwealth Court approved the plan, and became implemented. The city balanced its budget in the late 2010s, was expected to have a surplus of $1 million in 2019, and maintained a surplus in 2020 despite the COVID-19 pandemic.

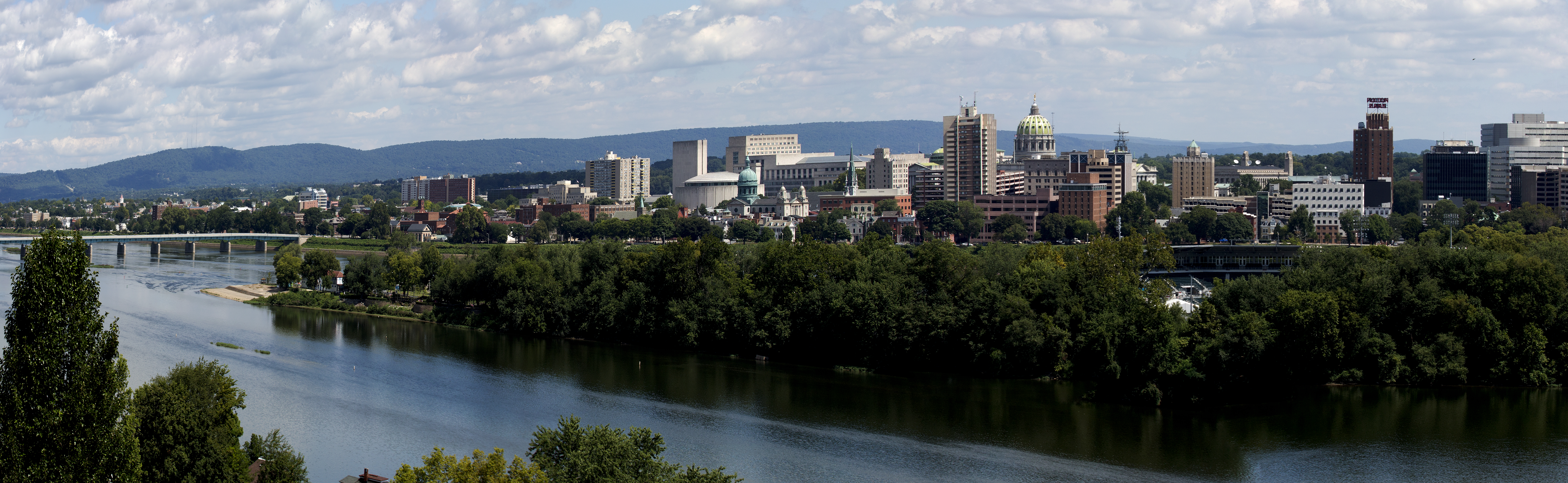
Downtown Harrisburg with City Island in the foreground as seen from the West Shore of the Susquehanna River in August 2015

== Geography ==
=== Topography ===
The Susquehanna River cuts through the ridges of the Appalachian Mountains just north of Harrisburg, PA

Harrisburg is located at 40°16′11″N 76°52′32″W (40.269789, −76.875613) in South Central Pennsylvania, within a two-hour drive of the metro areas of Baltimore, Washington, D.C., Philadelphia and three-hour drive of New York City and Pittsburgh. According to the United States Census Bureau, the city has a total area of 11.4 square miles (30 km^{2}), of which 8.1 square miles (21 km^{2}) is land and 3.3 square miles (8.5 km^{2}) (29.11%) is water. Bodies of water include Paxton Creek, which empties into the Susquehanna River at Harrisburg, as well as Wildwood Lake and Italian Lake parks. In land area Harrisburg (proper) is also the third smallest of the United States capital cities.

Directly to the north of Harrisburg is the Blue Mountain ridge of the Appalachian Mountains. The Cumberland Valley lies directly to the west of Harrisburg and the Susquehanna River, stretching into northern Maryland. The fertile Lebanon Valley lies to the east. Harrisburg is the northern fringe of the historic Pennsylvania Dutch Country.

The city is the county seat of Dauphin County. The adjacent counties are Northumberland County to the north; Schuylkill County to the northeast; Lebanon County to the east; Lancaster County to the south; and York County to the southwest; Cumberland County to the west; and Perry County to the northwest.

=== Adjacent municipalities ===
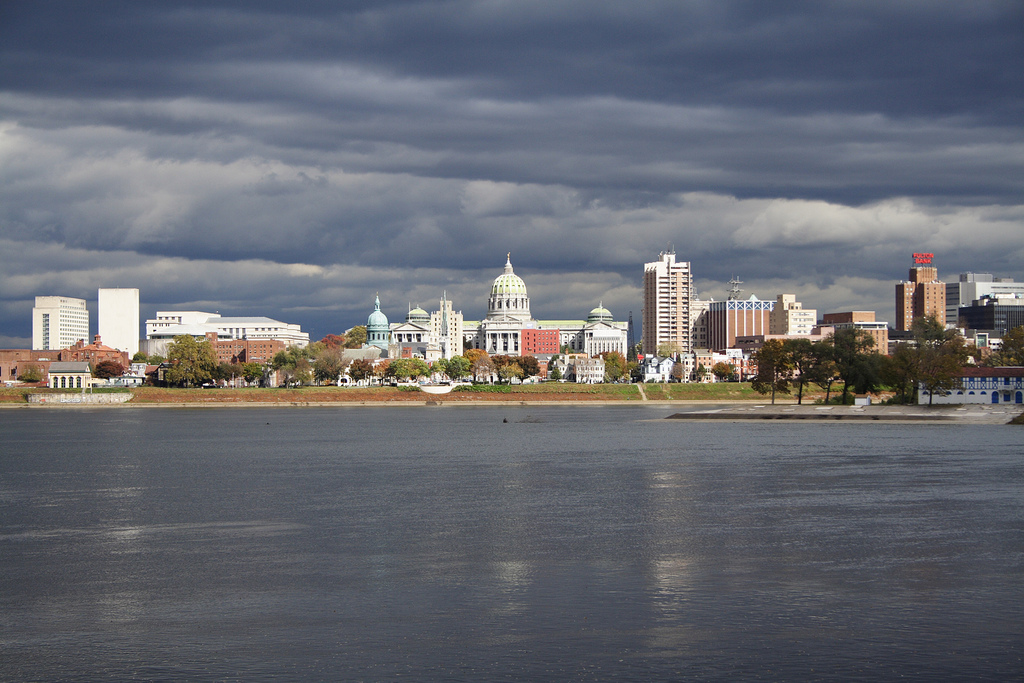
The Pennsylvania State Capitol seen from across the Susquehanna River in Wormleysburg

Harrisburg's western boundary is formed by the west shore of the Susquehanna River, which runs within the city boundaries and serves as the boundary between Dauphin and Cumberland counties. Harrisburg is divided into numerous neighborhoods and districts. Like many of Pennsylvania's cities and boroughs that are at build-out stage, there are several townships outside of Harrisburg city limits that, although autonomous, use the name Harrisburg for postal and name-place designation. They include the townships of: Lower Paxton, Middle Paxton, Susquehanna, Swatara and West Hanover in Dauphin County. The borough of Penbrook, located just east of Reservoir Park, was previously known as East Harrisburg. Penbrook, along with the borough of Paxtang, also located just outside the city limits, maintain Harrisburg ZIP codes as well. The United States Postal Service designates 26 ZIP Codes for Harrisburg, including 13 for official use by federal and state government agencies.

- Dauphin County
  - Lower Paxton Township (east)
  - Penbrook (northeast)
  - Paxtang (east)
  - Susquehanna Township (northeast)
  - Swatara Township (southeast)
- Cumberland County
  - East Pennsboro Township (west)
  - Lemoyne (west)
  - New Cumberland (southwest)
  - Wormleysburg (west)

=== Climate ===
Climate chart for Harrisburg

Harrisburg has a variable, four-season climate lying at the beginning of the transition between the humid subtropical and humid continental zones (Köppen Cfa and Dfa, respectively). The city limits fall within the Cfa Humid subtropical climate classification, while the suburban areas and rural surroundings fall just into the Dfa Humid continental climate classification. The hottest month of the year is July, with a daily mean temperature of 77.5 °F (25.3 °C). Summer is usually hot and humid and occasional heat waves can occur. The city averages around 32 days per year with 90 °F (32 °C)+ highs, although temperatures reaching 100 °F (38 °C) are rare. Seven months average above 50 °F (10 °C) and three months average above 22 °C (72 °F). The hottest temperature ever recorded in Harrisburg is 107 °F (42 °C) on July 3, 1966. Summer thunderstorms also occur relatively frequently. Autumn is a pleasant season, when the humidity and temperatures fall to more comfortable values. The hardiness zone is 7a/7b.

Winter in Harrisburg is mild to cool: January, the coolest month, remains above freezing, as it experiences a daily mean temperature of 32.6 °F (0.3 °C). A major snowstorm can also occasionally occur, and some winters snowfall totals can exceed 40 inches (102 cm), while in other winters, the region may receive very little snowfall. Snow that does fall often melts away quickly. The largest snowfall on a single calendar day was 26.4 in (67 cm) on January 23, 2016, recorded at Harrisburg International Airport in Middletown, while the snowiest month on record was February 2010, with 42.1 in (107 cm), recorded at the same location. Overall, Harrisburg receives an average of 29.9 in (75.9 cm) of snow per winter. The coldest temperature ever recorded in Harrisburg was −22 °F (−30 °C) on January 21, 1994. Spring is also a pleasant time of year for outdoor activities. Precipitation is well-distributed and generous in most months, though July is clearly the wettest and February the driest.

Climate data for Harrisburg, Pennsylvania (Harrisburg Int'l), 1991–2020 normals, (Note: Mean monthly maxima and minima (i.e. the highest and lowest temperature readings during an entire month or year) calculated based on data at said location from 1981 to 2010.) extremes 1888–present (Note: Official records for Harrisburg kept at downtown from July 1888 to December 1938, Capital City Airport from January 1939 to September 1991, and at Harrisburg Int'l in Middletown since October 1991.)
Month	Jan	Feb	Mar	Apr	May	Jun	Jul	Aug	Sep	Oct	Nov	Dec	Year
Record high °F (°C)	73 (23)	79 (26)	87 (31)	93 (34)	97 (36)	100 (38)	107 (42)	104 (40)	102 (39)	97 (36)	84 (29)	75 (24)	107 (42)
Mean maximum °F (°C)	59.3 (15.2)	61.4 (16.3)	72.7 (22.6)	83.5 (28.6)	89.5 (31.9)	93.3 (34.1)	96.2 (35.7)	93.8 (34.3)	89.7 (32.1)	81.1 (27.3)	70.8 (21.6)	62.3 (16.8)	97.0 (36.1)
Mean daily maximum °F (°C)	38.6 (3.7)	42.0 (5.6)	51.3 (10.7)	63.8 (17.7)	73.7 (23.2)	82.4 (28.0)	86.8 (30.4)	84.7 (29.3)	77.6 (25.3)	65.7 (18.7)	53.9 (12.2)	43.3 (6.3)	63.6 (17.6)
Daily mean °F (°C)	30.8 (−0.7)	33.4 (0.8)	41.8 (5.4)	53.2 (11.8)	63.4 (17.4)	72.5 (22.5)	77.3 (25.2)	75.2 (24.0)	67.9 (19.9)	55.8 (13.2)	44.8 (7.1)	35.8 (2.1)	54.3 (12.4)
Mean daily minimum °F (°C)	23.0 (−5.0)	24.7 (−4.1)	32.3 (0.2)	42.5 (5.8)	53.1 (11.7)	62.7 (17.1)	67.8 (19.9)	65.8 (18.8)	58.2 (14.6)	46.0 (7.8)	35.8 (2.1)	28.2 (−2.1)	45.0 (7.2)
Mean minimum °F (°C)	7.4 (−13.7)	10.1 (−12.2)	17.9 (−7.8)	29.2 (−1.6)	39.6 (4.2)	50.8 (10.4)	58.3 (14.6)	55.8 (13.2)	45.2 (7.3)	33.0 (0.6)	22.9 (−5.1)	14.6 (−9.7)	5.0 (−15.0)
Record low °F (°C)	−22 (−30)	−13 (−25)	−1 (−18)	11 (−12)	30 (−1)	40 (4)	49 (9)	45 (7)	30 (−1)	23 (−5)	10 (−12)	−8 (−22)	−22 (−30)
Average precipitation inches (mm)	3.03 (77)	2.59 (66)	3.70 (94)	3.55 (90)	3.83 (97)	3.98 (101)	4.74 (120)	3.77 (96)	4.83 (123)	3.81 (97)	2.97 (75)	3.43 (87)	44.23 (1,123)
Average snowfall inches (cm)	9.1 (23)	9.4 (24)	5.6 (14)	0.4 (1.0)	0.0 (0.0)	0.0 (0.0)	0.0 (0.0)	0.0 (0.0)	0.0 (0.0)	0.2 (0.51)	0.8 (2.0)	4.4 (11)	29.9 (76)
Average extreme snow depth inches (cm)	5.3 (13)	5.1 (13)	4.0 (10)	0.2 (0.51)	0.0 (0.0)	0.0 (0.0)	0.0 (0.0)	0.0 (0.0)	0.0 (0.0)	0.1 (0.25)	0.3 (0.76)	2.4 (6.1)	9.8 (25)
Average precipitation days (≥ 0.01 in)	10.9	10.4	11.0	11.4	13.0	11.5	10.9	10.0	9.2	9.2	8.5	10.3	126.3
Average snowy days (≥ 0.1 in)	5.1	4.8	2.7	0.3	0.0	0.0	0.0	0.0	0.0	0.0	0.7	2.7	16.3
Average ultraviolet index	2	3	4	6	8	9	9	8	6	4	2	2	5
Source 1: NOAA
Source 2: Weather Atlas (UV data)

Climate data for Harrisburg, Pennsylvania (Harrisburg Capital City Airport) 1991–2020 normals, extremes 1939–present
Month	Jan	Feb	Mar	Apr	May	Jun	Jul	Aug	Sep	Oct	Nov	Dec	Year
Record high °F (°C)	73 (23)	83 (28)	86 (30)	93 (34)	97 (36)	100 (38)	107 (42)	101 (38)	102 (39)	97 (36)	84 (29)	75 (24)	107 (42)
Mean maximum °F (°C)	61.8 (16.6)	61.6 (16.4)	73.3 (22.9)	85.1 (29.5)	89.5 (31.9)	93.6 (34.2)	95.9 (35.5)	94.2 (34.6)	89.9 (32.2)	82.3 (27.9)	71.6 (22.0)	62.8 (17.1)	97.1 (36.2)
Mean daily maximum °F (°C)	40.3 (4.6)	43.2 (6.2)	52.6 (11.4)	64.9 (18.3)	74.7 (23.7)	83.2 (28.4)	87.6 (30.9)	85.4 (29.7)	78.6 (25.9)	66.7 (19.3)	55.1 (12.8)	44.4 (6.9)	64.7 (18.2)
Daily mean °F (°C)	32.6 (0.3)	34.7 (1.5)	43.2 (6.2)	54.1 (12.3)	64.0 (17.8)	73.0 (22.8)	77.5 (25.3)	75.4 (24.1)	68.5 (20.3)	56.7 (13.7)	46.0 (7.8)	37.0 (2.8)	55.2 (12.9)
Mean daily minimum °F (°C)	24.9 (−3.9)	26.2 (−3.2)	33.9 (1.1)	43.3 (6.3)	53.2 (11.8)	62.8 (17.1)	67.4 (19.7)	65.5 (18.6)	58.4 (14.7)	46.7 (8.2)	37.0 (2.8)	29.5 (−1.4)	45.7 (7.6)
Mean minimum °F (°C)	8.0 (−13.3)	10.8 (−11.8)	17.7 (−7.9)	28.5 (−1.9)	38.7 (3.7)	49.4 (9.7)	57.0 (13.9)	54.5 (12.5)	43.7 (6.5)	32.0 (0.0)	22.6 (−5.2)	14.7 (−9.6)	5.6 (−14.7)
Record low °F (°C)	−9 (−23)	−5 (−21)	2 (−17)	19 (−7)	31 (−1)	40 (4)	49 (9)	45 (7)	30 (−1)	23 (−5)	13 (−11)	−8 (−22)	−9 (−23)
Average precipitation inches (mm)	2.64 (67)	2.36 (60)	3.35 (85)	3.70 (94)	3.48 (88)	3.72 (94)	4.30 (109)	3.68 (93)	4.12 (105)	3.68 (93)	2.80 (71)	3.15 (80)	40.98 (1,041)
Average precipitation days (≥ 0.01 in)	9.4	9.3	10.7	12.1	13.7	11.9	11.8	11.1	9.5	11.0	8.8	10.1	129.4
Average relative humidity (%)	64.4	63.2	60.7	59.2	65.2	67.7	68.6	72.2	73.8	70.5	68.2	66.4	66.7
Average dew point °F (°C)	17.4 (−8.1)	19.0 (−7.2)	26.4 (−3.1)	36.0 (2.2)	48.7 (9.3)	58.5 (14.7)	63.1 (17.3)	63.0 (17.2)	56.5 (13.6)	43.7 (6.5)	33.4 (0.8)	22.8 (−5.1)	40.7 (4.8)
Mean monthly sunshine hours	154.9	167.2	213.8	235.7	266.7	288.5	310.1	285.4	226.7	199.2	139.6	126.0	2,613.8
Percentage possible sunshine	52	56	58	59	60	64	68	67	61	58	47	43	59
Source: NOAA (relative humidity, dew point and sun 1961–1990)

See or edit raw graph data.

== Cityscape ==
=== Neighborhoods ===
Downtown Harrisburg, which includes the Pennsylvania State Capitol Complex, is the central core business and financial center for the Harrisburg–Carlisle metropolitan statistical area and serves as the seat of government for Dauphin County and the Commonwealth of Pennsylvania. There are over a dozen large neighborhoods and historic districts within the city.

=== Architecture ===
Harrisburg's architecture spans over 200 years of evolving construction and design and thus contains a breadth of various architectural styles. Six Municipal Historic Districts, multiple National Historic Districts, and Architectural Conservation Overlay Districts have in turn have been established to preserve and guide any new development of areas with respect to their character.

Harrisburg is home to the Pennsylvania State Capitol. Completed in 1906, the central dome rises to a height of 272 feet (83 m) and was modeled on that of St. Peter's Basilica in Vatican City, Rome. The building was designed by Joseph Miller Huston and is adorned with sculpture, including Love and Labor, the Unbroken Law and The Burden of Life, the Broken Law by sculptor George Grey Barnard; murals by Violet Oakley and Edwin Austin Abbey; tile floor by Henry Mercer, which tells the story of the Pennsylvania. The state capitol is only the third-tallest building of Harrisburg. The five tallest buildings are 333 Market Street the tallest building outside of Philadelphia and Pittsburgh with a height of 341 feet (104 m), Pennsylvania Place with a height of 291 feet (89 m), the Pennsylvania State Capitol with a height of 272 feet (83 m), Presbyterian Apartments with a height of 259 feet (79 m) and the Fulton Bank Building with a height of 255 feet (78 m).

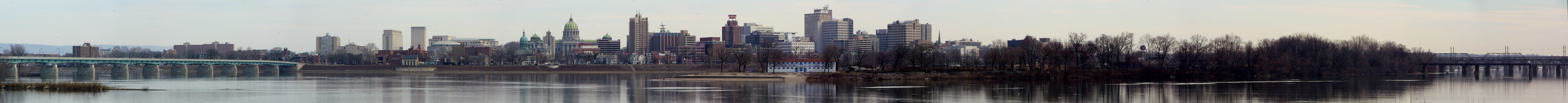
A panoramic of downtown Harrisburg from Wormleysburg across the Susquehanna River. M. Harvey Taylor Memorial Bridge is on the far left across from the Pennsylvania State Capitol, City Island and the Walnut Street Bridge and Market Street bridges, March 2013.

== Demographics ==
Historical population
Census	Pop.	Note	%±
1790	875		—
1800	1,472		68.2%
1810	2,287		55.4%
1820	2,990		30.7%
1830	4,312		44.2%
1840	5,980		38.7%
1850	7,834		31.0%
1860	13,405		71.1%
1870	23,104		72.4%
1880	30,762		33.1%
1890	39,385		28.0%
1900	50,167		27.4%
1910	64,186		27.9%
1920	75,917		18.3%
1930	80,339		5.8%
1940	83,893		4.4%
1950	89,544		6.7%
1960	79,697		−11.0%
1970	68,061		−14.6%
1980	53,264		−21.7%
1990	52,376		−1.7%
2000	48,950		−6.5%
2010	49,528		1.2%
2020	50,099		1.2%
2024 (est.)	50,649		1.1%
U.S. Decennial Census; 2020

=== Racial and ethnic composition ===
Harrisburg city, Pennsylvania – Racial and ethnic composition Note: the US Census treats Hispanic/Latino as an ethnic category. This table excludes Latinos from the racial categories and assigns them to a separate category. Hispanics/Latinos may be of any race.
Race / Ethnicity (NH = Non-Hispanic)	Pop 1950	Pop 1960	Pop 1970	Pop 1980	Pop 1990	Pop 2000	Pop 2010	Pop 2020	% 1950	% 1960	% 1970	% 1980	% 1990	% 2000	% 2010	% 2020
White alone (NH)	79,389	64,500	46,761	27,493	21,313	13,988	12,290	11,405	88.66%	80.93%	68.70%	51.62%	40.69%	28.58%	24.81%	22.76%
Black or African American alone (NH)	10,134	15,096	20,911	23,007	25,904	26,292	24,727	21,263	11.32%	18.94%	30.72%	43.19%	49.46%	53.71%	49.93%	42.44%
Native American or Alaska Native alone (NH)	7	12	N/A	171	120	157	146	107	0.01%	0.02%	N/A	0.32%	0.23%	0.32%	0.29%	0.21%
Asian alone (NH)	13	48	151	345	863	1,370	1,692	1,768	0.01%	0.06%	0.22%	0.65%	1.65%	2.80%	3.42%	3.53%
Pacific Islander alone (NH)	13	48	151	345	863	20	4	19	0.01%	0.06%	0.22%	0.65%	1.65%	0.04%	0.01%	0.04%
Other Race alone (NH)	1	41	238	135	154	115	97	403	0.00%	0.05%	0.35%	0.25%	0.29%	0.23%	0.20%	0.80%
Mixed Race or Multi-Racial (NH)	N/A	N/A	N/A	N/A	N/A	1,284	1,633	2,230	N/A	N/A	N/A	N/A	N/A	2.62%	3.30%	4.45%
Hispanic or Latino (any race)	N/A	N/A	N/A	2,113	4,022	5,724	8,939	12,904	N/A	N/A	N/A	3.97%	7.68%	11.69%	18.05%	25.76%
Total	89,544	79,697	68,061	53,264	52,376	48,950	49,528	50,099	100.00%	100.00%	100.00%	100.00%	100.00%	100.00%	100.00%	100.00%

=== 2020 census ===
As of the 2020 census, Harrisburg had a population of 50,099. The median age was 33.5 years. 25.3% of residents were under the age of 18 and 12.2% of residents were 65 years of age or older. For every 100 females there were 94.9 males, and for every 100 females age 18 and over there were 91.9 males age 18 and over.

100.0% of residents lived in urban areas, while 0.0% lived in rural areas.

There were 21,293 households in Harrisburg, of which 28.4% had children under the age of 18 living in them. Of all households, 20.4% were married-couple households, 28.4% were households with a male householder and no spouse or partner present, and 42.1% were households with a female householder and no spouse or partner present. About 40.8% of all households were made up of individuals and 12.2% had someone living alone who was 65 years of age or older.

There were 24,727 housing units, of which 13.9% were vacant. The homeowner vacancy rate was 3.0% and the rental vacancy rate was 8.3%.

Racial composition as of the 2020 census
Race	Number	Percent
White	13,265	26.5%
Black or African American	22,429	44.8%
American Indian and Alaska Native	257	0.5%
Asian	1,791	3.6%
Native Hawaiian and Other Pacific Islander	24	0.0%
Some other race	7,039	14.1%
Two or more races	5,294	10.6%
Hispanic or Latino (of any race)	12,904	25.8%

=== 2000 census ===
There were 20,561 households, out of which 28.5% had children under the age of 13 living with them, 23.4% were married couples living together, 24.4% had a female householder with no husband present, and 46.9% were non-families. 39.3% of all households were made up of individuals, and 10.4% had someone living alone who was 65 years of age or older. The average household size was 2.32 and the average family size was 3.15.

In the city, the population was spread out, with 28.2% under the age of 18, 9.2% from 13 to 24, 31.0% from 25 to 44, 20.8% from 45 to 64, and 10.9% who were 65 years of age or older. The median age was 33 years. For every 100 females, there were 88.7 males. For every 100 females age 13 and over, there were 84.8 males.

The median income for a household in the city was $26,920, and the median income for a family was $29,556. Males had a median income of $90,670 versus $24,405 for females. The per capita income for the city was $15,787. About 23.4% of families and 24.6% of the population were below the poverty line, including 34.9% of those under age 13 and 16.6% of those age 65 or over.

The six largest ethnic groups in the city are: African American (52.4%), German (15.0%), Irish (6.5%), Italian (3.3%), English (2.4%), and Dutch (1.0%). While the metropolitan area is approximately 15% German-American, 11.4% are Irish-American and 9.6% English-American. Harrisburg has one of the largest Pennsylvania Dutch communities in the nation, and also has the nation's ninth-largest Swedish-American communities in the nation.

The very first census taken in the United States occurred in 1790. At that time Harrisburg was a small, but substantial colonial town with a population of 875 residents. With the increase of the city's prominence as an industrial and transportation center, Harrisburg reached its peak population build up in 1950, topping out at nearly 90,000 residents. Since the 1950s, Harrisburg, along with other northeastern urban centers large and small, has experienced a declining population that is ultimately fueling the growth of its suburbs, although the decline – which was very rapid in the 1960s and 1970s – has slowed considerably since the 1980s. Unlike Western and Southern states, Pennsylvania maintains a complex system of municipalities and has very little legislation on either the annexation/expansion of cities or the consolidating of municipal entities.

== Economy ==
Harrisburg is the metropolitan center for some 400 communities. Its economy and more than 45,000 businesses are diversified with a large representation of service-related industries, especially health-care and a growing technological and biotechnology industry to accompany the dominant government field inherent to being the state's capital. National and international firms with major operations include Ahold Delhaize, ArcelorMittal Steel, HP Inc., IBM, Hershey Foods, Harsco Corporation, Ollie's Bargain Outlet, Rite Aid Corporation, Tyco Electronics, and Volvo Construction Equipment. The largest employers, the federal and state governments, provide stability to the economy. The region's extensive transportation infrastructure has allowed it to become a prominent center for trade, warehousing, and distribution.

=== Employers ===
==== Top 10 ====
According to the Region Economic Development Corporation, the top employers in the region are:

#	Employer	# of Employees	Industry
1	Commonwealth of Pennsylvania	21,885	Government
2	United States Federal government, including the military	18,000	Government
3	Giant Food Stores	8,902	Grocery store
4	Penn State Hershey Medical Center	8,849	Hospital, Medical research
5	Hershey Entertainment and Resorts, including Hersheypark	7,500	Entertainment and amusement parks
6	The Hershey Company	6,500	Food manufacturer
7	Wal-Mart Stores, Inc.	6,090	Retail store chain
8	Highmark	5,200	Health insurance
9	TE Connectivity	4,700	Electronic component manufacturer
10	UPMC Pinnacle, including Harrisburg Hospital and Polyclinic Medical Center	3,997	Health-care and hospital system

== People and culture ==
=== Culture ===
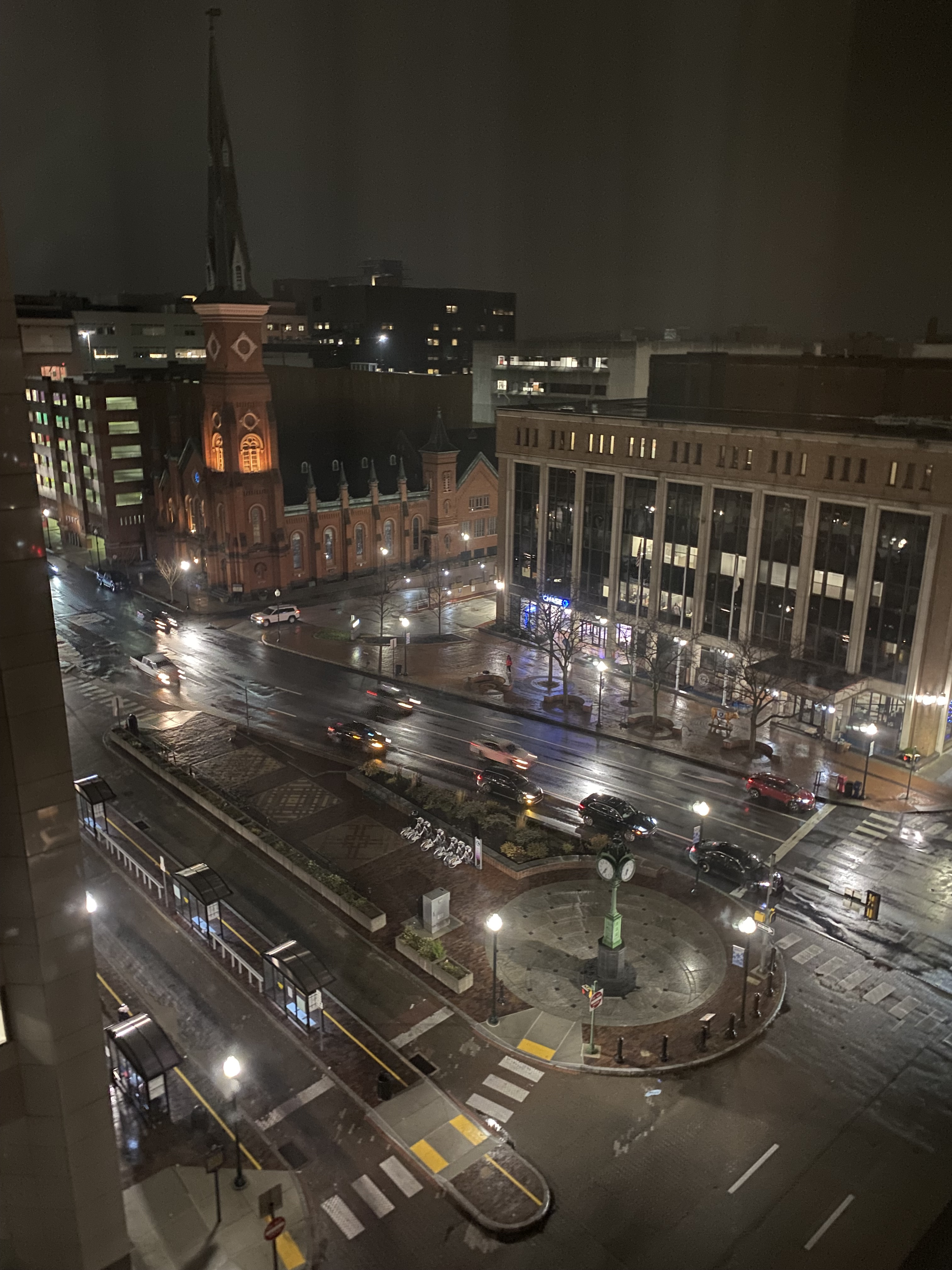
Harrisburg's Market Square, formerly a market, is a public transport hub and commercial center in the city.

In the mid-20th century, Harrisburg was home to many nightclubs and other performance venues, including the Madrid Ballroom, the Coliseum, the Chestnut Street Hall. and the Hi-Hat. These venues featured performances from Duke Ellington, Dizzy Gillespie, Fletcher Henderson, Andy Kirk, and other jazz greats. Segregationist policy forbade these musicians from staying overnight in downtown Harrisburg, however, making the Jackson Hotel in Harrisburg's 7th Ward a hub of black musicians prior to the 1960s.

Several organizations support and develop visual arts in Harrisburg. The Art Association of Harrisburg was founded in 1926 and continues to provide education and exhibits throughout the year. Additionally, the Susquehanna Art Museum, founded in 1989, offers classes, exhibits and community events. A local urban sketching group, Harrisburg Sketchers, convenes artists monthly.

Downtown Harrisburg has two major performance centers. The Whitaker Center for Science and the Arts, which was completed in 1999, is the first center of its type in the United States where education, science and the performing arts take place under one roof. The Forum, a 1,763-seat concert and lecture hall built in 1930–31, is a state-owned and operated facility located within the State Capitol Complex. Since 1931, The Forum has been home to the Harrisburg Symphony Orchestra. Other performance centers include The Capitol Room at House of Music, Arts & Culture, Open Stage of Harrisburg, Harrisburg Improv Theatre, Gamut Theatre Group, Popcorn Hat Players Children's Theatre and Theatre Harrisburg.

Beginning in 2001, downtown Harrisburg saw a resurgence of commercial nightlife development. This has been credited with reversing the city's financial decline, and has made downtown Harrisburg a destination for events from jazz festivals to Top-40 nightclubs.

In 2004, Harrisburg hosted CowParade, an international public art exhibit that has been featured in major cities all over the world. Fiberglass sculptures of cows are decorated by local artists, and distributed over the city center, in public places such as train stations and parks. They often feature artwork and designs specific to local culture, as well as city life and other relevant themes.

With gradual but steady increases in the number and variety of multi-purpose venues, bars, and restaurants since the mid-2010s, as well as large concerts sponsored by Harrisburg University, the live music and entertainment scene expanded to a "mini-explosion" by 2022 of big artists with a wide draw from both near and far.

=== Events ===
Harrisburg notably is home to large events occurring throughout the year which attracts visitors from across the country and internationally.

- The annual gathering of the Ahmadiyya Muslim Community USA has been held in Harrisburg for over a decade, usually in July.
- The annual Pennsylvania Farm Show held at the Pennsylvania Farm Show Complex is the largest agricultural exhibition of its kind in the nation. Farmers from all over Pennsylvania come to show their animals and participate in competitions. Livestock are on display for people to interact with and view.
- The Great American Outdoor Show, the world's largest outdoor recreation show, is held each February at the Pennsylvania Farm Show Complex drawing hundreds of thousands of visitors and includes demonstrations, seminars, calling competitions, education and safety programs, and a country music concert.
- Motorama, the nation's largest all-indoor motorsports event, is held annually and features over 2,000 racers.
- The Ice & Fire Festival, occurring each March downtown, exhibits ice sculptures, fire dancers, food trucks, and an ice skating rink with live music.
- The Pennsylvania Auto Show is held annually at the Pennsylvania Farm Show Complex.
- ArtsFest, held each spring, features juried artisans and craftsmen from across the state and country selling art and unique crafts.
- Pride Festival of Central PA is the area's three-day annual LGBT pride event, regularly attracting over 5,000 LGBTQ and straight allied supporters.
- The Antique Fire Apparatus Show & Muster along Riverfront Park features displays of regional fire engines from past and present, a flea market, and firefighting competitions.
- Harrisburg's Independence Day Celebration, under various names (formerly "MusicFest"), occurs each Independence Day weekend along Riverfront Park and City Island with food, live music, activities and fireworks.
- Kipona Festival, inaugurated in 1916 and held each Labor Day Weekend, celebrates the Susquehanna River as a three-day festival on Riverfront Park and City Island featuring food, fireworks, live music, artist markets, canoe races, wire walkers, pet areas, and family carnival activities.
- The Greenbelt's Tour de Belt is a weekend-long series of bike-related events and includes an art show and craft breweries.
- Cultural Fest, put on each summer by Dauphin County and held at City Island, celebrates the multicultural diversity of the area.
- Riverfront Park Concert Series, a summer pop-up concert, features national music acts each summer.
- The Harrisburg Marathon runs along the riverfront and City Island and is a two-day event usually held each fall.
- WoofStock, the celebration of all things canine along with music, food and prizes, is held each September at Riverfront Park and is the largest pet adoption event on the East Coast.
- BrewFest, held each October at Fort Hunter Park, features local craft beers, food and vendors.
- Harrisburg's New Year's Eve Celebration downtown has live music, children's activities, and the strawberry drop and fireworks at midnight.

=== Media ===
Harrisburg area is part of the Harrisburg-Lancaster-Lebanon-York media market which consists of the lower counties in south central Pennsylvania and borders the media markets of Philadelphia and Baltimore. It is the 43rd largest media market in the United States.

The Harrisburg area has several newspapers. The Patriot-News, which is published in Cumberland County, serves the Harrisburg area and has a tri-weekly circulation of over 100,000. The Sentinel, which is published in Carlisle, roughly 20 miles west of Harrisburg, serves many of Harrisburg's western suburbs in Cumberland County. The Press and Journal, published in Middletown, is one of many weekly general information newspapers in the Harrisburg area. There are also numerous television and radio stations in the Harrisburg/Lancaster/York area.

==== Newspapers ====
- The Patriot-News
- Central Penn Business Journal
- Press and Journal (Pennsylvania)
- Carlisle Sentinel

==== Television ====
The Harrisburg TV market is served by:

- WGAL – (NBC)
- WXBU – (Univision)
- WHBG-TV – cable-only, public access
- WHP-TV – (CBS/MyNetworkTV/CW)
- WHTM-TV – (ABC)
- WCZS-LD – (CTVN)
- WITF-TV – (PBS)
- WPMT – (Fox)
- WLYH – independent, religious
- PCN-TV, is a cable television network dedicated to 24-hour coverage of government and public affairs in the commonwealth.
- Roxbury News – independent news

==== Radio ====
According to Arbitron, Harrisburg's radio market is ranked 78th in the nation.

This is a list of FM stations in the greater Harrisburg metropolitan area.

Callsign	MHz	Band	"Name" Format, Owner	City of license
WDCV	88.3	FM	Indie/College Rock, Dickinson College	Carlisle
WXPH	88.7	FM	WXPN relay, University of Pennsylvania	Harrisburg
WSYC	88.7	FM	Alternative, Shippensburg University	Shippensburg
WITF-FM	89.5	FM	NPR	Harrisburg
WVMM	90.7	FM	Indie/College Rock, Messiah University	Grantham
WJAZ	91.7	FM	WRTI relay, Classical/Jazz, Temple University	Harrisburg
WKHL	92.1	FM	"K-Love" Contemporary Christian	Palmyra
WPPY	92.7	FM	"Happy 92.7" Adult Contemporary	Starview
WTPA-FM	93.5	FM	"93.5 WTPA" Classic Rock	Mechanicsburg
WRBT	94.9	FM	"BOB 94.9" Country	Harrisburg
WLAN	96.9	FM	"FM 97" CHR	Lancaster
WRVV	97.3	FM	The River 97.3 Classic Rock	Harrisburg
WYCR	98.5	FM	"98.5 The Peak" Classic Hits	York
WQLV	98.9	FM	98.9 WQLV Hot AC	Millersburg
WHKF	99.3	FM	"REAL 99.3" Urban Contemporary (Hip Hop & R&B)	Harrisburg
WFVY	100.1	FM	"Froggy Valley 100.1" Country	Lebanon
WROZ	101.3 & 99.3 HD2	FM	Air1 Christian Contemporary	Lancaster
WARM	103.3	FM	"WARM 103.3" Hot AC	York
WNNK	104.1	FM	"WINK 104" Hot AC	Harrisburg
WQXA	105.7	FM	"105.7 The X" Active Rock	York
WWKL	106.7	FM	"HOT 106.7" Rhythmic CHR	Hershey
WGTY	107.7	FM	"Great Country"	York

This is a list of AM stations in the greater Harrisburg metropolitan area.

Callsign	kHz	Band	Format	City of license
WHP (AM)	580	AM	Conservative News/Talk	Harrisburg
WHYF	720	AM	EWTN Global Catholic Radio Network	Shiremanstown
WSBA (AM)	910	AM	News/Talk	York
WADV	940	AM	Gospel	Lebanon
WHYL	960	AM	Adult Standards	Carlisle
WIOO	1000	AM	Classic Country	Carlisle
WKBO	1230	AM	Christian Contemporary	Harrisburg
WQXA	1250	AM	Country	York
WLBR	1270	AM	Talk	Lebanon
WHGB	1400	AM	ESPN Radio (Formerly Adult R&B: The Touch)	Harrisburg
WTKT	1460	AM	Sports: "The Ticket"	Harrisburg
WRDD	1480	AM	Country	Shippensburg
WRKY	1490	AM	Classic rock	Lancaster
WPDC	1600	AM	Sport	Elizabethtown
Penndot	1670	AM	NOAA Weather and Travel	Several

==== Harrisburg in film ====
Several feature films and television series have been filmed or set in and around Harrisburg and the greater Susquehanna Valley.

=== Museums, art collections, and sites of interest ===
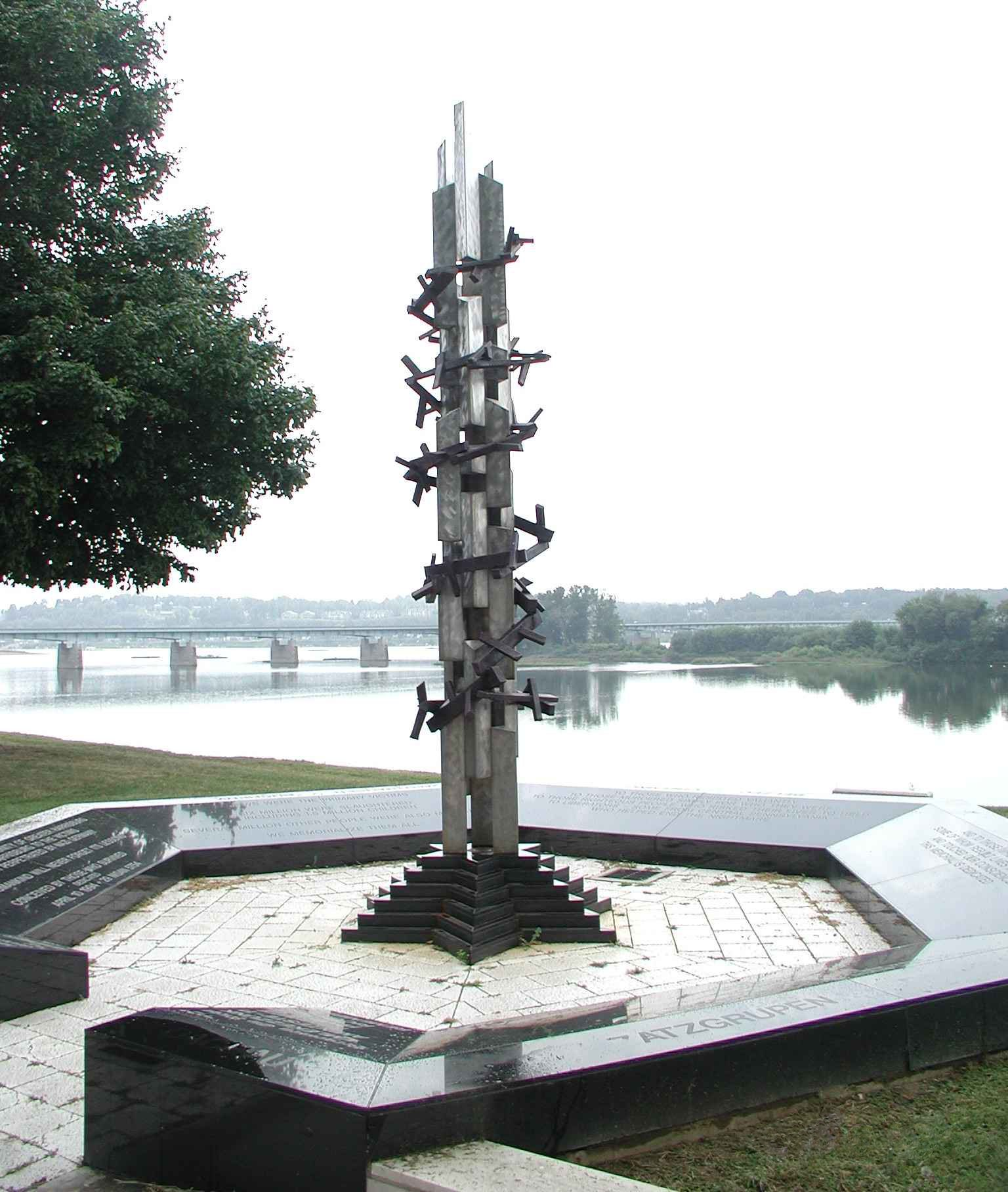
The Pennsylvania Holocaust Memorial in Harrisburg's Riverfront Park and the Capital Area Greenbelt

- Broad Street Market, one of the oldest continuously operating farmers markets in the United States
- Dauphin County Veteran's Memorial Obelisk inspired by the classic Roman/Egyptian obelisk form; located in uptown Harrisburg
- Dauphin Narrows Statue of Liberty on the Susquehanna River north of Harrisburg
- Fort Hunter Mansion and Park, located north of downtown Harrisburg on a bluff overlooking the Susquehanna River
- Harrisburg Doll Museum, which contains over 5,000 dolls and toys stretching back to 1840
- John Harris – Simon Cameron Mansion, a National Historic Landmark located in downtown Harrisburg along the river
- Market Square, originally planned in 1785 and serves as the pinnacle of downtown
- Midtown Scholar Bookstore, largest independent bookstore on the East Coast
- National Civil War Museum, located at Reservoir Park and affiliated with the Smithsonian Institution in Washington, D.C.
- Pennsylvania National Fire Museum
- Pennsylvania Farm Show Complex & Expo Center, one of the largest convention/exhibition centers on the east coast which hosts multiple annual events, most notably the Pennsylvania Farm Show
- Pennsylvania State Capitol Complex, the center of government for the commonwealth and home to the state capitol building, state archives, and state library
- Pride of the Susquehanna paddle-wheel riverboat, offering daily sightseeing tours and special theme cruises
- Reservoir Park, the largest public park in the city containing an amphitheater and playground, and connected to the Greenbelt
- State Museum of Pennsylvania, featuring a planetarium and the Marshalls Creek Mastodon, one of the most complete mastodon fossils in North America.
- Strawberry Square, across the street from the Capitol Complex, home of many state offices and a small shopping center
- Susquehanna art museum, recently renovated and relocated in Midtown
- Art Association of Harrisburg, founded in 1926, located in the Governor Findlay Mansion
- Whitaker Center for Science and the Arts, features an IMAX theater
- Zembo Shrine Building, a significant example of Moorish Revival architecture.

=== Parks and recreation ===
The following is a list of the major parks of Harrisburg:

- Capital Area Greenbelt, a twenty mile long greenway linking city neighborhoods, parks and open spaces. It connects Wildwood Lake Park, Riverfront Park, the Harrisburg Mall, Penbrook Park, Reservoir Park, Harrisburg Area Community College, and Veterans Park. It is open to cyclists and pedestrians.
- City Island and Beach
- Italian Lake, 9.4 acre park located in the Uptown neighborhood.
- Paxtang Park, a historic 40-acre trolley park in the 1900s, restored in 2020 as a park with mountain bike trails
- Reservoir Park
- Riverfront Park
- Wildwood Lake Park

== Sports ==
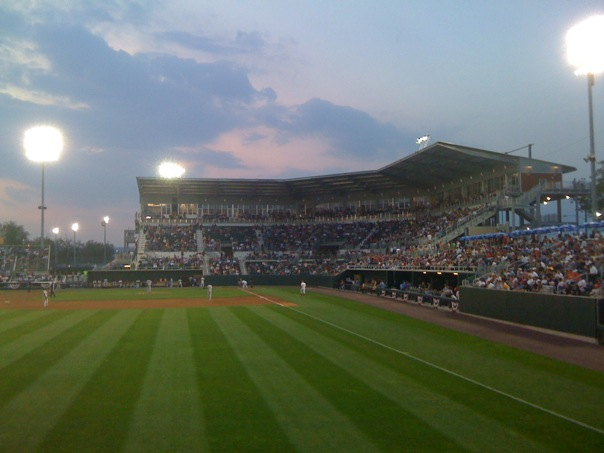
FNB Field

Harrisburg serves as the hub of professional sports in South Central Pennsylvania. A host of teams compete in the region including three professional baseball teams, the Harrisburg Senators, the Lancaster Stormers, and the York Revolution. The Senators are the oldest team of the three, with the current incarnation playing since 1987. The original Harrisburg Senators began playing in the Eastern League in 1924. Playing its home games at Island Field, the team won the league championship in the 1927, 1928, and 1931 seasons. The Senators played a few more seasons before flood waters destroyed Island Field in 1936, effectively ending Eastern League participation for fifty-one years. In 1940, Harrisburg gained an Interstate League team affiliated with the Pittsburgh Pirates; however, the team remained in the city only until 1943, when it moved to nearby York and renamed the York Pirates. The current Harrisburg Senators, affiliated with the Washington Nationals, have won the Eastern League championship in the 1987, 1993, 1996, 1997, 1998, and 1999 seasons.

Club	League	Venue	Founded	Titles
Harrisburg Senators	Eastern League, Baseball	FNB Field	1987	6
Hershey Bears	AHL, Ice hockey	Giant Center	1932	11
Penn FC	USL, Soccer	FNB Field	2004	1
Harrisburg Heat	MASL, Indoor soccer	Pennsylvania Farm Show Complex	2012	0
Keystone Assault	WFA, Women's football	TBA	2009	1
Harrisburg Lunatics	PIHA, Inline hockey	Susquehanna Sports Center	2001	0
Harrisburg RFC	EPRU, MARFU, Rugby	Cibort Park, Bressler	1969	1
Harrisburg Stampede	NAL, Arena Football	Pennsylvania Farm Show Complex	2008	0

== Government ==
=== City of Harrisburg ===
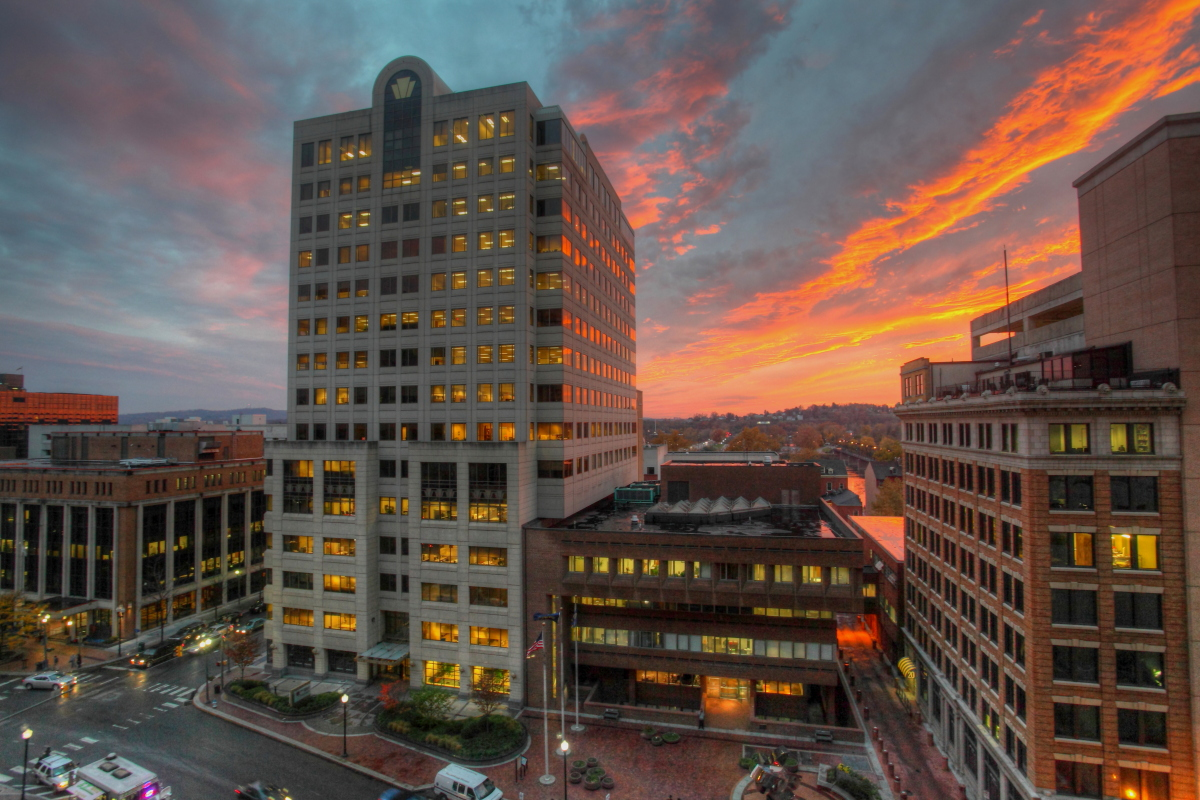
Harrisburg Market Square showing the Penn National Insurance Building (left) and Martin Luther King Jr. City Government Center (right)

The Martin Luther King Jr. City Government Center, the first government building and only city hall in the United States named after the Civil Rights Movement leader, serves as a central location for the city's administrative functions. Harrisburg has been served since 1970 by the "strong mayor" form of municipal government, with separate executive and legislative branches. The Mayor serves a four-year term with no term limits. As the full-time chief executive, the Mayor oversees the operation of 34 agencies, run by department and office heads, some of whom form the Mayor's cabinet, including the Department of Public Safety (which includes the Bureau of Police, Bureau of Fire, and Bureau of Codes), Public Works, Business Administration, Parks and Recreation, Incineration and Steam Generation, Building & Housing Development, and Solicitor. The city had 424 full-time employees in 2019 (Water and Sewer employees were transferred to Capital Region Water effective 2013). The current mayor of Harrisburg is Wanda Williams whose term expires January 2026.

There are seven city council members, all elected at large, who serve part-time for four-year terms. There are two other elected city posts, city treasurer and city controller, who separately head their own fiscally related offices.

The city government had been in financial distress for many years in the 2000s. It has operated under the state's Act 47 Harrisburg Strong Plan provisions since 2011. The Act provides for municipalities that are in a state akin to bankruptcy. The city balanced its budget in the late 2010s, was expected to have a surplus of $1 million in 2019, and maintained a surplus in 2020 despite COVID-19.

==== Property tax reform ====
Harrisburg is also known nationally for its use of a two-tiered land value taxation. Harrisburg has taxed land at a rate six times that on improvements since 1975, and this policy has been credited by its former mayor Stephen R. Reed, as well as by the city's former city manager during the 1980s, with reducing the number of vacant structures located in downtown Harrisburg from about 4,200 in 1982 to fewer than 500 in 1995. During this same period of time between 1982 and 1995, nearly 4,700 more city residents became employed, the crime rate dropped 22.5% and the fire rate dropped 51%.

Harrisburg, as well as nearly 20 other Pennsylvania cities, employs a two-rate or split-rate property tax, which requires the taxing of the value of land at a higher rate and the value of the buildings and improvements at a lower one. This can be seen as a compromise between pure LVT and an ordinary property tax falling on real estate (land value plus improvement value). Alternatively, two-rate taxation may be seen as a form that allows gradual transformation of the traditional real estate property tax into a pure land value tax.

Nearly two dozen local Pennsylvania jurisdictions, such as Harrisburg, use two-rate property taxation in which the tax on land value is higher and the tax on improvement value is lower. In 2000, Florenz Plassmann and Nicolaus Tideman wrote that when comparing Pennsylvania cities using a higher tax rate on land value and a lower rate on improvements with similar sized Pennsylvania cities using the same rate on land and improvements, the higher land value taxation leads to increased construction within the jurisdiction.

=== Dauphin County ===
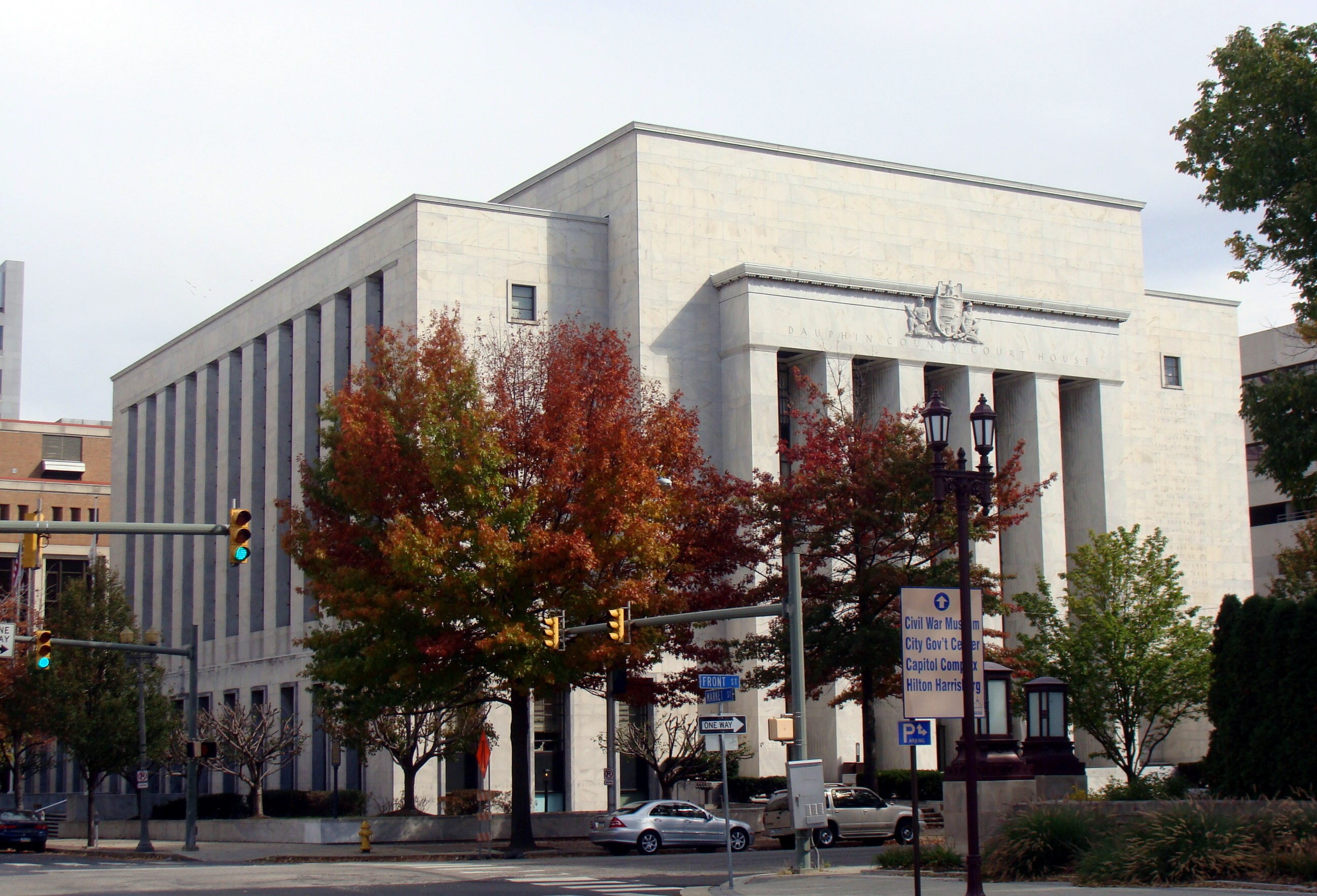
Dauphin County Courthouse, located along the Susquehanna River at Front and Market streets in Downtown Harrisburg

Dauphin County Government Complex, in downtown Harrisburg, serves the administrative functions of the county. The trial court of general jurisdiction for Harrisburg rests with the Court of Dauphin County and is largely funded and operated by county resources and employees.

=== Commonwealth of Pennsylvania ===
The Pennsylvania State Capitol Complex dominates the city's stature as a regional and national hub for government and politics. All administrative functions of the Commonwealth of Pennsylvania are located within the complex and at various nearby locations.

The Commonwealth Judicial Center houses Pennsylvania's three appellate courts, which are located in Harrisburg. The Supreme Court of Pennsylvania, which is the court of last resort in the state, hears arguments in Harrisburg as well as Philadelphia and Pittsburgh. The Superior Court of Pennsylvania and the Commonwealth Court of Pennsylvania are located here. Judges for these courts are elected at large.

=== Federal government ===
The Ronald Reagan Federal Building and Courthouse, located in downtown Harrisburg, serves as the regional administrative offices of the federal government. A branch of the U.S. District Court for the Middle District of Pennsylvania is also located within the courthouse. Due to Harrisburg's prominence as the state capital, federal offices for nearly every agency are located within the city.

The United States military has a strong historic presence in the region. A large retired military population resides in South Central Pennsylvania and the region is home to a large national cemetery at Indiantown Gap. The federal government, including the military, is the top employer in the metropolitan area.

Military bases in the Harrisburg area include:

Installation Name	City	Type, Branch, or Agency
Carlisle Barracks	Carlisle	Managed by the Army, it is home to the United States Army War College
Eastern Distribution Center	New Cumberland	Managed by the Defense Logistics Agency (DLA), it is part of the Defense Distribution Depot Susquehanna (DDSP)
Fort Indiantown Gap	Fort Indiantown Gap	Managed by the Army, the Pennsylvania Department of Military and Veterans Affairs and the Pennsylvania National Guard (PANG), it serves as a military training and staging area. It is home to the Eastern Army National Guard Aviation Training Site (EAATS) and Northeast Counterdrug Training Center (NCTC)
Harrisburg Air Guard Base	Middletown	Home to the 193rd Special Operations Wing, it is located on the former Olmsted Air Force Base, which closed in the early 1970s and became Harrisburg International Airport
Naval Supply Systems Command (NAVSUP)	Mechanicsburg	Part of the Defense Distribution Depot Susquehanna (DDSP)

== Transport ==
=== Airports ===
Domestic and international airlines provide service via Harrisburg International Airport (MDT), which is located southeast of the city in Middletown. HIA is the third-busiest commercial airport in Pennsylvania, in terms of both passengers served and cargo shipments. Generally, due to the lack of an airline hub, the more popular airports in the region are Baltimore, Dulles, and Philadelphia. However, nearly 1.2 million people fly out of Harrisburg each year. Passenger carriers that serve HIA include American Airlines, United Airlines, Delta Air Lines, Frontier Airlines, and Allegiant Air. Capital City Airport (CXY), a moderate-sized business class and general aviation airport, is located across the Susquehanna River in the nearby suburb of New Cumberland, south of Harrisburg. Both airports are owned and operated by the Susquehanna Area Regional Airport Authority (SARAA), which also manages the Franklin County Regional Airport in Chambersburg and Gettysburg Regional Airport in Gettysburg.

From the 1940s to 1960s, the Harrisburg Seaplane Base on the West Shore of the Susquehanna River facilitated the landing and docking of seaplanes in the river between the M. Harvey Taylor Memorial Bridge and the Walnut Street Bridge, until it was converted into a marina and boat dealership.

=== Public transit ===
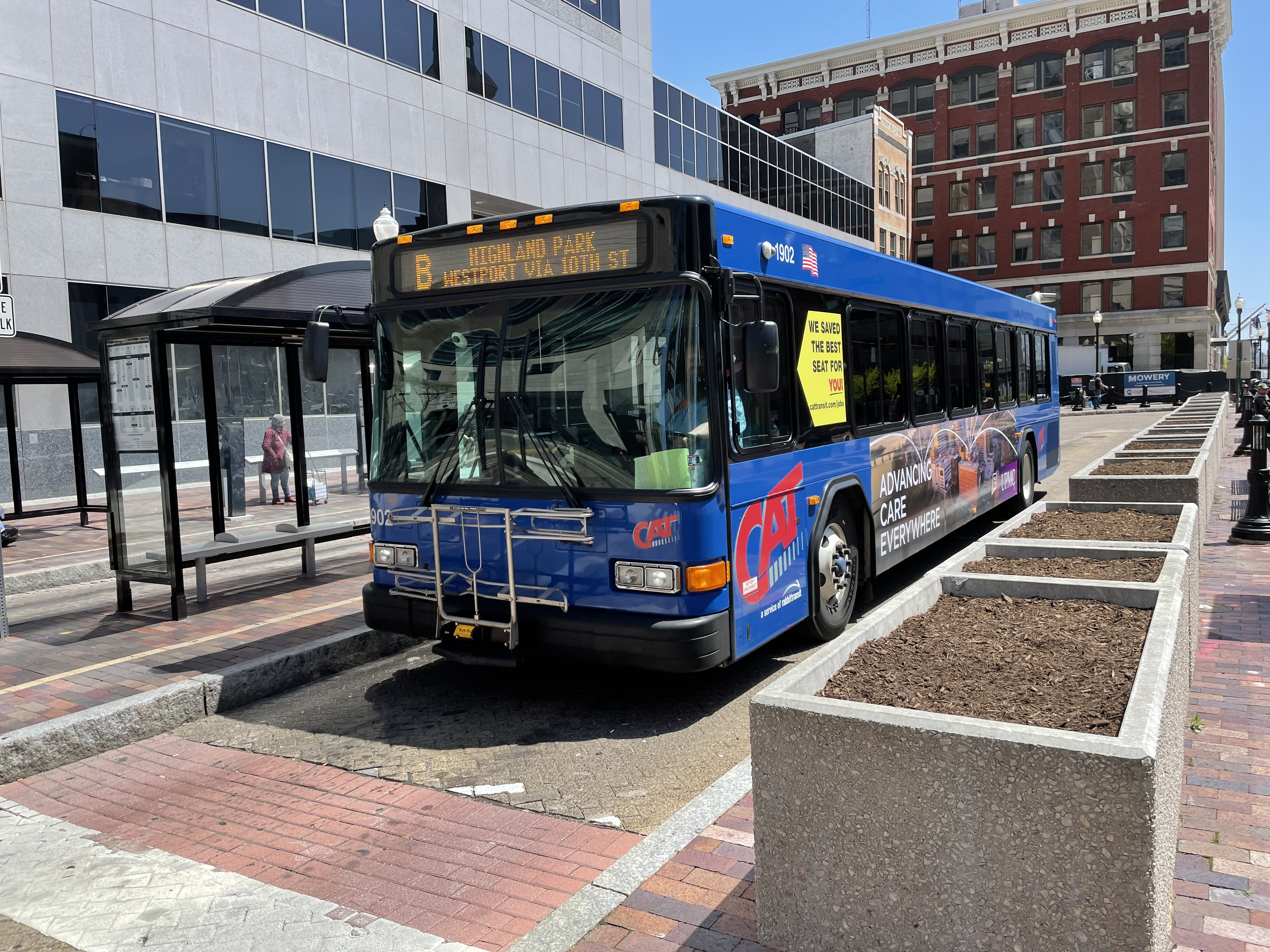
A Capital Area Transit bus at the Market Square Transfer Center in Harrisburg

Harrisburg is served by Capital Area Transit (CAT), which provides public bus and paratransit service throughout the greater metropolitan area. Construction of a commuter rail line designated the Capital Red Rose Corridor, previously named CorridorOne, was planned to link the city with nearby Lancaster until plans went dormant in 2011.

Long-term plans for the region called for the commuter rail line to continue westward to Cumberland County, ending at Carlisle. In early 2005, the project hit a roadblock when the Cumberland County commissioners opposed the plan to extend commuter rail to the West Shore. Due to lack of support from the county commissioners, the Cumberland County portion, and the two new stations in Harrisburg have been removed from the project. In the future, with support from Cumberland County, the commuter rail project may extend to both shores of the Susquehanna River, where the majority of the commuting base for the Harrisburg–Carlisle metropolitan statistical area resides.

In 2006, a second phase of the rail project designated CorridorTwo was announced to the general public. It was planned to link downtown Harrisburg with its eastern suburbs in Dauphin and Lebanon counties, including the areas of Hummelstown, Hershey and Lebanon, and the city of York in York County. Other planned passenger rail corridors also included Route 15 from the Harrisburg area towards Gettysburg, as well as the Susquehanna River communities north of Harrisburg, and the Northern Susquehanna Valley region.

=== Intercity bus service ===
The lower level of the Harrisburg Transportation Center serves as the city's intercity bus terminal. Daily bus services are provided by Greyhound, Capitol Trailways, and Fullington Trailways. They connect Harrisburg to other Pennsylvania cities such as Allentown, Philadelphia, Pittsburgh, Reading, Scranton, State College, Williamsport, and York and nearby, out-of-state cities such as Baltimore, Binghamton, New York, Syracuse, and Washington, D.C., plus many other destinations via transfers.

Curbside intercity bus service is also provided by Megabus from the parking lot of the Harrisburg Mall in nearby Swatara Township, with direct service to Philadelphia, State College, and Pittsburgh.

=== Regional scheduled line bus service ===
The public transit provider in York County, Rabbit Transit, operates its RabbitEXPRESS bus service from York via Route 83N and from Gettysburg via Route 15N which serves both downtown Harrisburg and the main campus for Harrisburg Area Community College. The commuter-oriented service is designed to serve residents from these areas who work in Harrisburg, though reverse commutes are possible under the current schedule. Route 83N makes limited stops in the city of York and at two park and rides along Interstate 83 between York and Harrisburg before making multiple stops in Harrisburg, while Route 15N makes two stops in Gettysburg and at two park and rides along U.S. Route 15 between Gettysburg and Harrisburg before making multiple stops in Harrisburg.

Lebanon Transit operates the Commute King A and Commute King B express bus routes which connect Lebanon to Harrisburg via U.S. Route 422 and Interstate 81 respectively.

A charter/tour bus operator, R & J Transport, also provides weekday, scheduled route commuter service for people working in downtown Harrisburg. R & J, which is based in Schuylkill County, operates two lines, one between Frackville and downtown Harrisburg and the other between Minersville, Pine Grove, and downtown Harrisburg.

=== Rail ===
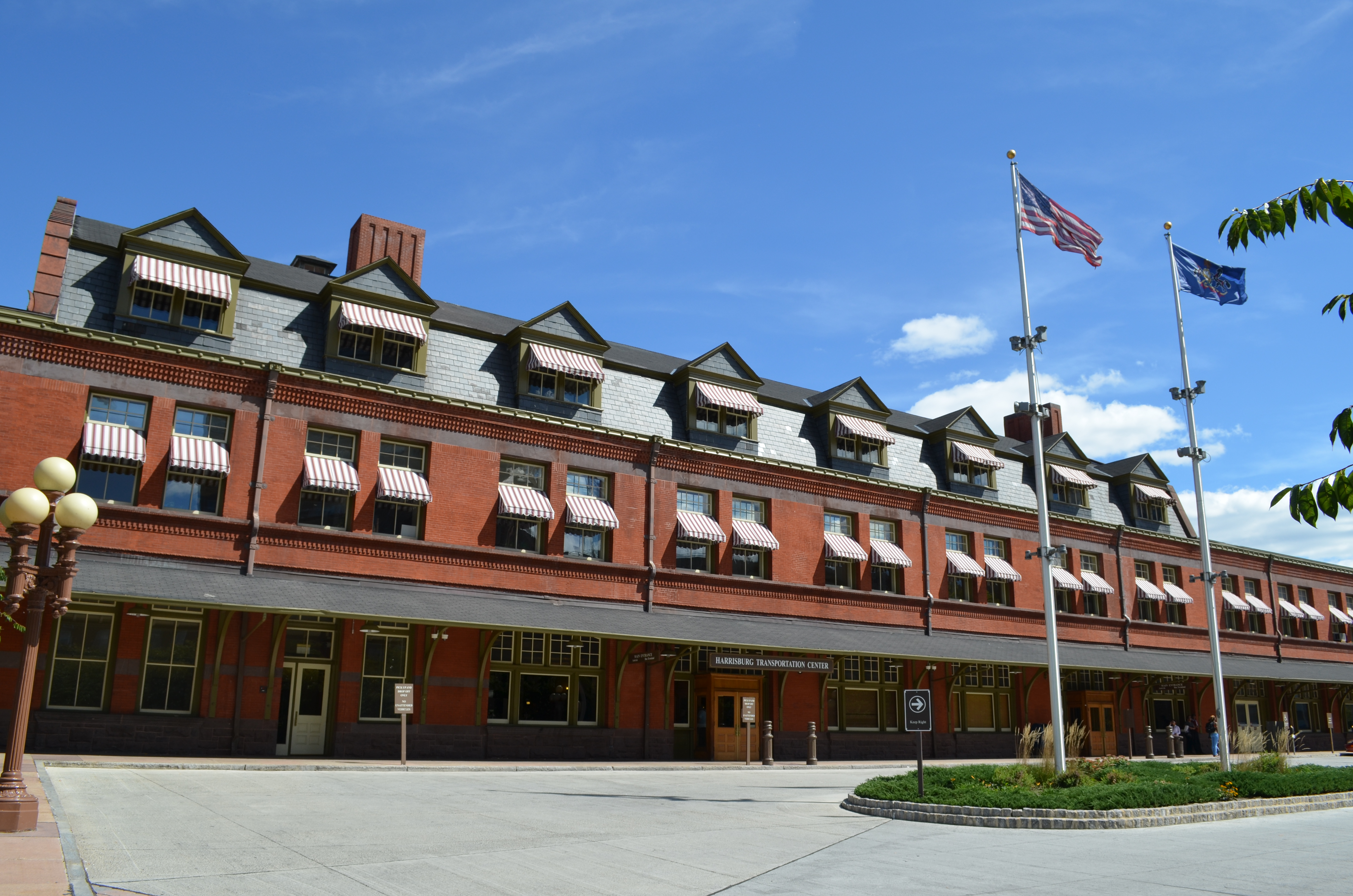
Harrisburg Transportation Center

The Pennsylvania Railroad's main line from New York to Chicago passed through Harrisburg. The line was electrified in the 1930s, with the wires reaching Harrisburg in 1938. They went no further. Plans to electrify through to Pittsburgh and thence to Chicago never saw fruition; sufficient funding was never available. Thus, Harrisburg became where the PRR's crack expresses such as the Broadway Limited changed from electric traction to (originally) a steam locomotive, and later a diesel locomotive. Harrisburg remained a freight rail hub for PRR's successor Conrail, which was later sold off and divided between Norfolk Southern and CSX.

==== Freight rail ====
Norfolk Southern acquired all of Conrail's lines in the Harrisburg area and has continued the city's function as a freight rail hub. Norfolk Southern considers Harrisburg one of many primary hubs in its system, and operates two intermodal (rail/truck transfer) yards in the immediate Harrisburg area. The Harrisburg Intermodal Yard (formerly called Lucknow Yard) is located approximately three miles north of downtown Harrisburg and the Harrisburg Transport Center, while the Rutherford Intermodal Yard is located approximately six miles east of downtown Harrisburg in Swatara Township, Dauphin County. Norfolk Southern also operates a significant classification yard in the Harrisburg area, the Enola Yard, which is located across the Susquehanna River from Harrisburg in East Pennsboro Township, Cumberland County.

==== Intercity passenger rail ====
Amtrak provides service to and from Harrisburg. The passenger rail operator runs its Keystone Service and Pennsylvanian routes between New York, Philadelphia, and the Harrisburg Transportation Center daily. The Pennsylvanian route, which operates once daily, continues west to Pittsburgh. As of April 2007, Amtrak operates 14 weekday roundtrips and 8 weekend roundtrips daily between Harrisburg, Lancaster, and 30th Street Station in Philadelphia; most of these trains also travel to and from New York Penn Station. The Keystone Corridor between Harrisburg and Philadelphia was improved in the mid-first decade of the 21st century, with the primary improvements completed in late 2006. The improvements included upgrading the electrical catenary, installing continuously welded rail, and replacing existing wooden railroad ties with concrete ties. These improvements increased train speeds to 110 mph along the corridor and reduced the travel time between Harrisburg and Philadelphia to as little as 95 minutes. It also eliminated the need to change locomotives at 30th Street Station from diesel to electric and vice versa for trains continuing to or coming from New York City.

As of 2008, the Harrisburg Transportation Center was the 2nd busiest Amtrak station in Pennsylvania and 21st busiest in the United States.

=== Roads and bridges ===
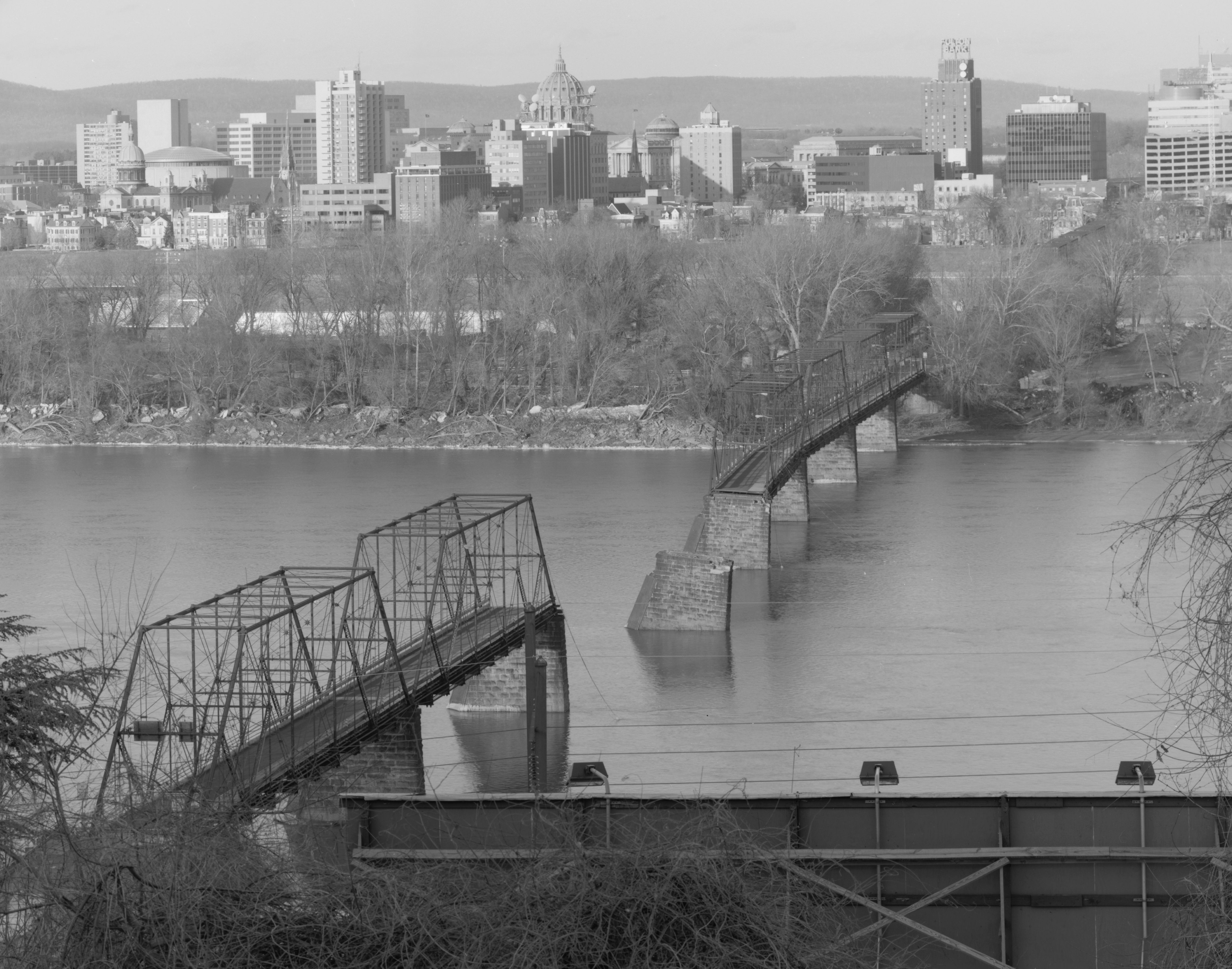
Walnut Street Bridge, which crosses the Susquehanna River, following its collapse during the 1996 blizzard

Harrisburg is served by several major highways, including Interstate 76 (I-76, Pennsylvania Turnpike), which passes south of the city and accesses two interchanges, running west to Pittsburgh and east to Philadelphia. I-81 passes to the north of Harrisburg and heads southwest toward Carlisle and northeast toward Hazleton. I-83 begins at I-81 near Harrisburg and heads south and west through the center of Harrisburg before continuing south toward York and Baltimore. I-283 connects I-76 and I-83 southeast of Harrisburg. U.S. Route 11 (US 11) and US 15 pass through the western suburbs of Harrisburg, heading north concurrently from Camp Hill up the west bank of the Susquehanna River toward Selinsgrove. South of Camp Hill, US 11 heads southwest toward Carlisle and US 15 heads south toward Gettysburg. US 22 and US 322 head northwest concurrently from Harrisburg toward Lewistown. US 22 passes through the northern portion of Harrisburg before it heads northeast toward Allentown. US 322 bypasses Harrisburg along I-81 and I-83 before heading east toward Hershey. Pennsylvania Route 230 (PA 230) heads south from US 22 in the northern part of Harrisburg and passes through the city along Cameron Street. PA 283 heads southeast from I-283 on a freeway toward Lancaster. PA 581 connects I-81 and I-83 on a freeway through the western suburbs of Harrisburg. I-81, I-83, and PA 581 form the Capital Beltway that circles Harrisburg.

Harrisburg is the location of over a dozen large bridges, many up to a mile long, that cross the Susquehanna River. Several other important structures span the Paxton Creek watershed and Cameron Street, linking Downtown with neighborhoods in East Harrisburg. These include the State Street Bridge, also known as the Soldiers and Sailor's Memorial Bridge, and the Mulberry Street Bridge. Walnut Street Bridge, now used only by pedestrians and cyclists, links the downtown and Riverfront Park areas with City Island but goes no further as spans are missing on its western side due to massive flooding resulting from the North American blizzard of 1996.

== Education ==
=== Public schools ===
Harrisburg is served by the Harrisburg School District. The school district provides education for the city's youth beginning with all-day kindergarten through twelfth grade. In 2003, SciTech High, a regional math and science magnet school affiliated with Harrisburg University, opened its doors to local students.

Public Charter Schools

The city also has several public charter schools: Infinity Charter School, Sylvan Heights Science Charter School, Premier Arts and Science Charter School, and Capital Area School for the Arts.

The Central Dauphin School District, the largest public school district in the Harrisburg–Carlisle metropolitan statistical area and the 13th-largest in Pennsylvania, has several Harrisburg postal addresses for many of the District's schools. Steelton-Highspire School District borders much of the Harrisburg School District.

=== Private schools ===
Harrisburg is home to an extensive Catholic educational system. There are nearly 40 parish-driven elementary schools and seven Catholic high schools within the region administered by the Roman Catholic Diocese of Harrisburg, including Bishop McDevitt High School and Trinity High School. Numerous other private schools, such as The Londonderry School and The Circle School, which is a Sudbury Model school, also operate in Harrisburg. Harrisburg Academy, founded in 1784, is one of the oldest independent college preparatory schools in the nation. The Rabbi David L. Silver Yeshiva Academy, founded in 1944, is a progressive, modern Jewish day school. Also, Harrisburg is home to Harrisburg Christian School, founded in 1955.

Private Schools in Harrisburg
School	Grades	Type	Location
Alternative Rehabilitation Communities	7–12	Alternative	2742 North Front Street
Bishop McDevitt High School	9–12	Religious	1 Crusader Way
Cathedral Consolidated School	PK-8	Religious	212 State Street
Cornell Abraxas Group	7–12		2950 North 7th Street
Covenant Christian Academy	NS-12	Religious	1982 Locust Lane
East Shore Montessori School	NS	Montessori	6130 Old Jonestown Road
Follow Me Christian Child Care Center	PK-1	Religious	6003 Jonestown Road
Hansel & Gretel Early Learning Center	PK-K	Preschool	4820 Londonderry Road
Harrisburg Adventist School	NS-9	Religious	424 North Progress Avenue
Harrisburg Catholic Elementary School	PK-8	Religious	555 South 25th Street
Harrisburg Christian School	K-12	Religious	2000 Blue Mountain Parkway
Hildebrandt Learning Center	K	Preschool	1500 Elmerton Avenue
Hillside Seventh-day Adventist School	K-8	Religious	1301 Cumberland Street
Holy Name of Jesus School	NS-8	Religious	6190 Allentown Boulevard
Jonestown Road KinderCare	NS-PK	Preschool	6006 Jonestown Road
Little Learners Child Development Center	PK-K	Preschool	2300 Vartan Way
Londonderry Road KinderCare	NS-PK	Preschool	4075 Londonderry Road
Londonderry School	PK-8		1800 Bamberger Road
New Story School	K-12	Special Ed	2700 Commerce Drive
Rabbi David L. Silver Yeshiva Academy	PK-8	Religious	3301 North Front Street
St. Catherine Laboure School	PK-8	Religious	4020 Derry Street
St. Margaret Mary School	NS-8	Religious	2826 Herr Street
St. Stephen's Episcopal School	PK-8	Religious	215 North Front Street
Samuel School	PK-8	Religious	411 South 40th Street
Strawberry Garden Day Care Center	PK-K	Preschool	1616 Herr Street
Susquehanna Township KinderCare	NS-PK	Preschool	3701 Vartan Way
The Circle School	PK-12	Alternative	727 Wilhelm Road
The Goddard School	NS-K	Preschool	4397 Sturbridge Drive
The Nativity School of Harrisburg	6–8	Alternative	2135 North 6th Street
Wordsworth Academy	2–12	Special Ed	1745 North Cameron Street

=== Higher education ===
- The Association of Independent Colleges and Universities of Pennsylvania (AICUP), which represents 85 nonprofit colleges and 280,000 students, is headquartered in downtown Harrisburg.
- Dixon University Center (defunct), located in Uptown, was the office of Chancellor and the central headquarters of the Pennsylvania State System of Higher Education (PASSHE). With a total student enrollment 82,688 during the 2023–24 academic year, PASSHE is one of the largest university systems in the United States
- Harrisburg Area Community College: the original campus of the college, the Harrisburg Campus, and Penn Center and Midtown campus which are branches of the Harrisburg Campus are located in Harrisburg. Newer campuses are located in Gettysburg, Lancaster, Lebanon and York
- Harrisburg University of Science and Technology, located Downtown
- Messiah College's Harrisburg Institute, located Downtown
- Penn State Harrisburg Eastgate Center, located Downtown
- Temple University Harrisburg Campus, located Downtown
- Widener University Commonwealth Law School

=== Libraries ===
- Dauphin County Law Library
- Dauphin County Library System, with eight branches in Harrisburg and suburban Dauphin County
- McCormick Library of Harrisburg Area Community College
- Harrisburg University Library
- Penn State Harrisburg Library
- State Library of Pennsylvania, which includes the Pennsylvania Law Library
- Medical library services of UPMC Pinnacle
- Law Library, Widener University School of Law

== Notable people ==
Since the early 18th century, Harrisburg has been home to many people of note. Because it is the seat of government for the state and lies relatively close to other urban centers, Harrisburg has played a significant role in the nation's political, cultural and industrial history. "Harrisburgers" have also taken a leading role in the development of Pennsylvania's history for over two centuries. Two former U.S. Secretaries of War, Simon Cameron and Alexander Ramsey and several other prominent political figures, such as former speaker of the house Newt Gingrich, hail from Harrisburg. The actor Don Keefer was born near Harrisburg, along with the actor Richard Sanders, most famous for playing Les Nessman in WKRP in Cincinnati. Many notable individuals are interred at Harrisburg Cemetery and East Harrisburg Cemetery.

=== Actors ===
- Matt Cook, television, actor Man with a Plan
- John A. Ellsler (1821–1903), actor and theater manager, born in Harrisburg
- Nancy Kulp, actress
- Eric Mabius, actor Ugly Betty
- Mark Malkoff, comedian and filmmaker
- Eric Martsolf, actor and singer
- Pauline Moore, actress
- Kimberly Peirce, filmmaker
- Ciara Renée, actress
- Richard Sanders, actor

=== Artists, designers ===
- Grafton Tyler Brown, first African American artist to create works depicting the Pacific Northwest and California
- Stephanie A. Johnson (born 1952), mixed media artist, educator
- Rachel Nabors, cartoonist
- Barbara Tyson Mosley (born 1950) American mixed media artist.

=== Musicians ===
- Glenn Branca, avant-garde composer and guitarist
- Justin Duerr, musician and artist
- James Allen Gähres, music conductor
- Gene "Birdlegg" Pittman, blues harmonicist, singer and songwriter.
- Rudi Protrudi, rock musician
- Bobby Troup, actor, jazz pianist, and songwriter
- Robert White, musician

=== Politics, military, activism ===
- Betty Andujar, first Republican woman to serve in Texas State Senate (1973–1983), was born in Harrisburg in 1912
- David Conner, U.S. Navy commodore
- Candace Gingrich, civil rights activist
- Newt Gingrich, U.S. Representative 1979–99, Speaker of the House; born in Harrisburg.
- Nicholas P. Kafkalas, US Army major general
- Charles P. Mason, Vice admiral in the Navy during World War II and Navy Cross recipient
- Daniel C. Miller, Harrisburg City Controller
- Bruce I. Smith, state representative, Pennsylvania House of Representatives
- George W. Smith, Major General in the Marine Corps
- William Trickett Smith, lawyer and the former chairman of the Dauphin County Republican Party
- Edward J. Stackpole, newspaper publisher, author, U.S. Army major general
- Perry A. Stambaugh, member of the Pennsylvania House of Representatives, District 86
- Robert J. Stevenson, actor and politician, born 1915 in Harrisburg, Los Angeles City Council member
- Donald A. Stroh, U.S. Army major general, born in Harrisburg
- M. Harvey Taylor, Pennsylvania State Senator
- LeRoy Zimmerman, 40th Attorney General of Pennsylvania
- Riley Williams – neo-nazi, January 6 United States Capitol attack defendant

=== Sports ===
- Les Bell, baseball player for 1926 World Series champion St. Louis Cardinals
- Jennifer Brady, tennis player
- Gilbert Brown (born 1987), basketball player for Ironi Nahariya of the Israeli Basketball Premier League
- Bruce Brubaker, baseball player for the Los Angeles Dodgers and Milwaukee Brewers
- Marques Colston, wide receiver for the New Orleans Saints
- Larry Conjar, NFL player
- Phil Davis, UFC fighter
- Barney Ewell, Olympic gold medalist in National Track and Field Hall of Fame
- Hyleas Fountain, Olympic Games heptathlete
- Garry Gilliam, NFL player
- Dennis Green, head coach NFL teams the Minnesota Vikings and the Arizona Cardinals
- Scott Hilton, NFL player
- Ray Isom, former professional football player, Tampa Bay Buccaneers
- Rickey Isom, former professional football player, Miami Dolphins
- Jimmy Jones, CFL player
- Danny Lansanah, professional football player, Green Bay Packers
- Jeremy Linn, swimmer, gold and 2x-silver medalist at 1996 Summer Olympics and former world and American record holder
- Connor Maloney, professional soccer player
- LeSean McCoy, former professional football player, Buffalo Bills and Philadelphia Eagles
- LeRon McCoy, former professional football player, Arizona Cardinals, San Francisco 49ers, Houston Texans, and the California Redwoods of the United Football League (2009-2012)
- Jeffrey B. Miller, Head of Security for the National Football League
- Kevin Mitchell, former NFL linebacker and Super Bowl winner
- Micah Parsons, linebacker for the Green Bay Packers
- Jim Price, baseball player and broadcaster
- Ed Ruth, three-time NCAA collegiate wrestling champion (2012–2014), mixed martial artist fighter
- Robert Tate, NFL cornerback for Minnesota Vikings, Baltimore Ravens, Arizona Cardinals
- Ricky Watters, NFL running back, Pro Bowl selection and Super Bowl winner
- Jan White, NFL player
- Kris Wilson, professional football player, Baltimore Ravens, Kansas City Chiefs, and San Diego Chargers

=== Writers ===
- Viet Thanh Nguyen, Pulitzer Prize-winning author and professor best known for the novel-turned-HBO series The Sympathizer, lived in Harrisburg until 1978.
- James Boyd, a resident of Front Street, wrote a novel about the city in 1935, Roll River.
- Thomas Morris Chester, prominent Black journalist, lawyer, and soldier in the Civil War, was born here.
- Carmen Finestra, television producer and writer.
- Jimmy Gownley, New York Times best-selling author and illustrator of Amelia Rules!.
- Kerry Shawn Keys, poet, writer, playwright, and translator.
- John O'Hara, author, a native of Pottsville, lived in Harrisburg briefly to write his novel about the city, A Rage to Live.
- Adam Resnick, comedic author, wrote about growing up in Harrisburg in his book Will Not Attend, and wrote the screenplay for Lucky Numbers (2000), a film taking place in Harrisburg.
- Will Stanton, long-published humor writer.
- John Wyeth, publisher of Wyeth's Repository of Sacred Music (1810; Second Part 1813).

=== Others ===
- James Milnor Coit, teacher
- Carl Cover, aviation pioneer and test pilot
- Lindsay Czarniak, ESPN anchor
- Margaret B. Denning (1856–1935), missionary and temperance worker
- Ellen Greenberg (1983–2011), teacher, died either of suicide or homicide
- Alan Isaacman (born 1942), lawyer who argued Hustler Magazine v. Falwell before the Supreme Court of the United States
- Agnes Kemp (1823–1908), physician and temperance movement leader
- Clyde A. Lynch (1891–1950), president of Lebanon Valley College
- Kenneth W. Mack (born 1964, historian and professor at Harvard Law School
- Edward C. Malesic, Catholic Bishop of Cleveland
- Robert James Miller, US Army Special Forces, Medal of Honor recipient
- David C. Page (born 1956), biologist known for mapping the Y-chromosome
- Glenda Price, educator and former president of Marygrove College
- John Kunkel Small (1869–1938), botanist
- Frank Soday (1908–1984), chemist influential in development of alternative uses for synthetic fiber
- Dan Wilson (PhD 2020), biologist and science communicator

== See also ==
- List of cities and towns along the Susquehanna River
- List of hospitals in Harrisburg
- USS Harrisburg (LPD-30)
