= Flag of Harrisburg, Pennsylvania =

City of Harrisburg
- Flag of Harrisburg, Pennsylvania
- Use: Other
- Proportion: 3:4
- Adopted: April 1907
- Designed by: unknown

The city flag of Harrisburg, Pennsylvania, consists of a blue field and yellow border with the city emblem centered in the middle of the flag. The emblem should not be confused with the city seal or official logo. The flag emblem consists of a white keystone with a red border, and incorporates the capitol dome which denotes the city's significance as the state capital of the Commonwealth of Pennsylvania.

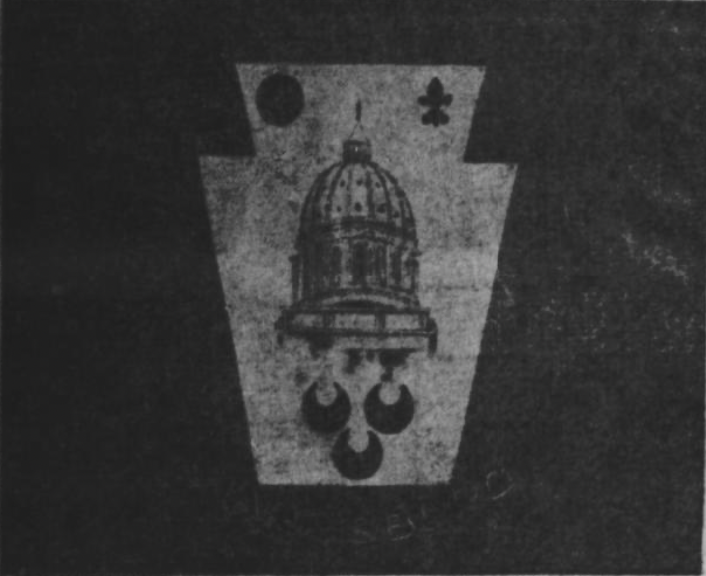
Citie's flag from 1918

Harrisburg went years without a flag until its invitation to the Jamestown Tercentennial Exposition in 1907, whereby Mayor Edward Z. Gross proposed a design contest for a flag. The Harrisburg Patriot printed a call for a flag that was "simple and dignified."

1917 While Hotel Pennsylvania in New York City a was under construction unique flag was made for the lobby. It featured a blue field with the state coat of arms in the center, and underneath it the words: “Penn-Harris.”

The current flag was slightly updated sometime in 1991 from the original, but maintains the same principle design. An alternative flag with the City's emblem additionally came into use after Harrisburg received the All-America City Award given by the National Civic League in 1984-85 and again in 1990. That alternative flag used the same emblem, but added circular All-American City designation as well and can still be seen today as a logo on public trash bins in the city.
