= List of cities and towns along the Susquehanna River =

This is a list of cities and towns along the Susquehanna River and its branches in the United States, in the states of New York, Pennsylvania, and Maryland. These communities and their surroundings are collectively referred to as the Susquehanna Valley.

== Susquehanna River ==
| Geographic index | Branch | Place | State |
|---|---|---|---|
| 1 | North | Cooperstown | New York |
| 2 | North | Milford (town) | New York |
| 3 | North | Oneonta | New York |
| 4 | North | Otego (town) | New York |
| 5 | North | Otego (village) | New York |
| 6 | North | Franklin (village) | New York |
| 7 | North | Unadilla (village) | New York |
| 8 | North | Sidney (village) | New York |
| 9 | North | Bainbridge | New York |
| 10 | North | Afton (village) | New York |
| 11 | North | Colesville | New York |
| 12 | North | Windsor (town) | New York |
| 13 | North | Windsor (village) | New York |
| 14 | North | Lanesboro | Pennsylvania |
| 15 | North | Susquehanna Depot | Pennsylvania |
| 16 | North | Hallstead | Pennsylvania |
| 17 | North | Great Bend | Pennsylvania |
| 18 | North | Conklin | New York |
| 19 | North | Kirkwood | New York |
| 20 | North | Binghamton | New York |
| 21 | North | Johnson City | New York |
| 22 | North | Endwell | New York |
| 23 | North | Endicott | New York |
| 24 | North | Vestal | New York |
| 25 | North | Apalachin | New York |
| 26 | North | Owego | New York |
| 27 | North | Tioga | New York |
| 28 | North | Nichols (town) | New York |
| 29 | North | Nichols (village) | New York |
| 30 | North | Barton | New York |
| 31 | North | Waverly, Tioga County | New York |
| 32 | North | Sayre | Pennsylvania |
| 33 | North | Athens | Pennsylvania |
| 34 | North | Towanda | Pennsylvania |
| 35 | North | Wyalusing | Pennsylvania |
| 36 | North | Tunkhannock | Pennsylvania |
| 37 | North | Pittston | Pennsylvania |
| 38 | North | West Pittston | Pennsylvania |
| 39 | North | Exeter | Pennsylvania |
| 40 | North | Wyoming | Pennsylvania |
| 41 | North | Forty Fort | Pennsylvania |
| 42 | North | Wilkes-Barre | Pennsylvania |
| 43 | North | Kingston | Pennsylvania |
| 44 | North | Larksville | Pennsylvania |
| 45 | North | Plymouth | Pennsylvania |
| 46 | North | Plymouth Township, Luzerne County | Pennsylvania |
| 47 | North | Hanover Township, Luzerne County | Pennsylvania |
| 48 | North | Nanticoke | Pennsylvania |
| 49 | North | Shickshinny | Pennsylvania |
| 50 | North | Nescopeck | Pennsylvania |
| 51 | North | Berwick | Pennsylvania |
| 52 | North | Briar Creek | Pennsylvania |
| 53 | North | Mifflinville | Pennsylvania |
| 54 | North | Lime Ridge | Pennsylvania |
| 55 | North | Almedia | Pennsylvania |
| 56 | North | Espy | Pennsylvania |
| 57 | North | Bloomsburg | Pennsylvania |
| 58 | North | Rupert | Pennsylvania |
| 59 | North | Catawissa | Pennsylvania |
| 60 | North | Danville | Pennsylvania |
| 61 | North | Riverside | Pennsylvania |
| 62 | Main | Northumberland | Pennsylvania |
| 63 | Main | Sunbury | Pennsylvania |
| 64 | Main | Shamokin Dam | Pennsylvania |
| 65 | Main | Selinsgrove | Pennsylvania |
| 66 | Main | Herndon | Pennsylvania |
| 67 | Main | Port Trevorton | Pennsylvania |
| 68 | Main | Liverpool | Pennsylvania |
| 69 | Main | Millersburg | Pennsylvania |
| 70 | Main | Halifax | Pennsylvania |
| 71 | Main | New Buffalo | Pennsylvania |
| 72 | Main | Duncannon | Pennsylvania |
| 73 | Main | Dauphin | Pennsylvania |
| 74 | Main | Marysville | Pennsylvania |
| 75 | Main | Enola | Pennsylvania |
| 76 | Main | West Fairview | Pennsylvania |
| 77 | Main | Harrisburg | Pennsylvania |
| 78 | Main | Wormleysburg | Pennsylvania |
| 79 | Main | Lemoyne | Pennsylvania |
| 80 | Main | New Cumberland | Pennsylvania |
| 81 | Main | Steelton | Pennsylvania |
| 82 | Main | Highspire | Pennsylvania |
| 83 | Main | Middletown, Dauphin County | Pennsylvania |
| 84 | Main | Royalton | Pennsylvania |
| 85 | Main | Goldsboro | Pennsylvania |
| 86 | Main | York Haven | Pennsylvania |
| 87 | Main | Marietta | Pennsylvania |
| 88 | Main | Columbia | Pennsylvania |
| 89 | Main | Wrightsville | Pennsylvania |
| 90 | Main | Pequea | Pennsylvania |
| 91 | Main | Conowingo | Maryland |
| 92 | Main | Port Deposit | Maryland |
| 93 | Main | Perryville | Maryland |
| 94 | Main | Havre de Grace | Maryland |

== West Branch Susquehanna River ==
| Geographic index | Branch | Place | State |
|---|---|---|---|
| 201 | West | Elmora | Pennsylvania |
| 202 | West | Northern Cambria | Pennsylvania |
| 203 | West | Cherry Tree | Pennsylvania |
| 204 | West | Burnside | Pennsylvania |
| 205 | West | Mahaffey | Pennsylvania |
| 206 | West | Curwensville | Pennsylvania |
| 207 | West | Clearfield | Pennsylvania |
| 208 | West | Karthaus | Pennsylvania |
| 209 | West | Keating | Pennsylvania |
| 210 | West | Renovo | Pennsylvania |
| 211 | West | South Renovo | Pennsylvania |
| 212 | West | Lock Haven | Pennsylvania |
| 213 | West | Avis | Pennsylvania |
| 214 | West | Jersey Shore | Pennsylvania |
| 215 | West | Duboistown | Pennsylvania |
| 216 | West | Williamsport | Pennsylvania |
| 217 | West | South Williamsport | Pennsylvania |
| 218 | West | Montoursville | Pennsylvania |
| 219 | West | Muncy | Pennsylvania |
| 220 | West | Montgomery | Pennsylvania |
| 221 | West | Watsontown | Pennsylvania |
| 222 | West | Milton | Pennsylvania |
| 223 | West | Lewisburg | Pennsylvania |
