= Press and Journal (Pennsylvania) =

Newspaper

- Type: Weekly newspaper
- Owner: Joseph Sukle
- Publisher: Press and Journal, Inc.
- Editor-in-chief: Marlene Lang
- Founded: 1854
- Ceased publication: 2020
- Headquarters: Middletown, Pennsylvania
- Circulation: 8,100 (as of 2009)
- Website: pressandjournal.com

The Press and Journal was a weekly newspaper which served Dauphin County, Pennsylvania in the United States. It was owned by Joe and Louise Sukle.

It had a circulation of approximately 8,000 copies in the Highspire, Hummelstown, Londonderry Township, Lower Swatara Township, Middletown, and Royalton.

== History ==
The newspaper was founded in 1854.

In July 2020, the newspaper ceased its operations.

== See also ==
- List of newspapers in Pennsylvania
