= Riverfront Park (Harrisburg) =

Park in Harrisburg, Pennsylvania, United States

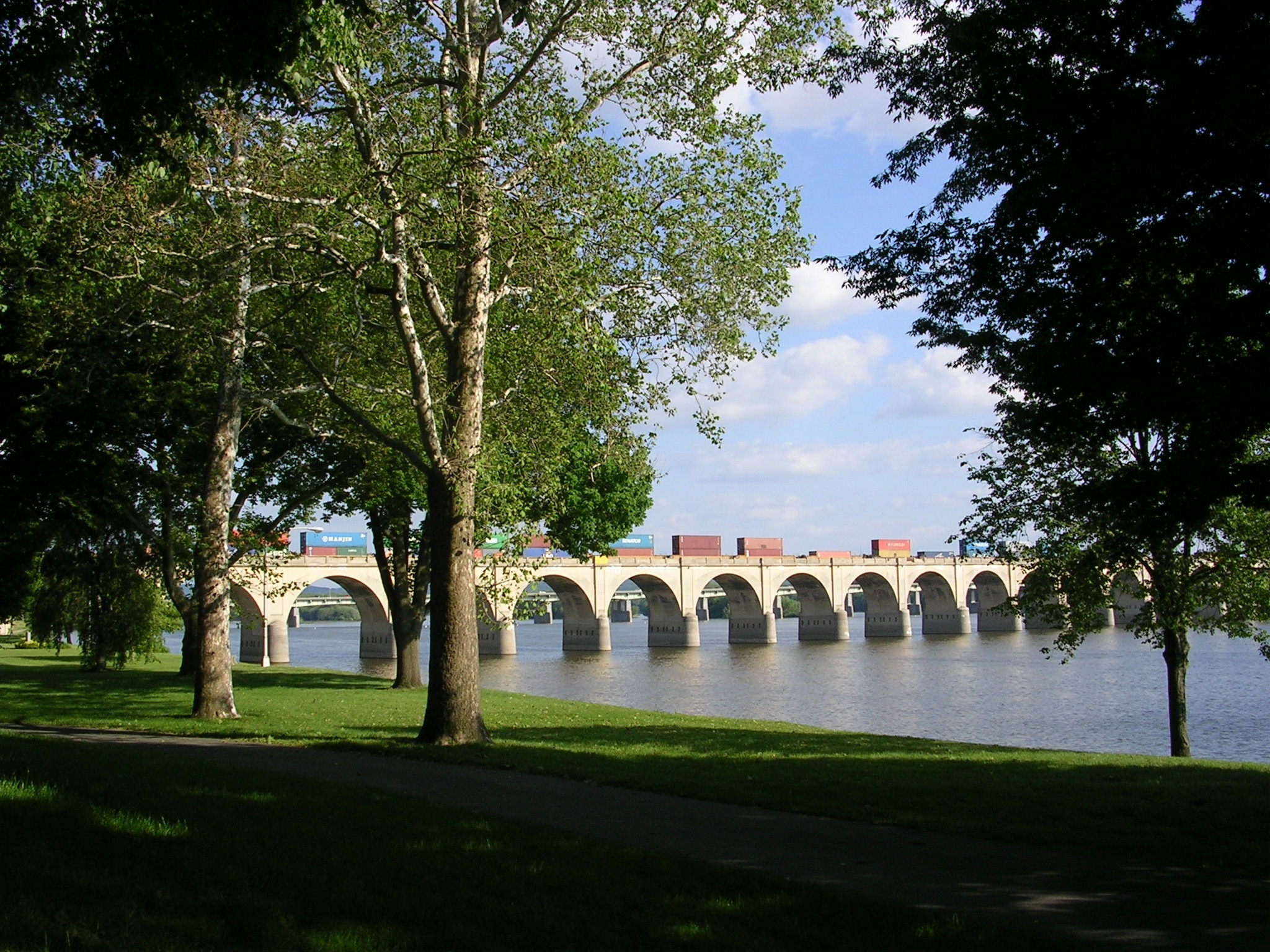
- Facing west toward the Susquehanna River with a view of the Philadelphia & Reading Railroad Bridge
- Interactive map of Riverfront Park
- Location: Harrisburg, Pennsylvania
- Coordinates: 40.2674°N 76.8925°W
- Area: approx. 47.88 acres (19.38 ha)
- Established: 1912

Riverfront Park is a public park in Harrisburg, Pennsylvania that spans beside the Susquehanna River.

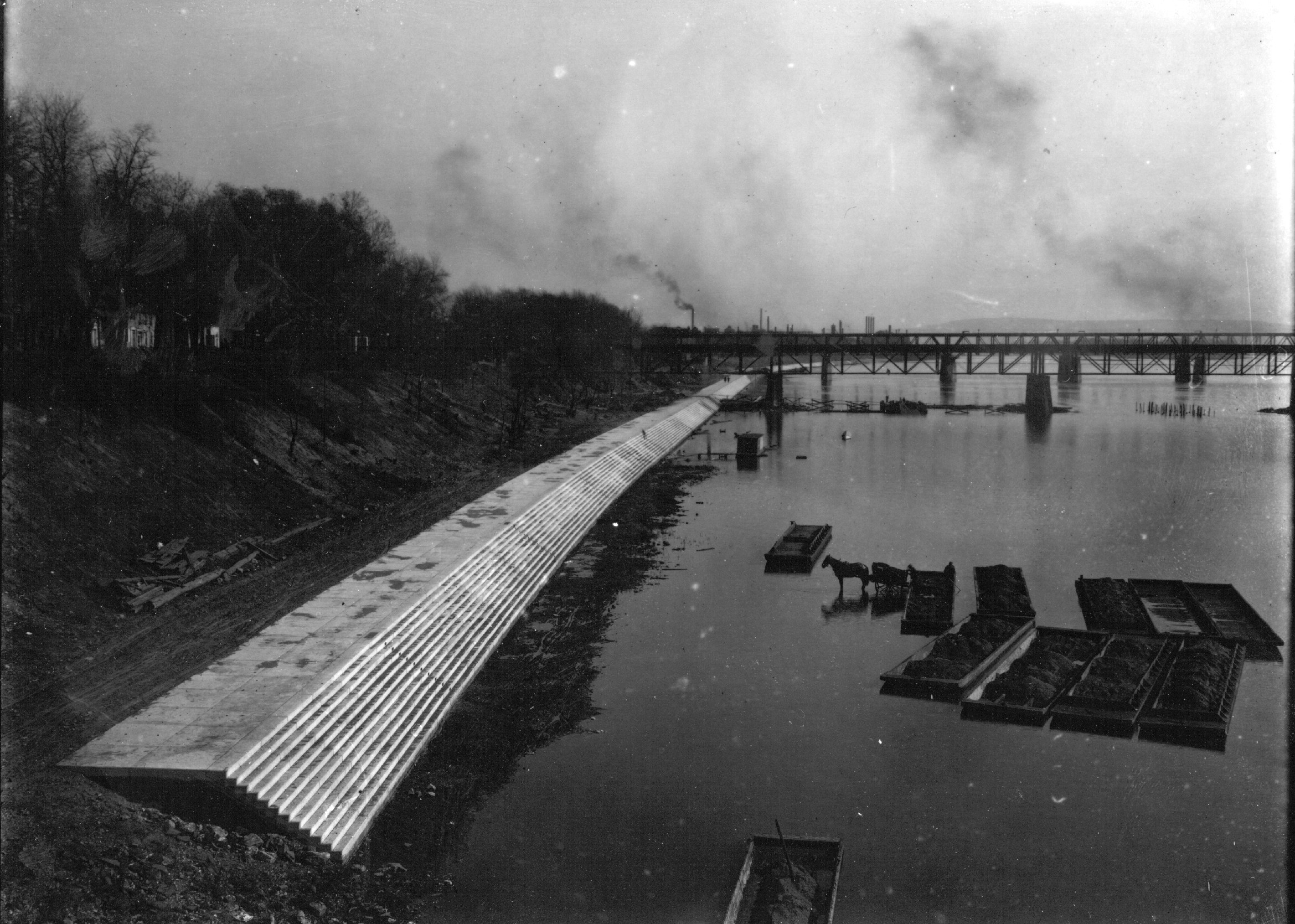
Front Steps from Market Street Bridge looking south during construction of Riverfront Park, November 1914.

The park runs parallel to the Susquehanna River between the shoreline and Front Street, from Vaughn Street at the north to the I-83 John Harris Bridge at the south. It includes a concrete waterfront esplanade as well as greenspace on the riverbank first developed during the City Beautiful Movement in the early 20th Century by Warren H. Manning as one of the first riverfront reclamations by American cities. Riverfront Park overlooks views of the river, City Island, Wormleysburg and Blue Mountain in the distance. Riverfront Park is also part of the larger Capital Area Greenbelt and maintains bike lanes and paved paths. Along the park are many statues, memorials, a series of exercise pits, gardens, public art installations, and a Harrisburg Centennial time capsule. Special areas include the Sunken Gardens, gravesite of John Harris Sr., and Kunkel Memorial Plaza.

== Festivals and events ==
Riverfront Park plays host to many of Harrisburg's yearly festivals and events such as Kipona, Harrisburg Independence Day Celebration, ArtsFest, Woofstock Dog Festival, Pennsylvania Pump Primers' Antique Fire Apparatus Show & Muster, and the Pride Festival of Central PA.

== Memorials ==
Memorial	Dedicated
Holocaust Memorial for the Commonwealth of Pennsylvania	1994
PennDOT Workers' Memorial	2002
World War I Buddy Monument	1922
Women's World War I Memorial	Unknown
POW-MIA Monument	Unknown
Vietnam Veterans Monument	1986
Dr. Charles B. Fager Jr. Memorial (Principal of Harrisburg Technical High School)	1984
Firefighters' Memorial	1924
Submarine Veterans Memorial	Unknown
Workers Memorial/AFL–CIO	1990
City Beautiful Movement	1991
