= City Island (Pennsylvania) =

- Area of Harrisburg
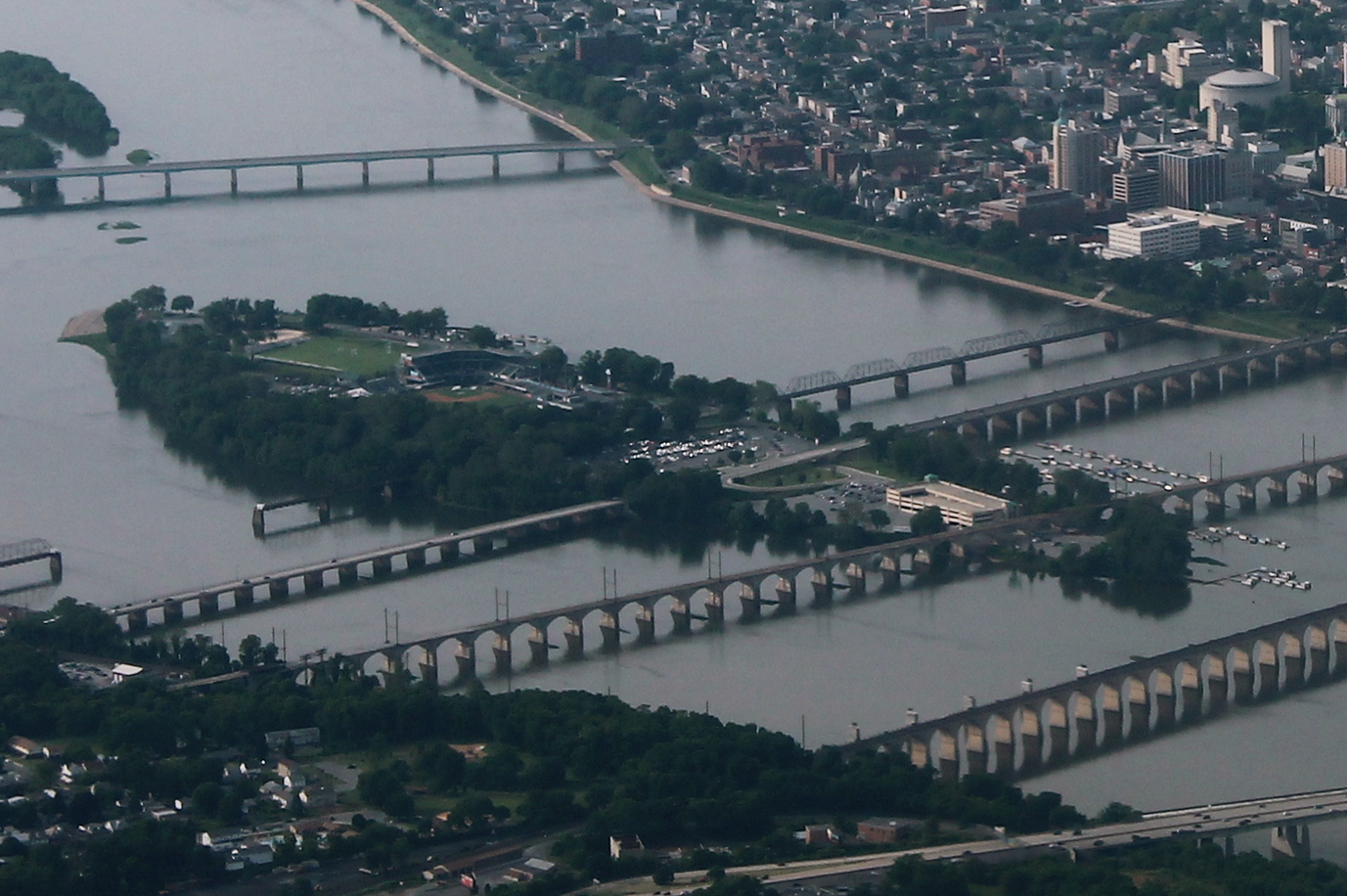
- Aerial view looking North toward City Island, 2016
- Interactive map of City Island
- Coordinates: 40.255089°N 76.888029°W
- Country: United States
- State: Pennsylvania
- County: Dauphin County
- City: Harrisburg

Area
  - Land: 63 acres (25 ha)
- ZIP Code: 17101
- Area codes: 717 and 223

City Island is a mile-long island in the Susquehanna River between Harrisburg and Wormleysburg, Pennsylvania in the United States. It is used mainly for leisure and sports activities. Its previous names have included Turkey Island, Maclay's Island, Forster's Island and Hargast Island. The island can be reached from either side of the Susquehanna River by Market Street Bridge or, from the Harrisburg side and by pedestrians and cyclists only, by Walnut Street Bridge.

== History ==
The island contains archaeological remains of the Susquehannocks and the Iroquois tribes, who at one time established seasonal settlements here. During the initial development of Harrisburg, the island was only able to be reached by boat or fording in low waters, until 1817 when the Camelback Bridge, site of the present-day Market Street Bridge, was completed.

During the American Civil War, Camp Necessity was formed on City Island in 1863 for Union troops to stage additional defense as Confederate troops threatened invasion of the area during the Gettysburg campaign. Then in 1865, Camp Keystone was formed on the island, as Camp Curtin was overflowing with returning troops.

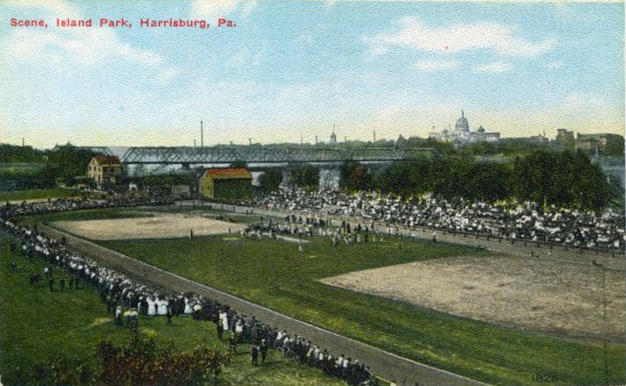
Postcard depicting Island Park ballfield and track field located south of the Market Street Bridge, c. 1910

Though originally used for truck farming, amateur games of baseball were played here as early as the 1880s. In 1903, the Harrisburg Athletics professional baseball team and Harrisburg Giants Negro league arrived at Island Park on City Island. Satchel Paige played games at Island Park through the Negro leagues, which were held on the island through 1957. The original Harrisburg Senators played in the Eastern League starting in 1924. Playing its home games at Island Field, the team won the league championship in the 1927, 1928, and 1931 seasons. Babe Ruth famously played a game at Island Park in 1928 when the New York Yankees came to Harrisburg to scrimmage against the original Senators. The Senators played a few more seasons before flood waters destroyed Island Field in 1936, effectively ending Eastern League participation for fifty-one years. In 1940, Harrisburg gained an Interstate League team affiliation with the Pittsburgh Pirates. However, the team remained in the city only until 1943, when it moved to nearby York and renamed the York Pirates.

With the onset of the City Beautiful Movement in the 1900s, the City Island Filtration Plant was constructed. The plant drew water from the river, filtered it into concrete reservoirs (which now define the edge of the Skyline Sports Complex), and pumped it by tunnel laid under the river to the Old Waterworks at Front and North Streets, which then pumped the water to the reservoirs up in Reservoir Park. The Flood of 1972 resulting from Hurricane Agnes destroyed the Filtration Plant, leaving the DeHart Dam to supply water to the city.

By the 1980s, concerts were held in the old field leftover from athletic events, such as Metallica (July 12, 1989) and Grateful Dead (June 22, 1983 and June 23, 1984). However, part of the field which was used for concerts would become the new Riverside Stadium (now FNB Field) in 1987.

== Layout and attractions ==
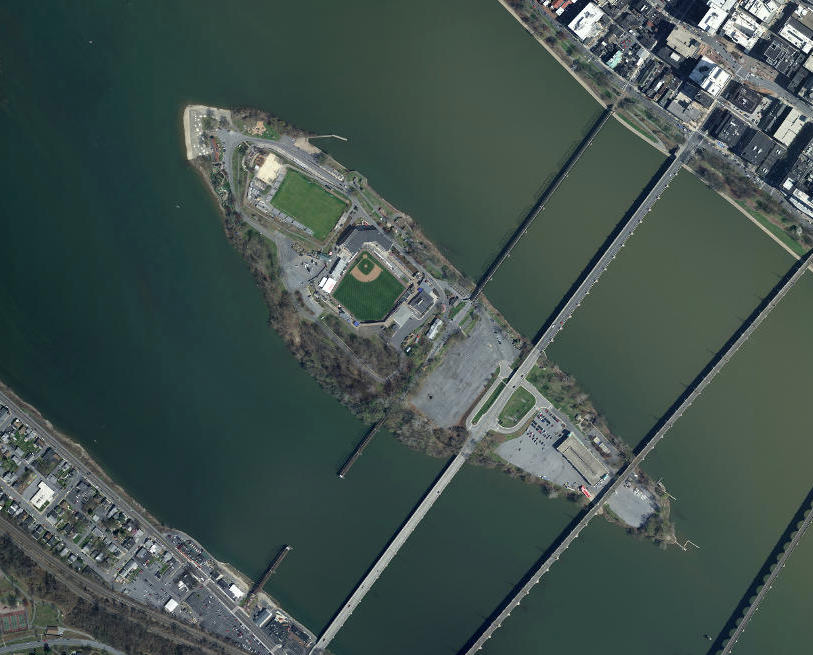
2018 PASDA Imagery of City Island

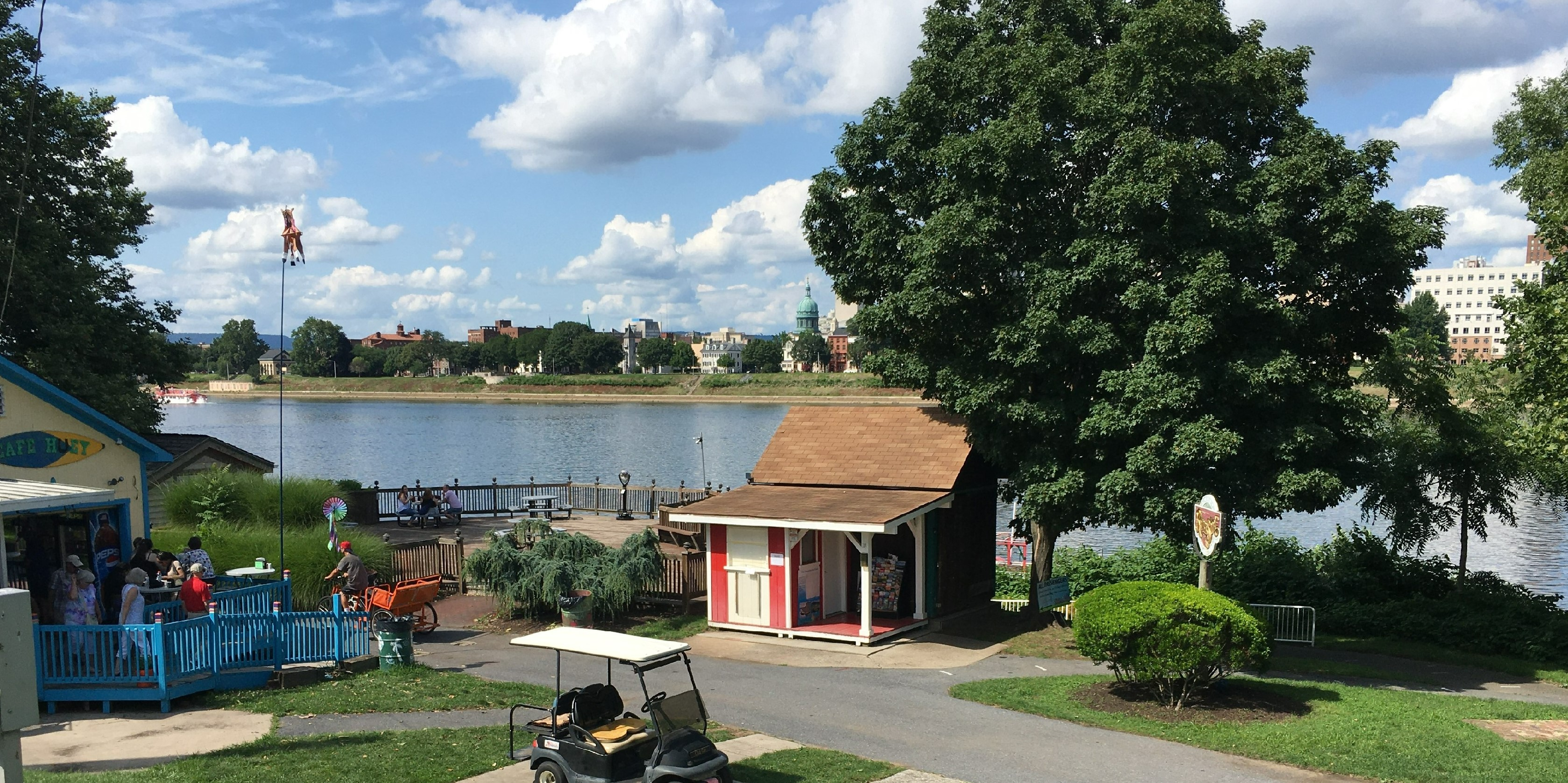
Cafe Huey, food vendor, July 2021

The Walnut Street Bridge (Harrisburg, Pennsylvania), known as "The People's Bridge", crosses the center of the island, once connecting the east and west shores of the Susquehanna, until ice floes damaged three spans on the western side of the bridge in 1996. The Market Street Bridge spans across the southern area of the island, under which are the parking areas. Most of the attractions are on the northern area of the island, where roads wind around the island.

The island is the site of FNB Field, the home of the Harrisburg Senators minor baseball team, and the former home of Penn FC, a professional soccer team. It also features the Skyline Sports Complex, which is the home of the Capital City Islanders, a nonprofit, semi-professional team which competes in the Northeast American (South) Division of the Premier League of the UPSL. The complex is open year-round to the public, and provides a multi-purpose sports field, sand volleyball courts, and a fitness center.

The island also provides family-based amusements such as the 2 ft (610 mm) narrow gauge City Island Railroad (complete with a Crown Metal Products steam locomotive), carousel, Pride of the Susquehanna paddle-wheel riverboat, horse-drawn carriage rides, miniature golf, a replica of John Harris Sr.'s fur-trading post, a riverside village-style playground, three boat marinas, and a concrete beach with a riverside bar, Harrisburg Beach Club.

== Events ==
The island is home to many events, including Harrisburg's Independence Day Celebration, Kipona Festival, Cultural Fest, Harrisburg Marathon, Armed Forces Day, Penguin Plunge and others.

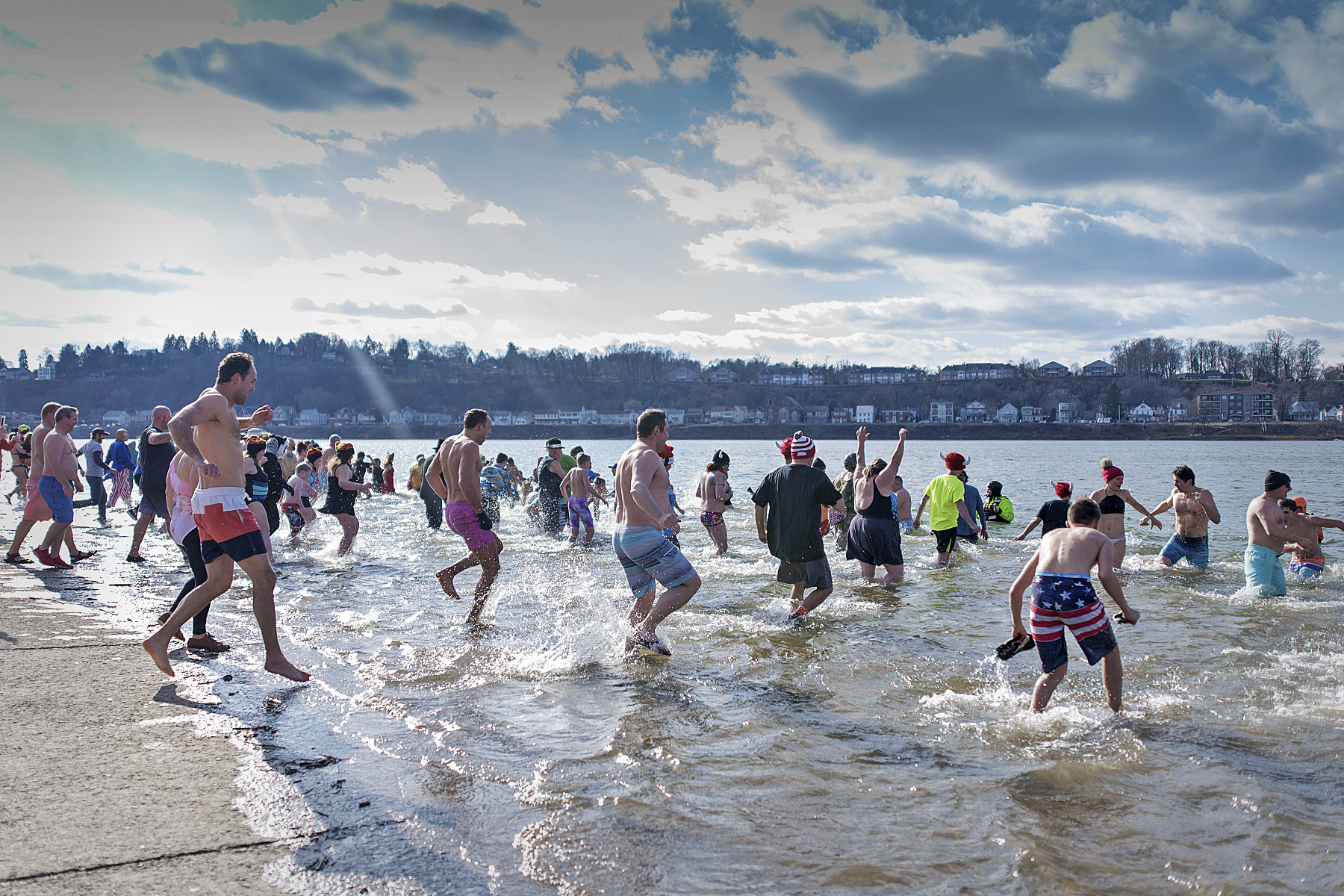
Participants jump in the Susquehanna River during the annual Penguin Plunge to raise money for the Humane Society of Harrisburg Area, January 2020

== Canceled projects ==
City Island was the proposed location of:

- A CorridorOne regional rail station (removed from the project in 2006).
- The National Sports Hall of Fame (canceled in 2009).
