= FNB Field =

Baseball park in Harrisburg, Pennsylvania

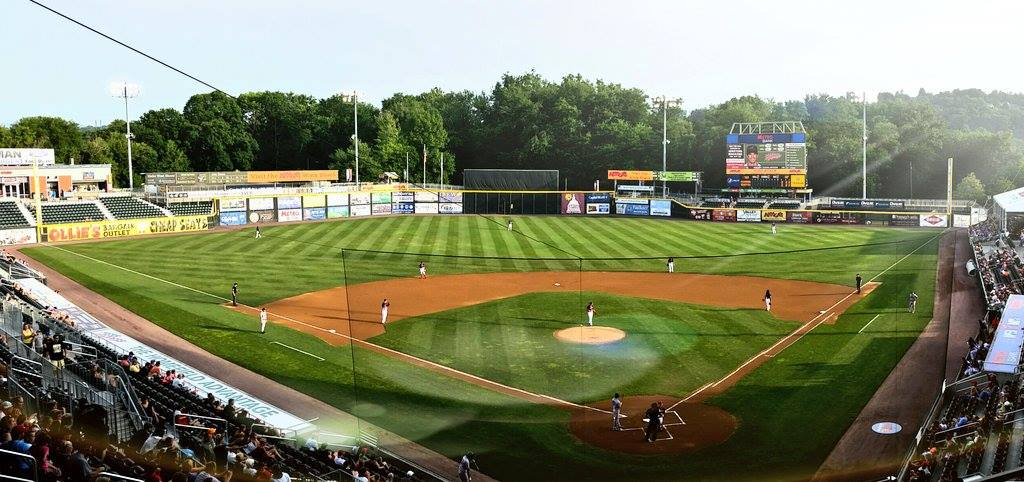

- Location within Pennsylvania Location within the United States
- Interactive map of FNB Field
- Former names: Riverside Stadium (1987–2004); Commerce Bank Park (2005–2009); Metro Bank Park (2009–2015)
- Address: 245 Champion Way; Harrisburg, PA 17101
- Coordinates: 40.256428°N 76.889977°W
- Owner: City of Harrisburg
- Operator: Harrisburg Senators Baseball Club, Inc
- Capacity: 6,187
- Surface: Kentucky bluegrass
- Field size: Left field: 325 ft (99.1 m); Left-center: 350 ft (106.7 m); Deep left-center: 405 ft (123.4 m); Center field: 400 ft (122 m); Deep right-center 405 ft (123.4 m); Right center: 380 ft (115.8 m); Right field: 325 ft (99.1 m)

Construction
- Groundbreaking: August 12, 1986
- Opened: April 11, 1987
- Renovated: 2009–2010
- Cost: $1.3 million ($3.68 million in 2025 dollars) $45 million renovation (2009–2010)
- Architects: HOK Sport; 360 Architecture (renovation)
- Services engineer: Brinjac Engineering
- General contractor: Miller Bros Construction Inc.

Tenants
- Harrisburg Senators (EL) 1987–present Penn FC (USL) 2016–2018

FNB Field is a baseball park in Harrisburg, Pennsylvania, on City Island in the Susquehanna River. It is the home field of the Harrisburg Senators, the Double-A Eastern League affiliate of the Washington Nationals, and was the home stadium of Penn FC of the USL. The original structure was built in 1987 and it was called Riverside Stadium until 2004. It has a capacity of 6,187. The ballpark received a $45 million renovation that began in 2008.

== History ==
FNB Field sits on the exact spot where baseball had been played earlier in the century, where other Harrisburg teams played from 1907 to 1952. The location, City Island, is a 62-acre waterfront park and sports complex. The facilities include volleyball courts, softball fields, a football/soccer field, water golf, nature tails, jogging paths, cycling paths, two marinas, the Pride of the Susquehanna paddlewheel riverboat, a food court called RiverSide Village, and a miniature train that runs around the island for tours.

The original ballpark is a steel and aluminum structure, and over the course of time, additional seating areas were built along first base, and box seats in foul territory and in front of the grandstands behind home plate to provide additional seating, despite official capacity being listed at over 6,000 since the park's inception. The stadium was used as the spring training facility in the movie Major League II, starring Charlie Sheen, Tom Berenger and Corbin Bernsen.

== Stadium renovation ==
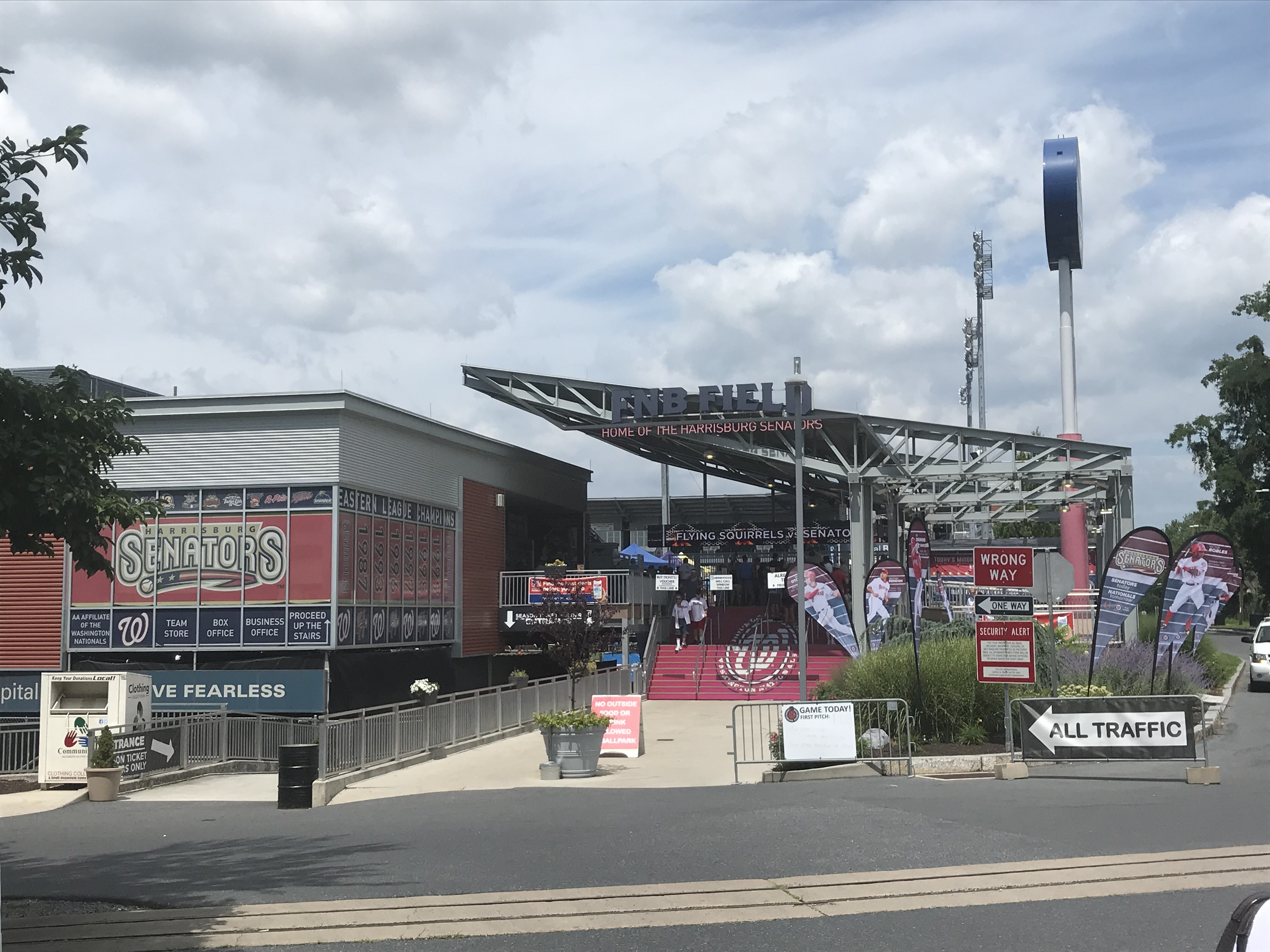
The main entrance to FNB Field

FNB Field received a $45 million renovation ($18 million in city funding). Originally the renovation was scheduled to begin in 2005. However, problems with the availability of state funding for the project pushed it back to 2008, with the transfer of ownership between the 2007 and 2008 seasons. The renovation project was finished in two phases, with the first phase being completed before Opening Day 2009. The second phase of the project began in August 2009 and was completed prior to Opening Day 2010.

The construction for the first phase of the project began in January 2009 and continued into April 2009. The changes and additions to FNB Field for the 2009 season were:

A public plaza and entrance was constructed in the left field corner; a boardwalk surrounding the outfield was constructed between the foul poles; a complete upgrade to the scoreboard; a new left field seating area; an outfield bar complete with drink rails; and new seating underneath the scoreboard; a new outfield wall constructed with static advertisement panels; and a new 8,600-square-foot (800 m^{2}) Operations Building which houses the Senators front offices, ranger, security, first aid and the new box office along with the new Senators souvenir store, concession stand, and public rest rooms.

The second phase of the construction project began in August 2009. This project included the comprehensive changes to FNB Field that turned the stadium on City Island into one of the best and most unusual ballparks in minor league baseball. The following is a comprehensive list of the renovation project:

- Complete new seating bowl upgrades with individual chair back seats replacing the bench seating
- Roofing covering the majority of the seating bowl
- Construction of 20 suites with amenities including a glass wall located in the front of the suite to see the field and a in the back of the suite to see the city skyline
- A new sound system
- Creation of a "Midway" with activities and specialty areas geared towards children, teenagers and families
- Completion of new concessions and restrooms on elevated concourses
- Upgraded picnic areas which effectively double the size of the stadium picnic facilities
- Reconfiguration of field lights including removal of two lights, addition of fixtures to remaining eight lights, re-lamp and re-aim of all lights, addition of quartz lighting bank for emergency purposes
- Upgrade of the field-level concourse with brick pavers
- Completion of the Operations Building by August 2009
- New press box including new media and scoreboard control rooms
- Complete renovation of existing buildings, including the home and visitors clubhouses and the restroom facilities
- Development of a reserved parking lot.

The total construction costs for the project were $32 million and the total development budget for the entire project, including all costs, was approximately $45 million. Prior to the 2005 season, a new playing surface was installed which is also a part of the $45 million total project cost.

In the 2008 off-season, the renovation of the stadium began, with $500,000 in funding going towards a new public plaza, and other small amenities to be built into the stadium. In the 2009 offseason, the rest of the stadium was renovated.

== Stadium dimensions ==
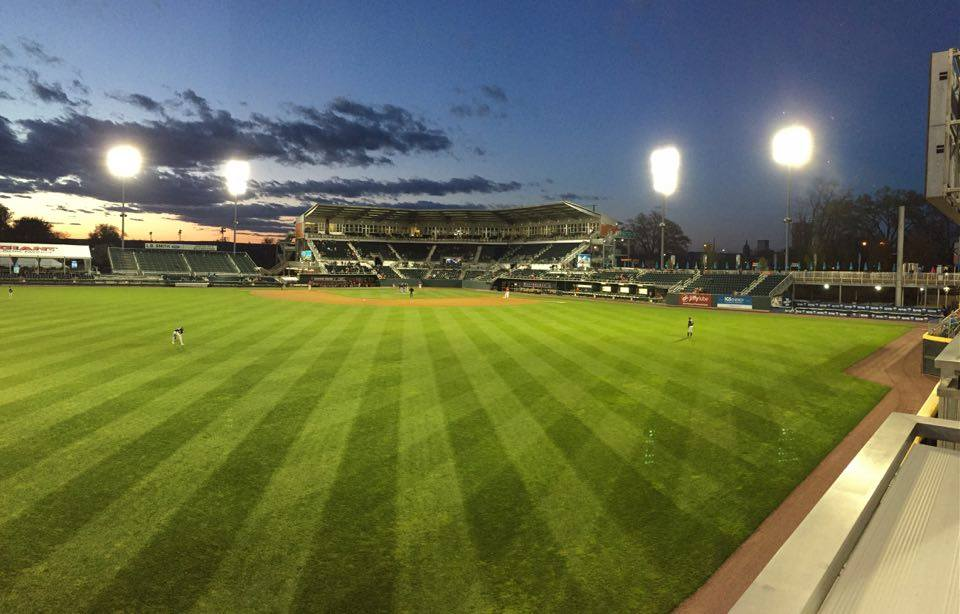
View of FNB Field from the outfield

The ballpark's original dimensions were fairly basic. The walls at the left and right field lines were 335 feet (102 m) from home plate, and the center field wall was 400 feet (120 m) from home plate, with the outfield wall pretty much the same setup that multi-purpose stadiums had in the 1980s (though FNB Field itself is not a multi-purpose stadium), with no extra bends or such in the wall, and the height of the wall at 8 feet (2.4 m). Billboards also ran around by the walls, and reached a height of 16 feet (4.9 m). Anything that hit the billboards was a home run. With the renovation of the park, and the addition of the boardwalk, some of the distances have changed, with left and right field now 325 feet from home plate. Center field's distance has stayed the same at 400 feet; however walls, unlike at left and right field, were raised to 16 feet instead of the original 8 feet, and the walls have extra bends that did not exist in the previous setup, predominantly in left center and right center field.

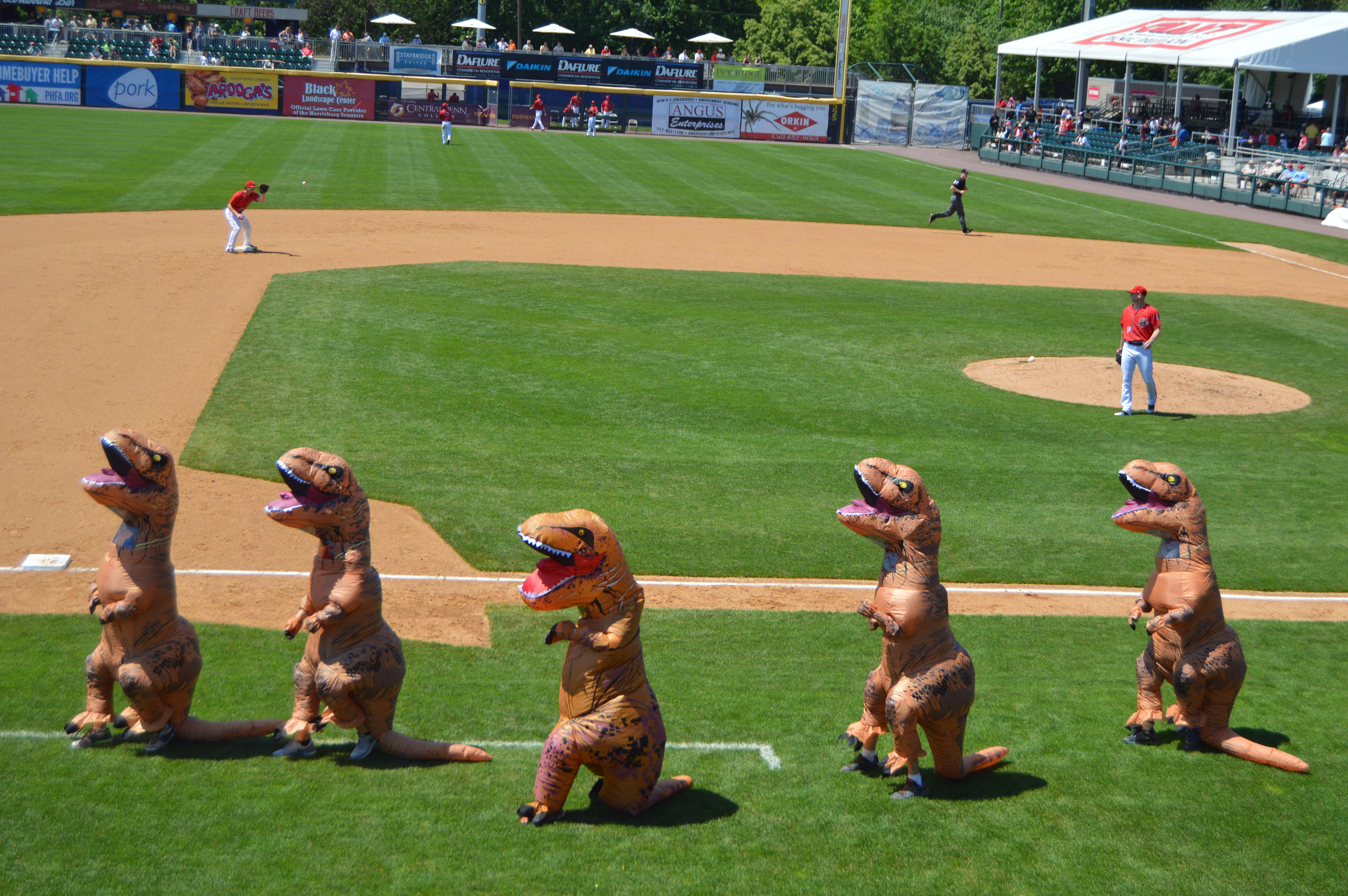
Dinosaur dance at FNB

Foul territory also currently varies, because there is a small amount of foul ground behind home plate. However, the further out toward the outfield, the wall on the foul ground stays somewhat parallel to the foul line in both left and right field, with only the box seats sticking out into foul ground helping to reduce the area somewhat. This was expected to change when the main grandstands are renovated in the 2009–2010 off-season. The bullpens were also located out in the foul territory by the outfield walls. While the visiting team's bullpen has stayed in the same place for the 2009 season, and is expected to be in the same general area for the 2010 season, the Senators moved their bullpen to a location behind the right field wall halfway through the season.

== Trivia ==
- Because of the location, FNB Field is prone to flooding and a previous stadium at the site was washed out by a flood in 1935. Floods in the winter do not pose as much of a problem, as the ballpark can be repaired and ready for the next season, but floods during the baseball season can (and usually will) affect the Senators' schedule, forcing them to play their "home games" usually at their opponent's ballpark. In the 2006 season, a flood partially submerged the field and forced the Senators to play two "home games" against the Bowie Baysox as a doubleheader in Bowie. The most recent episode of this was during the 2011 playoffs when a flood completely submerged the field and forced the Senators to play their first two playoff "home games" against the Richmond Flying Squirrels in Richmond. Even though the Senators had the best record in the Eastern League, they went on to lose all three games in Richmond and were eliminated from the playoffs.
- The record attendance at a Senators' game at FNB Field is 8,637, on September 1, 2011. The crowd was bolstered by a rehab start for Stephen Strasburg, while future Hall of Famer Iván Rodríguez caught for him, and the Senators' clinching of the division title.
