= Donna Lopiano =

American athletic director

Donna A. Lopiano (born September 11, 1946) is the President and founder of Sports Management Resources, a consulting firm that focuses on bringing the knowledge of experienced, expert former athletics directors to assist scholastic and collegiate athletics departments in solving growth and development challenges. She was the chief executive officer of the Women's Sports Foundation from 1992 to 2007 and focused on ensuring athletic departments throughout the nation were compliant with Title IX regulations.

== Early life and education ==
Donna Lopiano was born to Thomas and Josephine Sabia Lopiano, Italian immigrants living in Stamford Connecticut, on September 11, 1946. As a child, she loved to play baseball and even received a baseball glove from her parents as her First Holy Communion gift. She was the first pick at Stamford's Little League draft day, but was not allowed to play after a parent noted that the rulebook said girls could not participate. She completed a bachelor's degree in Physical Education from Southern Connecticut State University and a doctorate from the University of Southern California.

== Career ==
At the age of 16, she was offered the opportunity to play for the Connecticut Brakettes, a national championship women's softball team. During her ten year career with the Brakettes, she traveled to Europe and Asia and compiled a career record of 183–18. She delivered 1633 strikeouts in 817 innings, for an average of just under two per inning. She finished her Brakettes career in the top ten of several categories including hits, RBIs, runs and home runs. Overall, throughout her athletic career, she participated in 26 national championships in four sports and was a nine-time All-American at four different positions in softball.

Following her time as an athlete, Lopiano was hired as an assistant athletic director at Brooklyn College, where she also coached basketball, volleyball, and softball. In 1975, she became the first Director of Women's Athletics at the University of Texas. She remained at the university for seventeen years, though there was concern that she would be fired after only two weeks, after she testified against a proposed amendment to Title IX. The amendment would exempt sports like football from the Title IX regulations and had support from many University of Texas employees.

== Awards and recognition ==
Lopiano is a six-time National Champion, nine-time All-American, and three-time ASA Softball MVP. In addition, she is a member of thirteen halls of fame, including National Sports Hall of Fame, the National Softball Hall of Fame and the Texas Women's Hall of Fame. She was named one of "The 10 Most Powerful Women in Sports" by Fox Sports and The Sporting News has also listed her as one of "The 100 Most Influential People in Sports."

Mrs. Lopiano is also a well-established commentator on sports, women and their intersection, and has published articles in several peer-reviewed journals and magazines, such as The Journal of Physical Education, Recreation, and Dance, Roger Williams University Law Review, Brandweek, San Francisco Business Times, Clinics in Sports Medicine, Sporting Goods Business, and Physical Educator. In addition, she wrote her own book, Athletic Director’s Desk Reference, which gives tips and planning tools to athletic administrators.
