= Pride of the Susquehanna =

Diesel-powered paddle-wheel riverboat

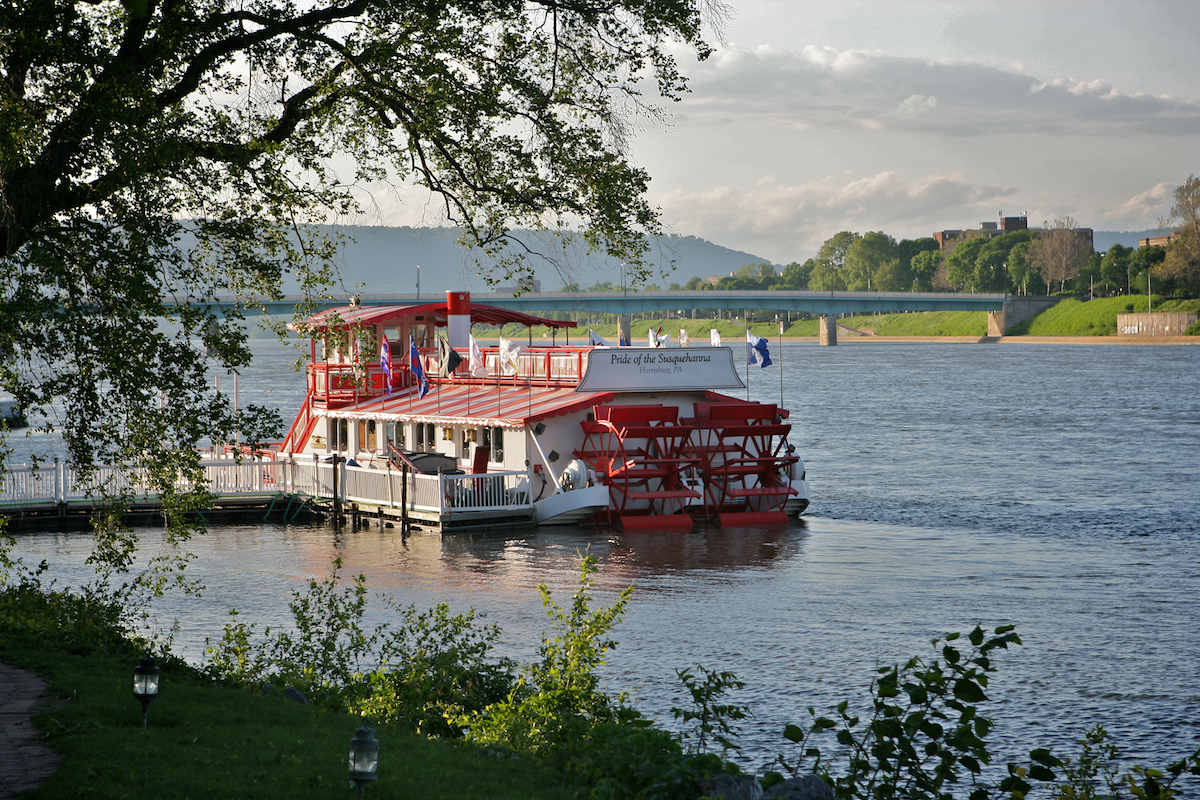

History
- Operator: Harrisburg Area Riverboat Society
- Builder: Flanders Keller
- Launched: 1988
- Maiden voyage: June 11, 1988
- Home port: City Island, Harrisburg, Pennsylvania, U.S.

General characteristics
- Tonnage: 100
- Length: 65 ft (20 m)
- Beam: 24 ft (7.3 m)
- Decks: 2
- Installed power: diesel
- Propulsion: stern paddle-wheel
- Capacity: 160

Pride of the Susquehanna is a diesel-powered paddle-wheel riverboat owned and operated by the Harrisburg Area Riverboat Society non-profit, moored at City Island, Harrisburg, Pennsylvania on the Susquehanna River during its annual operational period.

== History ==
The idea of a riverboat was conceived by Mike Trephan as a way to boost the festivities around Kipona and the Susquehanna River. After the idea to borrow the Millersburg Ferry for Kipona weekend was decided unfeasible, the Harrisburg Area Riverboat Society was formed in 1985 with the blessing of Mayor Stephen R. Reed to build its own for the city. Flanders Keller of Port Trevorton, a former coal dredger and shipbuilder was contracted to construct the ship to the designs of Joseph Phelen. After the first hull was placed into the river, rising water levels caused it to break free and become wedged along the Market Street Bridge, which prompted a hull rebuild with larger dimensions. It was built as a "replica" of late 1800s-era riverboats but with diesel power. Interior doors on the Pride are restored from the RMS Queen Mary, a British ocean liner that sailed the North Atlantic in the 20th century. Propelled and steered by two 11- by 4-foot stern paddle wheels, it is one of only six remaining riverboats left with an authentic paddlewheel in the United States. Before its dedication, the public was asked to come up with a name for the ship, and Barb Burrell submitted the winning name. In 2016, the "Pride" celebrated their one-millionth passenger.

== Operations ==
The Pride of the Susquehanna offers multiple daily 45-minute sightseeing tours, as well as special themed cruises (Murder Mystery Dinner, Sunset Dinner, Wine on Wednesdays, Rock the Boat, and more!). The non-profit also operates the "Susquehanna River School," a 75-minute cruise on Saturday mornings from 9:30 a.m. to 10:45 a.m. This floating classroom on the Pride of the Susquehanna features interactive education about the river, its history and ecology, conservation, and the environment. The educational program is taught by PA certified instructors, Trevar Scheuch and Harold Post. Stored off-season on the south end of City Island, it is launched each year with the help of the Pennsylvania National Guard.

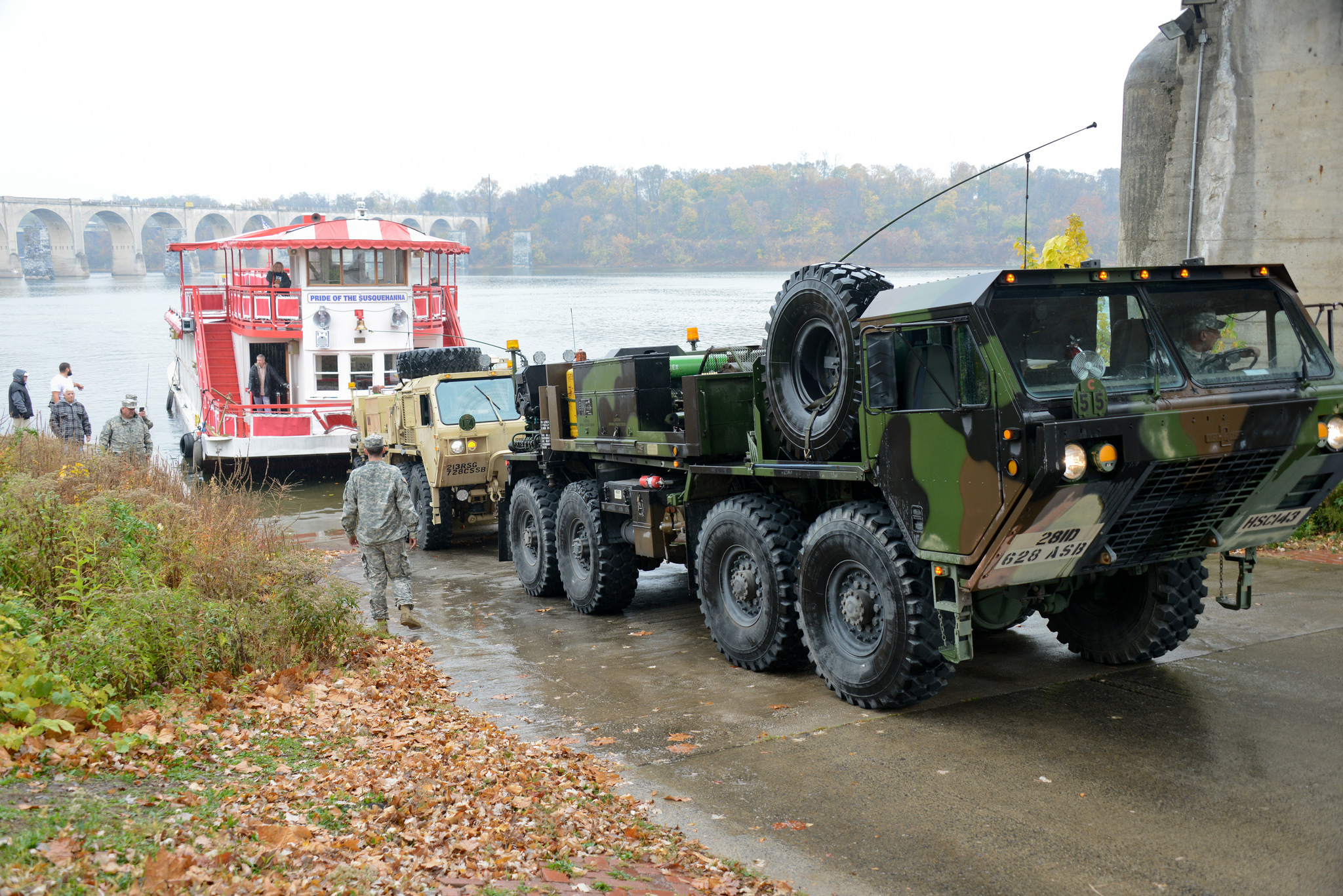
Pennsylvania National Guard members retrieve the Pride of the Susquehanna from the Susquehanna River at City Island, Nov. 10, 2015
