= Harrisburg Senators =

- Founded in 1987; Harrisburg, Pennsylvania
Team logo
Cap insignia

Minor league affiliations
- Class: Double-A (1987–present)
- League: Eastern League (1987–present)
- Division: Southwest Division

Major league affiliations
- Team: Washington Nationals (2005–present)
- Previous teams: Montreal Expos (1991–2004); Pittsburgh Pirates (1987–1990)

Minor league titles
- League titles (6): 1987; 1993; 1996; 1997; 1998; 1999
- Division titles (4): 1994; 1997; 2011; 2013

Team data
- Name: Harrisburg Senators (1987–present)
- Colors: Red, navy blue, gold, white
- Mascot: Rascal (1998–present); Grrrounder (2004–present); Uncle Slam (1987–1998, 2015–present); Thrilla Gorilla (2004); Senator Rudy (1997–1998)
- Ballpark: FNB Field (1987–present)
- Owner/ Operator: Diamond Baseball Holdings
- President: Kevin Kulp
- General manager: Randy Whitaker
- Manager: Delino DeShields
- Website: milb.com/harrisburg

The Harrisburg Senators are a Minor League Baseball team who play in the Eastern League, and are the Double-A affiliate of the Washington Nationals. The team is based in Harrisburg, Pennsylvania, and play their home games at FNB Field on City Island, which opened in 1987 and has a seating capacity of 6,187.

The "Senators" nickname refers to the host city being the state's capital and thus home of the Pennsylvania legislature. The team colors are red, navy blue, gold, and white, the same of the parent club, the Washington Nationals.

Harrisburg has won nine Eastern League titles and is the first team in league history to win four titles in a row (1996–1999). The 1993 Senators were recognized as one of the 100 greatest minor league teams of all time.

== Previous Harrisburg baseball history ==
The city of Harrisburg has a long history of professional baseball. The Harrisburg Base Ball Association existed as long ago as 1884 (according to a stock certificate issued on March 1, 1884). According to another source, in 1901, the first baseball club in Harrisburg was created. In 1912, Harrisburg won the first of three Tri-State Association championships in a row. In 1915, an affiliated International League team moved from Newark, New Jersey, to Harrisburg, Pennsylvania. The club lasted one year before moving to the New York State League and disbanding. This left the city without professional baseball for seven years.

In 1924, an incarnation of the Senators joined the newly formed New York–Penn League which was eventually renamed the Eastern League. Initially, the Senators and most of the other New York–Penn League teams were not affiliated with a Major League Baseball team. In 1927, the Senators started a five-year campaign with three Eastern league championships, winning titles in 1927, 1928, and 1931. The Senators' reign ended in 1936, when flood waters from the surrounding Susquehanna River ruined their home ballpark, Island Field.

Another team representing Harrisburg affiliated with the Pittsburgh Pirates formed four years later, though in the smaller Interstate League. Like the Senators before it, the team gained success quickly, winning the league title one year later. The success, however, was short-lived, as the team moved to nearby York in 1943. Another team affiliated with the Cleveland Indians was created, but was not as successful. The Interstate League disbanded this Harrisburg team in 1952, and any form of professional baseball was not played in the city for the next 35 years.

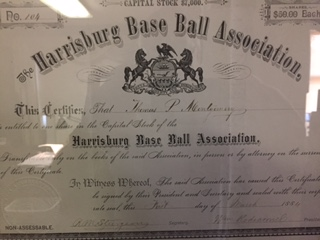
A stock certificate of the Harrisburg Base Ball Association from 1884

== Modern franchise history ==
=== New England roots ===
The modern Harrisburg Senators originated in the New England states. First established in 1976 as an affiliate of the Milwaukee Brewers, the Berkshire Brewers played one season in Pittsfield, Massachusetts. After that season, they moved to Holyoke, Massachusetts, where they took the nickname the Millers.

In 1981, the franchise changed affiliations, moving from the Brewers to the California Angels. After the 1982 season, the team relocated to Nashua, New Hampshire, as the Nashua Angels. After the 1983 season, the team's affiliation changed again, this time to the Pittsburgh Pirates. The team changed its name then to the Nashua Pirates.

At the same time, during the mid-1980s, Harrisburg Mayor Stephen Reed initiated a revitalization plan that included a ballpark for a new Minor League Baseball team in the city. The Nashua Pirates relocated to Harrisburg and was rechristened the Senators on December 9, 1986.

=== The Senators ===
Like the original Senators, success was quick, winning the Eastern League championship in its first season. In 1991, affiliation shifted from the Pittsburgh Pirates to the Montreal Expos, an affiliation continuing through that team's move to Washington, D.C., where they continued as the Washington Nationals. The first several years of affiliation with Montreal brought consecutive championships from 1996 to 1998. In 1999, the Senators played the Norwich Navigators for a shot at their record-setting fourth consecutive Eastern League championship. In the bottom of the ninth inning of game 5, the Senators trailed by 3 runs, but with 2 outs, the bases loaded, and a full count Milton Bradley hit a walk-off grand slam to right center field to win the fourth-straight championship for the Senators, an Eastern League first. In 2003, Sueng Song pitched the first no-hitter in modern Senators history.

In conjunction with Major League Baseball's restructuring of Minor League Baseball in 2021, the Senators were organized into the Double-A Northeast. In 2022, the Double-A Northeast became known as the Eastern League, the name historically used by the regional circuit prior to the 2021 reorganization.

== Uniforms and logo ==
The official colors of the Harrisburg Senators are red, navy blue, metallic gold, and white. The home and away uniforms resemble those of the Washington Nationals, with a red cap for home games and navy blue for away. Both caps include the "H" and streaking baseball logo, with the "H" in the same script as the Nationals' pretzel-shaped "W." The white home jerseys include red and navy blue trim around the collar and sleeves with the "Senators" wordmark in red with metallic gold bevels and navy blue outline. The grey away jersey has navy blue and red trim around the collar and sleeves, with the "Harrisburg" word mark in navy blue with metallic gold bevels and red outline. Both word marks are identical to the Nationals brand.

In 2007, the Senators added a unique logo to their brand, incorporating the prevalent and much reviled mayfly into the "H." Because of FNB Field's location on City Island in the Susquehanna River, thousands of mayflies are attracted to the ballpark's bright lights, obscuring their view.

== Ownership ==
The city of Harrisburg paid $6.7 million in 1995 to acquire the team from the previous owners of the franchise, who were planning to move the team to a new taxpayer-financed ballpark in Springfield, Massachusetts. Instead of appeasing the desires of the ownership group with a new stadium, Harrisburg Mayor Stephen Reed led the city of Harrisburg to purchase the team instead. The previous owners had bought the team only six months earlier for just $4.1 million.

Citing the ballpark as the major link in his downtown revitalization project, when asked how he could afford the hefty price tag, Mayor Reed responded by asking, "How could we not?" For a time, the Senators remained one of the only sports franchises in the United States to be completely owned by the community in which it was based. In 2006, the city put the team up for sale to combat a major budget deficit. Mayor Reed stipulated that the new owner must keep the team in Harrisburg for at least 29 years.

The team was eventually bought by Senators Partners, LLC of Northbrook, Illinois, headed by Jerry Reinsdorf's son Michael, for an Eastern League record $13.25 million. Mark Butler, CEO of Ollie's Bargain Outlet, became the team's majority owner in March 2015, replacing Michael Reinsdorf who was principal owner and managing partner; the purchase price was not disclosed.

In April 2024, it was announced that the team had been sold to Diamond Baseball Holdings (DBH), a sports management group owned by Silver Lake, an American private equity firm.

== Triple-A franchise bid ==
In mid-2005, Peter Angelos, the owner of the Baltimore Orioles, gained the permission of the Double-A Eastern League and the Triple-A International League to move Baltimore's Triple-A affiliate from Ottawa, Ontario, Canada, to Harrisburg. One of the hangups with the agreement was that a buyer for the Double-A Senators franchise had to be found. The Ottawa franchise moved to Allentown, Pennsylvania, as the Triple-A team for the Philadelphia Phillies, renamed as the Lehigh Valley IronPigs. The Baltimore Orioles also signed a player development deal with the Norfolk Tides of the International League. The Tides became be the Triple-A affiliate of the Orioles.

== Stadium renovation ==
FNB Field received a $32 million renovation ($19.1 million in state funding) in two stages. Originally the renovation was to begin in 2005; however, delays in state funding for the project were postponed until 2008, meaning the improvements were not implemented for Senators fans until the 2009 season, and the second stage was completed before the 2010 season.

== Life Size Bobblehead Hall of Fame ==
In 2016, the Harrisburg Senators started a tradition by recognizing great players from their history in a unique way, The One & Only World-Famous, Life Size Bobblehead Hall of Fame. These enshrined Senators' legends will each receive their own life-size bobblehead. The life-size bobbleheads will be on permanent display at FNB Field with each bobblehead holding a commemorative plaque. The Senators plan to enshrine players yearly.

Season Inducted	Player	No.	Date Inducted	Major League Affiliation	Season(s) with Senators
2016	Vladimir Guerrero	27	April 16, 2016	Montreal Expos	1996
2016	Cliff Floyd	30	July 9, 2016	Montreal Expos	1993
2016	Bryce Harper	34	August 13, 2016	Washington Nationals	2011
2017	Matt Stairs	25	May 6, 2017	Montreal Expos	1991
2017	Brandon Phillips	7	August 5, 2017	Montreal Expos	2001–2002
2018	Stephen Strasburg	37	May 26, 2018	Washington Nationals	2010
2019	Jamey Carroll	13	August 3, 2019	Montreal Expos	1998–2002
2021	Ryan Zimmerman	16	August 7, 2021 (June 27, 2020)	Washington Nationals	2005
2022	Gregg Mace	27	July 23, 2022	–	1987–2019
2023	Michael Barrett	8	July 29, 2023	Montreal Expos	1998
2024	Aaron Barrett	32	July 20, 2024	Washington Nationals	2013, 2019, 2021

== Broadcast ==
Every Harrisburg Senators ballgame is aired on 1460 the Ticket (AM 1460 WTKT – Clear Channel). Terry Byrom has been the voice of the Senators since 2005. The games are also streamed on the team's website. Some games are also aired on the local TV station, Comcast Network, and occasionally has games aired on MASN. The first radio play-by-play broadcaster for the Senators was Dan Kamal, who did the broadcasts from 1987 until the mid-1990s. Kamal at the time was also the radio voice of the Hershey Bears of the American Hockey League. He later was a TV analyst and studio host for the Atlanta Thrashers and then the Columbus Blue Jackets of the National Hockey League.

== Roster ==
Harrisburg Senators roster
Players	Coaches/Other
Pitchers: 4 Alex Clemmey; 37 Robert Cranz; 9 Noah Dean; 12 Davian Garcia; 14 Sandy Gaston; 28 Marquis Grissom Jr.; 34 Chance Huff; 48 Valentin Linarez; 44 Kyle Luckham; 29 Erick Mejia; 20 Shinnosuke Ogasawara; 22 Thomas Schultz; 24 Jared Simpson; 32 Billy Sullivan; 35 Eriq Swan; -- Dylan Tebrake; 31 Connor Van Scoyoc; Catchers: 5 Kyle Hayes; 15 Caleb Lomavita; 21 Maxwell Romero Jr.; Infielders: 7 Marcus Brown; 25 Sam Brown; 6 Cortland Lawson; 16 Kervin Pichardo; 10 Cayden Wallace; Outfielders: 13 Elijah Nunez; 11 Sam Petersen; 18 Leandro Pineda; 17 Jack Rogers; 1 Johnathon Thomas	Manager: 26 Delino DeShields; Coaches: 46 Rigo Beltrán (pitching); 41 Darin Everson (hitting); 36 JT Heenan (coach); 39 Pete Horner (assistant pitching); 2 Nik McClaughry (defensive); 60-day injured list: 8 Branden Boissiere; 2 Kevin Made; -- Alejandro Rosario (full season); -- Tyler Stuart; -- Jarlin Susana; -- Travis Sykora; 7-day injured list; * On Washington Nationals 40-man roster; ~ Development list; # Rehab assignment; ∞ Reserve list; ‡ Restricted list; § Suspended list; † Temporarily inactive list; Roster updated May 22, 2026; Transactions; → More rosters: MiLB • Eastern League; → Washington Nationals minor league players

== Team records ==
=== Season records ===
This is a partial list of the last five seasons completed by the Senators. For the full season-by-season history, see List of Harrisburg Senators seasons

Year (affiliation)	Wins	Losses	Winning pct.	GB (Division standing)	Manager
2019 (Washington Nationals)	76	63	.547	−1.5 (2nd out of 6 in Western Division, 1st Half Division Winner)	Matthew LeCroy
2020 (Washington Nationals)	Season canceled due to the COVID-19 pandemic				
2021 (Washington Nationals)	42	76	.356	−30.5 (6th out of 6 in Southwestern Division)	Tripp Keister
2022 (Washington Nationals)	52	85	.380	−27.5 (6th out of 6 in Southwestern Division)	Tripp Keister
2023 (Washington Nationals)	59	77	.434	−15.5 (6th out of 6 in Southwestern Division)	Delino DeShields
2024 (Washington Nationals)	68	70	.493	−12.0 (3rd out of 6 in Southwestern Division)	Delino DeShields
CURRENT SENATORS TOTAL	2584	2590	.499	—	—

– in GB is behind, + in GB is ahead

=== Individual season records ===
Batting records
Games	141	Jamie Carroll	1999
At Bats	565	Brandon Watson	2003
Runs	134	Lawrence Fischer	1932
Hits	198	Horace McBride	1930
Total Bases	355	Joe Munson	1925
Doubles	40	Horace McBride	1930
Triples	21	Horace McBride	1930
Home Runs	37	Andy Tracy	1999
RBI	129	Joe Munson	1925
Walks	93	Val Pascucci	2002
Strikeouts	139	Andy Tracy	1999
Sacrifices	30	Glenn Killinger	1928
Sacrifice Flies	11	Lance Belen	1988
Stolen Bases	52	Jim Reboulet	1987
Batting Average	.400	Joe Munson	1925

Pitching records
Games	60	Alberto Reyes	1994
Complete Games	22	Louis Polli	1927
Shutouts	5	Louis Polli	1927
Wins	23	Clint Brown	1928
Losses	18	Clint Parkes	1929
Saves	35	Alberto Reyes	1994
Innings	292	Charles Parkes	1929
Walks	130	Bill Dietrich	1931
Strikeouts	161	Ronald Chiavacci	2001
ERA	2.15	Clint Brown	1928
