= Kipona =

Annual river festival in Pennsylvania

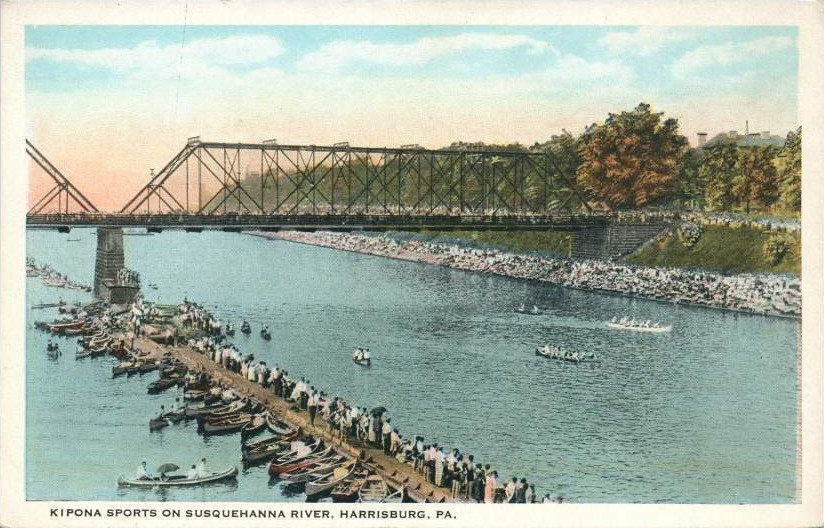
- Canoe Race under Walnut Street Bridge, Kipona 1920
- Status: Active
- Genre: Festival
- Date: Labor Day Weekend
- Frequency: Annually
- Venue: Riverfront Park and City Island
- Location: Harrisburg, Pennsylvania
- Years active: 1916,1919-1922,1936-40, 1946-2019, 2021-present
- Inaugurated: September 4, 1916
- Founder: Edward J. Stackpole Sr.
- Attendance: 70,000
- Area: Susquehanna Valley
- Organizer: City of Harrisburg
- Website: Official website

Kipona is an annual festival held each Labor Day weekend in Harrisburg, Pennsylvania celebrating the Susquehanna River. Its name means "on sparkling water" to some Native Americans, of which "sparkling water" was thought to be what the river was traditionally called by the Susquehannock and Shawanese tribes.

== History ==
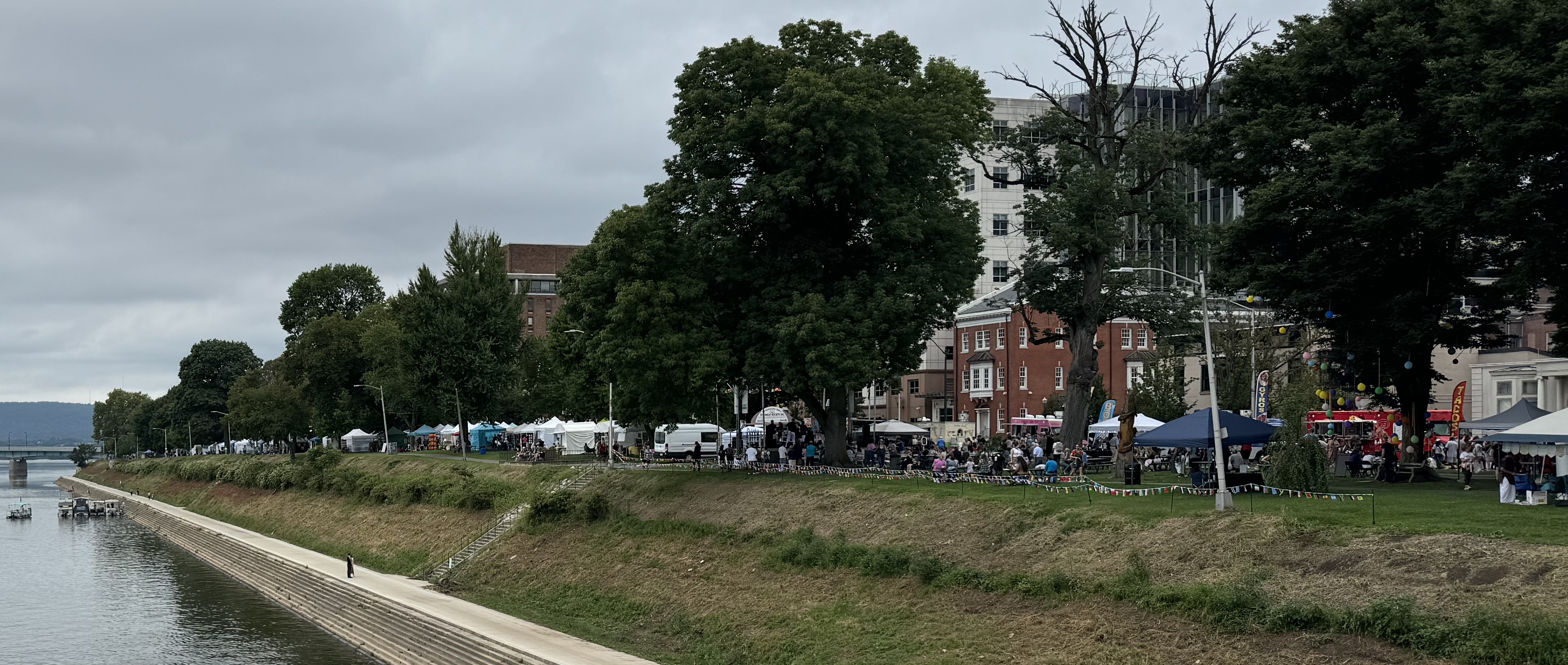
The 2024 festival

In the early 20th century, the municipal improvements of the City Beautiful movement included construction of the riverfront steps and esplanade on Riverfront Park as well as the Dock Street Dam to allow better river recreation. Vance McCormick as mayor advocated river festivals, and the city held boat parades and galas from 1907 to 1915; a large aquatic carnival in 1915 celebrated the city's achievements. Business rival Edward J. Stackpole Sr. of the Harrisburg Telegraph stole the idea the following summer, enlisting councilman M. Harvey Taylor and prominent banker George W. Reily to help implement an annual aquatic festival to generate revenue for the city and increase civic pride toward the city and the Susquehanna River. The name was chosen from a city-wide competition, where "Kipona" was proposed by Dr. Hugh Hamilton of the Pennsylvania Federation of Historical Societies, who later composed a song entitled "Ki-po-nah". The Greater Harrisburg Navy organized it, and an estimated 50,000 attended. As the United States entered World War I, the festival was cancelled for the 1917 and 1918, but revived the following year. Financial problems with the city halted the festival from 1923; following the Flood of 1936, Kipona was revived as a morale booster.

There were cancellations since its revival in 1941-45, and 2020.

During the 2025 festival, a motorist drove a minivan through the crowd, resulting in multiple injuries.

== Attractions ==
Annual festivities include a celebration/festival of India, a Native American Pow-Wow, art and craft exhibits, live music, carnival rides, games, vendors, food trucks, canoe races and fireworks display. Former attractions have included tightrope walking, Ferris wheels, contests for decorated boats, high diving, canoe tilting contests, sailing, swimming races, hydroplane racing, hang gliding stunts, escape artists, waterskiing, inner tubing, chili cookoff, Competitive eating, car show, bicycle races, hot air balloons, and Rubber duck races.
