= Harrisburg Independence Day Celebration =

Annual festival in Harrisburg, Pennsylvania, US

Coordinates: 40.26800°N 76.89331°W

Harrisburg's Independence Day Celebration
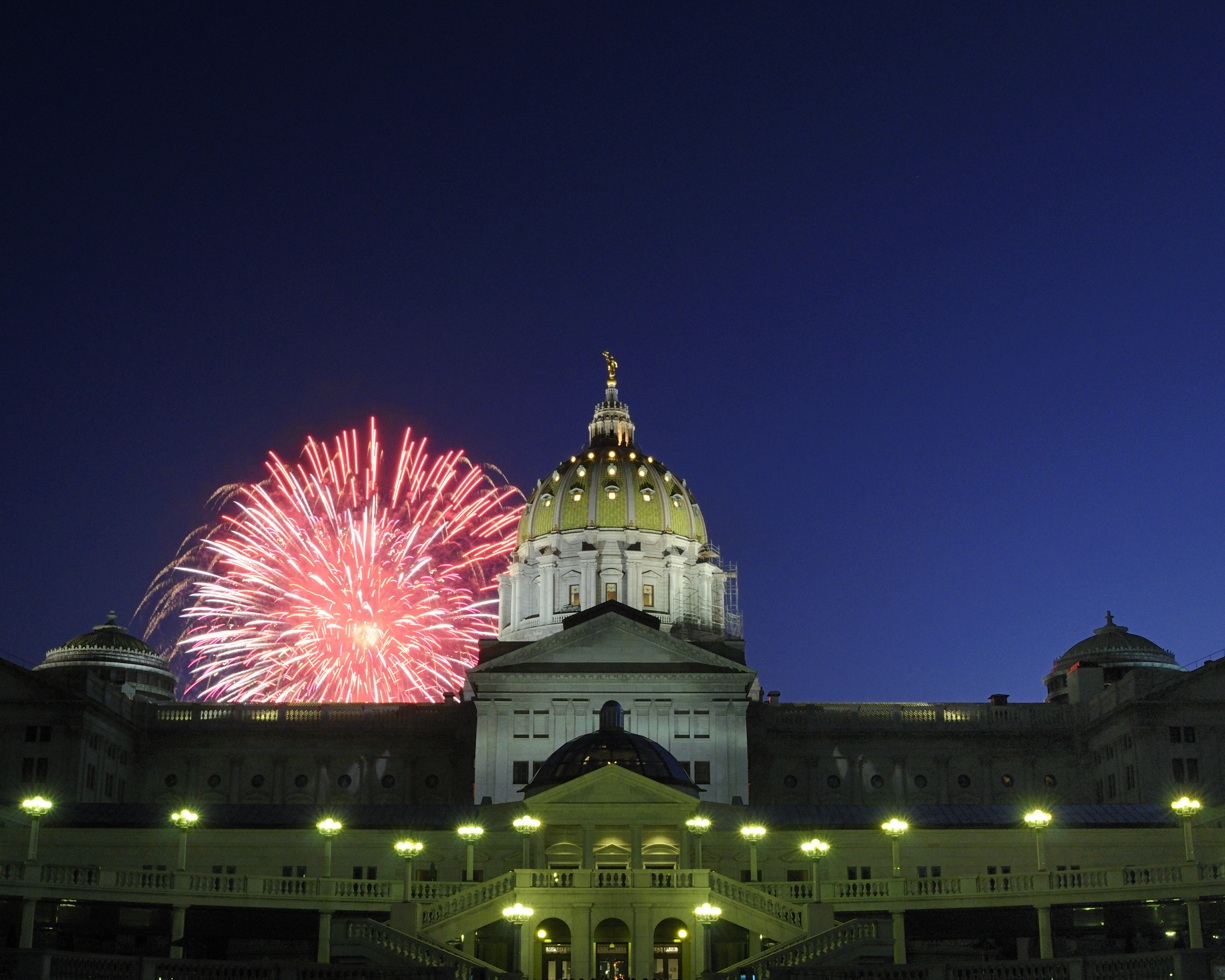
- Fireworks display seen behind the Pennsylvania State Capitol
- Genre: Holiday
- Frequency: Annual
- Venue: Riverfront Park and City Island
- Location: Harrisburg, Pennsylvania
- Website: Official website

Harrisburg's Independence Day Celebration is an annual music and food festival that takes place in Harrisburg, Pennsylvania on Fourth of July weekend. It is the state's largest Independence Day weekend music festival.

Festivities take place along Riverfront Park and City Island and consist of street concerts, food and craft vendors, a wine/beer garden, amusement rides and a large fireworks display.

== History ==
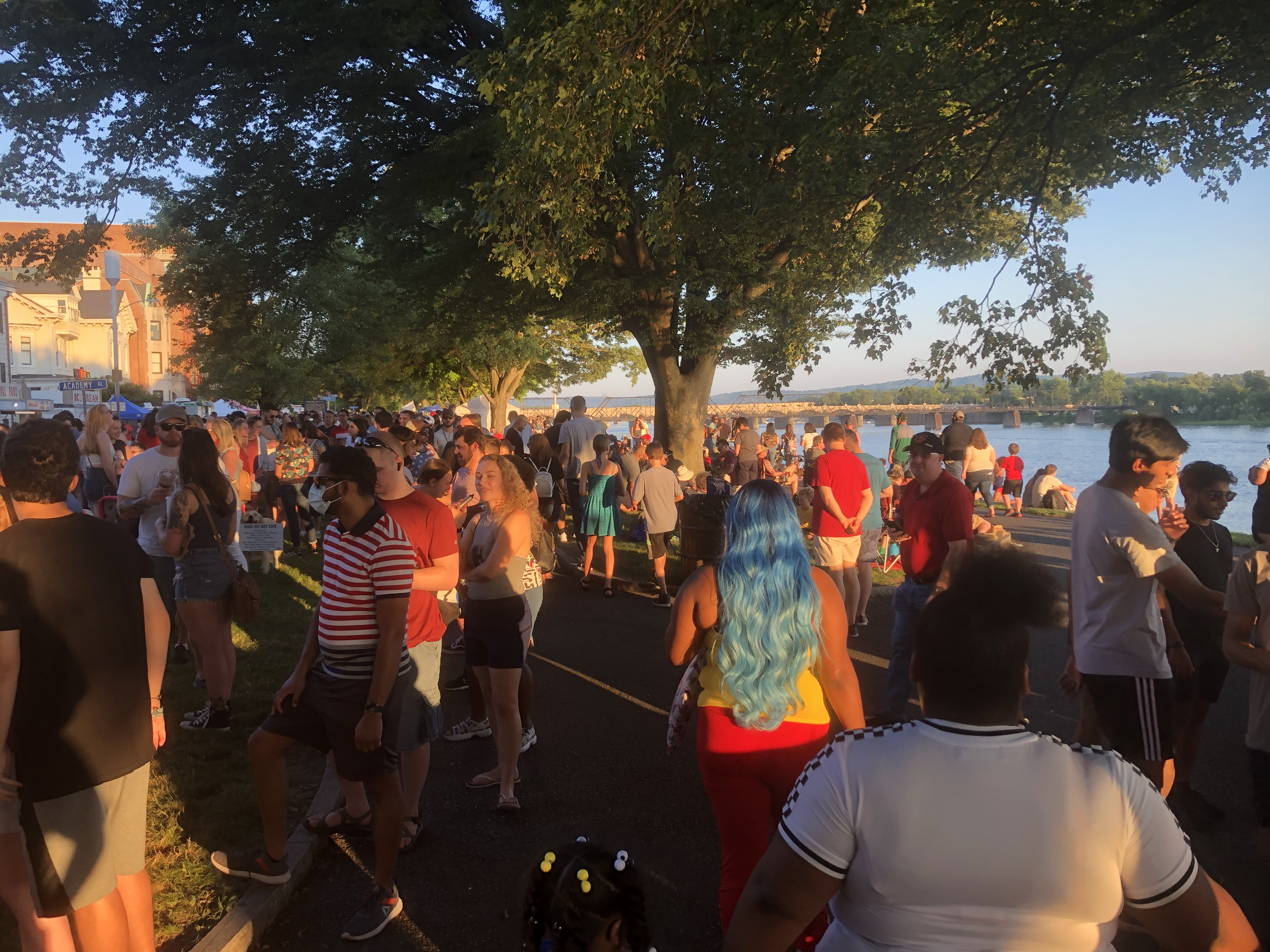
Visitors on Riverfront Park for "July 4th Food Trucks & Fireworks" in 2021

The festival's name has changed across the years, from "The Harrisburg Independence Weekend Festival" to "American MusicFest" in 1999, to "Harrisburg Jazz & Multi-Cultural Festival" by Mayor Linda D. Thompson in 2010, then "Harrisburg's Fourth of July Celebration" in 2013 under Mayor Eric Papenfuse, "Harrisburg Independence Weekend Walkaround" for 2014, and finally Harrisburg's "Taste of Independence" from 2015, where it became a food truck festival.

The 2020 celebration was cancelled due to the COVID-19 pandemic, but the fireworks show was still presented. The event returned in 2021 for one day as "July 4th Food Trucks & Fireworks."
