= Holocaust Memorial for the Commonwealth of Pennsylvania =

Coordinates: 40.26864°N 76.89291°W

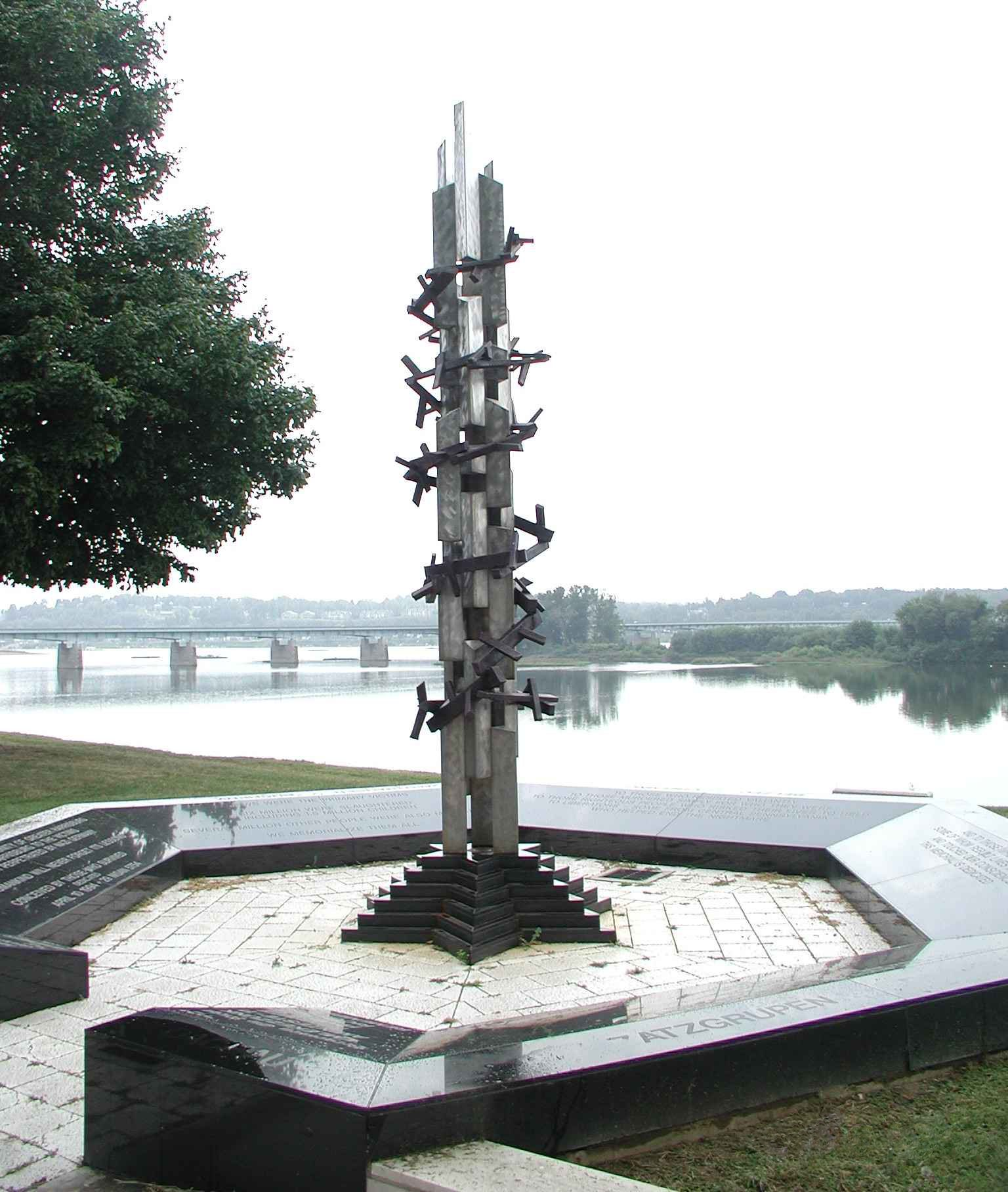
Holocaust Memorial along the Susquehanna River in Harrisburg, Pennsylvania.

The Holocaust Memorial for the Commonwealth of Pennsylvania is a Holocaust memorial at Front and Sayford Streets along Riverfront Park, in Harrisburg, Pennsylvania. It was conceived by a committee of Holocaust survivors in 1992 representing the Jewish Community Center of Harrisburg. In light of publicity given to the U.S. Holocaust Museum, a group of survivors that had lived in the Harrisburg area pressed for a local memorial. It was designed by David Ascalon for $200,000 on a site designated by the City of Harrisburg along the public park land adjacent to the Susquehanna River. The Memorial was dedicated in 1994. An annual Yom Hashoah observance is held at the site.
