= Pride Festival of Central PA =

Annual LGBT event in Harrisburg, Pennsylvania

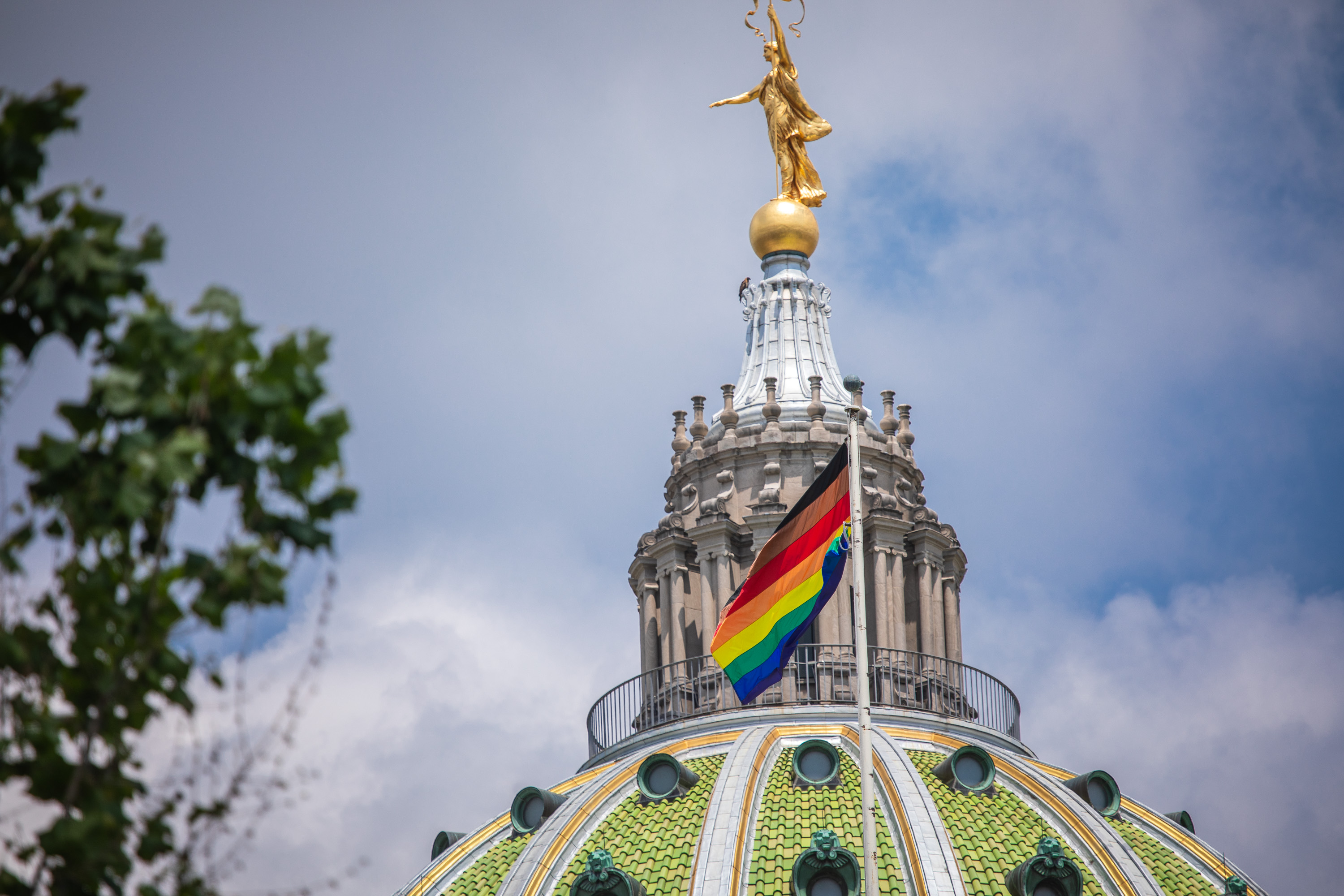
- Flying the Pride Flag over the Capitol
- Genre: LGBT, gay pride
- Dates: Last Saturday in July
- Locations: Harrisburg, Pennsylvania, United States
- Years active: 33–34
- Founded: 1992
- Attendance: 5000
- Website: harrisburgpride.com; centralpapride.org

Pride Festival of Central PA, alternatively called PrideFest of Central PA, is a non-profit which hosts a three-day annual gay pride event that takes place in Harrisburg, Pennsylvania.

== History ==
The first pride event in Central Pennsylvania took place in Linglestown, Pennsylvania in the late 1980s. From there it was moved to Ski Roundtop and Harrisburg Area Community College before eventually finding a long term home in Riverfront Park in 1992, when it was also formed as a non-profit.

The festival now features musical acts, drag queens, and attracts thousands of attendees. In 2018, it became the first Pride to ever take place on a US State Capitol when it was held at Soldier's Grove, Pennsylvania State Capitol. In 2020 and 2021, the Festival was cancelled due to concerns regarding the COVID-19 pandemic.

The Central PA Pride Festival returned in July 2022 with three days of events including: Voice United, a pre-Pride concert presented by The Central PA Womyn's Chorus, the Harrisburg Gay Men's Chorus, and MCC of the Spirit Choir on Friday night before Festival.

Pride Festival is typically held in Harrisburg on the last Saturday in July. Entertainment includes bands, drag shows, Family Zone, vendors, and food. Spirits United offers Sunday church services celebrating the LGBTQ+ community.
