= List of Harrisburg Senators seasons =

This is a list of seasons completed by the Harrisburg Senators of the Eastern League. This list documents the records and playoff results for all seasons the Senators have completed since their first inception in 1924 through 1935, and their second inception since 1987.

== Original Senators (1924–1935) ==
Year (affiliation)	Wins	Losses	Winning Pct.	GB (Division Standing)	Manager
1924 (Independent)	70	60	.539	-15.5 (4th out of 8)	Steve Yerkes/Mickey LaLonge/Glen Killinger
1925 (Independent)	61	69	.469	-15 (6th out of 8)	Rankin Johnson, Sr.
1926 (Independent)	47	84	.359	-35.5 (8th out of 8)	Rankin Johnson/Joe Lightner
1927 (Independent)	87	51	.630	+6 (1st out of 8)	Win Clark
1928 (Independent)	82	54	.603	+1 (1st out of 8)	Glen Killinger
1929 (Independent)	75	62	.547	-7 (3rd out of 8)	Johnny Tillman
1930 (Independent)	70	69	.504	-9.5 (4th out of 8)	Johnny Tillman
1931 (Independent)	83	56	.597	+3 (1st out of 8)	Joe Cobb/Eddie Onslow
1932 (Boston Braves)	74	66	.529	-4.5 (2nd out of 8)	Eddie Onslow
1933 (Boston Braves)	60	76	.441	-20 (7th out of 8)	Eddie Onslow
1934 (Boston Braves)	60	75	.444	-16.5 (8th out of 8)	Leslie Mann
1935 (Boston Braves)	59	77	.434	-22.5 (6th out of 8)	Art Shires
ORIGINAL SENATORS TOTAL	828	799	.509		

== Modern-day Senators (1987–present) ==
Year (affiliation)	Wins	Losses	Winning Pct.	GB (Division Standing)	Manager
1987 (Pittsburgh Pirates)	77	63	.550	-11 (2nd out of 8)	Dave Trembley
1988 (Pittsburgh Pirates)	65	73	.471	-15.5 (7th out of 8)	Dave Trembley
1989 (Pittsburgh Pirates)	71	65	.522	-19 (2nd out of 8)	Dave Trembley
1990 (Pittsburgh Pirates)	69	69	.500	-9.5 (5th out of 8)	Marc Bombard
1991 (Montreal Expos)	87	53	.621	+6 (1st out of 8)	Mike Quade
1992 (Montreal Expos)	78	59	.569	-1.5 (3rd out of 8)	Mike Quade
1993 (Montreal Expos)	94	44	.681	+19 (1st out of 8)	Jim Tracy
1994 (Montreal Expos)	88	51	.633	+5.5 (1st out of 5 in Southern Division)	Dave Jauss
1995 (Montreal Expos)	61	80	.433	-11.5 (5th out of 5 in Southern Division)	Pat Kelly
1996 (Montreal Expos)	74	68	.521	-12 (2nd out of 5 in Southern Division)	Pat Kelly
1997 (Montreal Expos)	86	56	.606	+11 (1st out of 5 in Southern Division)	Rick Sofield
1998 (Montreal Expos)	73	69	.514	-8.5 (2nd out of 5 in Southern Division)	Rick Sweet
1999 (Montreal Expos)	76	66	.535	-9.5 (2nd out of 6 in Southern Division)	Doug Sisson
2000 (Montreal Expos)	76	67	.531	-9.5 (2nd out of 6 in Southern Division)	Doug Sisson
2001 (Montreal Expos)	66	76	.465	-18 (4th out of 6 in Southern Division)	Luis Dorante
2002 (Montreal Expos)	79	63	.556	-14.5 (2nd out of 6 in Southern Division)	Dave Huppert
2003 (Montreal Expos)	60	82	.423	-28.5 (6th out of 6 in Southern Division)	Dave Machemer
2004 (Montreal Expos)	52	90	.366	-33.5 (6th out of 6 in Southern Division)	Dave Machemer
2005 (Washington Nationals)	64	78	.451	-20 (5th out of 6 in Southern Division)	Keith Bodie
2006 (Washington Nationals)	67	75	.472	-20 (5th out of 6 in Southern Division)	John Stearns
2007 (Washington Nationals)	55	86	.390	-26.5 (6th out of 6 in Southern Division)	Scott Little
2008 (Washington Nationals)	73	69	.514	-11 (3rd out of 6 in Southern Division)	John Stearns
2009 (Washington Nationals)	70	72	.493	-19 (5th out of 6 in Southern Division)	John Stearns
2010 (Washington Nationals)	77	65	.542	-5 (2nd out of 6 in Western Division)	Randy Knorr
2011 (Washington Nationals)	80	62	.563	+4 (1st out of 6 in Western Division)	Tony Beasley
2012 (Washington Nationals)	64	78	.451	-18.5 (5th out of 6 in Western Division)	Matthew LeCroy
2013 (Washington Nationals)	77	65	.542	+1 (1st out of 6 in Western Division)	Matthew LeCroy
2014 (Washington Nationals)	53	89	.373	-26 (6th out of 6 in Western Division)	Brian Daubach
2015 (Washington Nationals)	67	75	.472	-12 (5th out of 6 in Western Division)	Brian Daubach
2016 (Washington Nationals)	76	66	.535	-1.5 (3rd out of 6 in Western Division)	Matthew LeCroy
2017 (Washington Nationals)	60	80	.429	-14 (6th out of 6 in Western Division)	Matthew LeCroy
2018 (Washington Nationals)	72	65	.526	-5.5 (3rd out of 6 in Western Division)	Matthew LeCroy
2019 (Washington Nationals)	76	63	.547	-1.5 (2nd out of 6 in Western Division, 1st Half Division Winner)	Matthew LeCroy
2021 (Washington Nationals)	42	76	.356	−30.5 (6th out of 6 in Southwestern Division)	Tripp Keister
2022 (Washington Nationals)	52	85	.380	−27.5 (6th out of 6 in Southwestern Division)	Tripp Keister
2023 (Washington Nationals)	59	77	.434	−15.5 (6th out of 6 in Southwestern Division)	Delino DeShields
2024 (Washington Nationals)	68	70	.493	−12.0 (3rd out of 6 in Southwestern Division)	Delino DeShields
2025 (Washington Nationals)	68	70	.493	−16.0 (4th out of 6 in Southwestern Division)	Delino DeShields
2026 (Washington Nationals)	67	67	.500	−10.5 (3rd out of 6 in Southwestern Division)	Delino DeShields
CURRENT SENATORS TOTAL	2719	2727	.499		
ALL TIME TOTAL	3479	3456	.502		

- in GB is behind, + in GB is ahead Bold years are Eastern League Championship years

Playoff Results
Year	Round	Opponent	Result
1987	Semi-Finals	vs. Reading	3-2
	Finals	vs. Vermont	3-1
1989	Semi-Finals	vs. Canton-Akron	3-2
	Finals	vs. Albany	1-3
1991	Semi-Finals	vs. Canton-Akron	3-1
	Finals	vs. Albany	1-3
1992	Semi-Finals	vs. Canton-Akron	1-3
1993	Semi-Finals	vs. Albany-Colonie	3-1
	Finals	vs. Canton-Akron	3-2
1994	Semi-Finals	vs. Bowie	3-2
	Finals	vs. Binghamton	1-3
1996	Semi-Finals	vs. Trenton	3-1
	Finals	vs. Portland	3-1
1997	Semi-Finals	vs. Bowie	3-2
	Finals	vs. Portland	3-1
1998	Semi-Finals	vs. Akron	3-1
	Finals	vs. New Britain	3-1
1999	Semi-Finals	vs. Erie	3-1
	Finals	vs. Norwich	3-2
2000	Semi-Finals	vs. Reading	0-3
2002	Semi-Finals	vs. Akron	3-2
	Finals	vs. Norwich	2-3
2010	Semi-Finals	vs. Altoona	1-3
2011	Semi-Finals	vs. Richmond	0-3
2013	Semi-Finals	vs. Erie	3-1
	Finals	vs. Trenton	0-3
2019	Semi-Finals	vs. Bowie	1-3
PLAYOFF RECORD		.522 Win Pct.	59-54
