= Pennsylvania Spatial Data Access =

Pennsylvania Spatial Data Access (PASDA) is Pennsylvania's official public access geospatial information clearinghouse. PASDA serves as Pennsylvania's node on the National Spatial Data Infrastructure (NSDI). PASDA is a cooperative effort of the Pennsylvania Geospatial Technologies Office of the Office of Information Technology and the Pennsylvania State University Institute of Energy and the Environment.

== Early history ==
Pennsylvania Spatial Data Access (PASDA), the official public geospatial data clearinghouse for the Commonwealth of Pennsylvania marked its 18th year in 2014. PASDA, which has grown from a small website offering 35 data sets in 1996 to the expansive user-centered data clearinghouse that it is today, has become a staple of the GIS community in Pennsylvania. PASDA provides access to thousands of data files, terabytes of data, and hundreds of Internet Map Services, Google Earth KML files, metadata, mapping applications, and other information like guides and tutorials.

PASDA was developed by the Pennsylvania State University as a service to the citizens, governments, and businesses of the Commonwealth. PASDA is a cooperative project of the Governor's Office of Administration, Office for Information Technology, Geospatial Technologies Office and Penn State Institutes for Energy and the Environment of the Pennsylvania State University. Funding is provided by the Pennsylvania Office for Information Technology, Geospatial Technologies Office. The Pennsylvania State University provides additional substantial support to PASDA for system administration, database technologies administration, and infrastructure. The High Performance Computing Center at Penn State is also providing significant resources and support for PASDA. PASDA is housed at Penn State Institute of Energy and the Environment. The purpose of Pennsylvania Spatial Data Access (PASDA) is to serve as a comprehensive geospatial data digital library by providing free, universal access to geospatial data and information by, for, and about the Commonwealth of Pennsylvania. PASDA has served for almost 20 years as the Commonwealth's node on the National Spatial Data Infrastructure (NSDI), Geospatial One Stop, and the National Biological Information Infrastructure.

== Data & Metadata creation ==
The data made available through PASDA is provided by our data partners to encourage the widespread sharing of geospatial data, eliminate the creation of redundant data sets, and to further build an inventory (through the development and hosting of metadata) of available data relevant to the Commonwealth. PASDA serves as a resource for locating data throughout the Commonwealth through its data storage, interactive mapping/webgis applications, and metadata/documentation efforts. PASDA services are provided free of charge to all users and data providers. The data on PASDA is provided by federal, state, local and regional government agencies, non-profit organizations, and academic institutions throughout the region.

Data updates to existing datasets come to PASDA at different intervals and are based on the update frequency of our data partners. Monthly, quarterly, and annual updates are the norm and include PennDOT, PA Department of Environmental Protection, PA Fish and Boat Commission, PA Department of Health, PA Department of Conservation and Natural Resources, Chester County, Allegheny County, Lancaster County, City of Philadelphia, Southeast PA Transportation Authority, Delaware Valley Regional Planning Commission, PA DCNR Rivers Conservation Program, and the Natural Lands Trust.

The development of metadata on PASDA is one of the most important functions. The background of PASDA's metadata development has its origins in the development of the ANSI Z39.50 standard (also known as the ISO 23950 Search and Retrieval Protocol.) This protocol was originally designed for libraries to search and retrieve records from remote library catalogs. PASDA's goal is not only to meet the existing metadata standards but also to create metadata in a format that supports easy search and retrieval of data. In the early stages of PASDA's development the metadata was either in HTML or text format and was subsequently parsed with a metadata parser. PASDA was one of the first clearinghouses to implement the use of extensible markup language.

== Services & Applications ==
PASDA provides direct access to download data via FTP. Currently, PASDA has approximately 60 terabytes of data for download including vector data, imagery, elevation and lidar. In addition to direct download, PASDA has developed multiple ways to access data. In 2000, PASDA was one of the first clearinghouses to address issues related to what is known as "clip, ship, and reproject"—a process by which large data sets can be clipped to a user specified geography, reprojected, and zipped for quick download. Subsequent advances, in particular the development of Internet Map Services, have, in part, eliminated the need for these specialized services.

One of the most important developments in GIS in the past decade has been the ability to create Internet Map Services—also known simply as map services. Map services allow users to consume or pull in data to their GIS software without actually having to download it thereby saving download time and storage space. Map services have been some of the most heavily used features on PASDA and support multiple types of web based GIS applications.

In addition to downloading data and creating map services, many GIS clearinghouses also have created web based GIS applications. The applications available through PASDA include the Pennsylvania Atlas—a data visualization and download app, the Pennsylvania Imagery Navigator—a data visualization, search and retrieval app for imagery and LIDAR, and the Pennsylvania Mine Map Atlas.

The Pennsylvania Mine Map Atlas is a joint project of PASDA and the Pennsylvania Department of Environmental Protection. This Mine Map Atlas provides access to thousands of scanned, georeferenced underground mine maps in the Commonwealth of Pennsylvania. It allows users to view their homes and see if any mines are beneath those homes. The purpose of this effort is to identify houses and other structures at risk of mine subsidence, ground movement caused by the collapse of old, abandoned mines. The final number of mine maps that will be provided through this application is expected to near 100,000 individual maps.

== Related Initiatives & Users ==
PASDA has participated in numerous national and international level initiatives since its beginnings in 1996.

PASDA was an original member of the ESRI Geography Network and ESRI's ArcGIS.com. In addition, PASDA metadata is harvested by multiple data portals including Geospatial One Stop, Data.gov, and the National Biological Information Infrastructure.

PASDA is an open data portal—meaning that is provides open, free, unrestricted access to data in multiple formats. PASDA provides data storage, data access and retrieval, and metadata services free of charge to its data providers because access to data drives economic development, conservation efforts, and collaboration. The data made available through PASDA is provided by data partners to encourage the widespread sharing of geospatial data, eliminate the creation of redundant data sets, and to further build an inventory (through the development and hosting of metadata) of available data relevant to the Commonwealth.

The PASDA user base is extensive. Users come from a broad spectrum of organizations and backgrounds, from teachers and citizens to businesses and government agencies—PASDA provides free access to data, applications, and customization tools to meet the needs of every user. PASDA saw a dramatic increase of use in almost every sector driven in part by factors such as Marcellus Shale exploration, environmental conservation, economic development initiatives, expanded use of geospatial data in universities, non profits, and the private sector, and the increased interest from average citizens who are able to access geospatial information via PASDA’s data previewer and KML files without the need for specialized GIS software.

The use of PASDA has continually increased over its history. In the past year, almost 2 million files were downloaded from the PASDA FTP site; while usage on the entire site topped 71 million hits, over 28 million page views, and over 1 million unique visitors. The PASDA web servers, which provide access to Internet Map Services and PASDA applications like the Imagery Navigator and PA Atlas supported over 57 million map views. The statistics this year demonstrate more than any other that there is a wide range of data that is of great interest to the user community. Data (and map services created from data) from partners at the PA Department of Environmental Protection, PennDOT, PA Fish and Boat Commission, PA Department of Conservation and Natural Resources, Allegheny County, the DCNR PAMAP Program, and the Delaware Valley Regional Planning Commission received phenomenal use—with map service views and data downloads in the millions or hundreds of thousands. In addition, PASDA has created highly significant applications and services that dramatically increase the value of the data available. The Imagery Navigator supported almost 6.3 million views and the Aerial Photo Cache supported almost 22.4 million views.
