= National Sports Hall of Fame =

The National Sports Hall of Fame was a proposed sports hall of fame on City Island in Harrisburg, Pennsylvania, United States, which was scheduled for completion between July and August 2009. The $34.5M project's likely cancellation was announced by Harrisburg's Mayor Stephen R. Reed in March 2009, with the official closure of the National Sports Hall of Fame Foundation expected later in 2009. Reed was quoted as saying that it would take "some stroke of luck" for a funding source to become available, adding "I don't see it going past this year".

The project plans called for a 120,000-square-foot (11,000 m^{2}) facility to include exhibition space, a theater, meeting areas, office space and other features. The project had found it difficult to raise all of the required funds and in October 2008 Foundation director John Levanda had said, "we're running out of time", citing the global credit crunch.

== See also ==
- Sports in Pennsylvania
- Sports in South Central Pennsylvania
