= Walnut Street Bridge (Harrisburg, Pennsylvania) =

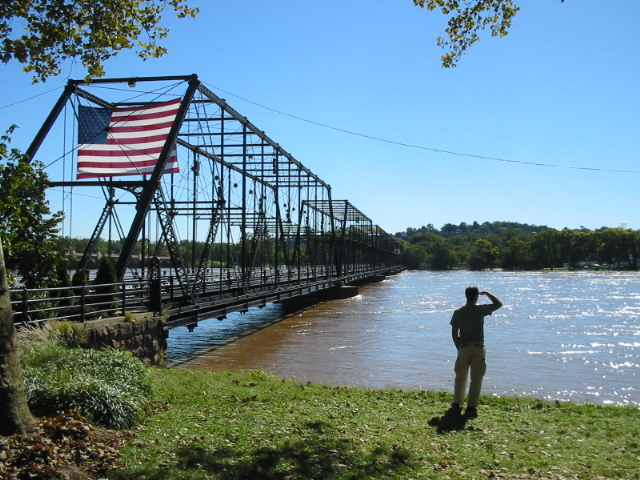
- The bridge in 2004, facing City Island.
- Coordinates: 40.2575°N 76.886°W
- Carries: Pedestrians
- Crosses: Susquehanna River
- Locale: Harrisburg, Pennsylvania
- Other name: The People's Bridge "Old Shakey"
- Maintained by: Pennsylvania Department of Transportation (PennDOT)

Characteristics
- Design: Wrought iron truss bridge
- Total length: 2,801 feet (854 m)
- Longest span: 240 feet (73 m)

History
- Opened: 1890

Pennsylvania Historical Marker
- Designated: N/A

Location
- Interactive map of Walnut Street Bridge

The Walnut Street Bridge also known as The People's Bridge, was a truss bridge that spanned the Susquehanna River from downtown Harrisburg, Pennsylvania to the West Shore until 1996, when ice floes on the flooded river destroyed three spans of the western part of the bridge, between City Island and the West Shore. Built by the Phoenix Bridge Company in 1890, the remaining bridge is the oldest connecting Harrisburg's downtown and Riverfront Park with City Island. A 2014 Cross-River Connections Study notes that the bridge currently serves as an "important bicycle and pedestrian link between City Island and downtown Harrisburg, connecting the city and the Capital Area Greenbelt to special events on City Island."

The bridge was added to the National Register of Historic Places in 1972.

== History ==
The bridge was built to break the toll monopoly enjoyed by the neighboring Camelback Bridge (since replaced by the Market Street Bridge). The Walnut Street Bridge was closed to motor vehicles and converted to a pedestrian and bikeway link to City Island after the 1972 Hurricane Agnes flood. The eastern span of the bridge is outlined in lights which, along with the City Island facilities, create a dynamic visual effect at night. The 2,801-foot (854 m) span is one of the longest pedestrian bridges in the world and was listed on the National Register of Historic Places in 1972. It is also recognized as a Historic Civil Engineering Landmark.

=== 1996 collapse ===
On 20 January 1996, as a result of rising flood waters from the North American blizzard of 1996, the Walnut Street bridge lost two of its seven western spans when high floodwaters and a large ice floe lifted the spans off their foundations and swept them down the river. A third span was damaged and later collapsed into the river. This dramatic scene was recorded by an amateur videographer and shown on national news clips. Shortly after the loss of the three western spans, the People's Bridge Coalition was formed to support the restoration of the bridge. Public surveys in the early 2000s showed overwhelming support for the restoration of the western spans.

Shortly after the 1996 collapse, the Pennsylvania Department of Transportation contracted Modjeski and Masters, Inc., to perform an inspection and analysis to prevent the possibility of future collapse of the remaining structure. A $5 million rehabilitation project was later conducted on the eastern span of the bridge. The rehabilitation project was performed by IA Construction Corporation of Concordville, Pennsylvania. When it was announced that the western span wouldn't be reconstructed, citizens formed The People's Bridge Coalition, which has since reorganized into a non-profit, the Walnut Street Bridge Society.

Gallery

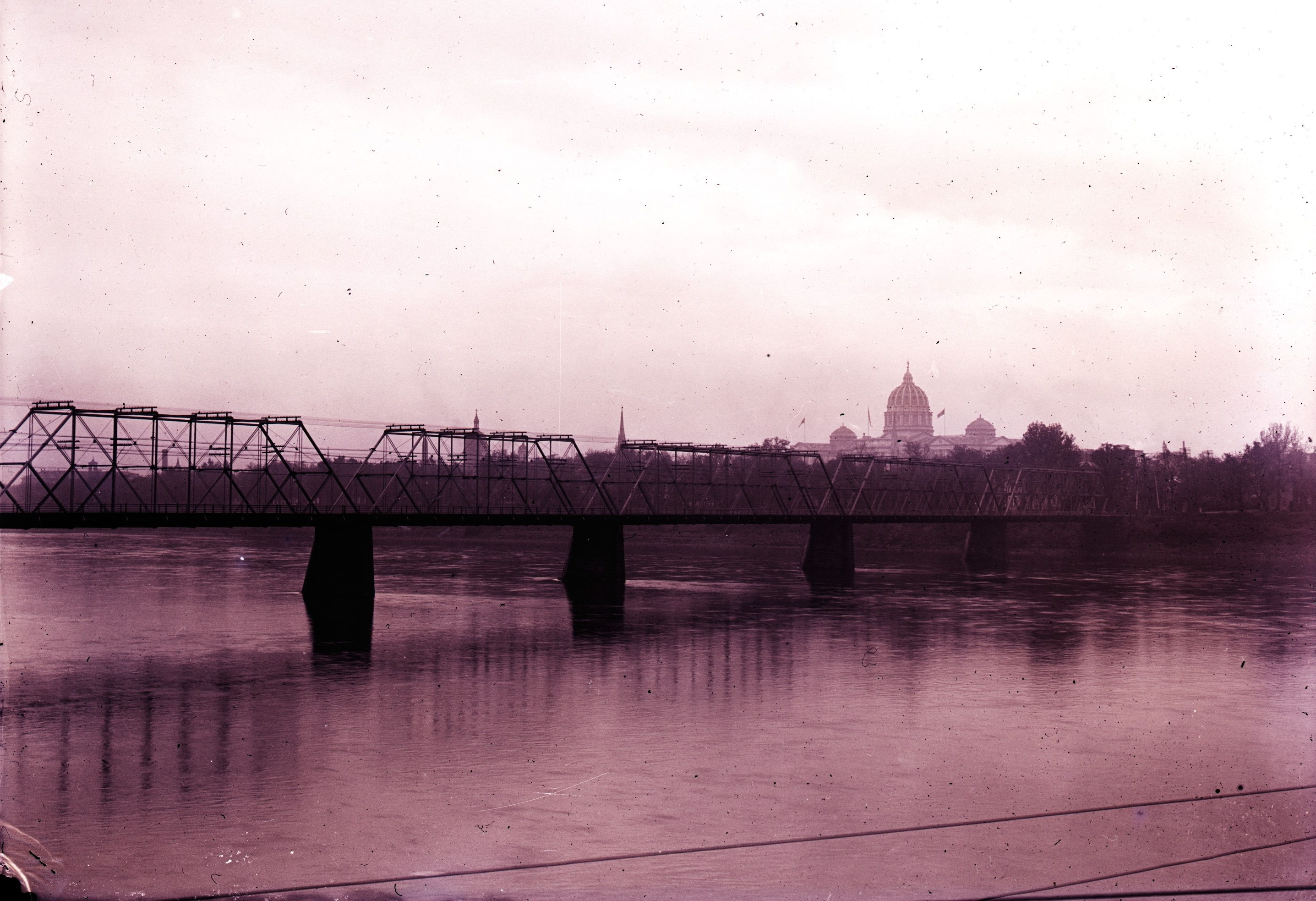
The bridge as seen from City Island in 1908, over the Susquehanna River to Harrisburg

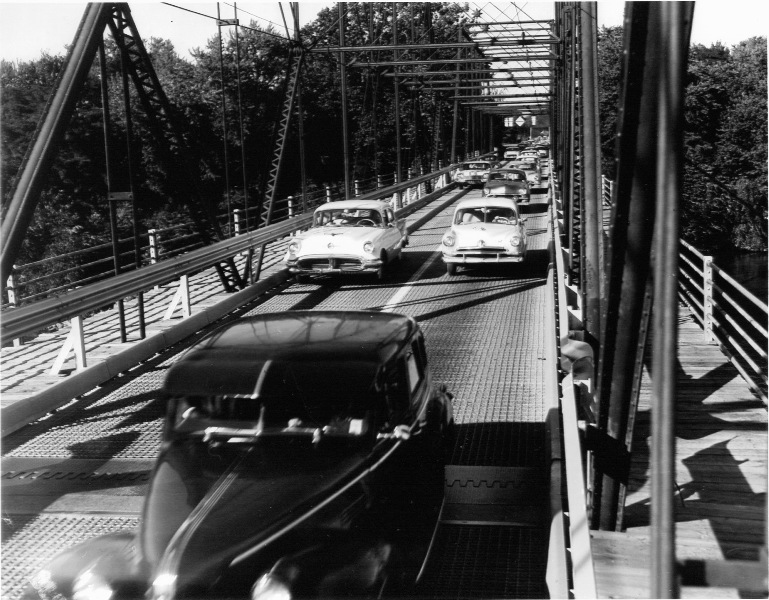
Harrisburg's Walnut St Bridge in 1958 when it was used for automobile traffic.

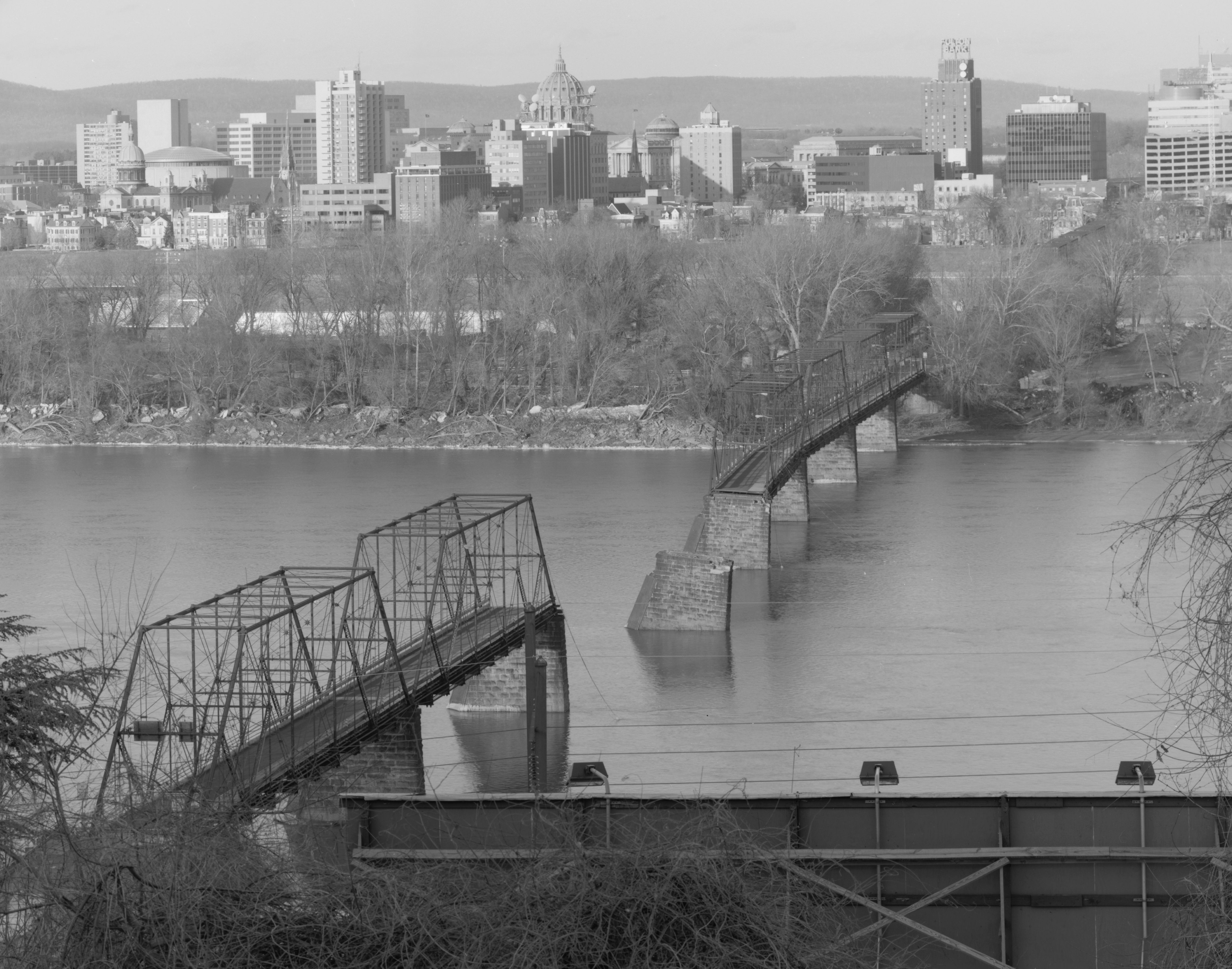
Western span of the Walnut Street Bridge in Harrisburg, Pennsylvania after it collapsed during the 1996 flood.

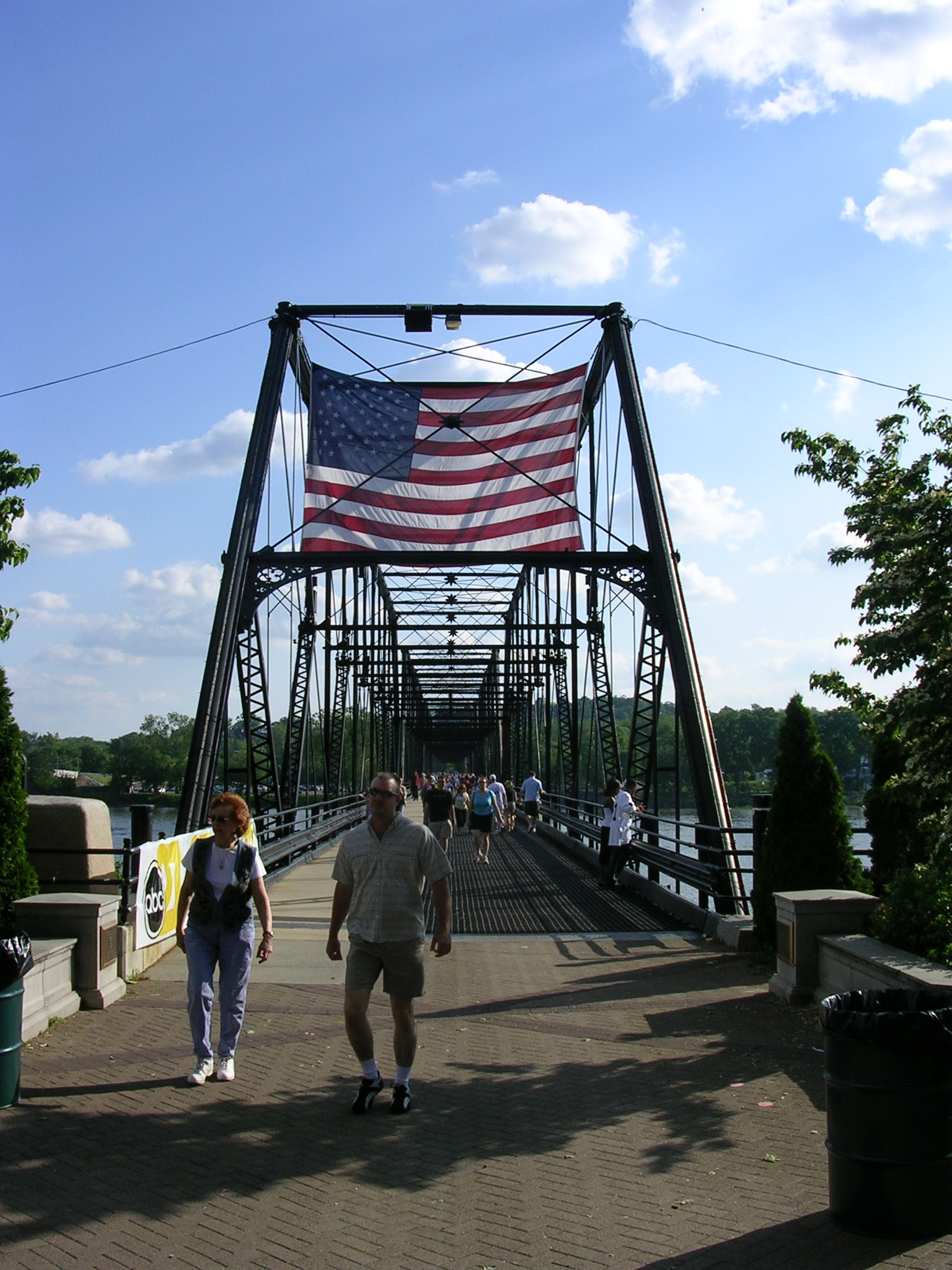
Pedestrians on the Walnut Street Bridge.

== See also ==
- List of bridges documented by the Historic American Engineering Record in Pennsylvania
- List of crossings of the Susquehanna River
