= Market Street Bridge (Susquehanna River) =

Bridge in Harrisburg and Wormleysburg, Pennsylvania

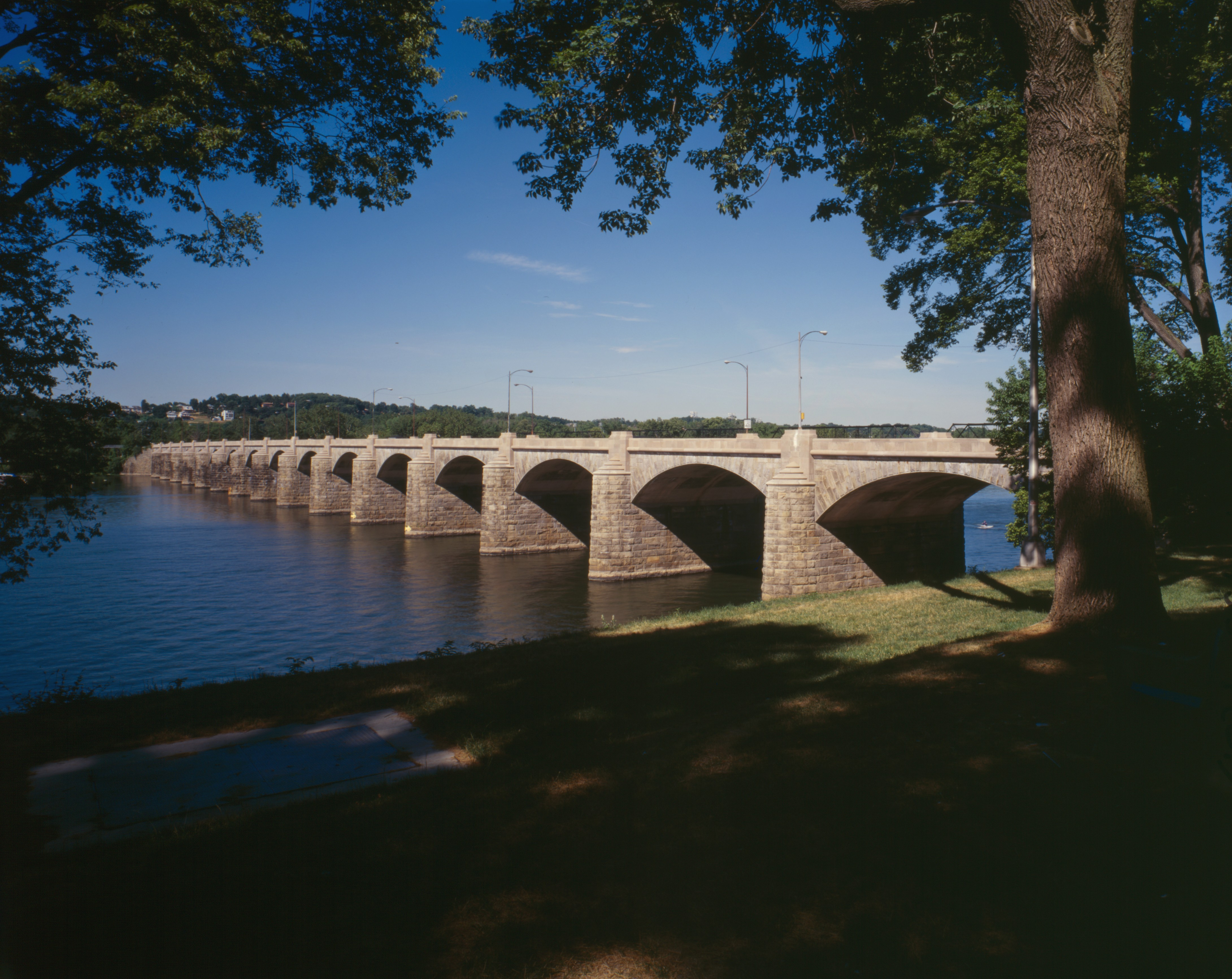
- HAER photo of the Market Street Bridge
- Coordinates: 40°15′24″N 76°53′5″W
- Carries: Market Street and BicyclePA Route J
- Crosses: Susquehanna River
- Locale: Cumberland, Pennsylvania, United States
- Maintained by: PennDOT
- NBI Number: 223012003000000

Characteristics
- Design: U.S. National Register of Historic Places
- Total length: 1,415 ft (431 m)
- Width: 59 ft (18 m)
- Load limit: 49 metric tons (54 short tons)

History
- Constructed by: Modjeski & Masters, Paul Philippe Cret
- Built: 1928
- Market Street Bridge
- U.S. National Register of Historic Places
- MPS: Highway Bridges Owned by the Commonwealth of Pennsylvania, Department of Transportation TR
- NRHP reference No.: 88000759
- Added to NRHP: June 22, 1988

Location
- Interactive map of Market Street Bridge

The Market Street Bridge is a stone arch bridge that spans the Susquehanna River between Harrisburg, Pennsylvania, and Wormleysburg, Pennsylvania. The current structure is the third bridge built at its current location and is the second oldest remaining bridge in Harrisburg. The bridge carries BicyclePA Route J across the river.

The bridge was listed on the National Register of Historic Places on June 22, 1988 and was documented by the Historic American Engineering Record in 1997.

== History ==
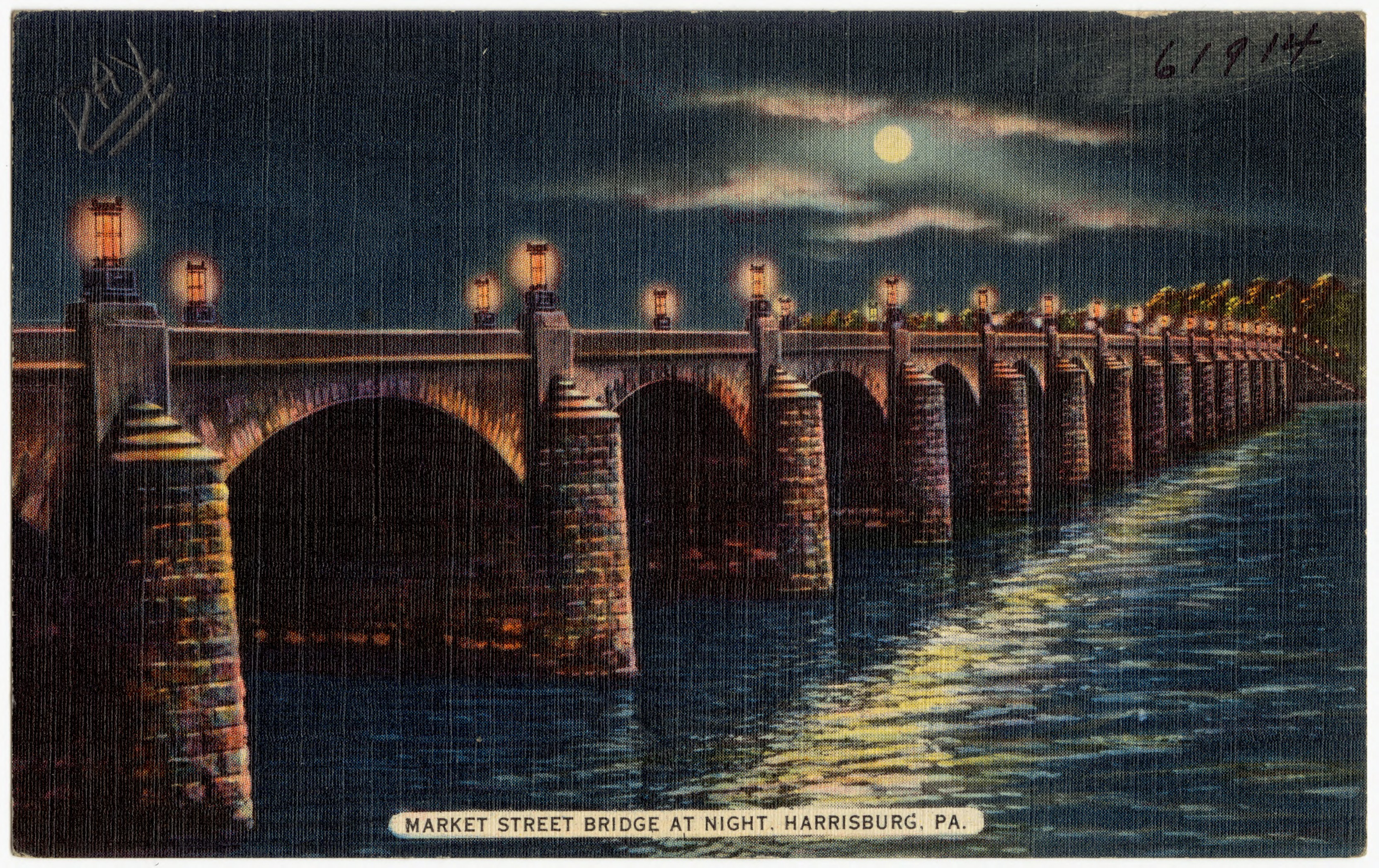
Postcard of the bridge circa 1930-1945

The Camelback Bridge was the first bridge built to cross the Susquehanna River. The Theodore Burr designed bridge was built by Jacob Nailor, starting in 1814, and was opened as a toll bridge in 1820. The Camelback remained the only bridge until the Walnut Street Bridge was built in 1890. In 1902, the Camelback Bridge was destroyed by a flood and in 1905 a two-lane replacement bridge was erected at the same location. The current structure is the result of the widening of the replacement bridge in 1926. Columns at the Harrisburg entrance to the bridge were salvaged from the old State Capitol which burned in 1897.

== See also ==
- List of bridges documented by the Historic American Engineering Record in Pennsylvania
- List of bridges on the National Register of Historic Places in Pennsylvania
- List of crossings of the Susquehanna River
- National Register of Historic Places listings in Dauphin County, Pennsylvania
