= Paxtang Parkway =

- Length: 1.2 mi
- Location: Paxtang, Pennsylvania
- Established: 1906
- Trailheads: Paxtang Park
- Season: Dawn to dusk, year-round
- Maintainer: Capital Area Greenbelt Association
- Website: https://caga.org/paxtang-parkway/

The Paxtang Parkway is a 1.2 mile section of scenic walking paths within the Capital Area Greenbelt in Paxtang, Pennsylvania. Along with Harrisburg's Cameron Parkway, they were the first sections created of the Greenbelt. It includes a series of scenic routes following Spring Creek, connecting Cameron Street to Walnut Street. Cameron Parkway served as a straight shot between Cameron and Derry Streets and then Derry Street to Market Street. The Parkway then led through Reservoir Park and eventually up to Herr Street and then Elmerton Avenue, completing a beltway through Harrisburg.

== History ==
Following the birth of the City Beautiful Movement around 1900, landscape architect Warren Manning envisioned a loop of natural garden pathways around Harrisburg. By 1906, the Paxtang and Cameron Parkways were the two initially built. The historic Rutherford Spring House built over a spring along Spring Creek between 1740-1755 exists along the trail across from Paxtang Park.
