= Spring Creek (Susquehanna River tributary) =

Coordinates: 40°14′26″N 76°51′36″W

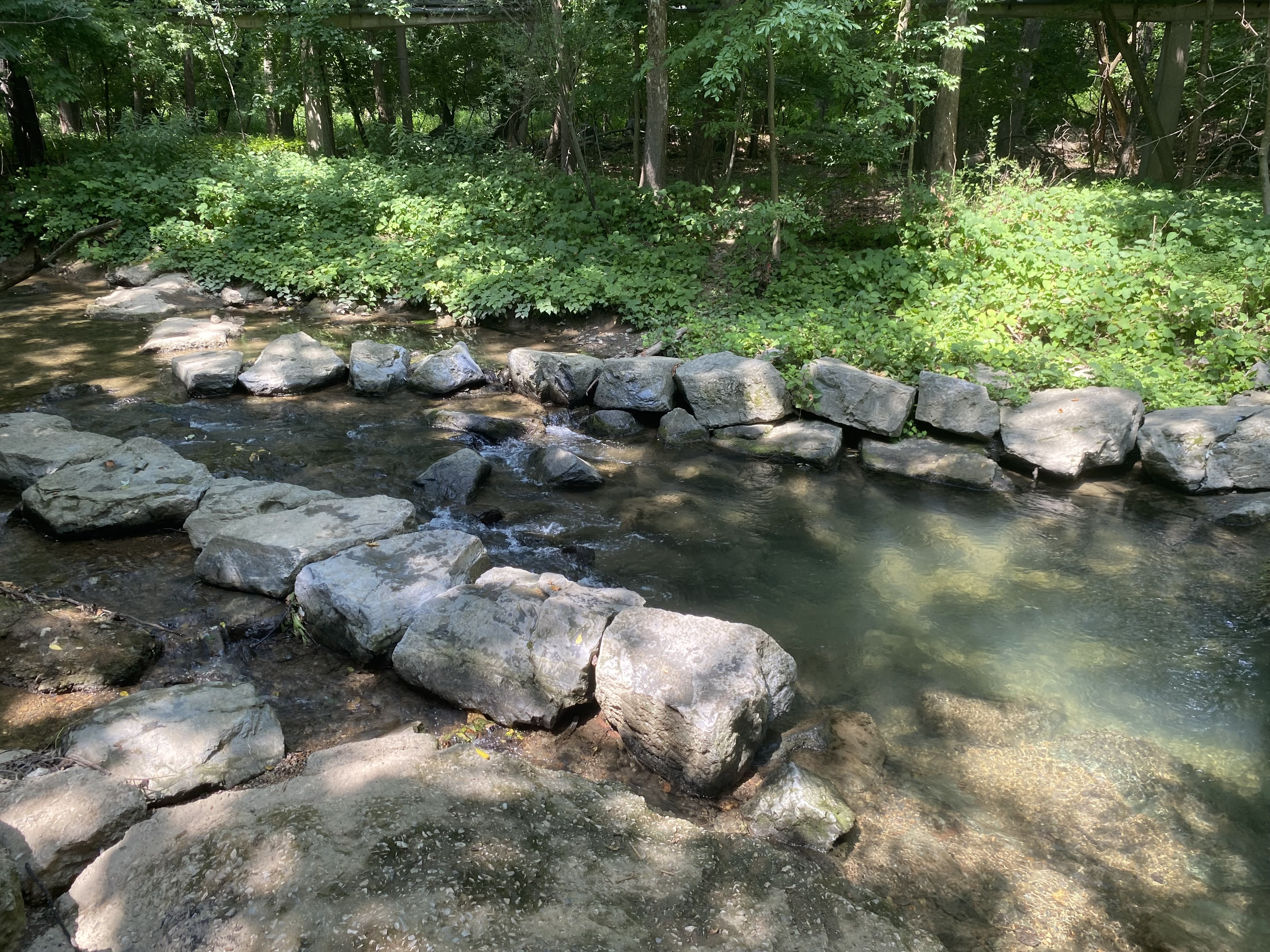
- Spring Creek in Swatara Township

Location
- Country: Dauphin County, Pennsylvania, United States

Physical characteristics
- Source
  - location: Lower Paxton Township, Pennsylvania
  - elevation: 295 feet (90 m)
- Mouth
  - location: Susquehanna River at Harrisburg, Pennsylvania
- Length: 6.0 mi (9.7 km)
- Basin size: 11.6 mi^{2} (30 km^{2})

Spring Creek is a 6.0-mile-long (9.7 km) tributary of the Susquehanna River in Dauphin County, Pennsylvania, in the United States.

Spring Creek rises in Lower Paxton Township, flowing through adjacent areas such as Paxtang, Oakleigh, Progress, Lawnton, and Colonial Park. The stream flows in a westerly direction, eventually joining the Susquehanna River in southern Harrisburg. The tributary Slotznick Run enters Spring Creek at Progress.

Spring Creek parallels the 2-mile stretch of the Cameron Parkway section of the Capital Area Greenbelt in South Harrisburg and the Paxtang Parkway in Paxtang. Spring Creek joins the Susquehanna at Harrisburg, just near the confluence of the Paxton Creek. The historical Rutherford Springhouse was built over a Paxtang portion of the creek in the 1740s to store perishable foods. Paxtang Park is located along the creek's banks.

== Tributaries ==
- Parkway Creek (also called Paxtang Tributary)
- Slotznick Run

== See also ==
- List of rivers of Pennsylvania
