= Black Run =

Black Run may refer to:

- Black Run (Paxton Creek), in Dauphin County, Pennsylvania
- Black Run (Spruce Run), in Union County, Pennsylvania

== See also ==
- Black Creek (disambiguation)
- Black River (disambiguation)
