= Harrisburg in the American Civil War =

During the American Civil War, Pennsylvania was the second largest state in the Union, and Harrisburg was the state's capital. Located at the intersection of important railroads, Harrisburg proved an important supply and logistics center for the dissemination and transportation of materiel for the Union Army. Tens of thousands of new recruits were mustered into service or drilled at a series of Harrisburg-area United States Army training camps, including the sprawling Camp Curtin. Confederate forces under Lieutenant General Richard S. Ewell threatened Harrisburg during the June 1863 Gettysburg campaign, but were instead called by General Robert E. Lee to return to the Gettysburg campaign. Pennsylvania Governor Andrew Curtin ordered local workers to erect a series of forts and earthworks to protect the city, which then had a population of 13,000 residents.

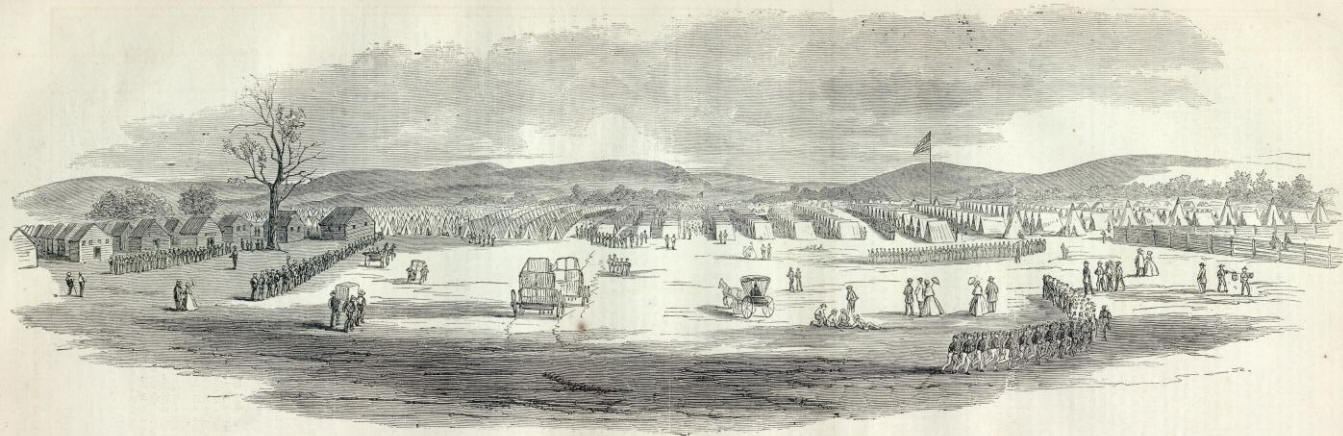

An artist's panorama of Camp Curtin published in Harper's Weekly, September 13, 1862

== Invasion ==
Harrisburg was a significant training center for the Union Army with tens of thousands of troops passing through Camp Curtin. It was also a major rail center and a vital link between the Atlantic coast and the Midwest, with several railroads running through the city and over the Susquehanna River. As a result of this importance, it was a target of Robert E. Lee's Army of Northern Virginia during its two invasions. The first time during the 1862 Maryland Campaign, when Lee planned to capture the city after taking Harpers Ferry, West Virginia, but was prevented from doing so by the Battle of Antietam and his subsequent retreat back into Virginia.

The second attempt was made during the Gettysburg Campaign and was more substantial. Two full divisions of Richard S. Ewell's Second Corps approached Harrisburg in June 1863 from the southwest through Cumberland County, while a third division under Jubal Early planned to cross the Susquehanna River at Wrightsville, Pennsylvania, and attack Harrisburg from the rear. In response, Union Maj. Gen. Darius N. Couch, commanding the Department of the Susquehanna, dispatched troops to the present day borough of Camp Hill, located in the Cumberland Valley approximately two miles west of Harrisburg. Laborers hired by Couch quickly erected earthworks and fortifications along the western portion of Bridgeport, adjacent to Camp Hill. The two largest of these became known as "Fort Couch" and "Fort Washington."

On June 29, two Confederate cavalry companies attacked Union militia positions around Oyster Point, but were driven back with two wounded. This allowed officers from Ewell's staff to get a view of Harrisburg's fortifications from what is today the Drexel Hills development of New Cumberland. Based on their information, Ewell prepared for an attack but that same day Lee ordered Ewell to pull back. Lee had recently discovered that the Union Army of the Potomac was closer than he thought and desired to concentrate his forces near the South Mountain range to parry oncoming Union forces, a move that culminated in the Battle of Gettysburg.

Ewell left two cavalry units behind at a place known as Sporting Hill, on the west side of Camp Hill. Brigadier General William F. Smith, commanding the 1st Division of the Department of the Susquehanna, sent two militia infantry regiments and a cavalry company to locate the Confederates. The two forces collided the next day, fighting a short skirmish at Sporting Hill before the Confederates withdrew. This is considered by many to be the northernmost battle of the Civil War.

== Civil War sites in modern Harrisburg ==
Perhaps the most known Civil War attraction in the Harrisburg area is the National Civil War Museum, located on a large hill in Reservoir Park. The museum features collections of Civil War artifacts, interpretative displays, dioramas, and seasonal or temporary exhibits. Some 390 historic Civil War battleflags are available for tour at the Capitol Preservation Committee's Civil War Flag facility in Harrisburg, along with an interpretive exhibit which highlights the development and use of flags in battle. The site of historic Camp Curtin is marked with wayside markers, as are surviving sections of the defensive earthworks south of Harrisburg in Lemoyne. A statue of Confederate general Albert G. Jenkins was erected in Mechanicsburg in 2005 to commemorates the cavalry commander, but was later removed. The State Museum of Pennsylvania in downtown Harrisburg has a modest, but historically significant collection of artifacts, paintings, and war relics.

== Works cited ==
- Coddington, Edwin B., The Gettysburg Campaign; a study in command, Scribner's, 1968, ISBN 0-684-84569-5.
