= David Fleming (politician) =

American politician

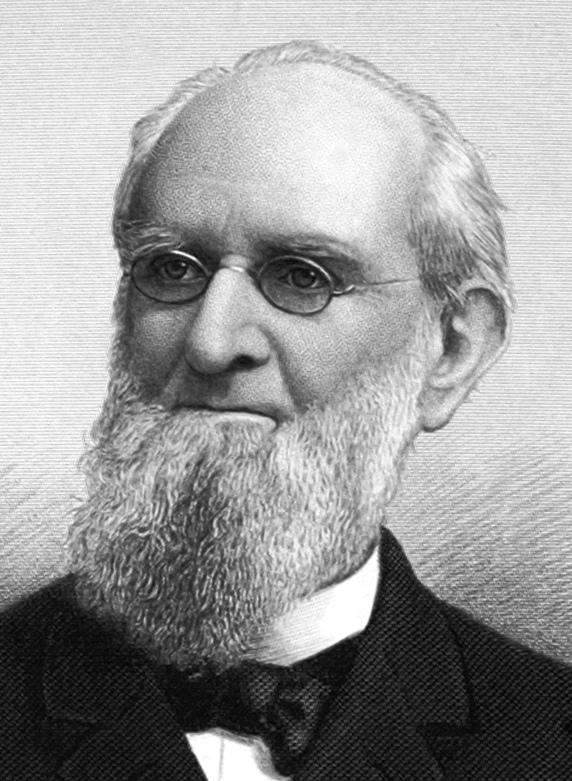
- Portrait of Fleming from The Atlantic c.1890

Member of the Pennsylvania Senate from the 15th district
- In office 1864–1864
- In office 1866–1866
- Preceded by: Amos R. Boughter
- Succeeded by: David B. Montgomery

Member of the Pennsylvania Senate from the 16th district
- In office 1865–1865
- Preceded by: John M. Dunlap
- Succeeded by: G. Dawson Coleman

District Attorney, Dauphin County
- In office 1854–1856

Clerk of the Pennsylvania House of Representatives
- In office 1847–1847

Personal details
- Born: July 17, 1812 Washington County, Pennsylvania
- Died: January 14, 1890 (age 77) Harrisburg, Pennsylvania
- Party: Republican
- Spouse: Susanna née Mowry
- Children: 4
- Occupation: Newspaper editor

David Fleming (1812-1890) was an American politician from Pennsylvania who served in the Pennsylvania Senate as a member of the Republican Party, representing the 15th district and 16th district from 1864 to 1866.

== Biography ==
Fleming was born in rural Washington County on July 17, 1812 to Samuel and Sarah Fleming. Shortly after his birth his family moved to West Hanover township. Fleming attended the Harrisburg Academy before becoming a carpenter's clerk. Over the course of his career he would work as a clerk for the Baltimore and Port Deposit railroad, as a member of the board for the Lochiel Iron Company, as the director of the Harrisburg National Bank, founder of the Harrisburg Gas Company and Harrisburg City Passenger Railway Company, and as a reporter and the editor for the United States' Gazette from 1838 to 1847, specializing in reporting on the goings-on in the State Capitol while also working as an attorney from 1841 to his death in 1890.

He was elected the clerk of the Pennsylvania House of Representatives for a single year term in 1847 and a single two year term as Dauphin County District Attorney from 1854 to 1856 refusing re-election. Fleming was elected to a single term in the State Senate in 1864, serving in both the 16th and 15th districts, as he was redistricted back and forth between the two. In the senate he served on the Judiciary committee, and was elected Speaker of the Pennsylvania Senate in 1865, giving the closing remarks of the 1864-1866 senatorial session where he advocated for increased pensions to the widows of Civil War veterans, and for more funds to be dedicated to the reconstruction of Chambersburg after its destruction by Confederate forces.

== Personal life ==
Fleming married Susanna née Mowry and the couple had four children, Charles Mowry Fleming, Sarah née Fleming, David Fleming, and George Richmond Fleming. David Fleming was a trustee of the Home of the Friendless and was a member of the board of trustees for the Market Square Presbyterian Church which he was a lifelong member.
