= De Benneville Randolph Keim =

American diplomat (1841–1914)

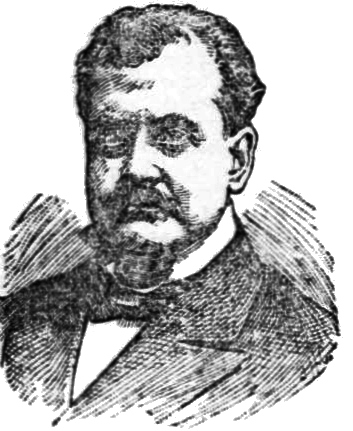
- De B. Keim, circa 1890
- Born: Benneville Randolph Keim; January 1841; Reading, Pennsylvania, U.S.
- Died: May 24, 1914 (aged 73); Washington, D.C., U.S.
- Resting place: Charles Evans Cemetery
- Other names: DeBenneville Randolph Keim, De B. Randolph Keim
- Occupations: New York Herald correspondent (American Civil War and American Plains) and special agent to U.S. consulates in Asia, China, Egypt, and South America (1870)
- Known for: Being an advisor and confidant to Ulysses S. Grant during the U.S. Civil War and Grant's presidency
- Spouse: Jane Sumner Owen Keim

De Benneville Randolph Keim (January 1, 1841 – May 24, 1914), also known as "De B. Randolph Keim", was a 19th-century journalist who became a war-time confidant of Ulysses S. Grant, the commanding general of the Union Army, during the American Civil War, and remained an advisor to Grant through his presidency. In 1870, he was appointed by Grant as a special agent charged with inspecting America's consular offices in Asia, China, Egypt, and South America.

Post-war, Keim continued to work as a journalist, reporting from the American Plains, an experience which served as background for his 1885 book, Sheridan’s Troopers on the Borders: A Winter Campaign on the Plains.

== Early life and education ==
Born in Reading, Pennsylvania, on New Year's Day, 1841 (alternate birth date: January 2), Keim's name was shown on records during the early part of his life as "Benneville Randolph" and then, beginning sometime around the early 1860s, as "De Benneville Randolph" or "De B. Randolph" when he embarked on his career in journalism. A son of Berks County, Pennsylvania, native and merchant John High Keim (c. 1817–1858) and Cumberland County, Virginia, native Martha Elizabeth (Randolph) Keim (1818-1890), Benneville R. Keim was christened at Reading's Christ Episcopal Church on July 26, 1841, and was reared in the city's northwest ward with his siblings: Mary High (1842–1891), Edward Tudor (1845–1929), Virginia Randolph (1846–1896), Anna H. (born circa 1848), Peyton Randolph (1850–1905), and John Otto (1855–1941).

In 1855, Benneville Keim relocated with his family to Dubuque, Iowa, where his father had entered into a business partnership with bankers F.S. Jesup & Co. (later Redmond, Lovell & Co.). His father's health failed after the move, however, and he succumbed to his ailments in South Charles County, Missouri on October 29, 1858. He and his family continued to reside in Dubuque until 1866 when his mother made the decision to return to Pennsylvania.

During his formative years, he was educated in the schools of the communities where he resided. He then attended, but did not graduate from, Beloit College in Beloit, Wisconsin.

== American Civil War ==
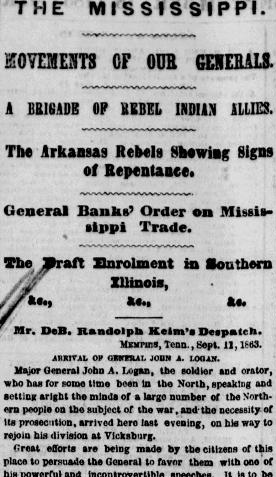
Excerpt of Civil War report by DeB. Randolph Keim from Memphis, Tennessee, New York Herald, Sept. 18, 1863.

In response to President Abraham Lincoln's call for volunteer troops to defend the nation's capital following the fall of Fort Sumter to Confederate troops in mid-April 1861, Benneville Randolph Keim raised a company of men in Harrisburg, Pennsylvania, for enlistment. Known as the First City Zouaves (and later as the Harrisburg City Grays), his men "served with great credit for nine months as Company A, One hundred and twenty-seventh Pennsylvania Volunteers" (127th Pennsylvania Infantry). Keim subsequently resigned, prior to the regiment's departure for the front lines of the American Civil War, to take a position as a Civil War correspondent for the New York Herald. According to Washington's Evening Star:

[Keim's] dispatches were notable for their accuracy and wealth of detail. One of his reports, describing the ability of Gen. Grant in his usual original style, was a factor in bringing about Grant's selection and commander of the Union Army, it was said. A week after this dispatch was printed Gen. Grant was placed in full command of the armies. The general formed a great attachment for Mr. Keim, saying of him that he had never violated a confidence."

== Later life ==
After the war, Keim continued to report to the Herald from the American Plains; however, his affiliation with that publication ended sometime prior to 1877, according to The Cincinnati Daily Star. When applying for his U.S. Passport on June 21, 1865, he was described as being a 24-year-old man who was 5'7 tall with brown hair and an oval face with broad forehead, brown eyes, straight nose, small mouth, and fair complexion. Compiling documents related to his experiences from his Plains reporting days in preparation for the release of his 1885 book, Sheridan’s Troopers on the Borders: A Winter Campaign on the Plains, he entered into the editorial phase of the publication process in the spring of 1870.

That process was interrupted during the summer of 1870, however, when he was appointed to an investigatory post by President Ulysses S. Grant, and directed to inspect and report back regarding operations at United States consulates in Asia, the Middle East, and South America. In notifying him of that appointment, via a letter from the Executive Mansion on July 19, 1870, Grant wrote, "you are hereby appointed to examine into the accounts of Consular officers of the United States and into all matters connected with the business of their said offices", adding that Keim would be compensated "at the rate of five thousand dollars ($5,000), per annum and actual necessary expenses". Grant then subsequently extended Keim's assignment three times.

According to historian Charles Stuart Kennedy, "[t]he best overall view of the U.S. consular service after almost one hundred years was provided by De Benneville Randolph Keim." His objective was "to look at the accounts of consular officers and to find out how their affairs were conducted abroad." Engaged in the assignment from August 1870 through December 1872, Keim traveled a total of 47,685 miles while "visiting posts in Japan, China, the Malay Peninsula, Java, India, and Egypt, and on the east and west coasts of Latin America, including the Isthmus of Panama, Ecuador, Peru, Chile, Uruguay, and Brazil".

At some ports I have found gentlemen worthy of the name of consul of the United States struggling under a miserable pittance from the Government, and yet now have the respect of those around them by their personal demeanor. At other ports I have found men unworthy of the commission they held, living in elegance out of the moneys of the Government, or worse still, living upon the benefits of a humane law, which properly applied would lessen the sufferings of the American sailor.... Almost every consulate had some defects in its history, owing to the incompetency, low habits and vulgarity of some of its officers, during the endless round of evils incident to official rotation. Abuses had been committed in the collection of fees; in the exercise of judicial powers; in the adjustment of business affairs of American citizens; in the settlement, where permitted, of the estates of intestate American citizens dying abroad; in selling the American flag; in "running out" ships; in discharging seamen; in affording relief or medical attendance to destitute or sick American seamen; in establishing American settlements abroad; in issuing illegal passports; in countenancing shipping masters; in taxing Chinese immigrants.

Arriving first at a consular office in Japan, Keim determined that the consul there was "utterly inacapable", was "ignorant of the law", and had charged visitors illegally "for advice given on judicial and consular matters." In China, he discovered that Consul General George F. Seward had enriched himself by keeping the fees from his sale of "licenses to bars and boardinghouses in the American part of Shanghai", diverting the seamen's funds at his disposal to speculative ventures, and "selling the privilege of flying the American flag to Chinese owners of junks, granting them certain immunities and advantages in the river and coastal trade." Keim did, however, have praise for at least one consul general—Charles W. LeGendre—for the appropriate and economical operation of the consular jail in his assigned territory (Amoy). Twice wounded—severely—during the Civil War while serving at the commanding officer of the 51st New York Infantry, LeGendre also distinguished himself post-war, in his capacity as consul general, by successfully persuading tribal leaders in Formosa to protect shipwrecked American seamen. As his inspection tour progressed, Keim noted that the records management and seamen's support services in Java and India were among the few that were being handled appropriately, and that staff at other offices were sincerely trying to "[clean] up the messes left behind by less scrupulous predecessors [and] run straightforward operations with balanced and accurate books", according to Kennedy.

During this assignment, Keim reportedly also came into possession of a copy of a decree from the government of China concerning the Tientsin Massacre. The translated document was published by the New York Herald on June 18, 1871.

A year later, on June 25, 1872, Keim wed Hartford, Connecticut, native Jane Sumner Owen. According to historian Mary Simmerson Cunningham Logan, the couple traveled for six months following their wedding, visiting "the localities associated with their ancestral families and nearly all the countries of Europe, extending their journey to Nijni Novgorod, on the Volga." They then welcomed the August 1, 1873, and July 9, 1874 births at their Massachusetts home of daughters Elizabeth Randolph (1873–1970), who became the wife, on June 25, 1895, of Charles Willauer Kutz, lieutenant-general, U.S. Army Corps of Engineers; and Harriet Virginia (1874–1924), who never married.

By 1880, Keim was residing with his wife and young daughters on Hill Road in Reading, Pennsylvania. As their lives unfolded, his work began to appear in multiple publications, including the Philadelphia Times, while his wife became increasingly involved with the Daughters of the American Revolution (D.A.R.).

Tragedy truck the Keim family in late 1885 when Keim's young son and namesake, De Benneville Keim (1880–1885), died in Reading at the age of five on November 22. The following June, Christ Episcopal Church installed a new stained glass window in memory of the boy.

By the end of the decade, columnists for Washington, D.C.'s Evening Star were noting that Keim's wife and daughters spent summers at their cottage at Martha's Vineyard while Keim stayed behind at their home in Washington, D.C., in order to cover Congress while it was in session. When it wasn't, he spent weekends at "Edge Mount", the family's "picturesque home" in Reading, Pennsylvania.

During the 1890s, his journalism career also involved writing about society news. According to The Wichita Daily Eagle, which ran an extensive biographical sketch of him under the headline, “Of Deb. Randolph Keim: The Best Society Writer in Washington Is a Man”:

Mr. Keim is the court chronicler of the republic, the semi-official, recognized and authoritative purveyor of the news of society. There are other society reporters, plenty of them, and many who report more news and write more gossip than he, but whatever Keim writes goes unquestioned as to its accuracy and undoubted as to its authority.... Mr. Keim, though the descendant of one of the best families in Pennsylvania, had no aristocratic training for his work. He approached the social field by the military road. During the war of the rebellion he was correspondent of The New York Herald. While at the front for his paper he formed friendships with such great generals as Grant, Sherman, Sheridan and McPherson, friendships which lasted as long as these men lived. It was to Mr. Keim that Gen. Grant said just before they took him to Mount McGregor, "I shall be dead within six weeks."

Present when President William McKinley was shot in Buffalo on September 6, 1901, Keim quickly wrote down what he had seen, and penned his "Extraordinary Eyewitness Account of the Assassination of President McKinley" the next day. A week later, McKinley died from his wounds (on September 14).

In 1912, he became a widower when his wife, Jane Sumner Owen Keim, died at their home in Reading, Pennsylvania on November 22.

== Death ==
Keim died at the Walter Reed Hospital in Washington, D.C., on May 24, 1914. His remains were returned to Berks County, Pennsylvania. Following funeral services, he was laid to rest at the Charles Evans Cemetery in Reading. In its May 25 obituary for Keim, The Washington Post observed:

Mr. Keim's dispatches during the civil war were notable for their original style, accuracy, and wealth of detail. It Is said that one of his dispatches, which described the methods of Gen. Grant and dealt with his ability as a commander, was one of the prime factors in bringing about Grant's selection as commander of the Union forces. When Grant became President he commissioned Mr. Keim to inspect the United States consulates in every part of the world.... Following the close of the war Mr. Keim continued in newspaper work, becoming one of the foremost of the Washington correspondents.

== Notable works ==
Keim's works included:

- Keim, De B. Randolph, Appleton P.C. Griffin, et.al. Sherman: A Memorial in Art, Oratory, and Literature by the Society of the Army of the Tennessee with the Aid of the Congress of the United States of America. Washington, D.C.: Government Printing Office, 1904. OCLC 166631098
- Keim, De B. A Guide to the Potomac River, Chesapeake Bay and James River, and an Ocean Voyage to Northern Ports. A Series of Interesting and Instructive Excursions by Water from Washington. Washington, D.C.: Self-published, 1881. OCLC 978693580
- Keim, De B. Randolph. Handbook Of Official and Social Etiquette and Public Ceremonials at Washington, Second Edition. Washington, D.C.: Self-published, 1886. OCLC 975141957
- Keim, De B. Randolph. Keim's Illustrated Hand-book. Washington and Its Environs: A Descriptive and Historical Hand-book of the Capital of the United States of America. Washington, D.C.: Self-published, 1886. OCLC 8557743
- Keim, De B. Randolph. Reports of De B. Randolph Keim, agent of the United States, etc., to the secretary of the Treasury, relating to the condition of the consulates of the United States in Japan, China, Cochin China, Malay Peninsula, Java, British India, Egypt, and on the east and west coasts of South America. Washington, D.C.: Government Printing Office, 1871. OCLC 975473884
- Keim, De B. Randolph. San Domingo: Pen Pictures And Leaves Of Travel, Romance And History, From The Portfolio Of A Correspondent In The American Tropics. Philadelphia, Pennsylvania: Claxton, Remsen & Haffelfinger, 1870. OCLC 982565433
- Keim, De B. Randolph. Sheridan’s Troopers on the Borders: A Winter Campaign on the Plains. Philadelphia, Pennsylvania: David McKay, 1885. OCLC 35703698
