= Wildwood Park (Pennsylvania) =

Public park and nature sanctuary in Harrisburg, Pennsylvania

Coordinates: 40.315°N 76.885°W

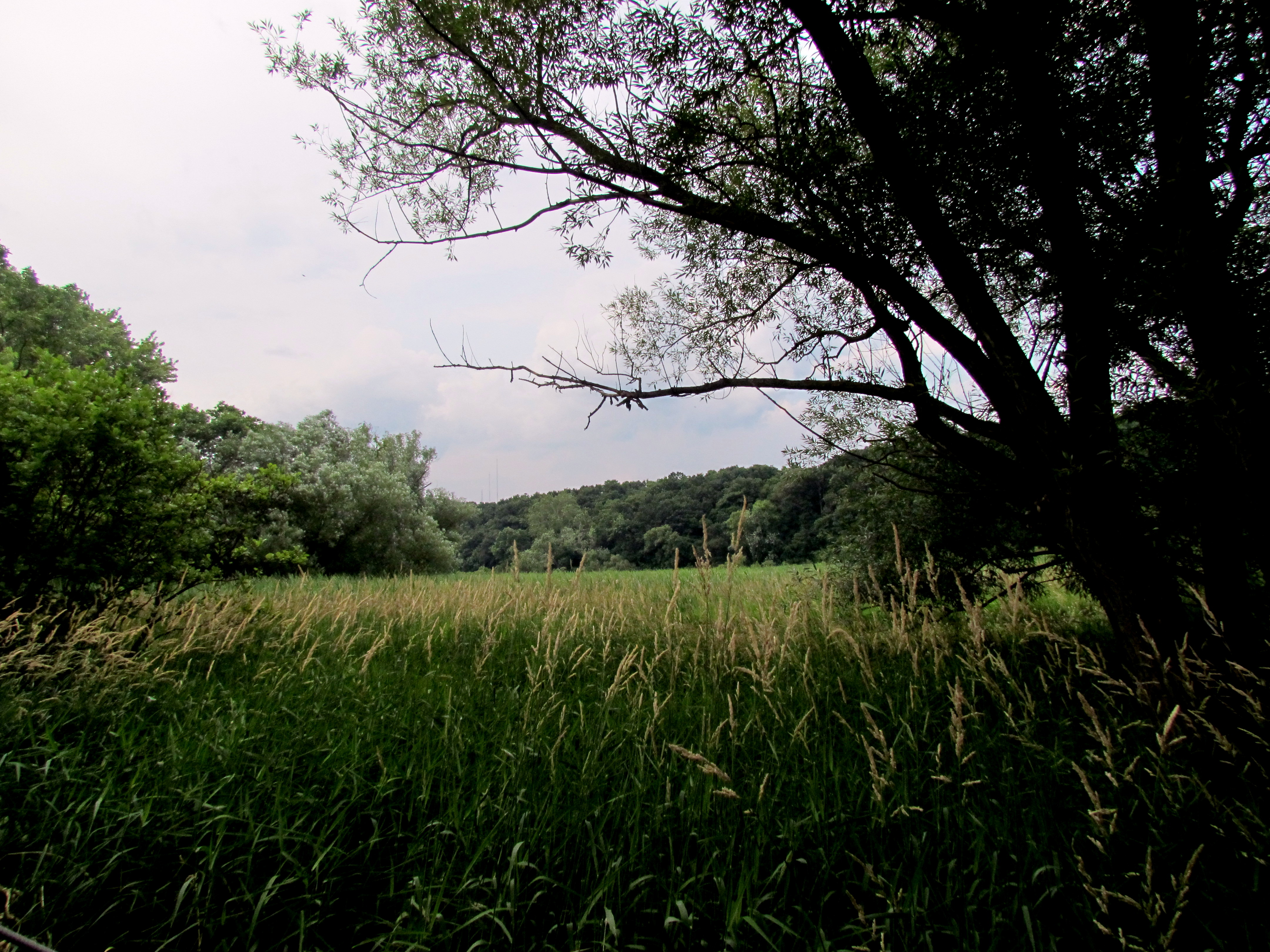
- A view of aquatic vegetation growing in the wetlands
- Location: 100 Wildwood Way; Harrisburg, Pennsylvania
- Area: 229 acres (93 ha)
- Created: 1901
- Operator: Dauphin County Parks and Recreation Department
- Visitors: 85,000
- Paths: 6+ mi
- Website: Wildwood Park website

Wildwood Park is a public park and nature sanctuary in Harrisburg, Pennsylvania. The 229-acre park is known for its 90-acre shallow lake with over 6 miles of trails and mile-long boardwalk over the wetlands. The park is located within the city limits of Harrisburg; however, it is administered and maintained by the Dauphin County Parks and Recreation Department. Wildwood Park runs in line with Paxton Creek, a tributary of the Susquehanna River, on the northern side of Harrisburg and adjacent to the main campus of HACC, Central Pennsylvania's Community College. Paxton Creek feeds into the lake, which comprises 60% of the Park. A section of the old Pennsylvania Canal runs parallel to the western trail. The remainder of the park is mixed deciduous forest, and an artificial meadow overlooks the eastern side of the lake. Wildwood Park is also part of the Capital Area Greenbelt.

== Benjamin Olewine III Nature Center ==
The 4,000 square foot Benjamin Olewine III Nature Center, opened in 1999, features exhibits about the natural history of the park and the Susquehanna Valley area. Environmental education programs are offered for school groups. The center won multiple awards for the design of its programming.

== History ==
In 1901, the City of Harrisburg established Wildwood Park on an area known as "Wetzel's Swamp" as a part of the City Beautiful movement, a nationwide reform effort conceived by social reformers to build civic loyalty and a sense of community among urban dwellers. The lake was formed in 1908 by damming Paxton Creek, which then allowed paths to be laid around it and other facilities established, such as a baseball field, a zoo, riding stables, and boating operations. In 1964, the city deeded 157 acres of the park to Harrisburg Area Community College for the construction of a campus and academic buildings. In 1976, the Dauphin County Commissioners and Harrisburg City Council agreed to the Wildwood Park transfer agreement, and the park was acquired by the county for $1. The Friends of Wildwood Park non-profit was organized in 1987 to support and promote enhancements of the park.
