= Christ Episcopal Church (Reading, Pennsylvania) =

Coordinates: 40.33633°N 75.92876°W

- St. Mary's Parish (1765)
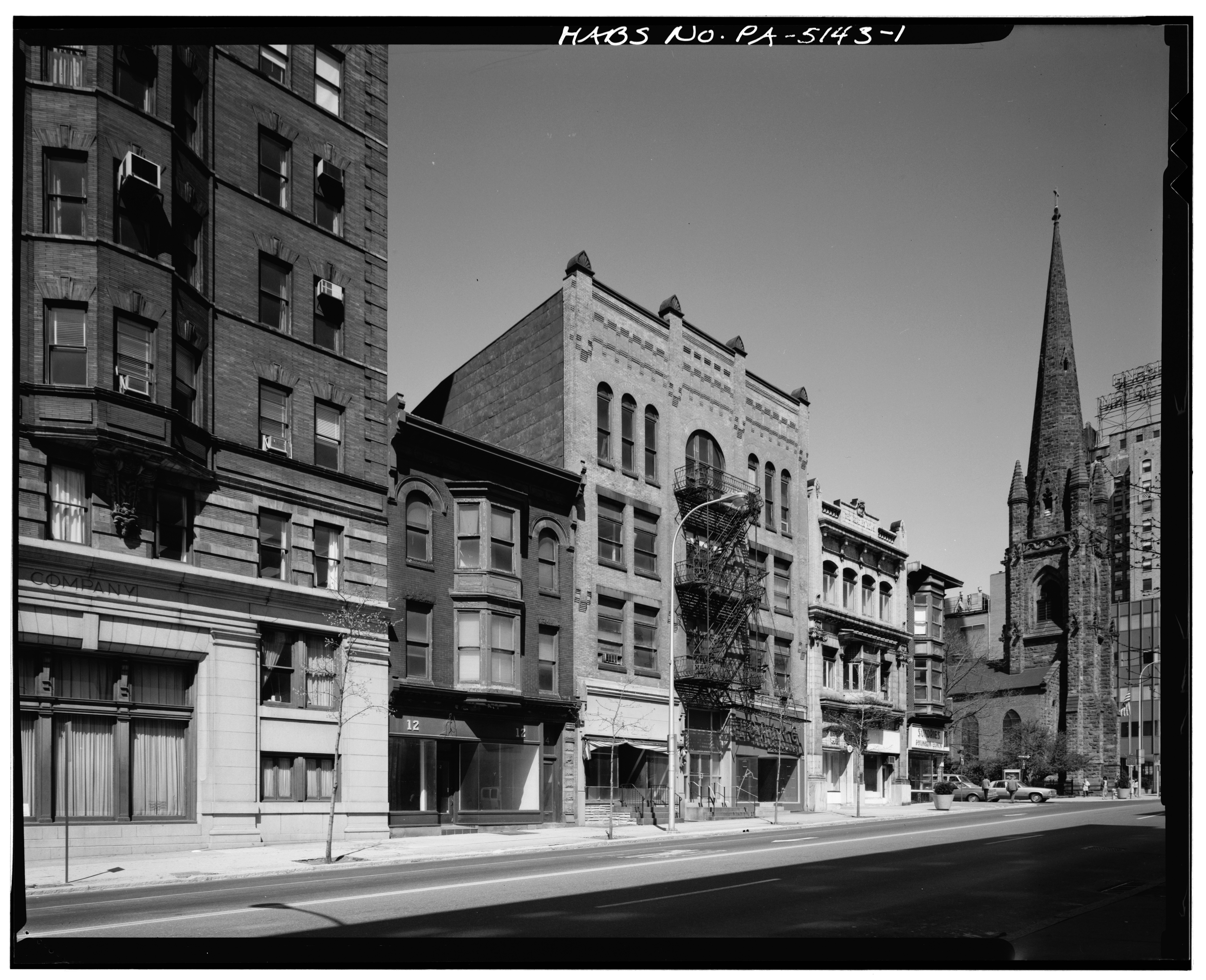
- Christ Episcopal Church (at right), circa mid-1900s
- Christ Episcopal Church
- Location: Reading, Pennsylvania
- Address: 435 Court Street, Reading, Pennsylvania 19601
- Country: United States
- Language: English
- Denomination: Episcopal Church (United States)
- Website: http://rdgchristchurch.org/live/

History
- Former name: Christ Church (1815)
- Founded: 1763 (congregation begun); 1823 (formal ministry); 1824 (Episcopal Diocese acceptance); 1825-1826 (church construction)
- Founder(s): The Rev. Alexander Murray (church mission, 1763); The Rev. Robert Davis (first rector, 1823)
- Dedicated: May 10, 1826 (official church consecration)
- Earlier dedication: June 8, 1825 (cornerstone laid)

Christ Episcopal Church, founded in 1763, is the oldest, English-speaking, religious congregation in Reading, Pennsylvania. The church is located on the northwest corner of Fifth and Court Streets. Its nave was built c. 1826.

Its church ledgers have recorded the membership of multiple prominent Pennsylvanians, including De Benneville Randolph Keim, a nineteenth-century journalist who served as an advisor to Ulysses S. Grant, the commanding general of the Union Army during the American Civil War, and David McMurtrie Gregg, an American Civil War-era major general who won fame for gallantry during the Battle of Gettysburg in 1863.

== History ==
Christ Church was officially organized under the ministry of the Rev. Robert Davis, who commenced missionary services in Reading in the spring of 1823. The present building was built between 1825–26. Its neo-gothic form took shape during a major renovation in 1847. The spire was constructed in the early 1860s by Edward Tuckerman Potter, an architect with expertise in Episcopal church design. Among its earliest rectors was Henry John Whitehouse, later Bishop of Illinois.

=== 1700s ===
According to historian Morton L. Montgomery, the first historical reference to the worship of Episcopalians in Berks County, Pennsylvania was made on December 21, 1759, by the Rev. Thomas Barton in a letter to the Society for the Propagation of the Gospel in Foreign parts: "In the county of Berks there are a number of people of the Communion of the Church of England, who have never had an Episcopal minister among them." This situation was reiterated in 1760 by William Bird who petitioned the society for its assistance in "sending over a missionary to reside in Reading ... and to officiate also at Morlattin, a place fifteen miles distant, where a church has for many years been built by a society of English and Swedes, who are desirous of having a missionary of the Church of England, and join with us in this application." The petitioners proposed paying the requested missionary sixty pounds "Penna. money."

By 1763, a missionary was in place. The Rev. Alexander Murray wrote a report to his superiors that year stating that his English Church congregation was composed of forty-eight members from seven different families. Twelve were under the age of seven. Their church services were held in a "Dwelling-House that is hired for holding the Civil Courts," and were sometimes attended by a group of twenty Anabaptists who lived in Reading, which had roughly thirteen hundred residents at that time. The next year, his congregation had grown to one hundred and twenty-one individuals from eighteen families.

By 1765, they had named their group St. Mary's Parish, were meeting at the city's courthouse, and had begun preparations to purchase land to erect a new church building. That plot of land was located at what is now North Fifth and Walnut streets in Reading. Their officers that year were: Edward Biddle and James Diemer (wardens), and Mark Bird, George Hinton, John Patton, John Price, James Read, Jonas Seely, James Whitehead, and Peter Witherington (vestrymen).

Congregants were unable to raise the funds necessary to erect that building, and Rev. Murray was given permission by the church's executive council to sell the land. He subsequently left the congregation in 1778.

=== 1800s ===
In 1815, the name of the congregation was changed to Christ Church, and church leaders accepted the transfer of a different plot of land from Mrs. Rebecca Price with renewed hopes of erecting a new building and burial ground for their congregation. This plot was located at what is now the west side of Fifth Street, just north of Court Street.

After nine years of planning and fundraising, and now under the leadership of the Rev. Robert Davis, Christ Church was formally accepted as a member of the Episcopal Diocese of Philadelphia on May 12, 1824. That same year, church leaders began soliciting proposals from prospective builders in October 1824. Construction on the church began in the spring of 1825, and the cornerstone was dedicated before a large crowd of congregants, clergy, and city officials on June 8 of that year. Completed less than a year later, the new church building was an early English Gothic structure that was "thirty-five feet front and fifty feet deep," according to Montgomery, and had seating for three hundred worshippers. The new Christ Church was officially consecrated on May 10, 1826, with a sermon delivered by Bishop William White.

A member of the Episcopal Diocese of Central Pennsylvania during the 1880s, Reading's Christ Church became the first church in the diocese to have its own boys' choir.

Seating capacity was subsequently increased to eight hundred in 1848, and a recess chancel, transepts and spire were added in 1863 when the structure was expanded.

"The Parish Monitor," a monthly church bulletin began production in March 1870, under the leadership of the Rev. J. Pinkney Hammond, church rector.

In 1873, vestry rooms were added, as were rooms for the rector and choir, and the chancel was enlarged by sixteen feet. That same year, according to Montgomery, family members of the late Isaac Eckert, a former congregant at Christ Episcopal (then Christ Cathedral), presented church leaders with a gift of "a full chime of ten bells" in memory of Eckert, who had died on December 13, 1873. The chimes were subsequently installed in the church's Gothic spire. The bells, which were manufactured by the Meneely Bell Foundry of West Troy, New York, weighed a total of 10,109 pounds, and were operated by a system of pedals.

In 1881, the estate of former congregant Lucretia Dash Wood provided the funds necessary for church leaders to add a new parish building with classrooms and a chapel. As the church grew in size, physically, it also grew in stature, culturally, becoming the location choice for worship, marriages, funerals, and other key events in the lives of multiple, prominent members of Berks County society. Vestry member rosters during the 1880s included: Henry S. Eckert, Issaac Hiester, Richmond L. Jones, De Benneville Randolph Keim, Henry M. Keim, Jacob Knabb, the publisher and editor of the Reading Times newspaper, William R. McIlvain, Edward D. Smith, P. R. Stetson, Joseph Lybrand Stichter, a prominent merchant and civic leader who served on the boards of directors of the Reading Cotton Factory and multiple railroad lines, and who also played a key role in establishing the first telegraph line between Reading and Philadelphia, Thomas D. Stichter, W. Murray Weidman, and Henry Wiegel.

Easter services were held "on Good Friday, and every day of Passion Week" in 1881, and described as follows by the Reading Times and Dispatch:

"The rite of confirmation will be administered by Bishop Howe this (Saturday) evening, and Easter services, with communion, on Easter Sunday at 10 a.m. conducted by the Rector, Rev. Wm. P. Orrick, assisted by the Bishop.

The music to be rendered in Christ Episcopal Church will be very fine, the following programme having been arranged for the morning services by Prof. Edward A. Berg, organist of the church:

Programme of Music
1. Processional, We Are Soldiers of the Cross, Rockwell
2. Christ our Passover ... Wheat
3. Gloria Patri after proper Psalms ... Greatvox
4. Te Deum in G ... Loretz
5. Jubilate Deo in G ... Jacoby
6. Hymn No. 101 ... Jacoby
7. Kyrie ... Warren
8. Gloria Tibi ... Warren
9. Hymn No. 104
10. Offertory—Easter Anthem ... Williams
11. Trisagion ... Mendelssohn
12. Hymn No. 204
13. Gloria in Excelsis ... Tours

The choir will be: Miss Ciara Dietrich, soprano; Miss Sallie A. Shearer, soprano; Miss Lillie E. Keonig, alto; Mr. Jesse Orr, tenor; Mr. P. R. Stetson, tenor; Mr. A. S. Boyer, bass; Mr. Edw. Pengelly, basso and 10 boys and 4 men.

On Easter evening the confirmation services conducted by the Bishop, the quartet choir of Christ church will sing a new and very effective arrangement of, 'Jesus, Lover of My Soul,' by W. C. Williams.

Christ Cathedral Chimes Mr. James Harrison will ring Christ Cathedral chimes on Easter morning, beginning at 9 a.m., with the following programme:

1. Changes on 8 bells—Grandsire trebles
2. Christ hath arisen
3. Christ, the Lord, is risen again
4. Angels roll the rock away
5. Christ, the Lord, is risen to-day
6. He is risen
7. Hark! the song of Jubilee
8. Angelic songs
9. Music of Heaven
10. All Hail! the power of Jesus' name!—tune 'Coronation.'"

In June 1886, Christ Church installed a new stained glass window in memory of De Benneville Keim, the son of longtime church and vestry member De Benneville Randolph Keim.

The congregation paid tribute to its longtime rector, the Rev. Dr. William P. Orrick, for his twenty-five years of service during a special reception in the church's Wood chapel on October 3, 1898. Longtime vestryman Richmond L. Jones said the following of Orrick:

"In your many years among us, you have set an example of godly life, avoiding strife and contention, knowing no resentment, walking in the ways of virtue, morality and holiness,—a living example to those about you;—counseling without reproving, sympathizing without obtruding and commanding the respect and winning the affection of those whom God has committed to your charge."

In September 1899, the congregation paid tribute to Henry M. Keim, who had served as a vestryman from 1864 until his death in February of that year, during the unveiling of a memorial tablet on the church's south wall, next to the De Benneville Keim window that had been installed in 1886. The thirty-six-inch, Gothic-style, bronze tablet, bordered with carvings of oak leaves and acorns, was inscribed as follows:

"To the Glory of God, and in Loving Memory of Henry May Keim,
for Thirty-Five Years a Vestryman of this Church.
1864-1899.
Born August 16th, 1842.
Entered Into Rest Feb. 18, 1899.
A Faithful Friend—An Earnest Churchman. A Sincere Christian."

=== 1900s ===
Episcopal Diocese leaders joined with congregants in celebrating the seventy-fifth anniversary of Christ Episcopal Church in a special program during the evening of May 10, 1901. Directed by the church's longtime rector, the Rev. Dr. William P. Orrick, the service featured music by a seventy-four member choir conducted by the church's organist and choirmaster, Willoughby Wilde. The evening's sermon, which was delivered by Bishop Leighton Coleman of Delaware, provided an overview of the church's history and the history of the Episcopal church's growth in Pennsylvania, and paid tribute, by name, to many of the church's most famous members.

The Rev. Dr. William P. Orrick, rector of Reading's Christ Episcopal Church for more than thirty-six years, died on May 21, 1910. His funeral was held at Christ Episcopal at 2 p.m. on Tuesday, May 24, and he was subsequently buried at the Charles Evans Cemetery in Reading.

Orrick was succeeded by his assistant, the Rev. Wallace Martin, who delivered the sermon at Orrick's funeral, and then oversaw the Christ Church congregation in an interim capacity as minister in charge, and then as rector.

Martin was then succeeded by the Rev. Frederick Alexander MacMillen, a native of Prince Edward Island Canada who accepted the call of the Reading Christ Church's vestry in January 1911, and assumed his duties in Reading on the first Sunday of March that year. The date chosen for his start was symbolic because it was the start of the church's season of Lent, the Christian time of reflection upon the cycles of death and rebirth. Martin's final day at Reading's Christ Church was in mid-February 1911; he left the church to accept begin work on March 1 as rector of the Calvary Episcopal Church in Tamaqua, Pennsylvania.

Five years later, Christ Episcopal lost its longtime Sunday School superintendent, Thomas P. Merritt, who died from pneumonia on December 29, 1916. A civic leader and philanthropist, Merritt had built his fortune in the lumber industry and had also served as mayor of the city of Reading and officer on the boards of directors of the Berks County Tuberculosis Society, Hope Rescue Mission, Masonic Temple Building Trust, Mt. Penn Gravity Company, Pennsylvania Trust Company, Reading National Bank, Reading Public Library, and the Wernersville State Hospital.

In November 1927, congregants paid tribute to the Rev. Dr. William P. Orrick, during the dedication of a two-story, Romanesque structure in Orrick's memory that would serve, moving forward, as the warm-up room for the church choir prior to services. A bronze plate engraved with Orrick's likeness was placed at the room's entrance in the church's south transept.

In 1935, MacMillen was elected as vice president of the Reading Ministerial Association. He retired from his position at rector of Christ Episcopal on October 1, 1946. A frequent guest preacher at Episcopalian churches in the region, he died at the age of 102 in his room at the Berkshire Hotel in Reading on Wednesday March 25, 1970.

== Church rectors ==
Church leaders during the 1800s were:

- The Rev. Robert Davis (1823-1824)
- The Rev. W. C. Mead (1826)
- The Rev. H. J. Whitehouse (1827-1828)
- The Rev. M. Leonard (1829)
- The Rev. J. H. Cummings (1830-1831)
- The Rev. S. A. McCoskry (1832-1833)
- The Rev. G. W. Cole (1834)
- The Rev. R. U. Morgan, D.D. (1834-1850)
- The Rev. M. C. Lightner (1850-1861)
- The Rev. A. G. Cummins (1861-1867)
- The Rev. J. P. Lundy, D.D. (1867-1869)
- The Rev. J. P. Hammond (1869-1872)
- The Rt. Rev. M. A. De W. Howe, D.D. (Oct. 7, 1872)
- The Rev. William Pendleton Orrick, D.D. (Oct. 1, 1873-May 21, 1910)
- The Rev. Wallace Martin (1910-1911)
- The Rev. Frederick Alexander MacMillen (March 1911-October 1, 1946)
