= Paxton Creek =

Stream in Pennsylvania, United States

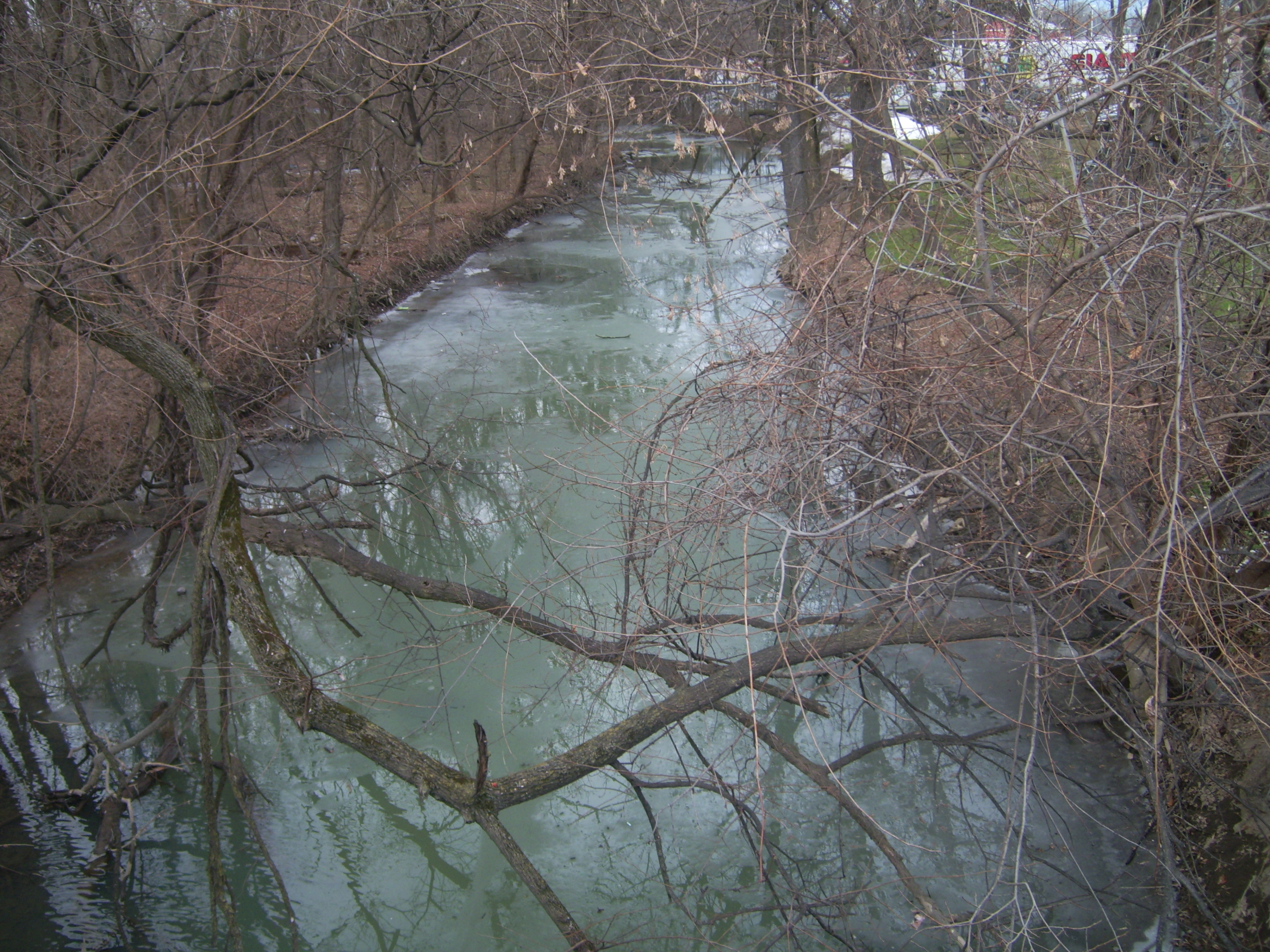
- View of Paxton Creek from Maclay Street in Harrisburg, Pennsylvania, near the Pennsylvania Farm Show

- Location of the mouth of Paxton Creek in Pennsylvania

Location
- Country: United States
- State: Pennsylvania
- County: Dauphin

Physical characteristics
- Source
  - location: Linglestown, Dauphin County, Pennsylvania
  - coordinates: 40°21′29″N 76°48′9″W
  - elevation: 1,220 ft (370 m)
- Mouth: Susquehanna River
  - location: Harrisburg, Dauphin County, Pennsylvania
  - coordinates: 40°14′35″N 76°51′50″W
  - elevation: 292 ft (89 m)
- Length: 13.9 mi (22.4 km)
- Basin size: 27.4 sq mi (71 km^{2})

Basin features
- Tributaries
  - left: Black Run (Paxton Creek)
  - right: Asylum Run

Paxton Creek is a 13.9-mile-long (22.4 km) tributary of the Susquehanna River in Dauphin County, Pennsylvania, in the United States.

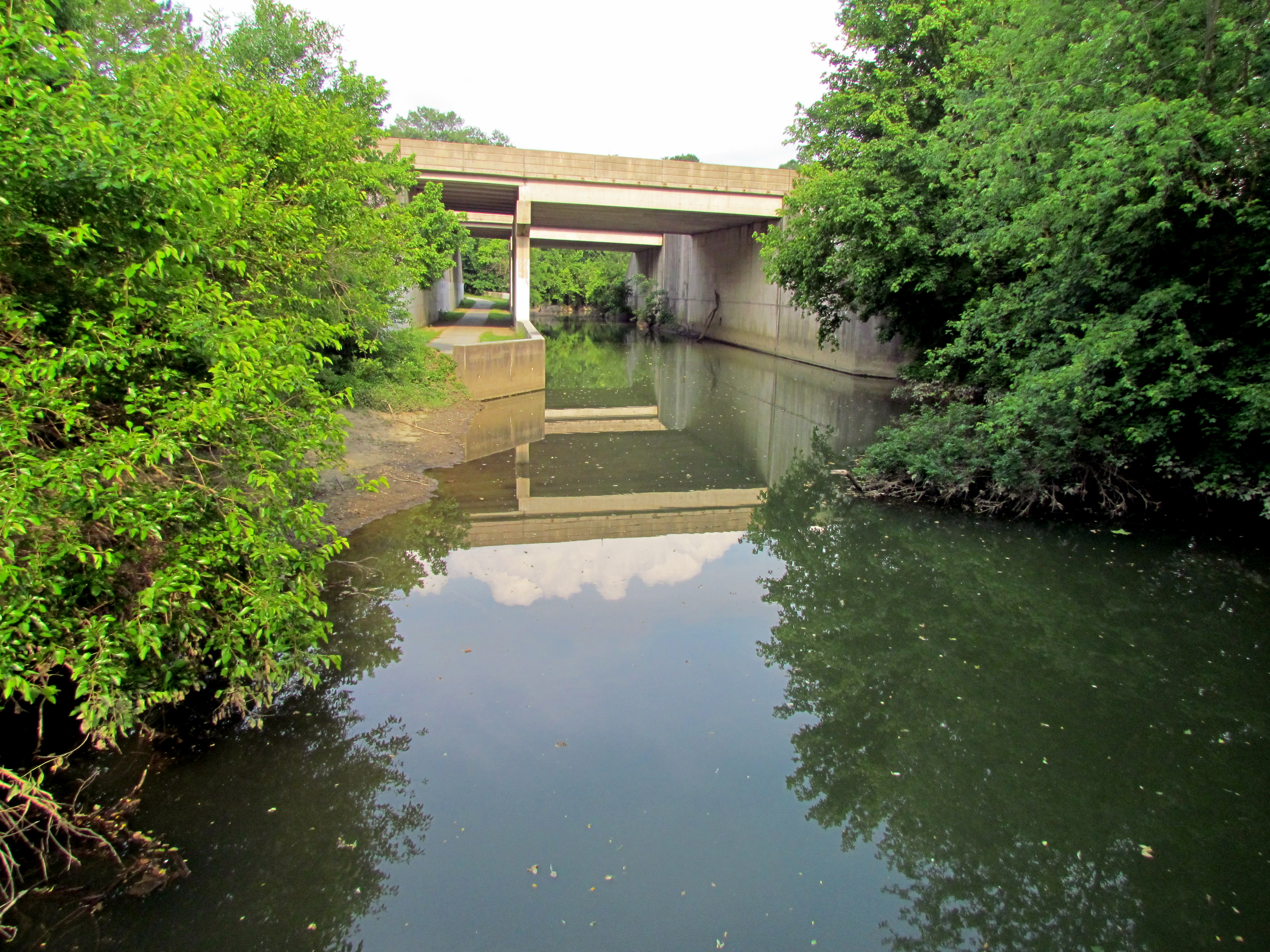
Paxton Creek flowing under U.S. Route 22 in Wildwood Park

The Paxton Creek watershed covers an area of 27.4 square miles (71 km^{2}) and joins the Susquehanna River at South Harrisburg, Harrisburg.

The name Paxton, or Paxtang, is derived the Susquehannock term "Peshtank", meaning "where the waters stand" or "the place of springs". It is born from two branches on the southern slopes of Blue Mountain to form the main stem in Lower Paxton Township. It then forms Wildwood Lake in Susquehanna Township, artificially formed in 1908 by damming the creek for recreational activities. Later, it extends downstream approximately 6.2 miles to Harrisburg as a concrete channel built in 1914 (against the wishes of Warren Manning) to mitigate urban runoff and flooding, which is common after severe storms. This urban stream section of the confluence has been subject to planned restoration efforts, with a 2018 study published by PennDOT stating a goal aiming to "restore the creek’s ecosystem and improve its functions and services" by reversing the negative effects of the concrete channel and its degradation.

Where the stream passes through the city it receives the discharges from several large sewers, which, during dry weather, pollute the water and foul the shores and bottom of the creek to a very objectionable extent.

— Warren Manning, Proposed Municipal Improvements for Harrisburg, PA, 1901

== Tributaries ==
- Asylum Run
- Black Run

== See also ==
- List of rivers of Pennsylvania
- List of rivers of the United States
