= Paxtang Park =

Trailhead area in Pennsylvania, US

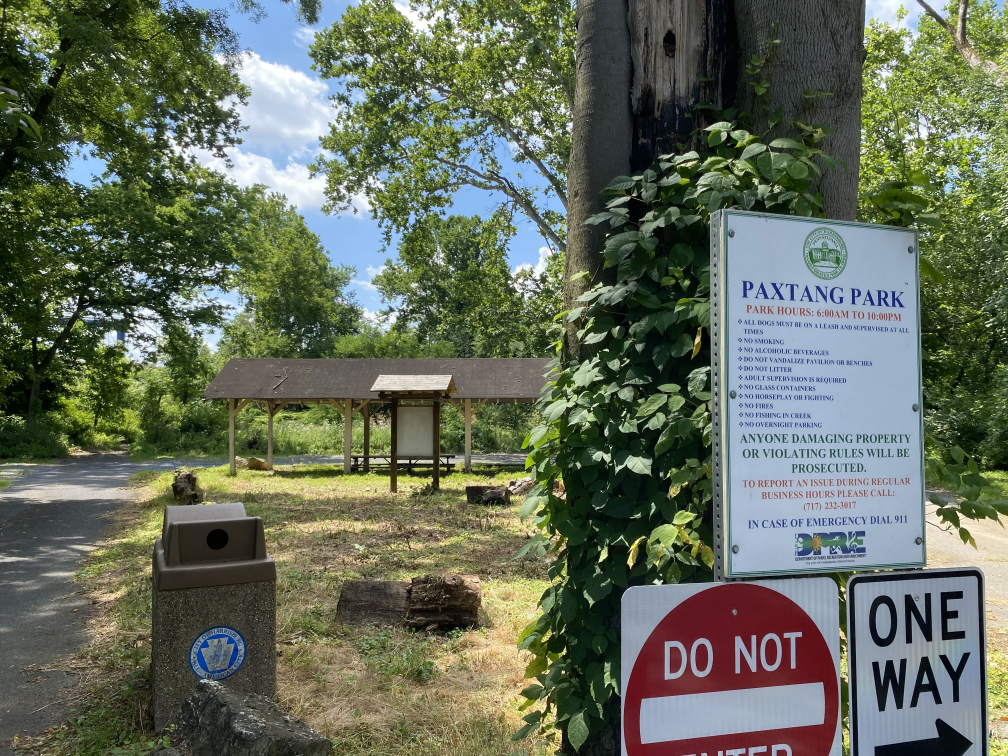
- Entrance to the trailhead as seen in July 2024
- Interactive map of Paxtang Park
- Location: 147 City Park Dr, Harrisburg, Pennsylvania
- Coordinates: 40.2562°N 76.8320°W
- Area: 40 acres (16 ha)
- Established: 1823 (trolley park), 2020 (hiking park)

Paxtang Park is a hiking and mountain biking park in East Harrisburg, Pennsylvania and Paxtang, Pennsylvania. It is a part of the Capital Area Greenbelt. It was formerly a 40-acre (160,000 m^{2}) trolley park. It existed as a trolley park from 1823 to 1929, and reopened as a hiking park in 2020. The trolley park contained two roller coasters, Coaster Flyer and Jack Rabbit.

== History ==
=== "Old" Paxtang Park - 1893-1922 ===
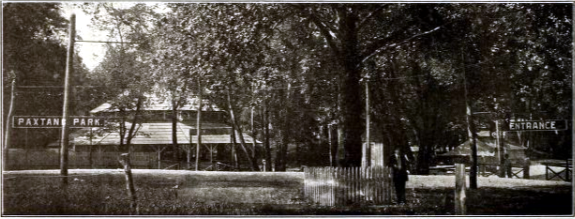
Entrance to Paxtang Park in 1909

Paxtang Park was leased to the East Harrisburg Street Electric Railway Company from the Rutherford Estate on July 19, 1893, initially for a ten-year term. Plans included constructing a fence surrounding the property (though the park would retain its free entry policy), a pavilion with a capacity of several hundred people, benches, and a "gravity railroad" (scenic railway). The only one of these planned additions which was not constructed was the gravity railroad. It wasn't until 1905 that the park added its first roller coaster, Coaster Flyer. This was a figure 8 roller coaster, and it operated from 1905 to 1922. The owners did not build a dancing pavilion, and they banned the sale of liquor to avoid "undesirable patronage".

=== "New" Paxtang Park - 1923-1929 ===
In 1922, the railroad company announced they would not renew the lease on the grounds of Paxtang Park for a fourth lease after having renewed it twice in 1903 and 1913. They were no longer able to afford the costs of operating the park, so they announced 1922 would be the final season of Paxtang Park. However, in August, Kerstetter Amusement Company of Newark, New Jersey obtained new ownership of the lease from the railroad company. Owner Thomas Kerstetter pledged many improvements to the park, including an additional roller coaster, an airplane swing, a carousel, a new Ferris wheel, and a dancing pavilion. Kerstetter intended to turn the park into a true amusement park destination.

The park had some success, but by the late 1920s, it struggled to open before the Fourth of July, when in past years it opened before Memorial Day. The owners were missing tax payments. 1929 was its final season and by 1930, Steelton Bank and Trust took control of the property, and sold off the amusements and other items.

== Reopening ==
Beginning in 2017, the Susquehanna Area Mountain Bike Association (SAMBA) announced plans to restore the park as a trailhead and picnic area, connecting to the Capital Area Greenbelt. Ten miles of trails used for hiking and mountain biking are currently located on the Capital Area Greenbelt and maintained by SAMBA. Paxtang Park was formally reopened in September 2020.

== See also ==
- Capital Area Greenbelt
