= Amos R. Boughter =

American politician

Member of the Pennsylvania Senate from the 15th district
- In office 1861–1863
- Preceded by: John Brisban Rutherford
- Succeeded by: David Fleming

Personal details
- Born: March 4, 1824 Boiling Springs, Pennsylvania
- Died: March 2, 1879 (age 53) Lebanon, Pennsylvania
- Party: Republican
- Spouse: Amelia née Rauguel
- Children: 4
- Occupation: Lawyer

Amos R. Boughter was an American politician who served in the Pennsylvania State Senate for the 15th district from 1861 to 1863.

== Biography ==
Boughter was born on March 4, 1824, in Boiling Springs before moving to Lebanon at a young age. He worked as a captain on a ship on the Union Canal before studying law under General John Weidman, being admitted to the Lebanon County bar in 1851.

He was an unsuccessful candidate for United States Congress in the 1854 election before being elected to the Lebanon City council. In 1861 he was elected to the 15th district of the Pennsylvania State Senate as a Republican.

Boughter was a veteran of the American Civil War, volunteering for the Pennsylvania Emergency Militia. He served as the captain of Company K.

After being mustered out of service he chose to return to his law practice instead of returning to politics. Boughter died of a heart attack on March 2, 1879, at the age of 53, and is buried at the Mount Lebanon Cemetery.

== Personal life ==
Boughter was married to Amelia Née Rauguel and had three sons, John, Edward and Francis, and a daughter, Katherine. Boughter was a member of the Independent Order of Odd Fellows lodge No. 121 and was an Ancient York Mason of lodge No. 226.
