= Asylum Run =

Stream in Pennsylvania, United States

Coordinates: 40°16′51″N 76°52′59″W

Asylum Run is a 4.2-mile-long (6.8 km) tributary of Paxton Creek in Dauphin County, Pennsylvania, in the United States.

Asylum Run joins Paxton Creek at the north-easternmost border of Harrisburg at the Pennsylvania Farm Show Complex & Expo Center.

It is a tributary with flashy flows, meaning the water levels can vary greatly with storm events, due to rapid runoff upstream from massive amounts of impervious surfaces in Colonial Park, Penbrook, and adjacent areas.

== See also ==
- List of rivers of Pennsylvania
