= Home of the Friendless (Baltimore, Maryland) =

Historic orphanage building in Maryland, USA

- U.S. National Register of Historic Places
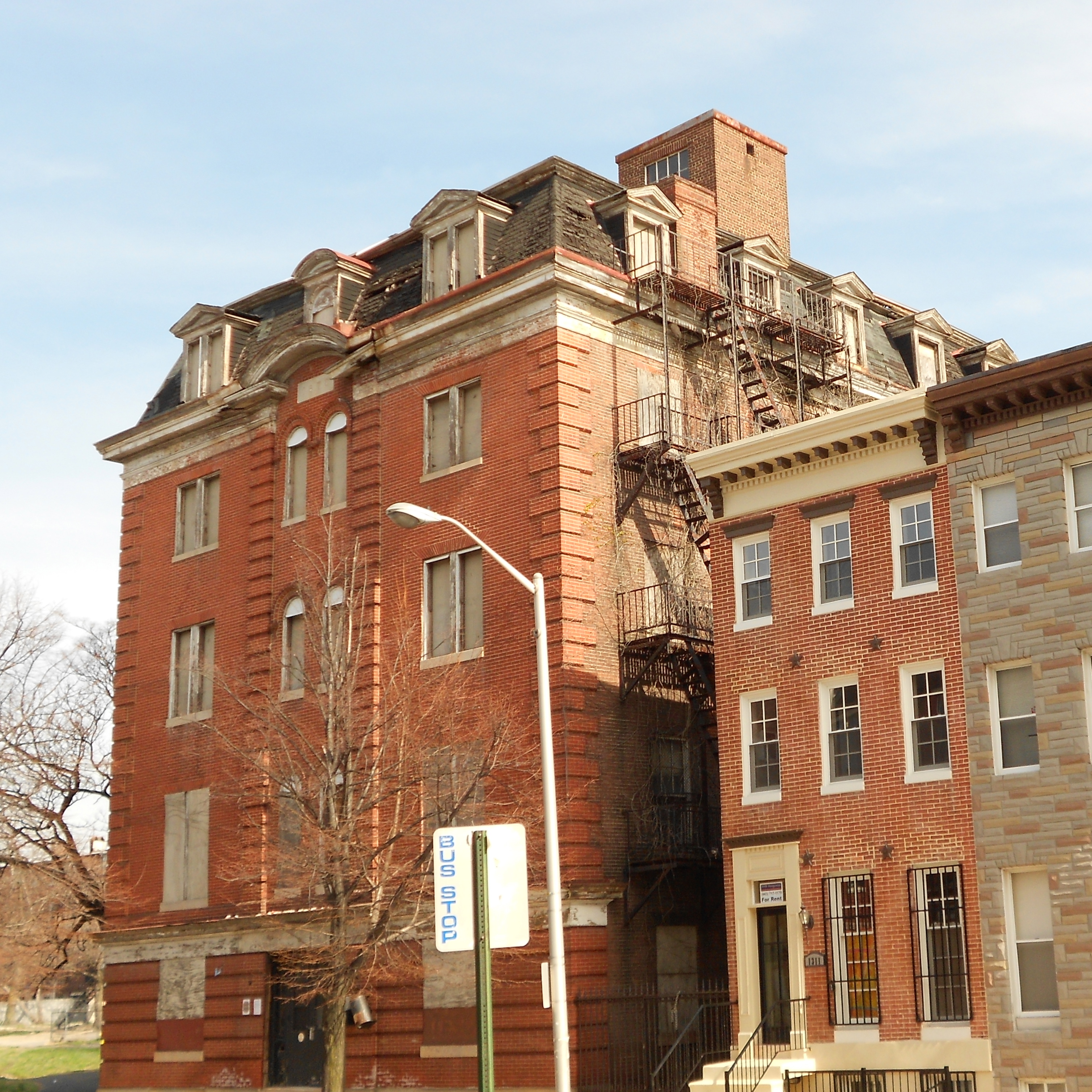
- Home of the Friendless, March 2012

- Location within Baltimore Location within Maryland Location within the United States
- Location: 1313 Druid Hill Ave., Baltimore, Maryland
- Coordinates: 39°18′8″N 76°37′45″W
- Area: 0.2 acres (0.081 ha)
- Built: 1870
- Architect: Ortwine, William
- Architectural style: Second Empire
- NRHP reference No.: 03001205
- Added to NRHP: November 8, 2003

Home of the Friendless is a historic building in Baltimore, Maryland, United States. It is a three bay wide, five story high Second Empire style brick building constructed in 1870 as an orphanage. The building provided a home for orphaned and deserted children for six decades and was part of a three-building complex that housed from 100 to 200 children each year.

In 1922 the Board of Managers and Trustees sold the property and relocated to the suburbs. By 2003, the institution had merged into the Woodbourne Center, later known as Nexus-Woodbourne Family Healing.

The Home was added to the National Register of Historic Places in 2003.
