= John Brisban Rutherford =

American politician

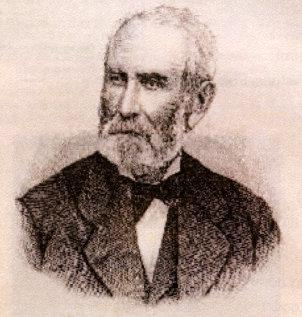
- Rutherford c.1858

Member of the Pennsylvania Senate from the 15th district
- In office 1858–1860
- Preceded by: John M. Cresswell Jr.
- Succeeded by: Amos R. Boughter

Member of the Pennsylvania House of Representatives from Dauphin county
- In office 1849–1850

Personal details
- Born: November 28, 1805 Paxton, Swatara Township, Pennsylvania
- Died: October 10, 1892 (aged 86) Paxton, Swatara Township, Pennsylvania
- Party: Whig (before 1850); Republican (after 1858)
- Spouse: Keziah née Parke
- Children: 3
- Occupation: Cavalry officer

John Brisban Rutherford was an American politician who served in the Pennsylvania State Senate and the Pennsylvania House of Representatives.

== Biography ==
Rutherford was born in Swatara Township on November 28, 1805, to Samuel and Elizabeth Rutherford in the settlement of Paxton although, his estate is now part of Harrisburg. Rutherford worked for the First National Bank of Hummelstown before inheriting his family farm in 1833 and then being elected the captain of the 98th Pennsylvania Militia Regiment in 1835, better known as the Dauphin Cavalry. He was elected to the Pennsylvania House of Representatives as a Whig in 1848, and won re-election in 1849. Rutherford would be elected to the Pennsylvania State Senate as a Republican from 1858 to 1860. After retiring from politics he served as the treasurer of the Pennsylvania State Agricultural Society. Rutherford died on October 10, 1892, in Paxton and is buried in the Paxton Presbyterian Churchyard.

== Personal life ==
John Brisban Rutherford was married to Keziah née Parke and the couple had three kids: Jennie Rutherford Dickey, Samuel Parke Rutherford, and K. Virginia Rutherford.
