= Capital Area Greenbelt =

Trail in Harrisburg, Pennsylvania, US

Coordinates: 40.28317°N 76.87196°W

- Length: 20 mi (32 km)
- Location: Dauphin County, Pennsylvania, U.S.
- Use: Hiking, biking, cross country skiing and fishing
- Grade: up to 10%
- Difficulty: Easy to Moderate
- Season: Dawn to dusk, year-round
- Sights: Susquehanna River, Blue Ridge Mountains, and local parks and attractions
- Hazards: Traffic (at road crossings)
- Surface: Asphalt, concrete, crushed stone
- Website: http://caga.org/
Trail map

The Capital Area Greenbelt is a looping trail located in the area of Harrisburg, Pennsylvania. This 20-mile loop around Pennsylvania's capital city provides visitors and tourists with opportunities to hike, ride bicycles, skate, jog, fish, walk their dogs, spot rare birds, learn about history, enjoy native flora and fauna, and appreciate nature. While parts of the trail are shared with roads, most of the loop is a dedicated path. The Trail, as it is commonly referred to by locals, passes along the Susquehanna River through Reservoir Park, Riverfront Park, Five Senses Garden, and Wildwood Park and Nature Center. In addition to parks, the Capital Area Greenbelt passes alongside attractions including the grave site of John Harris Sr. (the namesake of the city of Harrisburg), the Governor's Mansion, Fort Hunter, Harrisburg State Hospital, and the National Civil War Museum.

== Historical development ==
=== Historical significance ===
In the early 1900s, many thought Harrisburg to be an unpleasant place to live. Many of the roads were unpaved, the lack of a garbage collection service caused trash to pile up along the sides of the river, and the sewer systems dumped waste directly into the Susquehanna River. Water from the river was being used as tap water at the time, resulting in a number of cases of typhoid.

Mira Lloyd Dock, a botanist who was born in Harrisburg, had just returned from Europe with a new vision for how the city could be improved. To implement her vision, she hired landscape architect Warren Manning to develop the city's parks. Manning then recommended creating a ring boulevard encircling the city to connect its parks, which were the beginnings of what would become the Greenbelt. In the first two decades after the project was started, there was immense support and progress. Some early development included a carriage road along Parkway Creek (also called Paxtang Tributary), a tributary to Spring Creek in Paxtang. However, by the 1920s, the project was abandoned and never fully realized, partly because of the migration of city residents to the suburbs which devastated the city budget. Although most of the parkway was closed, causing it to fall into disuse and disrepair, some sections became parkways for cars. Another part of the trail, constituting less than one mile, was occupied by railroad tracks for the South Harrisburg Steel Mill.

=== Trail's history and evolution ===
The Capital Area Greenbelt Association (CAGA) was founded in 1990 to restore completed sections of the green-way. The city of Harrisburg, Pennsylvania and four surrounding townships and boroughs worked with CAGA to develop and enhance the trail. Significant grants obtained throughout the 1990s allowed the 20-mile loop to be almost fully completed. Today, the association continues to improve the trail through new safety measures and maintenance. Donation money and dedicated volunteers provide the majority of support for the association.

== Trail development ==
=== Design and construction ===
About 60% of the originally designed parkway was constructed according to the primary plan. When CAGA reclaimed the trail, unfinished sections in South Harrisburg were first constructed by volunteers as a dirt trail. Other portions were constructed using grass and woodchips, but have recently been converted to a surface of crushed limestone. The Greenbelt has several bridges over creeks and streams. The trail is ADA accessible with the exception of a few pedestrian crossings that lack curb cuts.

=== Trail amenities ===
Many amenities are available on and just off the trail. There is access to the trail at several popular spots where ample parking is available. These spots include City Island, the Five Senses Garden, and the campus of Harrisburg Area Community College (HACC). Restroom facilities are available in many locations just off the trail at local businesses and restaurants. Picnic areas are available at many parks along the trail including the Five Senses Garden and the Wildwood Lake Sanctuary. There are approximately ten kiosks located throughout the trail that provide users with current and historical information. Water fountains are located along the riverfront area. Garbage is generally "carry-in, carry-out," however there are limited receptacles along the trail. Most of the trail has mile markers.

=== Mountain Bike Trails ===
On October 29, 2016, the Parkway Trail System of mountain bike trails was officially opened. All the trails start and end off of the Capital Area Greenbelt. The three primary areas for the mountain bike trails are Cameron Parkway, Dock Woods, and Paxtang Parkway. The trails have varying levels of difficulty and are rated on the green, blue and black system. There are currently 7 miles of trails which will be expanded to 10 miles over time.

== Community ==
=== Trail supporters ===
The trail is supported by the Capital Area Greenbelt Association (CAGA). CAGA is an all-volunteer, non-profit 501(c)(3) charitable corporation. It was created to act as a liaison between all concerned parties, with the aim of organizing and planning the continued stewardship of the Capital Area Greenbelt trail. The trail is not owned by CAGA, but rather by five municipalities and Dauphin County. The five municipalities include: the city of Harrisburg, Swatara Township, Paxtang Borough, Penbrook Borough, and Susquehanna Township. The trail also passes through three parcels of land in South Harrisburg that are privately owned. In addition, the following local and community organizations are also supporters of the trail:

- Pennsylvania Department of Transportation
- Pennsylvania Department of Conservation and Natural Resources
- Pennsylvania Game Commission
- Pennsylvania Department of General Services
- Pennsylvania Department of Agriculture
- Harrisburg Area Community College

=== Special events ===
Every summer, the Capital Area Greenbelt Association hosts their main event, the "Tour de Belt." The event consists of a 20-mile bike tour passing a number of sites in Harrisburg area. It is the largest fundraiser for the Greenbelt. CAGA also organizes a Butterfly Release each year, in conjunction with the Hospice of Central Pennsylvania.

- Tour de Belt

== See also ==
- Riverfront Park
- Wildwood Park
- List of Harrisburg neighborhoods
