= Black Run (Paxton Creek tributary) =

Tributary of Paxton Creek in Dauphin County, Pennsylvania

Coordinates: 40°18′25″N 76°52′13″W

Black Run is a 3.9-mile-long (6.3 km) tributary of Paxton Creek in Dauphin County, Pennsylvania, in the United States.

Black Run begins in upper Susquehanna Township and joins Paxton Creek 6.3 miles (10.1 km) from the Susquehanna at Harrisburg.

== See also ==
- List of rivers of Pennsylvania
