= Reservoir Park (Pennsylvania) =

Park in Pennsylvania, United States

Coordinates: 40.2727°N 76.8570°W

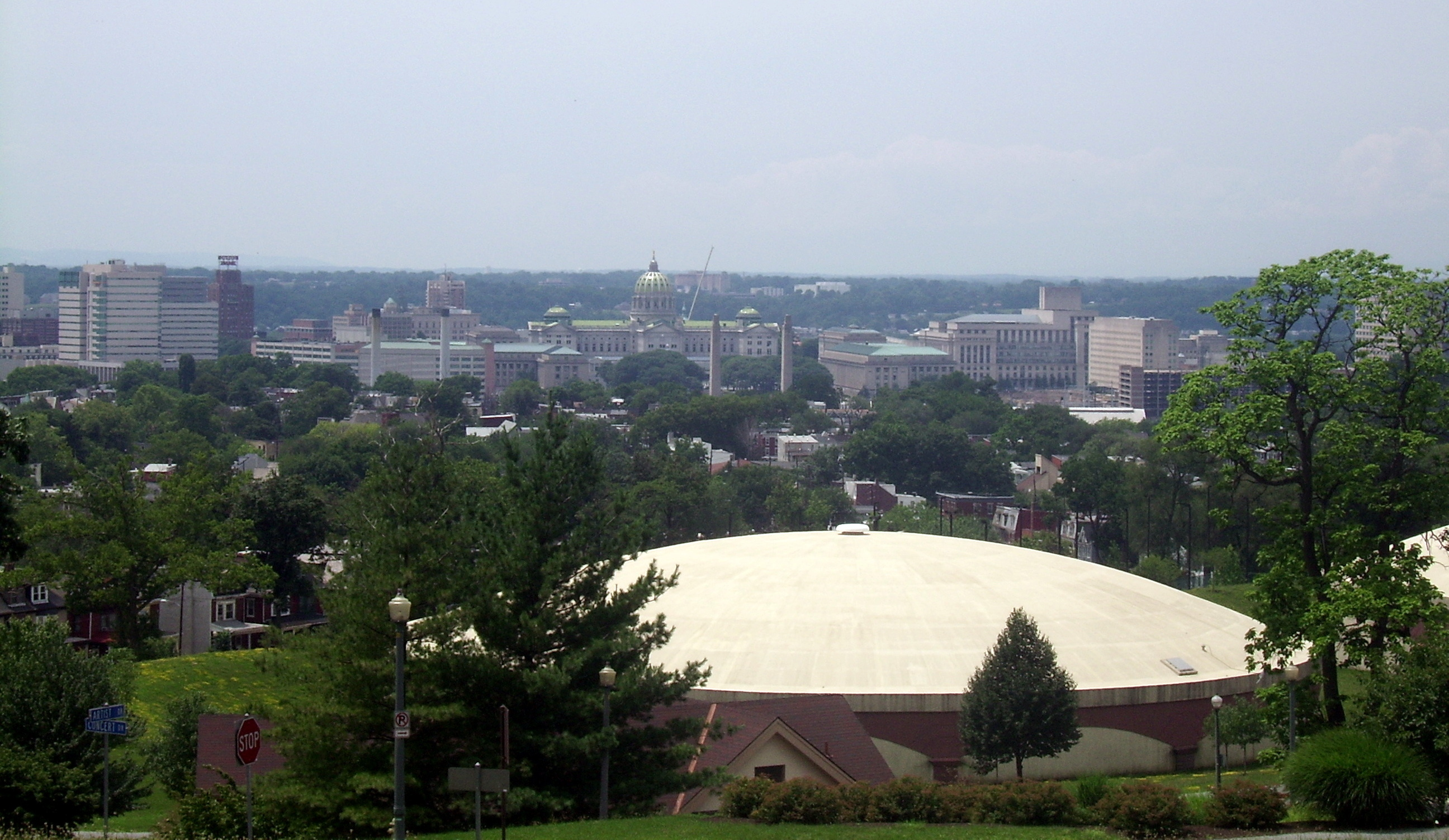
- Skyline and reservoir seen from the park
- Interactive map of Reservoir Park
- Location: Harrisburg, Pennsylvania
- Area: 85 acres (34 ha)
- Established: 1845
- Designer: Warren H. Manning

Reservoir Park is the oldest and largest municipal public park in Harrisburg, Pennsylvania, and occupies approximately 85 acres (340,000 m^{2}) in the Allison Hill neighborhood of the city. Reservoir Park is also home to the National Civil War Museum and provides the setting for many of Harrisburg's most popular outdoor festivals and performances. The park is part of the Capital Area Greenbelt, a 20-mile (32 km) greenway surrounding portions of the city.

== History ==
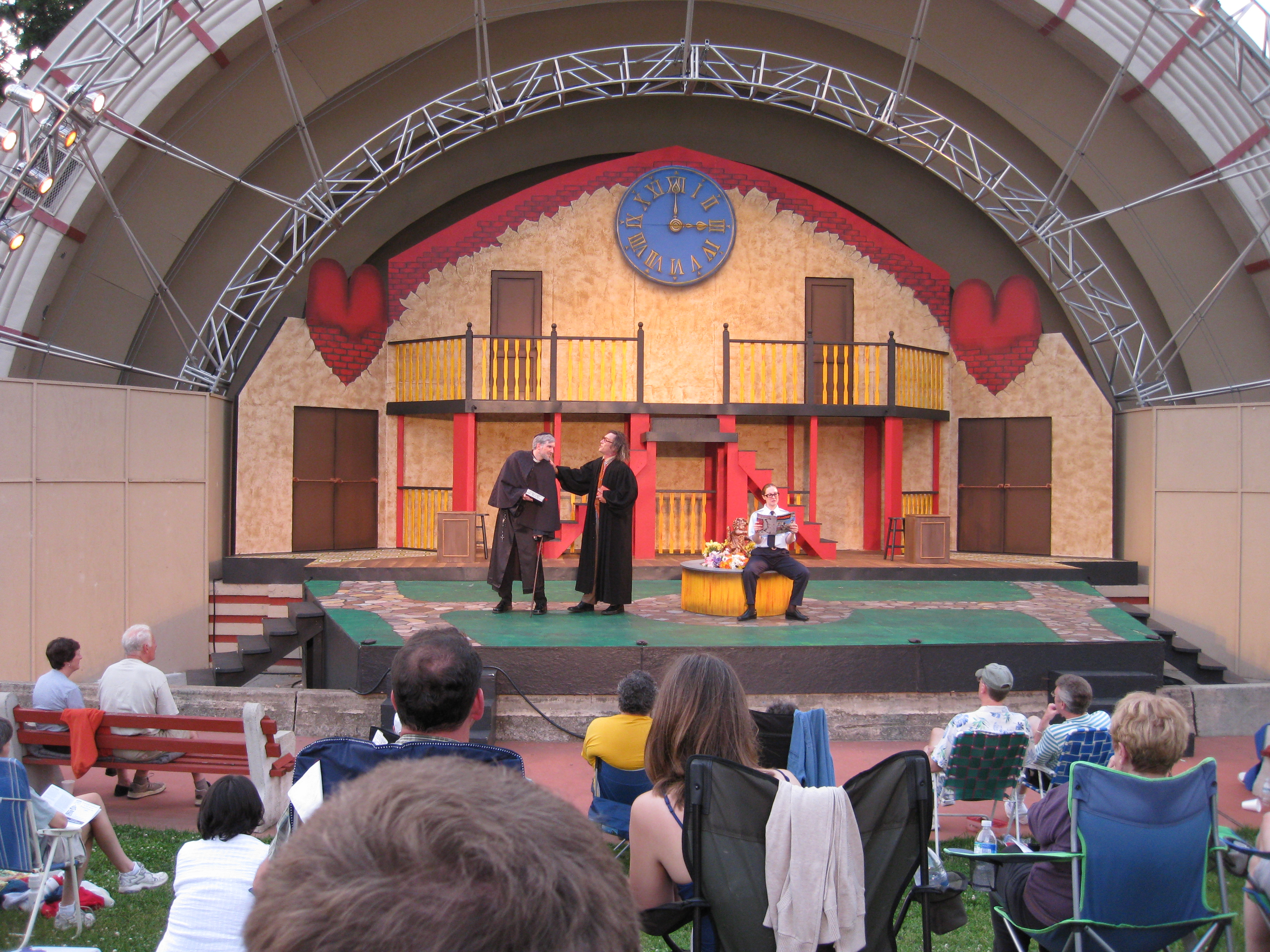
Shakespeare in the Park at Reservoir Park

The original portion of the park dates to 1845. In 1872, a reservoir for the City of Harrisburg was built in an undeveloped area outside the city limits, then called Prospect Hill (now Allison Hill). City leaders recognized the spot as a wonderful vantage point to view the State Capitol, the Susquehanna River valley and the Blue Mountains and, in 1890, officially established the area around the reservoir as a park. The park is the highest point in the city. It contains one underground thirty million gallon reservoir, and two 6 million gallon above ground reservoirs, which gravity-feed freshwater to the city's water system.

== See also ==
- List of Harrisburg neighborhoods
