= National Civil War Museum =

American Civil War museum

- Established: 2001
- Location: Reservoir Park, Harrisburg, Pennsylvania, US
- Coordinates: 40.2720°N 76.8553°W
- Type: History museum
- Collections: American Civil War-era artifacts, manuscripts, documents, and photographs
- Collection size: 25,400
- CEO: Wayne E. Motts
- Chairperson: G. Lee Miller
- Curator: Brett Kelley
- Employees: 5
- Public transit access: Market St opp. Briarcliff Rd, CAT
- Parking: On site (no charge)
- Website: nationalcivilwarmuseum.org

The National Civil War Museum, located at One Lincoln Circle at Reservoir Park in Harrisburg, Pennsylvania, is a private 501c(3) nonprofit promoting the preservation of material culture and sources of information that are directly relevant to the American Civil War and the postwar period as related to veterans' service organizations, including the Grand Army of the Republic and the United Confederate Veterans. The museum serves as the National Headquarters for the Sons of Union Veterans of the Civil War (SUVCW).

== History ==
Former Harrisburg mayor Stephen R. Reed supported the museum's development, which cost $32 million. The museum is privately owned and opened to the public in 2001. In 2015, the museum published a book about U.S. General Joshua Lawrence Chamberlain. In 2009, the museum affiliated with the Smithsonian Institution.

== Location ==
The museum is located in a two-story brick building in Harrisburg's Reservoir Park in the Allison Hill neighborhood. The exhibits and self-guided tour begin on the museum's second floor (first ten galleries) and continue on the first floor (last seven galleries and theater). A gift shop, temporary exhibit gallery, and museum support are on the first floor. A "Walk of Valor" consisting of red bricks bearing the names of Civil War veterans contributes to the museum's memorial-like grounds.

== Exhibits ==
The museum's exhibits are designed to "inspire lifelong learning of the American Civil War through the preservation and balanced presentation of the American peoples' struggles for survival and healing". The exhibition covers from 1850 to 1876, focusing on the Civil War years of 1861 to 1865. The City of Harrisburg acquired most of the over 24,000 artifacts, photographs, documents, manuscripts, and other printed matter between 1994 and 1999. Three-dimensional objects (artifacts) comprise about 3,500 items, of which one-fourth (850 items) are on display in the permanent galleries of the building. The balance is held in secure storage for future exhibits and scholarly research, reserved for Museum members and by appointment only.

The museum's galleries are as follows:

1. A House Divided, 1850–1860 (examines the events leading up to the Civil War); Highlights a speech Abraham Lincoln gave in Washington D.C. in 1860, in which he claimed that a house divided could not stand.
2. American Slavery: The Peculiar Institution, 1850–1860 (how nineteenth-century Americans saw slavery);
3. First Shots, April 1861 (Fort Sumter); The first battle and start of the war
4. Making of Armies (recruiting, training, and equipping both armies);
5. Weapons and Equipment (with many artifacts); Disease continued to cause most war deaths, but conscription and massive armies, more powerful and accurate weapons, and civilian targets increased casualties in the mid-1800 conflicts and later wars.
6. Campaigns and Battles of 1861–1862 (early campaigns and the tactics, strategies. and logistics);
7. Battle Map, 1861–1862 (emphasis on how geography and topography affected troop movements);
8. Camp Curtin (the Civil War's largest Union camp, located in Harrisburg);
9. Why Men Fought, 1861–1863 (motivations of soldiers on both sides);
10. Civil War Music (displays of musical instruments and recorded music to listen to);
11. Gettysburg, 1863 (a turning point of the American Civil War); Total casualties of nearly 50,000 men made it the largest battle ever on North American soil
12. Women in the War (women's various roles);
13. Navy (focuses on maritime engagements);
14. Campaigns and Battles of 1864–1865 (the last years of the Civil War);
15. Battle Map, 1863–1865 (from Stones River to Appomattox);
16. Lincoln: War & Remembrance (remembering the Civil War, Lincoln, and veterans' roles after the war)

A video, We the People, focuses on ten characters from all walks of life and their fates before, during, and after the war. It is presented in segments in galleries 1, 4, 9, and 14 and concludes in the theater.

== Artifacts ==
The museum contains many original artifacts, including weapons, uniforms, camp and personal effects, and similar items. Among the many articles on display are:

- The portable writing kit of Winfield Scott
- 1852 Sharps carbine and a pike head from the raid on Harper's Ferry
- The last battle map used by Robert E. Lee during the Appomattox campaign
- The pen used by Henry A. Wise to sign John Brown's death warrant
- Lincoln's leather hat box used on the 1860 (first term) campaign trail
- Two of three known sabers of J. E. B. Stuart's, including one presented by his cousin on Stuart's wedding
- A sleeve of George Pickett, removed from his coat after he was wounded at the Battle of Gaines' Mill; traces of blood are visible
- Shadow box of relics once in possession of Stonewall Jackson, including hair from his horse, "Little Sorell", wood from his chair, and cloth from his desk
- George B. McClellan's saddle, used when he was General-In-Chief of the U.S. Army
- Robert E. Lee's hat cord and Bible, inscribed in his hand, used for almost 20 years until its capture four days before Lee's surrender at Appomattox
- A sword belt presented to Ulysses S. Grant to commemorate the capture of Vicksburg
- A gauntlet worn by Stonewall Jackson earlier in the war
- A Bowie knife captured from one of "Mosby's Rangers"
- Doeskin riding gauntlets belonging to Lee
- A chair from the captured White House of the Confederacy
- Kepi belonging to George Pickett
- A lock of hair belonging to and a post-war painting of George Pickett passed down through his family
- A bullet-ridden fence post from along Harrisburg Road in Gettysburg
- Various other rifles, revolvers, officer's swords, and munitions later discovered on battlefields
- Rare chains, iron shackles, and bracelets from the slave trade, including a slave collar with remnants of the original linen interior lining
- A wooden saddle and tack box used by Grant
- Memorabilia from Civil War veterans' reunions
- A collection of memorabilia from Lincoln's assassination, including a lock of Lincoln's hair, a sash from the funeral train, (the original) telegram ordering the arrest of John Wilkes Booth, a ticket to that night's production of Our American Cousin at Ford's Theatre, a replica of his "life mask", and a fragment of Mary Todd Lincoln's dress that she wore the night of the assassination
- The key to Libby Prison, a prison used for Federal officers
- Lead bullets, complete with teeth marks, given to patients in anticipation of pain during surgery
- Stateroom plaque inscribed "D.G. Farragut, USN" carried by him from stateroom to stateroom during his naval career
- A Lincoln administration china plate and a lantern from Lincoln's home in Springfield, Illinois

== See also ==
- American Civil War Museum
- National Civil War Naval Museum
- African American Civil War Memorial Museum
- National Museum of Civil War Medicine
- Gettysburg Museum and Visitor Center
- New England Civil War Museum
- The National Civil War Battles of the Western Theater Museum
