= Paxtang, Pennsylvania =

Borough in Pennsylvania, US

Paxtang, Pennsylvania Peshtank, Paxton
- Borough
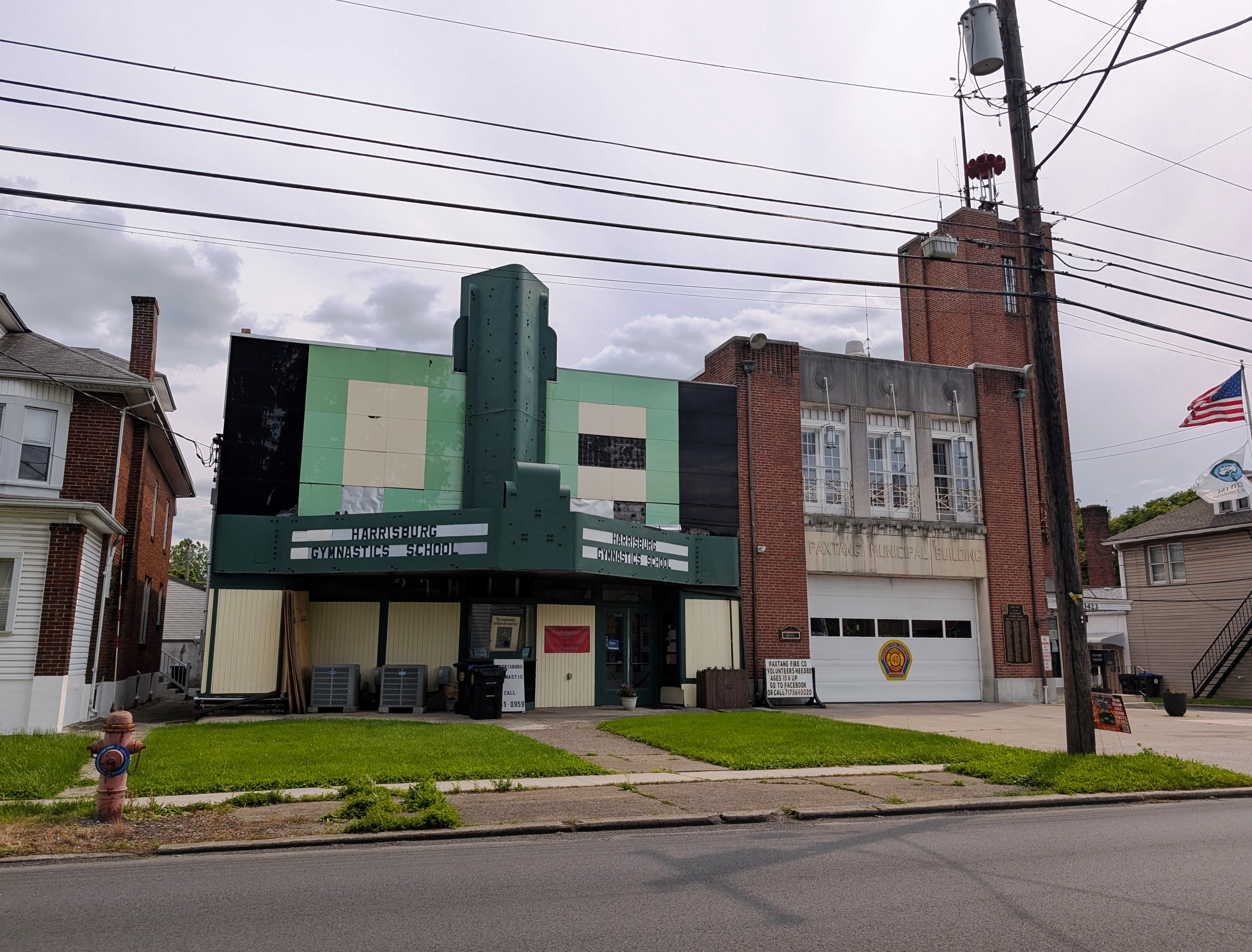
- Paxtang Municipal Building and former theater, June 2025

- Seal

- Location in Dauphin County and the U.S. state of Pennsylvania.

- Location in Pennsylvania and the United States Paxtang (the United States)
- Coordinates: 40°15′39″N 76°50′02″W
- Country: United States
- State: Pennsylvania
- County: Dauphin
- Settled: 1722
- Incorporated: 1914

Government
  - Type: Borough Council

Area
  - Total: 0.41 sq mi (1.05 km^{2})
  - Land: 0.41 sq mi (1.05 km^{2})
  - Water: 0 sq mi (0.00 km^{2})
- Elevation: 371 ft (113 m)

Population (2020)
  - Total: 1,648
  - Density: 4,060.7/sq mi (1,567.86/km^{2})
- Time zone: UTC-5 (Eastern (EST))
  - Summer (DST): UTC-4 (EDT)
- ZIP code: 17111
- Area code: 717
- FIPS code: 42-58504
- Website: www.paxtang.org

Paxtang is a borough in Dauphin County, Pennsylvania, United States. As of the 2020 census it had a population of 1,640. The borough is a suburb of Harrisburg and is one of the earliest colonial settlements in South Central Pennsylvania.

== History ==
Paxtang dates to the 18th century when Euro-Americans settled at the site of the Shawnee-Lenape village of Peshtank. The Lenape called the village Peshtank meaning "where the waters stand" which in English became Paxtang or Paxton. Several important trails and routes developed in the area as the Susquehanna River was easily forded here, making Paxtang an ideal location for the movement of people and trade goods across the river.

In 1700, William Penn, founder of the Province of Pennsylvania, obtained from the Susquehannock a deed for their lands in the Susquehanna Valley. This was confirmed by treaty in 1701. In October 1714, French fur trader Peter Bisaillon was granted 250 acres of land "at Peshtang or any other Indian Town or Place on Sasquehannah within this Province," with permission to build any necessary buildings "during his Trade there or till further."

Paxtang is the site where Presbyterian Scotch-Irish frontiersmen organized the Paxton Boys, a vigilante group formed to protect Europeans from Indian attacks during Pontiac's War that killed twenty Susquehannock in the Conestoga Massacre. On December 14, 1763, more than 50 Paxton Boys rode to the settlement near Millersville, Pennsylvania, killed six, and burned their cabins. Pennsylvania authorities placed the remaining fourteen Susquehannock in protective custody in Lancaster, but the Paxton Boys broke in and slaughtered all fourteen on December 27, 1763. A month earlier, 140 Moravian Lenape and Mohican in eastern Pennsylvania had been moved to Philadelphia for their protection. The Paxton Boys marched on Philadelphia in February 1764 with a few hundred followers, however, dispersed after meeting with a delegation headed by Benjamin Franklin.

=== Old Paxton Church ===
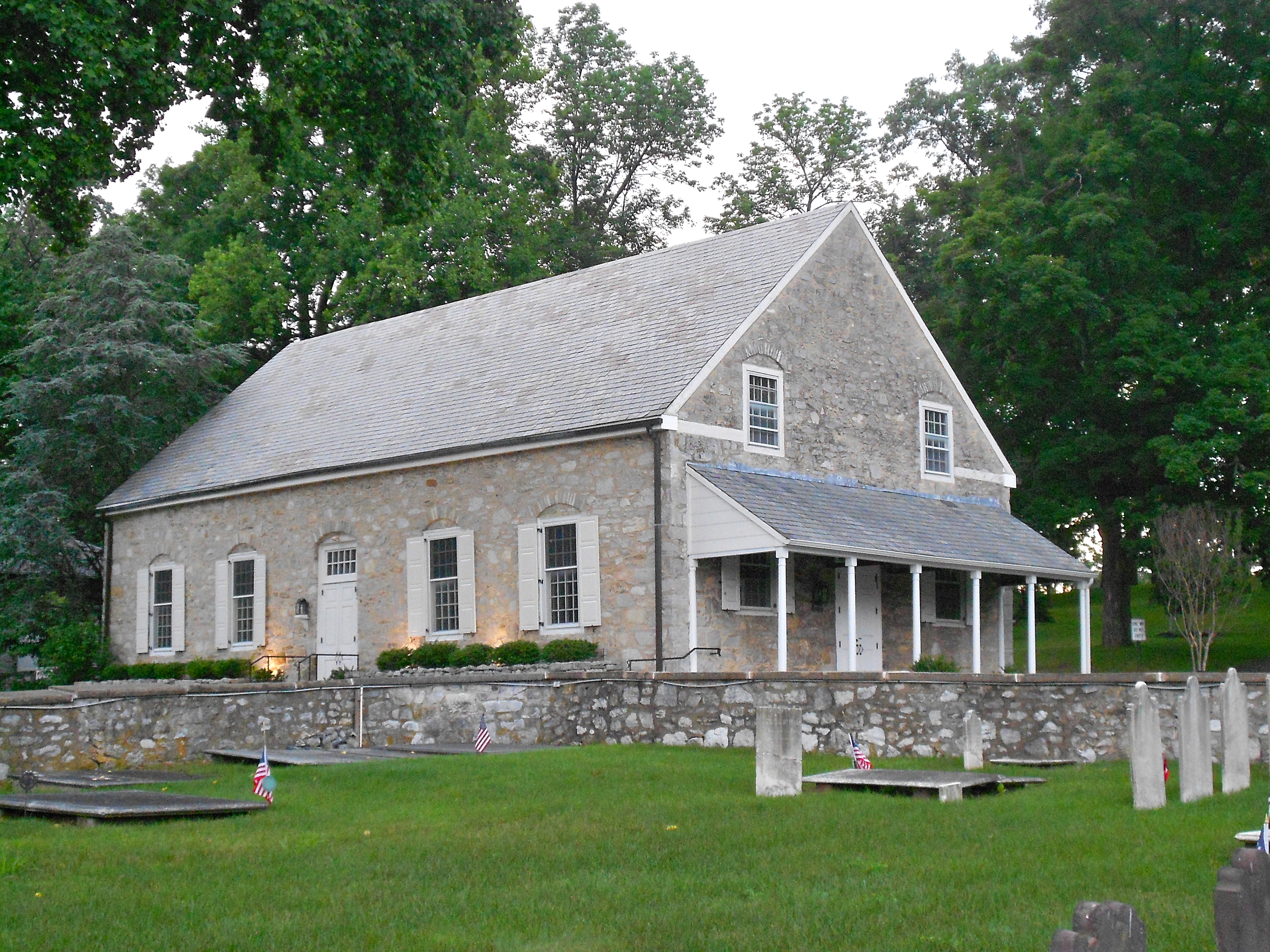
Paxton Presbyterian Church

Paxtang is home to the Old Paxton Church, one of the earliest in the area. Built in 1740, the church is the oldest Presbyterian Church building in continuous use in Pennsylvania, and the second oldest in the United States. In 1726, the Rev. James Anderson of Donegal, Pennsylvania, became the first regular preacher. The history of the church is interwoven with the history of central colonial Pennsylvania.

In 1732, the congregation was officially organized as a Presbyterian Church by the Presbytery of Donegal, with the Rev. William Bertram as the first installed pastor. The Rev. John Elder, the "Fighting Parson," became pastor in 1738. He was pastor during the French and Indian War and Revolutionary War, and served as a commissioned officer. Many of the church's pastors have served long pastorates; the terms of four of its ministers total 140 years.

The present stone sanctuary was erected in 1740, replacing a log meeting house which had previously served as the place of worship. A stone marker south of the sanctuary indicates the site of the log building. A replica of the log meeting house was erected north of the present sanctuary.

Adjacent to the church is a historic cemetery. Here lie the bodies of soldiers of the French and Indian War, the Revolutionary War, the Civil War, and both World Wars. People who molded the early religious and political character of America are buried here, including John Brisban Rutherford, John Harris Jr., William Maclay (the first United States senator from Pennsylvania), and four of the six commissioners who planned the town of Harrisburg with him in 1785. Ministers, legislators, farmers, teachers, men of affairs, and enslaved African Americans are buried here.

== Geography ==
Paxtang is located in southern Dauphin County at 40°15′39″N 76°50′2″W (40.260760, -76.833782). It is bordered to the west by the city of Harrisburg.

According to the United States Census Bureau, the borough has a total area of 0.41 square miles (1.05 km^{2}), all land.

Paxtang Park is located along the city boundary with Harrisburg and is a trailhead for the Capital Area Greenbelt.

== Demographics ==
Historical population
Census	Pop.	Note	%±
1920	822		—
1930	1,594		93.9%
1940	1,707		7.1%
1950	1,857		8.8%
1960	1,916		3.2%
1970	2,039		6.4%
1980	1,649		−19.1%
1990	1,599		−3.0%
2000	1,570		−1.8%
2010	1,561		−0.6%
2020	1,648		5.6%
2021 (est.)	1,636	▼	−0.7%

As of the 2010 census, there were 1,561 people, 660 households, and 415 families living in the borough. The population density was 3,732.1 inhabitants per square mile (1,441.0/km^{2}). There were 698 housing units at an average density of 1,668.8 units per square mile (644.3/km^{2}). The racial makeup of the borough was 79% White (75.4% Non-Hispanic White), 10.6% Black or African American, 9.1% Hispanic or Latino (5.6% Puerto Rican), 1.9% Asian, 3.8% from other races, and 4.5% from two or more races (Multiracial).

Of the 660 households, 31.7% had children under the age of 18 living with them, 45.3% were married couples living together, 12.6% had a female householder with no husband present, and 37.1% were non-families. 29.4% of all households were made up of individuals, and 18.8% had someone living alone who was 65 years of age or older. The average household size was 2.37 and the average family size was 2.94.

As of the census of 2000, there were 1,570 people, 670 households, and 438 families living in the borough. The population density was 3,753.6 inhabitants per square mile (1,449.3/km^{2}). There were 703 housing units at an average density of 1,680.8 per square mile (649.0/km^{2}). The racial makeup of the borough was 88.54% White, 6.37% African American, 0.13% Native American, 1.53% Asian, 1.66% from other races, and 1.78% from two or more races. Hispanic or Latino of any race were 4.01% of the population.

There were 670 households, out of which 31.6% had children under the age of 18 living with them, 50.7% were married couples living together, 11.9% had a female householder with no husband present, and 34.5% were non-families. 30.6% of all households were made up of individuals, and 11.6% had someone living alone who was 65 years of age or older. The average household size was 2.34 and the average family size was 2.91.

In the borough, the population was spread out, with 24.4% under the age of 18, 6.4% from 18 to 24, 29.9% from 25 to 44, 24.4% from 45 to 64, and 14.9% who were 65 years of age or older. The median age was 39 years. For every 100 females, there were 87.4 males. For every 100 females age 18 and over, there were 84.3 males.

The median income for a household in the borough was $46,250, and the median income for a family was $54,412. Males had a median income of $36,389 versus $29,712 for females. The per capita income for the borough was $23,217. About 3.4% of families and 4.5% of the population were below the poverty line, including 7.7% of those under age 18 and 4.7% of those age 65 or over.

== Education ==
Children in the borough attend public school in the Central Dauphin School District.

== See also ==
- Harrisburg–Carlisle metropolitan statistical area
