= Timeline of Harrisburg, Pennsylvania history =

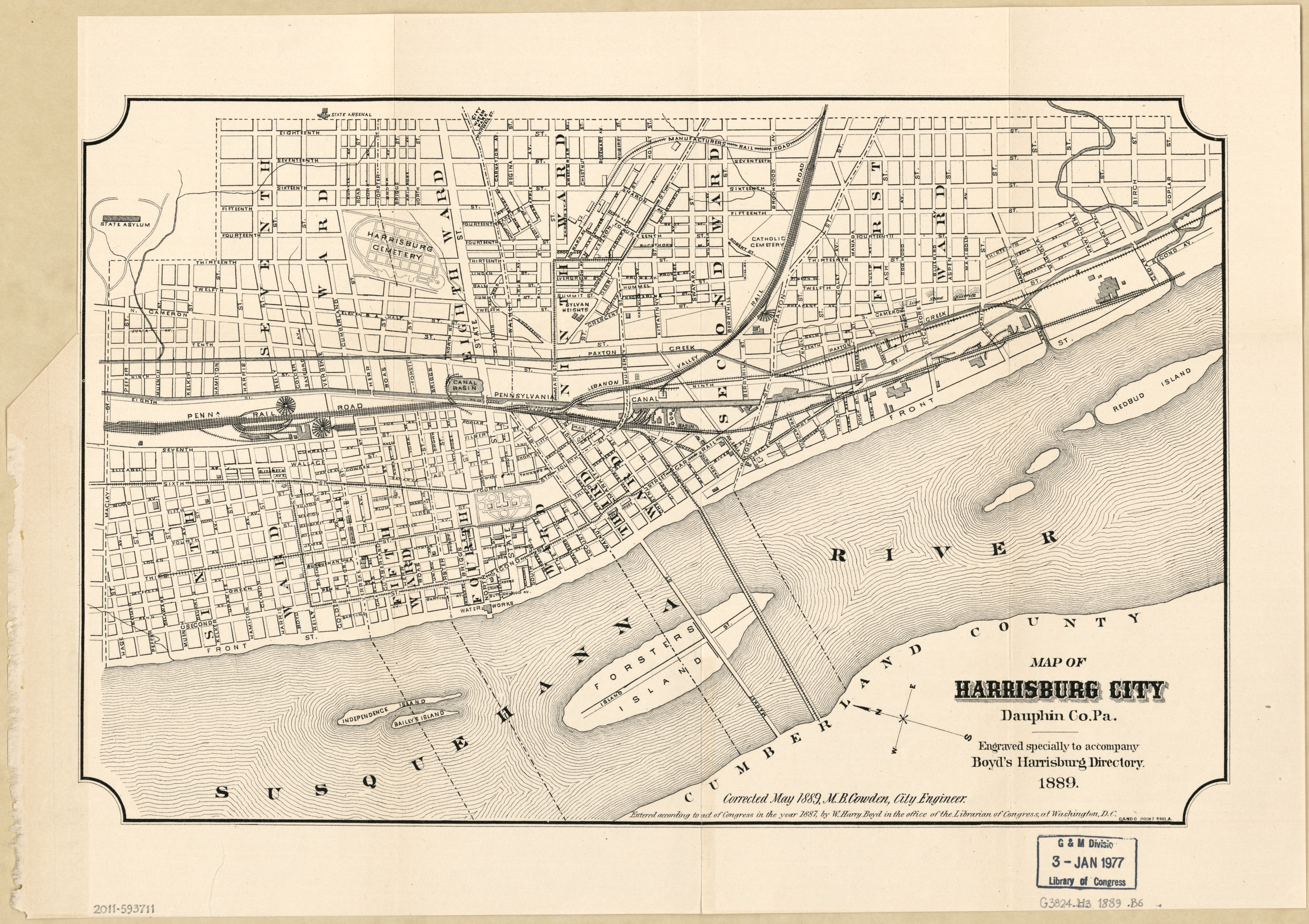
1889 Map of Harrisburg City

This is a timeline of the major events in the history of Harrisburg, Pennsylvania and vicinity.

== Early America ==
- 1608 Captain John Smith was recorded making contact with the Susquehannock Indians while journeying up the Susquehanna River.
- Late 1600s French trader Peter Bisaillon, located at the mouth of Paxton Creek, was among the first Europeans to scout the land. Once the Native Americans began to fear the settlers, Bisaillon acted as a principal interpreter at Indian conferences, and would relocate with the remaining French traders to Ohio.
- 1719 Harrisburg settled as trading post by John Harris, Sr., settler from Yorkshire, England
- 1740 The Parson John Elder house is built for John Elder of Paxtang and is the oldest structure in what is now city limits in East Harrisburg.
- 1766 John Harris, Jr.. constructs a permanent stone home, still standing at 219 South Front Street
- 1789 Harrisburg's first Newspaper, The Harrisburgh Journal and the Weekly Advertiser, is first published on September 9 by T. Roberts & Co. for a $2 annual subscription
- 1792
  - Pennsylvania's canal era begins (1792–1931)
  - The Oracle of Dauphin, is first printed and published by John Wyeth and John W. Allen

== 19th century ==
- 1812 Harrisburg becomes State Capital (seat of government for Pennsylvania)
- 1818 Construction begins on the original capitol building (finished 1822)
- 1820
  - First bridge built at Harrisburg: The "Camelback Bridge" (a wooden, covered bridge).
  - Newspaper The Pennsylvania Intelligencer founded
  - Population: 2,990.
- 1822 Original Harrisburg State Capitol building completed (started 1818; burned Feb 1897)
- 1831 Cumberland Valley Railroad completed.
- 1833 Harrisburg Nail Works opens across the river
- 1834
  - Pennsylvania Canal opens at Harrisburg
  - Dauphin Deposit Bank established.
- 1836 First train enters Harrisburg, operated by the Harrisburg, Mount Joy, and Lancaster RR
- 1837 Harrisburg's first railroad (RR) station built.
- 1839 Cumberland County RR Bridge goes into operation; would burn down in 1841.
- 1847 President James K. Polk appointed Jonas K. Rudy as the first letter carrier.
- 1850
  - Harrisburg's first anthracite furnace built (Porter Furnace).
  - U.S. Census lists 1,376 dwellings and 7,834 people.
- 1851 The State Lunatic Hospital built in Harrisburg: One of the largest institutions in town
- 1852 Harrisburg Cotton Manufacturing Co built.
- 1853 Central Iron Works established in Harrisburg.
- 1854
  - Newspaper Pennsylvania Patriot established
  - Harrisburg YMCA established at the Market Square Church (formerly English Presbyterian Congregation).
  - Pennsylvania RR from Harrisburg to Pittsburgh (Main Line) is finished.
- 1857
  - Swatara (McCormack) Furnace built in South Hanover township nearby.
  - Much larger RR station is built
- 1858 First Reading RR train in Harrisburg.
- 1860
  - Harrisburg incorporated as a city.
  - West Harrisburg Market Company is formed by William K. Verbeke, which would become the Broad Street Market.
- 1861-65 City played active role in the Civil War
- 1861
  - First horsecar operation: The Street Railway Company.
  - Camp Curtin established nearby: Large Union Army training ground.
- 1864 Lochiel Rolling Mill makes rails for RR.
- 1865-73 Expanded trolley lines (Capitol Area Transit)
- 1866 Paxton Rolling Mills built.
- 1867 Pennsylvania Steel Works, south of Harrisburg, was first in the US to produce steel ingots on order.
- 1869 Historical Society of Dauphin County is founded by leading citizens at a meeting in Market Square Presbyterian Church.
- 1873
  - Horse-drawn passenger railway company opened
  - First street in Harrisburg is paved.
- 1875 Harrisburg and Middletown Omnibus Co. was organized to bring passengers to the trolley.
- 1877
  - Central Iron Works new plant built by Charles Bailey
  - City troops guard the arsenal upon the Great Railroad Strike of 1877.
- 1878 Telephones installed in Harrisburg.
- 1880
  - Steelton incorporated.
  - First lighting plant installed in Harrisburg by Thomas Edison
- 1885 Harrisburg's Centennial celebration
- 1886
  - Chamber of Commerce established.
  - Single horse trolley to Allison Hill then expanded to Steelton.
- 1887
  - New RR station (Harrisburg Central Railroad Station) built on site of the first two.
  - New Cumberland County bridge is built.
- 1888 First electric trolley service: Served Steelton, Allison Hill, expanded areas in Harrisburg.
- 1889
  - Market square market houses torn down.
  - YMCA Pennsylvania Railroad Branch established; moved to 611 Reily Street in 1903.
- 1890
  - Second bridge completed: the Walnut Street Bridge.
  - Harrisburg City Library opens on Market Square site.
- 1891 Mulberry St Bridge (#1) completed, encouraging building on Allison Hill: One of the first suburbs.
- 1892 End of the horse-drawn trolley. The second streetcar company was formed: Line to Steelton – Oberlin and Harrisburg.
- 1893 First office building opens, the Dauphin Building.
- 1894 Trolley service crossed the Walnut Street “Peoples Bridge”.
- 1896 Streetcar service expanded to New Cumberland, and along Simpson Ferry Road towards Mechanicsburg; also within Carlisle.
- 1896-1902 West Shore (of the Susquehanna River) lines expanded to include Boiling Springs, Newville, West Fairview, Enola, and Marysville.
- 1897 Original Harrisburg State Capitol building burned.
- 1898 33 different ethnicities counted in Harrisburg by special census

== 20th century ==
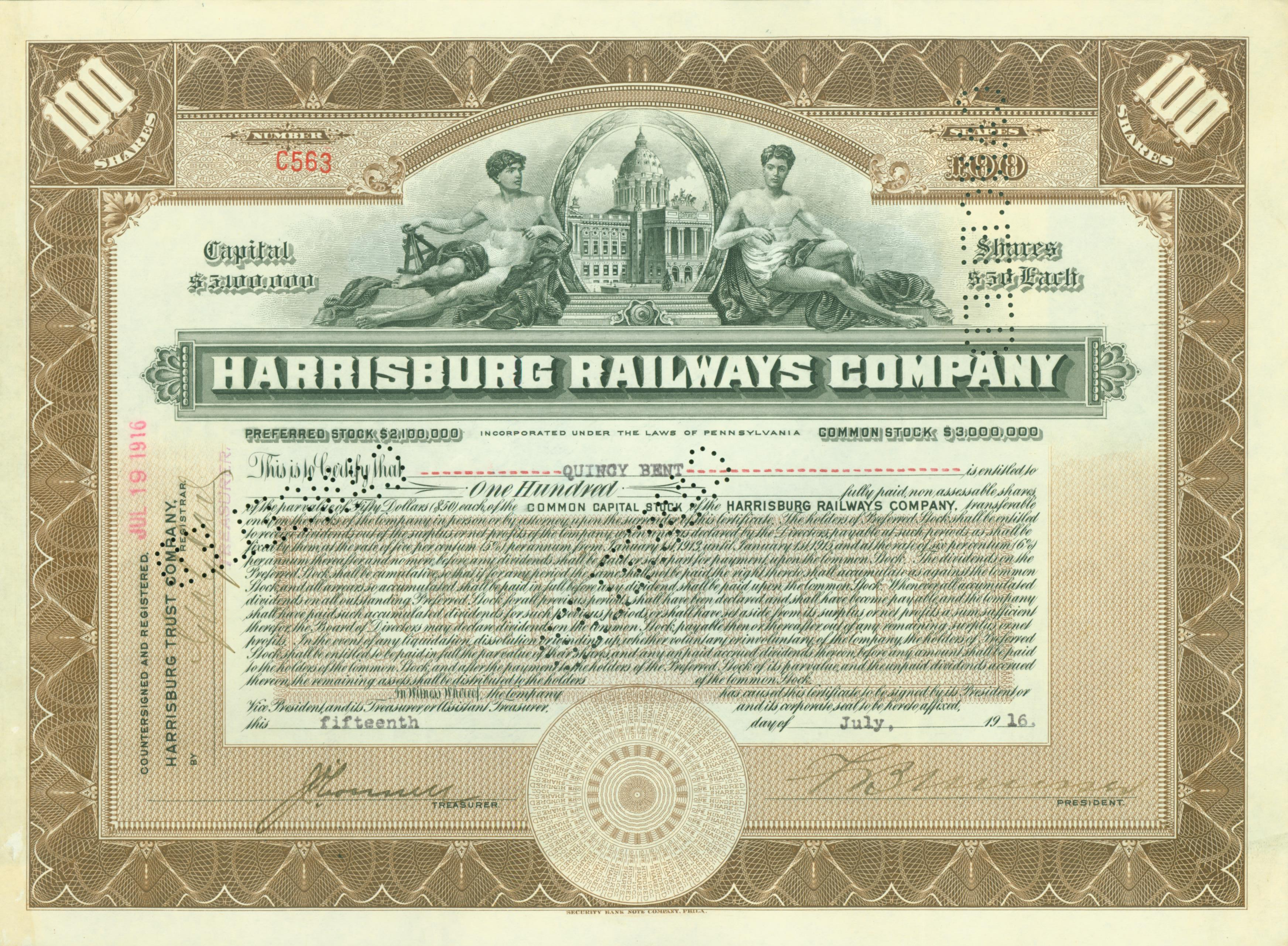
Share of the Harrisburg Railways Company, issued 15. July 1916

- 1900-1920 City Beautiful Movement; Mira Lloyd Dock calls for modern improvements and beautification.
- 1901 Pennsylvania Canal is closed.
- 1902
  - First automobile in city.
  - Camelback Bridge partially destroyed by flood.
  - Rockville Bridge built.
  - Vance McCormick elected mayor on reform ticket.
  - New water filter plant on City Island.
- 1903
  - Damaged Camelback bridge removed and replaced.
  - Hershey plant planned.
  - Trolley service expanded to Linglestown, Hummelstown, and Dauphin. This required a consolidation of shops and car barns located at various places through the service area.
- 1904 100 passenger trains stop in the city each day.
- 1905
  - Market Street Bridge built in the place of the old Camelback Bridge.
  - First motion picture theater in Harrisburg.
  - City's first skyscraper built: United Trust Company.
- 1906 New State Capitol building dedicated.
- 1907 Hershey Park opened
- 1910 Bellevue Park neighborhood opened: First planned neighborhood in Harrisburg and central PA.
- 1911 Rotary Club opened: First service club in Harrisburg
- 1912 Riverwalk construction begun.
- 1913
  - The transit company reorganized as "Harrisburg Railways".
  - Dock Street Dam is completed on the Susquehanna River
- 1914
  - City Beautiful continues, raises money with bonds (Eggert 338).
  - City library opened.
- 1915 Great Migration brings many black workers to Harrisburg's steel mills
- 1916
  - Bethlehem Steel takes over PA Steel Co in Steelton
  - First Kipona Festival held
- 1918 Penn-Harris Hotel constructed (demolished in 1973)
- 1919 African-American YMCA branch established.
- 1920 The last trolleys were acquired.
- 1921 Island Park bathing beach has 235,000 visitors per year.
- 1924
  - First radio station begins to broadcast.
  - Decline in trolley ridership began on both sides of the river.
- 1926
  - City Beautiful related projects, costing $250,000.
  - Market Street Bridge widened from two lanes to four.
- 1926-30 State Street Bridge built: part of the Capitol complex.
- 1929-1939 The Great Depression
- 1930 Bus service replaces trolley on the Carlisle to Mechanicsburg line west of the river.
- 1931 Pennsylvania's Canal era ends (1792–1931). Harrisburg Symphony Orchestra first plays.
- 1933
  - YMCA Central Branch opens on Front Street.
  - Three trolley lines replaced by buses: Ten buses placed in service.
  - Hotel Hershey opens.
  - African-American YMCA branch builds Forster Street Branch.
- 1934 Bethesda Mission acquires building at 611 Reily Street from the PA Railroad YMCA.
- 1937
  - Hershey strike put down.
  - The trolley company changed to Harrisburg Railways Company and remained in use until 1973.
- 1938 All remaining trolley lines on west shore abandoned.
- 1939 July 16: Buses replace trolleys in Harrisburg. The last Harrisburg Railways Trolley closed. A fleet of 135 buses remained under the Harrisburg Railways Company.
- 1939-73 Bus service continued but riders lessened due to more auto ownership (Capitol Area Transit).
- 1941 Mansion of John Harris, Jr., and later Lincoln's first Secretary of War Simon Cameron becomes home of Historical Society of Dauphin County.
- 1943
  - Aircraft manufacturer Aircraft and Marine Products (AMP) moves to Harrisburg (now TE Connectivity).
  - New Dauphin County Courthouse opens: Art Deco.
- 1947 Merchant's and Men's Mutual Insurance moves to Front St.
- 1949 Pennsylvania national insurance group moves to new HQ on Derry St.
- 1950 89,554 people live in Harrisburg: Largest Standard Metropolitan Area population in city's history. Harrisburg Standard Metropolitan Area (SMA), consisting of Cumberland and Dauphin counties, was first defined.
- 1952 Harvey Taylor Bridge opens to help traffic to west shore. Forster Street widened.
- 1953 Hall Manor built.
- 1956 Old Central Iron and Steel demolished for the anticipated John Harris Bridge.
- 1958
  - Dock Street and several streets are razed and 150 houses in Shipoke demolished for the anticipated John Harris Bridge.
  - IBM builds branch in Mechanicsburg, west of the river.
- 1959
  - Following a term change by the Bureau of the Budget (present-day Office of Management and Budget), the Harrisburg SMA became the Harrisburg Standard Metropolitan Statistical Area (SMSA).
  - Urban renewal leads to the elimination of streets and houses around Midtown and Fox Ridge between North Sixth and Seventh streets for commercial redevelopment.
- 1960
  - Historic governor's mansion demolished for a parking lot.
  - John Harris Bridge on the river opened.
  - The Jackson-Lick projects, consisting of the C. Sylvester Jackson and Alton W. Lick towers, are built.
- 1960s Olmstead Air Force Base closed.
- 1961 Harrisburg Expressway opened: Paxton Street to Hampden Township on the West Shore, via the John Harris Bridge.
- 1963 Perry County added to the Harrisburg SMSA.
- 1964 Commonwealth of PA razed the Forster Street Branch YMCA for government expansion
- 1966
  - Penn State opened campus on former Olmstead AFB.
  - The former Forster Street Branch YMCA occupies the newly constructed Camp Curtin Branch YMCA on 2135 North 6th Street.
- 1969 Protests and turmoil referred to as the "race riots" occur in the summer amid racial tensions among black and white communities
- 1972 Severe flooding resulting from Hurricane Agnes.
- 1973
  - Urban renewal demolished the Penn-Harris Hotel (built in 1918).
  - Public bus service acquired by the city from the Harrisburg Railways Company.
- 1974 Construction of the Cumberland Court apartments in Fox Ridge begins starting with the elimination of Cumberland Street east of Third Street, Hay Street, and Montgomery Streets.
- 1983 Harrisburg SMSA renamed the Harrisburg–Lebanon–Carlisle Metropolitan Statistical Area (MSA)[3]; Lebanon County added to the MSA.
- 1996 Collapse of the West Shore portion of the Walnut Street Bridge as a result of rising flood waters from the North American blizzard of 1996.

== 21st century ==
- 2003 MSA split into two separate metropolitan areas – Harrisburg–Carlisle metropolitan statistical area (Cumberland, Dauphin, and Perry counties) and the Lebanon Metropolitan Statistical Area (Lebanon County). Together, the two MSAs form the Harrisburg–Carlisle metropolitan statistical area.
- 2010
  - After upset in the primary elections over long-time mayor Stephen R. Reed, first female and first black mayor Linda D. Thompson took office in January.
  - The Harrisburg-York-Lebanon urban agglomeration area is defined for the first time, linking York County to the CSA.
- 2011 After filing for bankruptcy, a state-appointed receiver (William B. Lynch) took control of the City finances.
- 2013 Receiver Lynch released his comprehensive voluntary plan and it was enacted, where the budget became balanced again in the late 2010s.
- 2018 Mayor Eric R. Papenfuse began Vision Zero strategy for Harrisburg to eliminate pedestrian fatalities through more intelligent street planning.
- 2020 Mayor Eric Papenfuse restructured the Harrisburg Bureau of Police to separately house its new Community Services Division and created new Community Service Aide positions in continued efforts to improve community policing.
- 2022 Final payment of $125.6 million in debt (including interest) incurred by former mayor Stephen Reed in 1997 from Series D and F bonds was finally repaid after 25 years, setting the City up to be debt free the following year.
- 2023 A severe fire caused by a Rite-Hite HVLS ceiling fan tore through the brick building of the Broad Street Market, nearest to 6th Street, in the early morning hours of July 10, 2023 causing major damage to the roof and a loss of the building contents.
- 2025 A terrorist attack by arson took place on the governor's mansion inhabited by Governor Josh Shapiro, Pennsylvania's first Jewish governor, and his family.. The perpetrator, Cody A. Balmer, revealed a motivation rooted in antisemitism and anti-Zionism.

== See also ==
- List of mayors of Harrisburg, Pennsylvania
