= William H. Kepner =

American politician

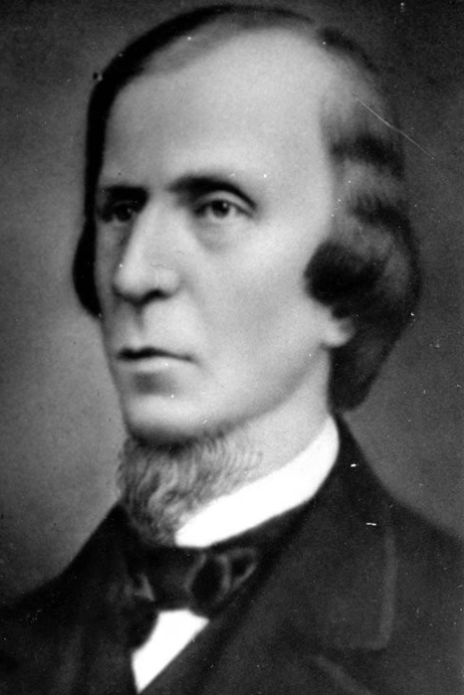
- Portrait of William H. Kepner

Mayor of Harrisburg
- In office 1860–1863
- Preceded by: Office established
- Succeeded by: Augustus L. Roumfort

Personal details
- Born: William Henry Kepner; January 19, 1810; Bern Township, Pennsylvania, U.S.
- Died: January 18, 1871 (60 years old)
- Resting place: Harrisburg Cemetery
- Political party: Democratic
- Spouse: Cassandra Loucks (m. 1842)
- Children: 2

William Henry Kepner (January 19, 1810 – January 18, 1871) was an American businessman, public organizer, and politician who served as the first elected Mayor of Harrisburg, Pennsylvania.

== Early life ==
Kepner was born in Bern Township, Pennsylvania. In 1823, he and his family moved to Harrisburg, Pennsylvania, where his father Samuel built the first steam flour mill in Harrisburg.

== Career ==
Kepner adopted and continued the business of his father to much success. During this time, he became involved in municipal affairs. When the town became a borough, Kepner was elected a borough councilman. Upon the amendment to the charter to become a city, he was elected by a majority of 330 on April 13, 1860, as the first mayor of Harrisburg.

During his tenure as mayor, he fought with City Council over the interpretation of the rules of City Charter, as Council was attempting to pass budgets without consulting him. The conflict led to the Pennsylvania Supreme Court case Kepner v. Commonwealth in 1861, which decided that the Council may create legislation, but if the Mayor is not considered he has no obligation to sign it.

Kepner also formally received Edward VII, Prince of Wales, during his visit to Harrisburg in 1860 as part of his tour of the U.S. and Canada.

Political offices
Preceded by none	Mayor of Harrisburg, Pennsylvania; 1860–1863	Succeeded by Augustus L. Roumfort
