= Charles A. Miller (Pennsylvania politician) =

American politician

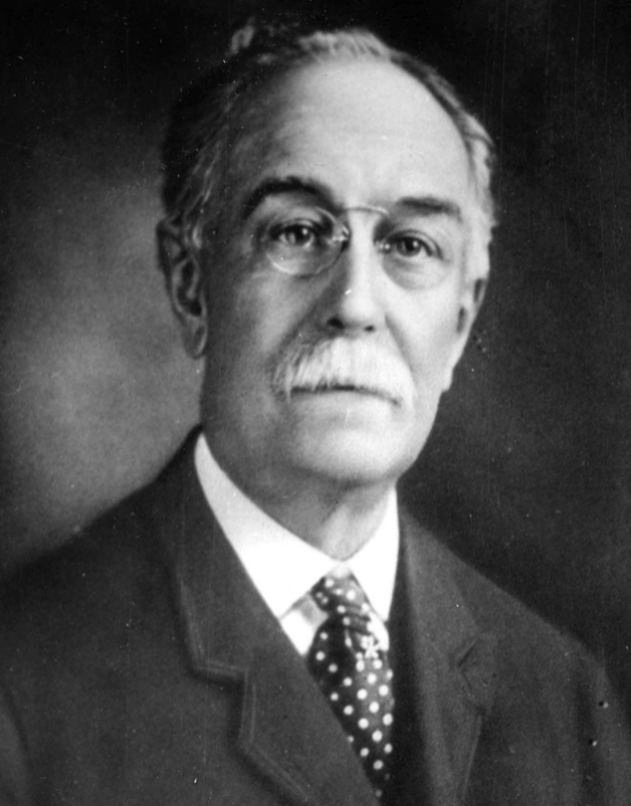

Mayor of Harrisburg
- In office 1917–1917
- Preceded by: William L. Gorgas (acting Mayor)
- Succeeded by: William L. Gorgas (acting Mayor)

Pennsylvania House of Representatives
- In office 1885–1886

Personal details
- Born: Charles Augustus Miller; June 28, 1850 Harrisburg, Pennsylvania, U.S.
- Died: July 12, 1917 (67 years old)
- Resting place: Harrisburg Cemetery
- Party: Republican
- Spouse: Rebecca Mauger (d. 1906)
- Children: 2 daughters
- Parent: Francis Xavier "X" Miller (father)
- Education: St. Charles Borromeo College

Charles Augustus Miller (June 28, 1850 – July 12, 1917) was an American businessman, newsworker, and politician from Harrisburg, Pennsylvania who served as a Pennsylvania State Representative, Harrisburg City Councilman, and Mayor of Harrisburg.

== Biography ==
Raised in Harrisburg, Miller attended the Harrisburg Academy and went on to graduate from St. Charles Borromeo College in 1871 with Honors. Miller entered public service in 1880, elected as a city councilman while working as a printer. Elected president of the council in 1882, he also worked for the Harrisburg Telegraph as a foreman in the composing room from 1881 to 1885.

In 1885, he resigned after being elected to the Pennsylvania House of Representatives as a member of the Republican ticket for the city district. Following his term as a representative, he was reelected to the city council in 1888, became an early supporter of the City Beautiful Movement, and was regarded as an expert on municipal law.

In 1915, Miller was elected to be the first president of the Harrisburg Councilman Association.

Following the death of Mayor Ezra S. Meals, Miller was unanimously elected as mayor by the city council on May 15, 1917, fulfilling his lifelong ambition to serve as the city's chief executive.

== Death ==
After a long complication of diseases, he died on July 12, 1917.

Political offices
Preceded by William L. Gorgas	Mayor of Harrisburg, Pennsylvania; 1917–1917	Succeeded by William L. Gorgas
