= Fritchey =

Fritchey is a surname. Notable people with the surname include:

- Clayton Fritchey (1904–2001), American journalist
- John Fritchey (born 1964), American politician
- John Augustus Fritchey (1857–1916), American physician and politician
