= Simon C. Wilson =

American telegraph operator, infantryman and politician (1841-1886)

Simon Cameron Wilson
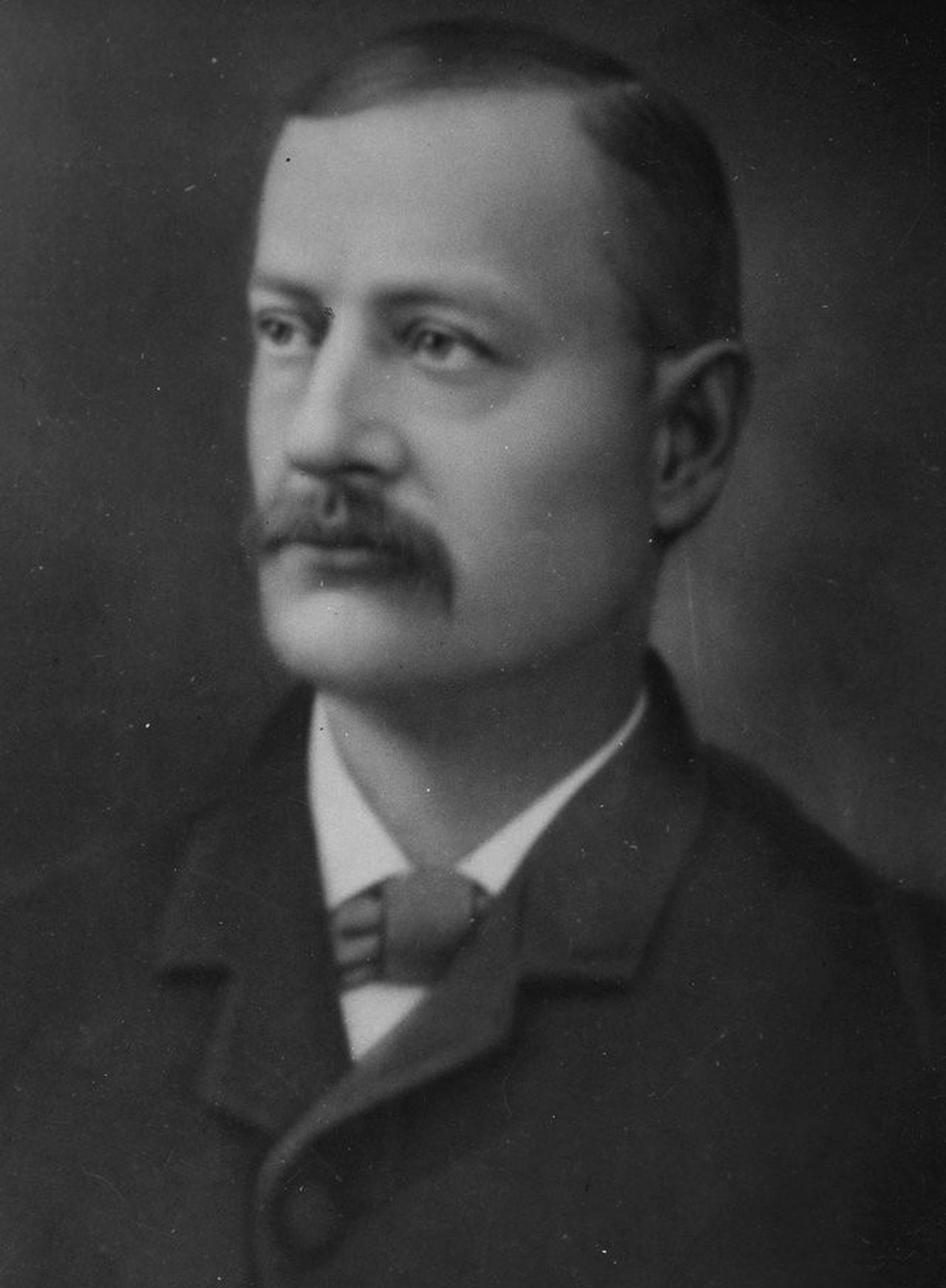

Mayor of Harrisburg
- In office 1883–1886
- Preceded by: John C. Herman
- Succeeded by: Samuel W. Fleming

Personal details
- Born: Simon Cameron Wilson; November 8, 1841 Harrisburg, Pennsylvania, U.S.
- Died: November 27, 1886 (45 years old)
- Resting place: Harrisburg Cemetery
- Party: Republican
- Spouse: Augusta M. Kamerer
- Children: Edward Wilson

Simon Cameron Wilson (November 8, 1841 – November 27, 1886) was an American telegraph operator, Union Army infantryman, and politician who served as Mayor of Harrisburg. From his youth, he worked as a telegraph operator for the Northern Central Railway, holding the position of Chief Electrician during the American Civil War for the railroad's telegraph system and eventually earning the rank of superintendent of the Baltimore Line from Harrisburg, until his retirement from the railroad in 1877. During the Civil War, Wilson also held the rank of Corporal with the I Company of the 77th Pennsylvania Infantry Regiment.

During the Battle of Gettysburg, following the discovered sabotaged Military Telegraph line at Hanover Junction by the Confederate cavalry earlier in the campaign, Wilson reconnected the line at the Junction and, with his own pocket telegraph and fine wire, followed the Northern Central railroad back to Gettysburg, using fence posts as telegraph poles along the route. This allowed General Meade to establish communication to Washington until the conclusion of the battle.

Following his retirement, he entered politics, where he won the Republican nomination for Mayor of Harrisburg over incumbent John C. Herman on February 4, 1883, and then defeated Democratic opponent John H. Gramm in the general election on February 20, 1883. Wilson died suddenly at 9 pm on November 27, 1886, from heart disease.

Political offices
Preceded by John C. Herman	Mayor of Harrisburg, Pennsylvania; 1883–1886	Succeeded by Samuel W. Fleming
