= Harrisburg Bureau of Police =

City police force in Pennsylvania, U.S.

- Common name: Harrisburg Police Department (misnomer)

Agency overview
- Formed: 1861; 165 years ago
- Employees: 189 (2023)
- Annual budget: $20.4 M (2023)

Jurisdictional structure
- Area: 11.4 sq mi (29.53 km2)
- Population: 50,099 (2020)

Operational structure
- Overseen by: Department of Public Safety
- Headquarters: 123 Walnut Street, Harrisburg, PA 17101-1618
- Sworn members: ▼136 of 162 (2024)
- Agency executives: Thomas Carter, Police Commissioner; Kenny Young, Deputy Chief of Police

Facilities
- Substations: Allison Hill Police Substation

Website
- http://harrisburgpa.gov/bureau-of-police/

Harrisburg Bureau of Police is a medium-sized city police force in South Central Pennsylvania serving the City of Harrisburg, Pennsylvania. In 2021, Harrisburg had the eighth largest police department in the Commonwealth of Pennsylvania by total law enforcement employees. Since 2003, the Bureau has achieved and maintained its annual status of an Accredited Agency under the Pennsylvania Chiefs of Police Association Accreditation Program. It is one of only 131 agencies across the state to voluntarily apply for and earn the accreditation.

== History ==
Records show that the first police force was loosely assembled in Harrisburg city in 1861, with an unknown number of non-uniformed "Constables" making their money from fees of those arrested. Under former Mayor John Augustus Fritchey, the Police Department was formally reorganized in 1888 with official uniforms and 26 men placed on salary. That year, police call boxes were installed (and later booths). Alvin W. Weikert was appointed Chief of Police by the Mayor in 1889; the Chief worked dayshift while the Lieutenant assumed acting control for nights. The first police station was held inside the former Masonic Hall (more commonly referred to at the time as the Exchange Building) on Walnut St & 3rd St, but moved locations many times in the next decades, finally relocating to the first floor and basement of the Old City Hall building at 423 Walnut Street after its conversion from the Technical High School in 1929. Following the completion and opening of the Vance C. McCormick Public Service Center on June 17, 1982, the Bureau of Police relocated to its current day headquarters.

Since the 1970s through today, the Bureau sometimes participates with local Universities to allow researchers to conduct research and publish articles regarding their policing methodologies.

In the mid-2000s, a substation opened at 15th & Drummond Streets in the Allison Hill neighborhood. Following a period of its disuse, it was reconstructed from a modular building in 2018 at a cost of $1 million (funded primarily through grants). However, due to the COVID-19 pandemic, the Allison Hill Police Substation was not reopened to the public until July 2020.

In 2021, the Bureau's officers were overwhelmingly white despite patrolling a majority minority city, and in an ongoing problem it struggled to recruit minority officers in what was called a "perception problem" with the occupation.

== Vehicles ==
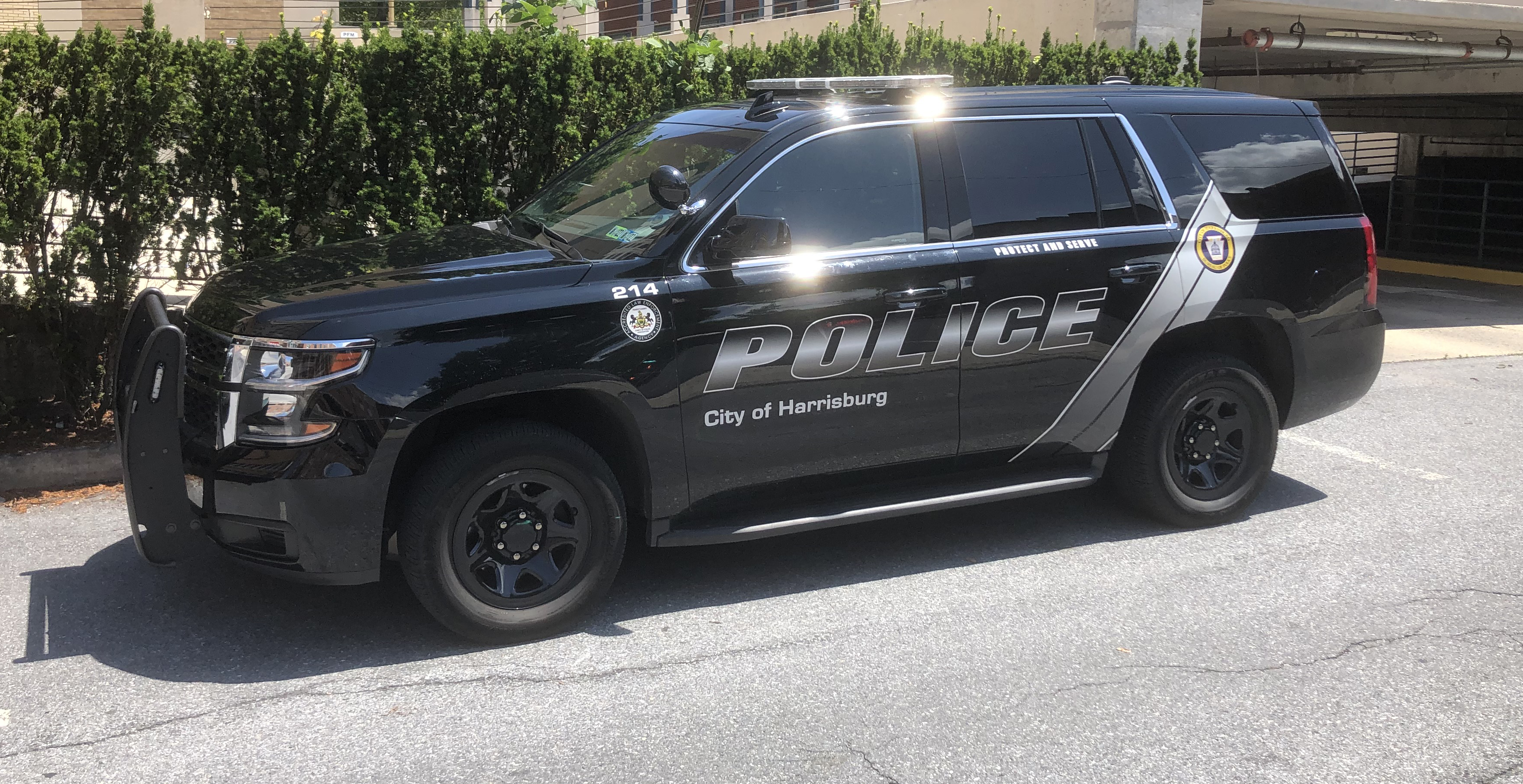
Chevy Tahoe PPV

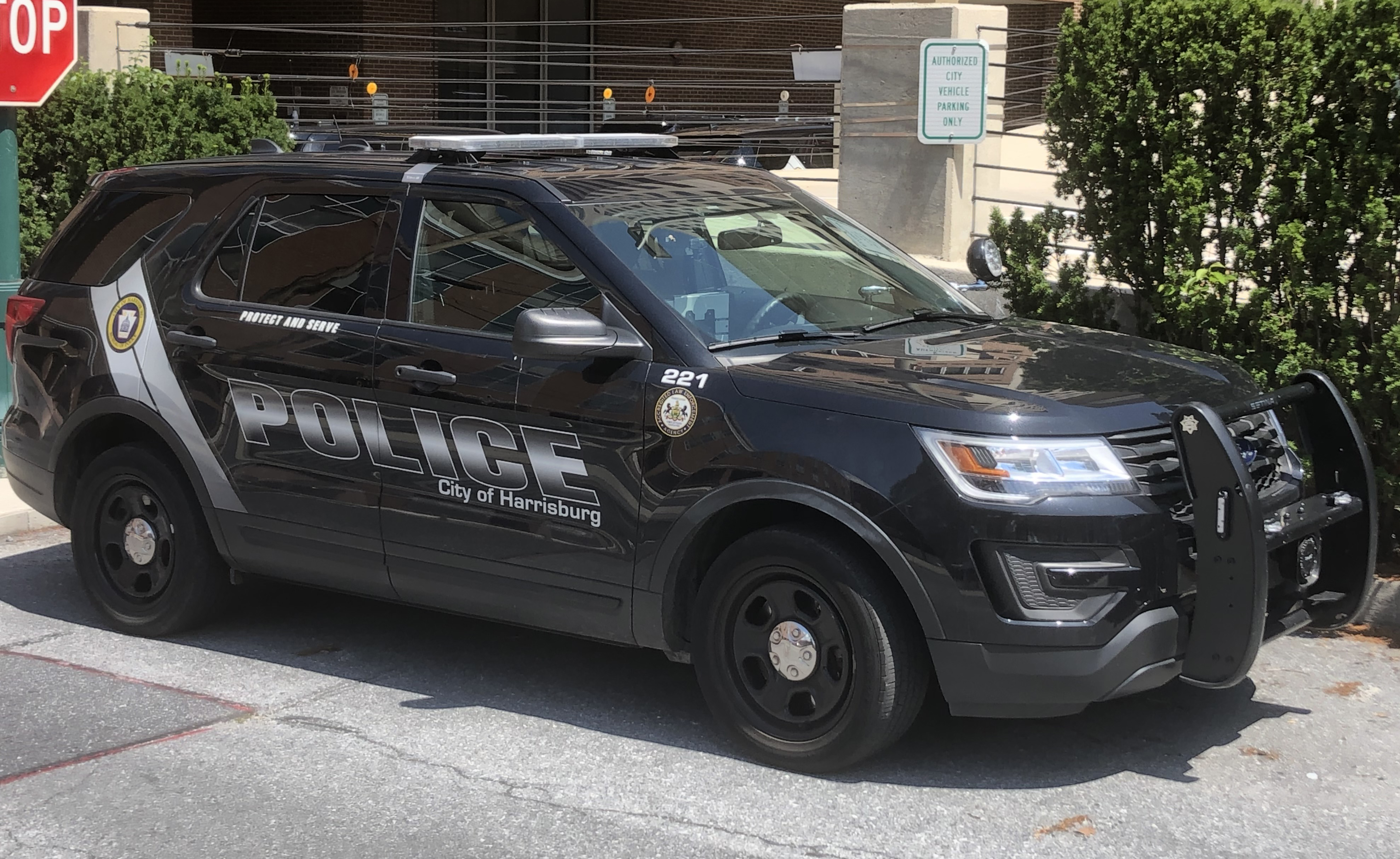
Ford Police Interceptor Utility

In the past, HBP operated an all Chevrolet fleet. The fleet consisted of Chevrolet Caprice PPV sedans and Chevrolet Tahoe PPV SUV used for K-9 patrols. In 2016, HBP revealed new Ford patrol vehicles as well as a new paint scheme, ditching the dark blue with yellow lettering for a more traditional black and white cars. Originally, the new scheme was only on new vehicles being introduced, while older Chevy units retained the old colors (until entirely withdrawn from service three months later). Currently, the department utilizes a mix of Ford Police Interceptor Utility, Ford Police Interceptor Sedan, Chevrolet Tahoe PPV, and Ford Transit Prisoner Transport vehicles moving now to an all-black color scheme.

== Agency structure and Divisions ==
=== Agency structure ===
The Bureau is organized under the Harrisburg Department of Public Safety, along with the Bureau of Fire, Bureau of Codes, Office of Health, and Office of Parking Enforcement. The current Police Commissioner is Thomas Carter. The current Deputy Chief of Police is Kenny Young. Historically, 3 Captains lead the Uniformed Patrol, Technical Services, and Criminal Investigation Divisions. In 2020, the force was reorganized to include a Community Services Division to house the community needs more cohesively outside of the Uniformed Patrol Division.

=== Divisions ===
- Uniformed Patrol Division
- Technical Services Division
- Community Services Division
- Criminal Investigation Division

=== Rank structure ===
Insignia	Rank title	Information
	Commissioner/Chief	The Commissioner/Chief is head of HBP, appointed by the mayor.
	Deputy Chief of Police	The deputy chief of police is second-in-command of HBP.
	Captain	Captains are in charge of a Division.
	Lieutenant	Lieutenants are Second-in-Command of a Division, leader of some Units.
	Sergeant	Sergeants are Supervisors, leader of some units and squads.
	Corporal	Corporals are Supervisors.
	Detective	An officer assigned to the Criminal Investigation Division.
	Police Officer	

== Fallen officers ==
As of November 2026, seven Harrisburg Bureau of Police officers lost their lives on duty:

Rank	Name	End of Watch	Cause of death	Ref
Patrol Officer	Charles Humphrey	5 September 1907	Killed in cow stampede	
Patrol Officer	Lewis C. Hipple	23 June 1916	Shot and killed while attempting to detain two men	
Patrol Officer	Melvin W. Kepford	30 October 1918	Struck and killed by vehicle while directing traffic	
Patrol Officer	Cloyd L. Hearn	13 November 1934	Struck and killed by vehicle while on foot patrol	
Patrol Officer	Barry P. Karper	20 July 1963	Killed when patrol vehicle crashed while chasing stolen vehicle	
Patrol Officer	Joseph J. O'Shura	20 July 1963	Killed when patrol vehicle crashed while chasing stolen vehicle	
Detective Corporal	John Robert Christian Jr.	18 April 1978	Shot and killed by robbery suspect	

== See also ==
- List of law enforcement agencies in Pennsylvania
- Pennsylvania Capitol Police
- Harrisburg Bureau of Fire
