= Charles C. Davis =

American Civil War major

- Medal of Honor, 1862 – 1895 Army version
- Born: August 15, 1830; Harrisburg, Pennsylvania
- Died: January 20, 1909 (aged 78); Harrisburg, Pennsylvania
- Burial place: Harrisburg Cemetery
- Military career
- Allegiance: United States of America; Union
- Branch: United States Army; Union Army
- Service years: 1861 – 1864
- Rank: Major
- Commands: 7th Pennsylvania Cavalry
- Conflicts: American Civil War Battle of Hoover's Gap
- Awards: Medal of Honor

Charles C. Davis (August 15, 1830 – January 20, 1909) was a United States Army Medal of Honor recipient, honored for his actions in command of the 7th Pennsylvania Cavalry during the Battle of Hoover's Gap of the American Civil War.

== Biography ==
Davis was born in Harrisburg, Pennsylvania in August 1830. He joined the Army from Harrisburg in September 1861, and was discharged in September 1864. He is one of two recipients of the Civil War Medal of Honor from Dauphin County, Pennsylvania. He is interred at Harrisburg Cemetery.

== Army service during the Civil War ==
Davis attained the rank of major of the 7th Pennsylvania Cavalry in July 1863. He was present at the Battle of Hoover's Gap, the principal battle fought in the Tullahoma Campaign (also known as the Middle Tennessee Campaign), of the American Civil War. He received the Medal of Honor for his actions at Shelbyville, Tennessee on June 27, 1863. The citation read: Led one of the most desperate and successful charges of the war. Date of issue: June 1894.

== Medal of Honor citation ==
Rank and organization: Major, 7th Pennsylvania Cavalry. Place and date: At Shelbyville, Tenn., June 27, 1863. Entered service at: Harrisburg, Pa. Born: August 15, 1830, Harrisburg, Pa. Date of issue: June 14, 1894.

Citation:

Led one of the most desperate and successful charges of the war.

== See also ==
- List of Medal of Honor recipients
- List of American Civil War Medal of Honor recipients: A–F
