= Pennsylvania Capitol Police =

State capital law enforcement agency

- Common name: Pennsylvania Capitol Police
- Motto: "Courtesy, Professionalism, Dedication"

Agency overview
- Formed: March 26, 1895
- Annual budget: $17.5 million (FY 2024)

Jurisdictional structure
- Operations jurisdiction: United States
- Legal jurisdiction: Capitol Complex and state office buildings in Dauphin County, PA, and Scranton, Pennsylvania
- Specialist jurisdiction: Buildings and lands occupied or explicitly controlled by the institution and the institution's personnel, and public entering the buildings and precincts of the institution

Operational structure
- Overseen by: Pennsylvania Department of General Services
- Headquarters: 70E Capitol East Wing, Harrisburg, PA 17125
- Sworn members: 84
- Agency executive: Joseph Jacob, Superintendent

Website
- https://www.pa.gov/agencies/dgs/programs-and-services/capitol-police

The Pennsylvania Capitol Police is the law enforcement agency responsible for the Pennsylvania State Capitol Complex located in Harrisburg, Pennsylvania. The Pennsylvania Capitol Police is led by a Superintendent, and operates under the Pennsylvania Department of General Services. As of November 2024, the Pennsylvania Capitol Police employed 84 sworn law enforcement officers.

The Pennsylvania Capitol Police are responsible for investigating all crimes reported within the Pennsylvania State Capitol Complex, along with various state-owned buildings and properties. The Pennsylvania Capitol Police enforce the laws of the Commonwealth, protect state government personnel, and monitor demonstrations and protests within their jurisdiction. As of 2024, the Pennsylvania Capitol Police budget was $17,567,000. The budget for the Pennsylvania Capitol Police is allocated from the Pennsylvania Department of General Services.

The Pennsylvania State Capitol Police Force, maintaining a strong relationship with the Harrisburg Bureau of Police, was established on March 26, 1895, under Governor Daniel Hartman Hastings, the state's 21st Governor. The enactment authorized the Capitol Police as the first Pennsylvania police agency under Commonwealth jurisdiction and the second oldest state police organization in the United States, after the Texas Rangers.

== Accreditation ==
The Capitol Police was initially accredited on July 9, 2005 through the Pennsylvania Law Enforcement Accreditation Commission (PLEAC) and Pennsylvania Chiefs of Police Association. In 2024, the Pennsylvania Capitol Police received their sixth re-accreditation. In addition to being re-accredited, the Pennsylvania Capitol Police was awarded the Premier Agency Status by the PA Chiefs of Police.

The Capitol Police received International Accreditation on July 28, 2007, through the Commission on Accreditation for Law Enforcement Agencies (CALEA). In 2024, the Capitol Police was awarded their sixth award for being re-accredited. CALEA recognized the Pennsylvania Capitol Police for their professional excellence and demonstrating a commitment to being a highly trained police department.

== Equipment ==
The Capitol Police have an all-Ford patrol fleet that consists of Police Interceptor Sedans and the Police Interceptor Utility. The agency has both marked and unmarked vehicles. Some of the vehicles utilized by the Capitol Police are equipped with Vehicle-Mounted LPR (License Plate Reader) Systems.

Though not often displayed in pictures, the Capitol Police also uniquely use the IWI X95 Israeli bullpup assault rifle as part of their armament, and were previously the first law enforcement agency in the United States to adopt the TAVOR SAR in 2013 before upgrading to the IWI Tavor X95 in July 2017.

The Department has four K-9 Explosive Units trained in the detection of explosives. All delivery vehicles entering the building of the Capital Complex are searched. Also, the Capitol Police Department has a K-9 Narcotics/Patrol unit trained in the detection of drugs on as well as for search and rescue operations.

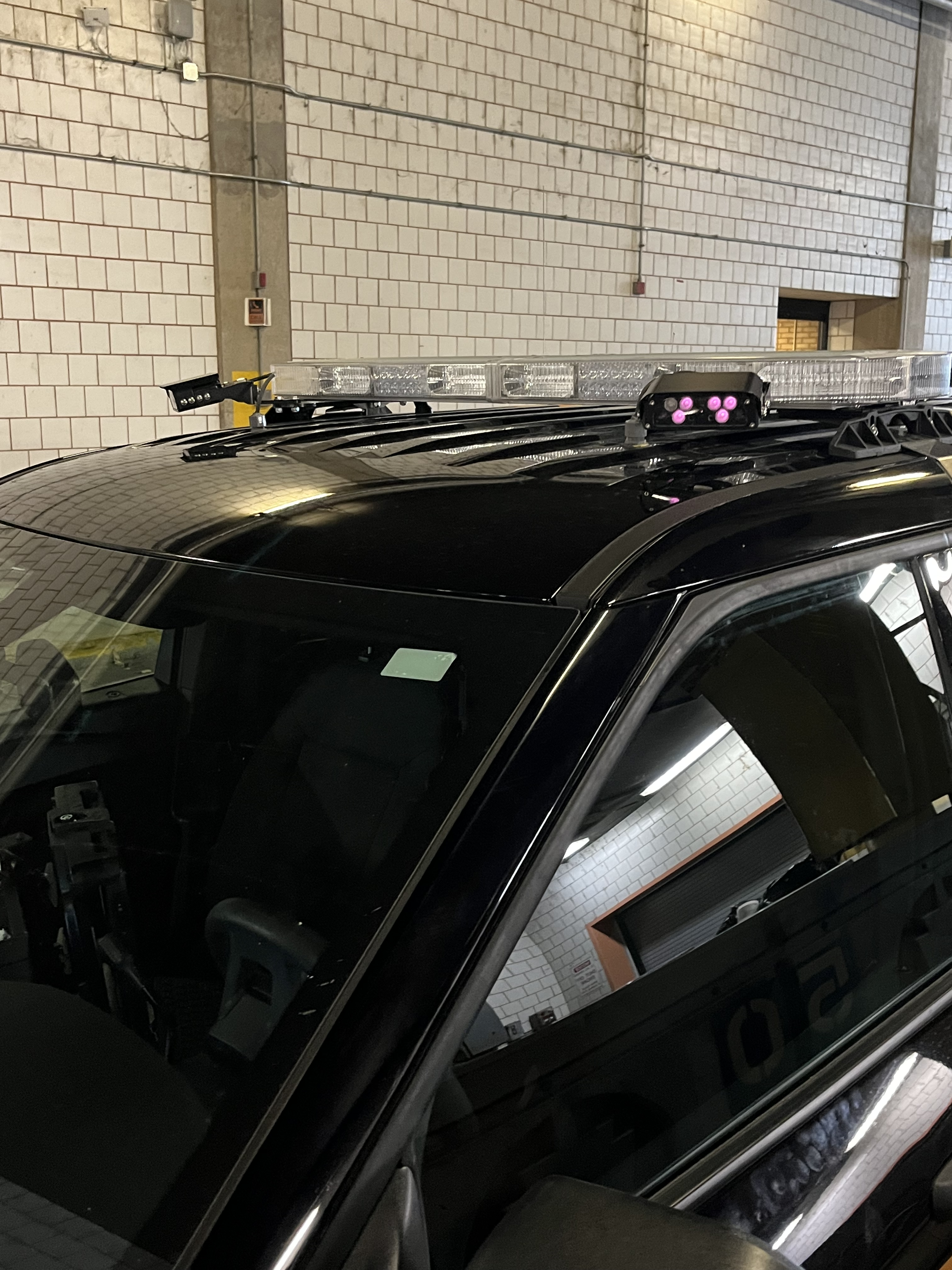
License Plate Reader used by the PCD.

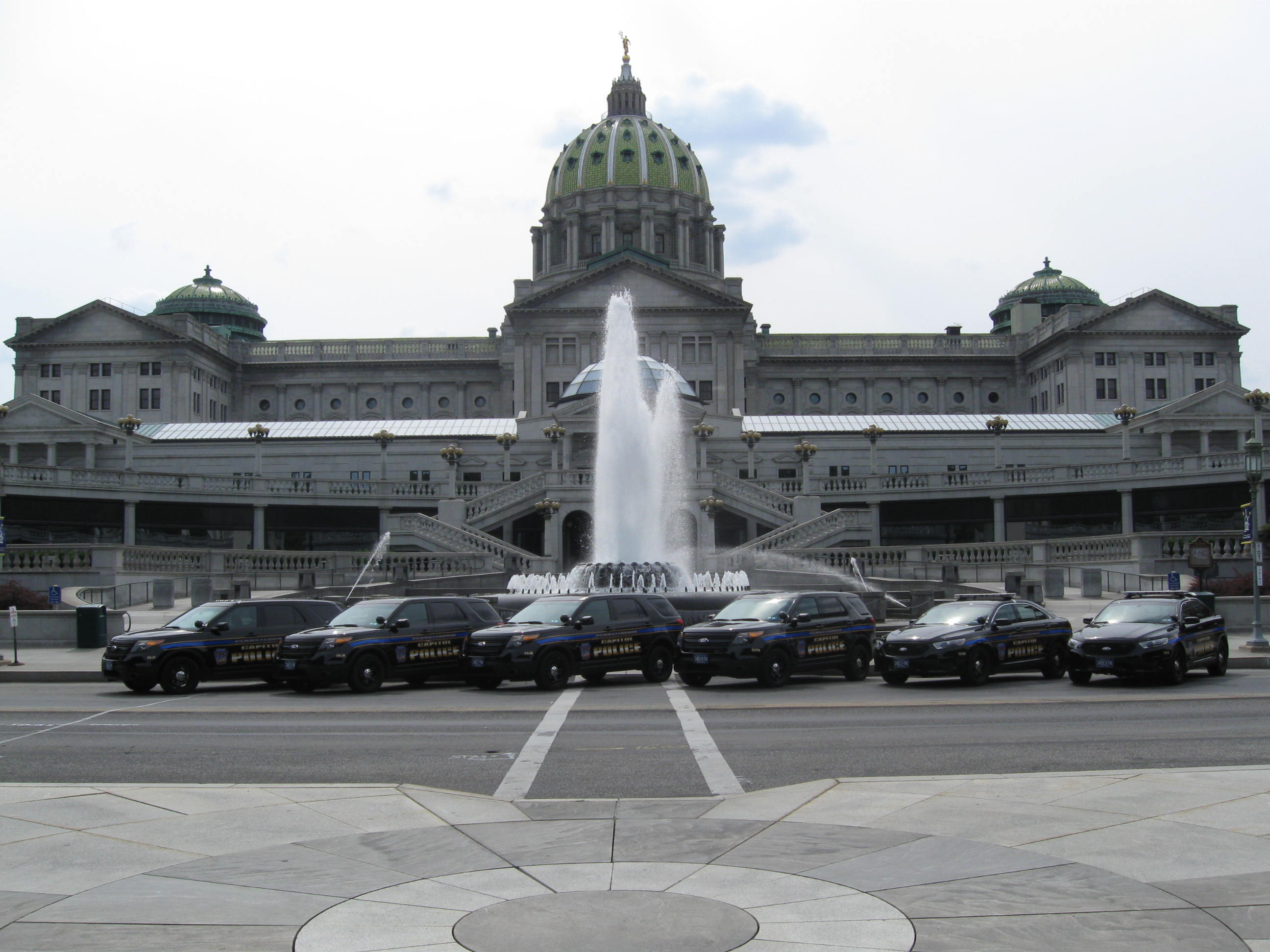
Fleet of PCD vehicles.

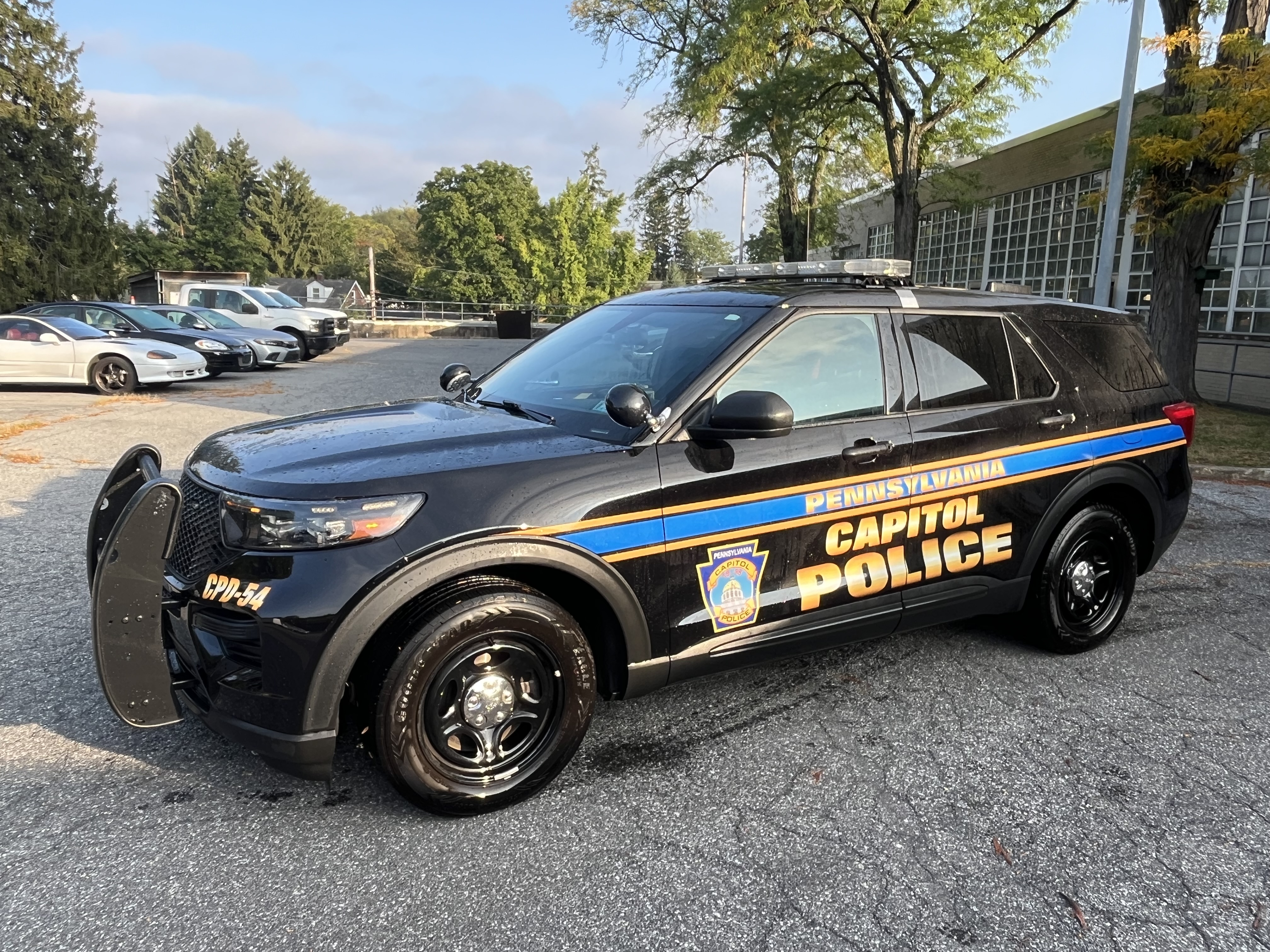
PCD Police Vehicle.

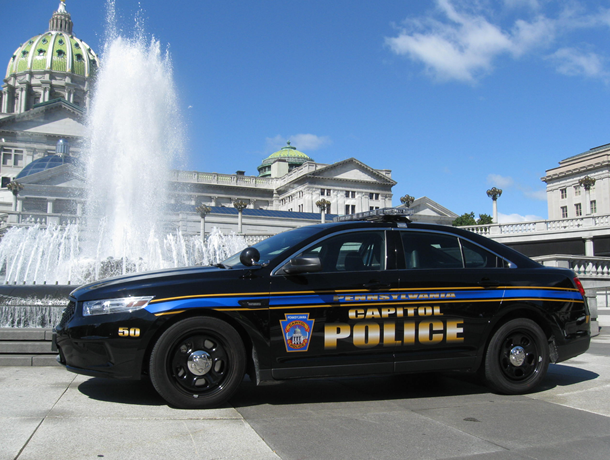
PCD Police Vehicle.

== Special Units ==
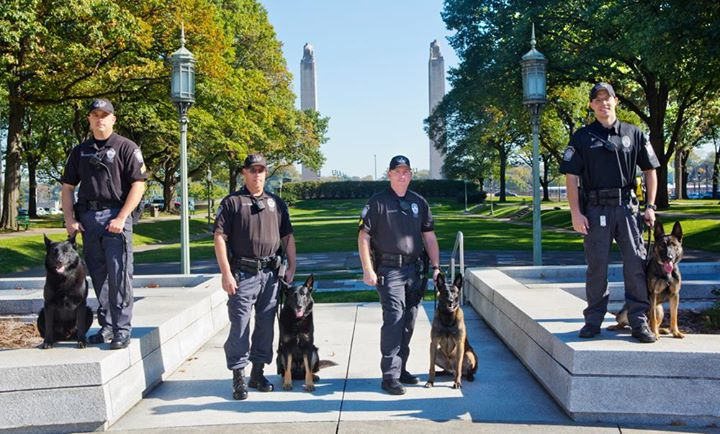
K-9 Officers and K-9's from the PA Capitol Police.

The Pennsylvania Capitol Police conduct both patrol and investigatory work on the grounds of the Pennsylvania State Capitol. Six special units operate within the department.

- K-9's (Explosive and Narcotics Detection)
- Bike Patrol
- Ceremonial Unit
- Drone Unit
- Special Response Team (SRT)
- Field Force Unit

== Rank structure and insignia ==
Title	Insignia
Superintendent	Two stars
Deputy Superintendent	One star
Lieutenant	One bar
Sergeant	Three chevrons
Corporal	Two chevrons
Officer	No insignia

== See also ==
- List of law enforcement agencies in Pennsylvania
- Capitol Police
