= Harrisburg Bureau of Fire =

Fire department in Harrisburg, Pennsylvania, US

- Official Logo

Operational area
- Country: United States
- U.S. State: Pennsylvania
- County: Dauphin
- City: Harrisburg

Agency overview
- Established: 1791; 234 years ago
- Employees: 96 (2023)
- Annual budget: 10.4 million (2023)
- Staffing: Combination career and volunteer
- Fire chief: Brian Enterline
- Senior Deputy Fire Chief: Michael Souder
- Deputy Fire Chief: Glenn Sattizahn
- IAFF: 428

Facilities and equipment
- Battalions: 2
- Stations: 3
- Engines: 3
- Trucks: 3
- Squads: 1
- Rescues: 4
- HAZMAT: 1
- Wildland: 1
- Fireboats: 1
- Rescue boats: 3

Website
- Official Website
- IAFF Website

Harrisburg Bureau of Fire (HBF) is a firefighting agency that is located in and serves Harrisburg, Pennsylvania, and its surrounding metropolitan area. It is a career firefighting agency with at least 15 firefighters and fire officers on duty at any given time, supplemented with volunteer staffing as well. Everyday duties for the Bureau include fire suppression, emergency medical services, tactical rescue, urban search and rescue, water rescue, hazardous materials response, fire prevention, fire codes enforcement, and public safety educations.

== History ==
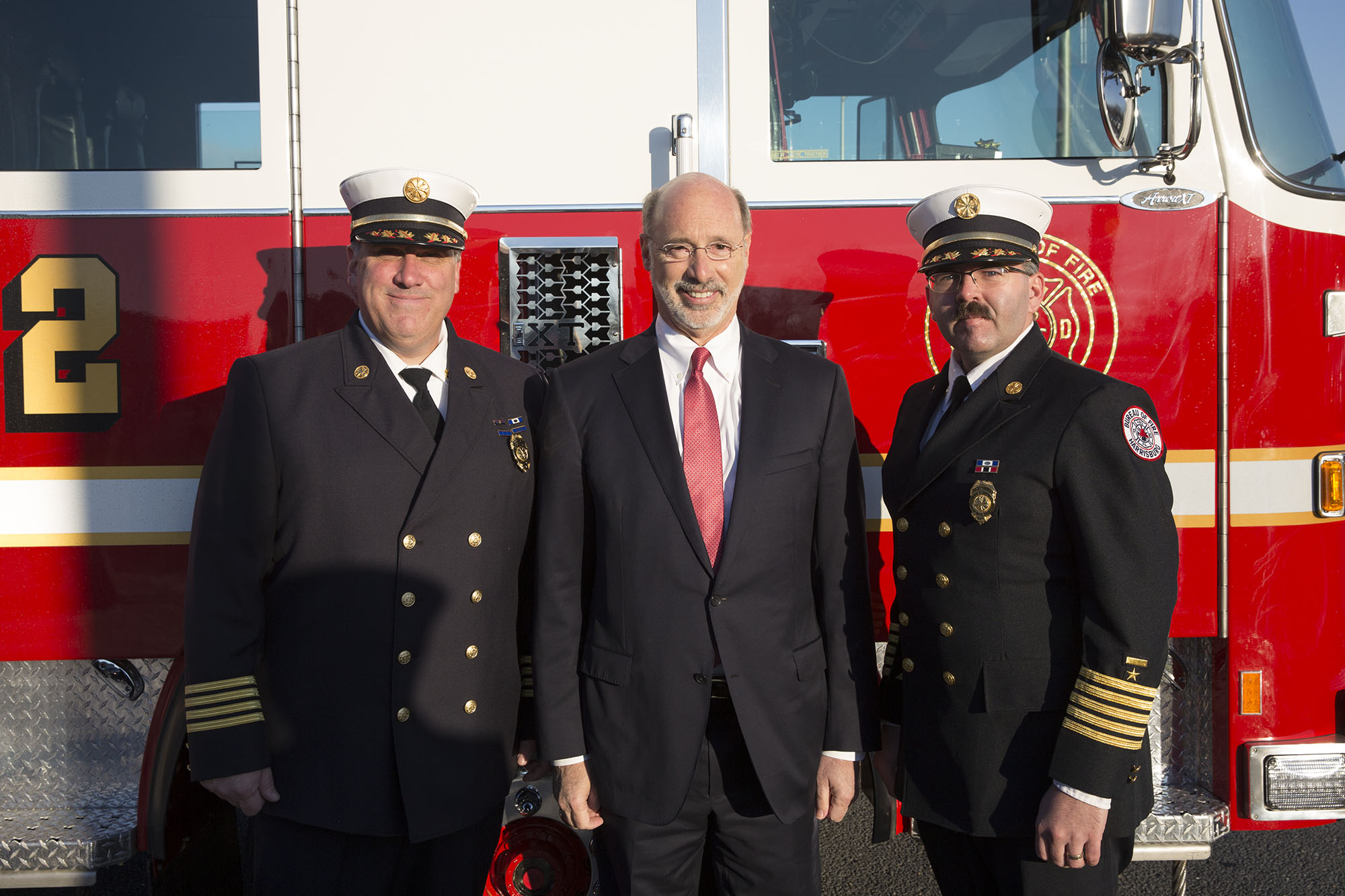
PA Governor Tom Wolf (center) with Fire Chief Brian Enterline (right) and Senior Deputy Fire Chief Michael Souder(left)

As Harrisburg became a Borough in 1791, a volunteer bucket brigade was established as the Union Fire Company, and several other temporary ones existed throughout the 19th century. The first hose companies with carriages were formed in 1841 following the installation of the city's water system, initially with the Washington Hose Company. On December 1, 1913 following the passing of Clark Act to restructure Pennsylvania cities, the Bureau was named so under the Department of Public Safety (headed by the Mayor). Despite this technicality, it is not uncommon to hear "Harrisburg Fire Department" instead of "Bureau." In 2018, the city approved a budget of 10.1 million dollars, along with a Future of Fire report stating the need for updated equipment and apparatuses in the next 10 years. In January 2019, the city announced its plan to purchase 12 new pieces of apparatus from 2020 through 2035.

== Operations ==
=== Specialty units ===
- HAZMAT unit; the HBF is the home station for Hazmat 77 which is housed at Station 1. HAZMAT 77 was recently moved to Dauphin county hazmat teams new station and the team moved HAZMAT 77-3 to station 1. Hazmat 77 is a part of the Dauphin County Hazmat team.
- Urban search and rescue unit; Harrisburg is mostly urban with small patches of wooded areas and parks throughout. In 1983 the HBF formed an urban search and rescue unit with two Ford F-350 marked trucks. This team is made up of numerous department employees as well as dozens of civilian volunteers.
- Marine rescue unit; the marine rescue unit is make up of one fireboat and three smaller rescue boats. Due to Harrisburg's proximity to the Susquehanna River the HBF often respond to emergencies in the water. Majority of which include missing swimmers/sportsmen and vehicles which entered the water. This unit is made up of department volunteers and is located at station 8 due to its proximity to the waterfront. The marine unit can respond anywhere along the cities waterfront within 15 minutes of a call.

=== Stations and apparatus ===
- Station 1: 1820 N. 6th Street
- Station 2: 140 N. 16th Street
- Station 8: 9 S. 13th Street
- Department of Public Safety HQ/de facto Station 4: 123 Walnut Street (Vance C. McCormick Public Service Center)

The Bureau has over 30 apparatuses, trucks, and vans. The HBF fleet contains Pierce and Seagrave firefighting apparatus and Freightliner ambulances. The truck and SUV brands used by the department include Ford and Chevrolet.

== Fallen firefighters ==
Rank	Name	Last Alarm	Badge	Age	Description
Captain	Samuel J. Miller	May 13, 1859	Unknown	21	Fell and was run over by hand pumper
Fireman	George Hotcorn	December 19, 1874	Unknown	Unknown	Succumbed to injuries sustained due to fall and being run over by hand pumper
Fireman	Maximillian Grieshaber	July 31, 1880	Unknown	27	After developing a cold during 36-hour exposure to fire in December 1878, succumbed to Pneumonia
Fireman	William C. Fisher	March 28, 1899	Unknown	40	Electrocuted investigating an electrical fire
Fireman	Charles F. Deiker	April 19, 1901	Unknown	Unknown	Ruptured intestine while cranking hose reel following structure fire
Fireman	Eli K. Hoffman	May 13, 1908	Unknown	31	Electrocuted at fire on S 18th Street
Fireman	William H. Benner	August 15, 1909	Unknown	Unknown	Succumbed to injuries sustained due to fall from scaffolding inside Fire House while scraping paint
Fireman	H. Howard May	September 10, 1912	Unknown	Unknown	Succumbed to Pneumonia after being drenched working a hose on a fire Christmas Eve 1911
Driver	Samuel Wanbaugh	November 21, 1912	Unknown	45	Killed in an accident at 15th & Market Street responding to scene
Fireman	William H. Harris	April 8, 1914	Unknown	56	Collapsed from a heart attack while fighting an industrial fire
Fireman	Thomas A. Wenrick	September 3, 1919	Unknown	45	Succumbed to Tuberculosis after a prolonged heavy cold from manning a hose for hours during a fire
Fireman	Charles A. Filmore	June 11, 1921	Unknown	Unknown	Killed in collision with streetcar while riding on running board of pumper
Fireman	Daniel P. Huber	November 26, 1922	Unknown	Unknown	Inhaled superheated gases while trapped at a general alarm fire at 14th & Howard Street
Fire Chief	Marion Verbeke	October 29, 1926	Unknown	64	Succumbed to Bright's disease after inhaling chemical laden smoke while directing a fire (Son of William K. Verbeke)
Fireman	Bernard E. Goodyear	May 7, 1927	Unknown	29	Smoke inhalation from a large industrial fire
Fire Chief	Edward Halbert	March 11, 1935	Unknown	58	Succumbed to injuries from three-story fall while surveying a fire
Driver	William Metzger	June 1, 1941	Unknown	28	Struck by a fast moving car while on scene
Fireman	Donald Henery	August 22, 1953	Unknown	26	Killed under collapsed wall of large industrial fire
Fireman	William F. Barbush	May 10, 1968	90	41	Collapsed on duty as a radio dispatcher
Fireman	William Corish	June 13, 1978	15	51	Succumbed to injuries after being suddenly pinned to a wall by a stalled car he was trying to free
Lieutenant	Dennis H. DeVoe	March 11, 2017	401	45	Killed in accident when responding to scene

== See also ==
- List of fire departments
- List of Pennsylvania fire departments
- Firefighting
