= Jacob D. Boas =

American politician

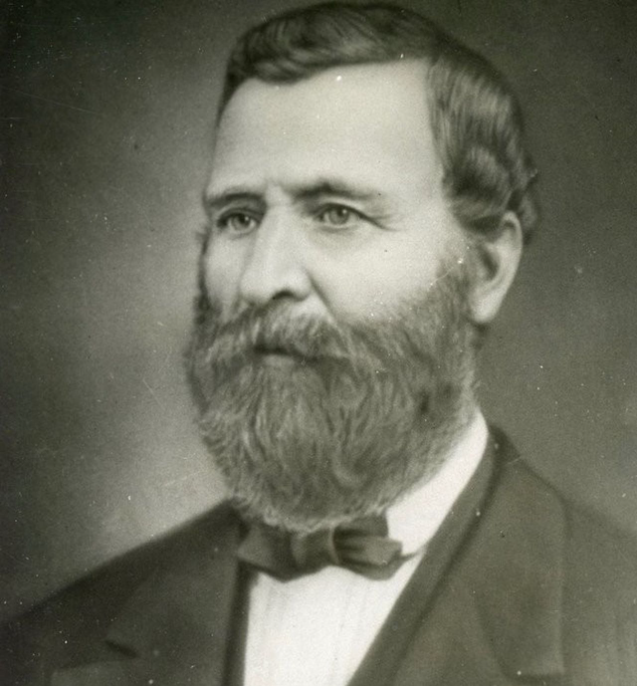

Mayor of Harrisburg
- In office 1873–1875
- Preceded by: William K. Verbeke
- Succeeded by: John D. Patterson

Pennsylvania State Senate, 9th district
- In office 1847–1849
- Preceded by: Jefferson Kreider Heckman
- Succeeded by: Conrad Schilp Shimer

Personal details
- Born: Jacob Dick Boas; October 5, 1806 Harrisburg, Pennsylvania, U.S.
- Died: March 25, 1887 (80 years old)
- Resting place: Harrisburg Cemetery
- Party: Whig, later Republican
- Spouse(s): Elizabeth Seiler (m. 1831), Emeline Yeakel Krause (m. 1873)
- Children: Sarah Elizabeth Boas, Charles Augustus Boas (b. 1835)
- Relatives: William Dick Boas (brother, also politician)
- Education: Apprenticeship

Jacob Dick Boas (October 5, 1806 – March 25, 1887) was an American businessman and politician who served as a member of the Pennsylvania State Senate and Mayor of Harrisburg, Pennsylvania.

== Early life ==
Born to Jacob and Sarah (Dick) Boas, his father was a merchant businessman, borough councilman and prothonotary of Dauphin County appointed by Governor Simon Snyder. Upon his father's death on October 8, 1815, Jacob moved to live with his uncle Jacob Levan in Kutztown, Pennsylvania. At 15, he trained as a hatter, then worked as a journeyman through western Pennsylvania and Ohio until 1831, when he moved to Allentown, Pennsylvania to begin his own hat business.

== Politics ==
While in Allentown, Boas became the Town Clerk in 1835 and served on the Town Council in 1836. In 1840, he was elected to the Treasurer of Lehigh County for a term of 3 years. Boas then served as a State Senator in the 9th district from 1847 to 1849 as a member of the Whig Party.

In 1850, he permanently moved back to Harrisburg and established the Boas & Newhard, Watchmakers and Jewelers business with watchmaker J. F. Newhard. Boas eventually bought out Newhard's share and passed the business on to his son Charles. It was at this point Boas started worked as a freight forwarder with a Mr. Forster until he was elected to the position of Dauphin County Sheriff on November 14, 1860, for 3 years. In 1868, he was appointed as a United States gauger for the Internal Revenue Service, which he held until he was elected and served as Mayor of Harrisburg from 1873 to 1875 under the Republican Party. On the Inauguration Day of Governor James A. Beaver in 1887, Boas contracted a severe cold, and, after two months, succumbed to the illness, dying on March 25, 1887.

Political offices
Preceded by William K. Verbeke	Mayor of Harrisburg, Pennsylvania; 1873–1875	Succeeded by John D. Patterson
