= List of mayors of Harrisburg, Pennsylvania =

Mayor of Harrisburg
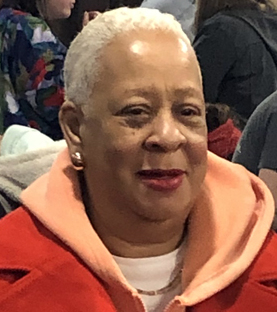
- Incumbent; Wanda Williams since January 3, 2022
- Term length: Four years
- Inaugural holder: William H. Kepner
- Formation: 1860
- Website: Office of the Mayor

This list of mayors of Harrisburg, Pennsylvania is sorted chronologically, by default. The current mayor, since January 2022, is Democrat Wanda Williams.

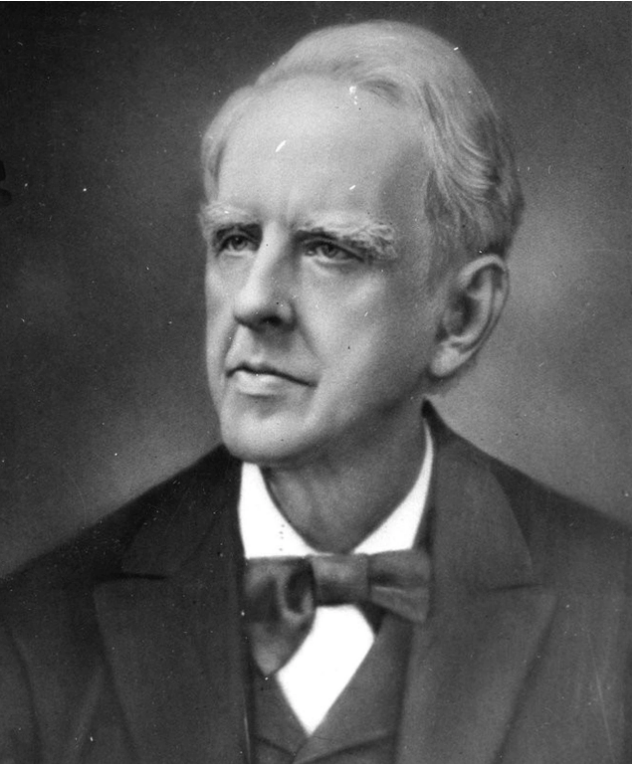
Mayor William K. Verbeke

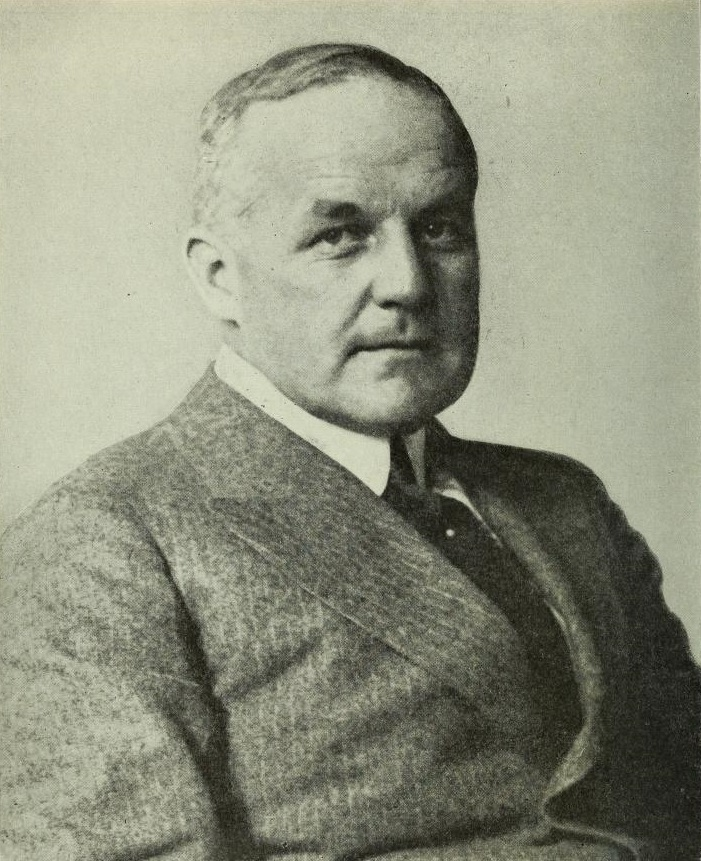
Mayor Vance C. McCormick

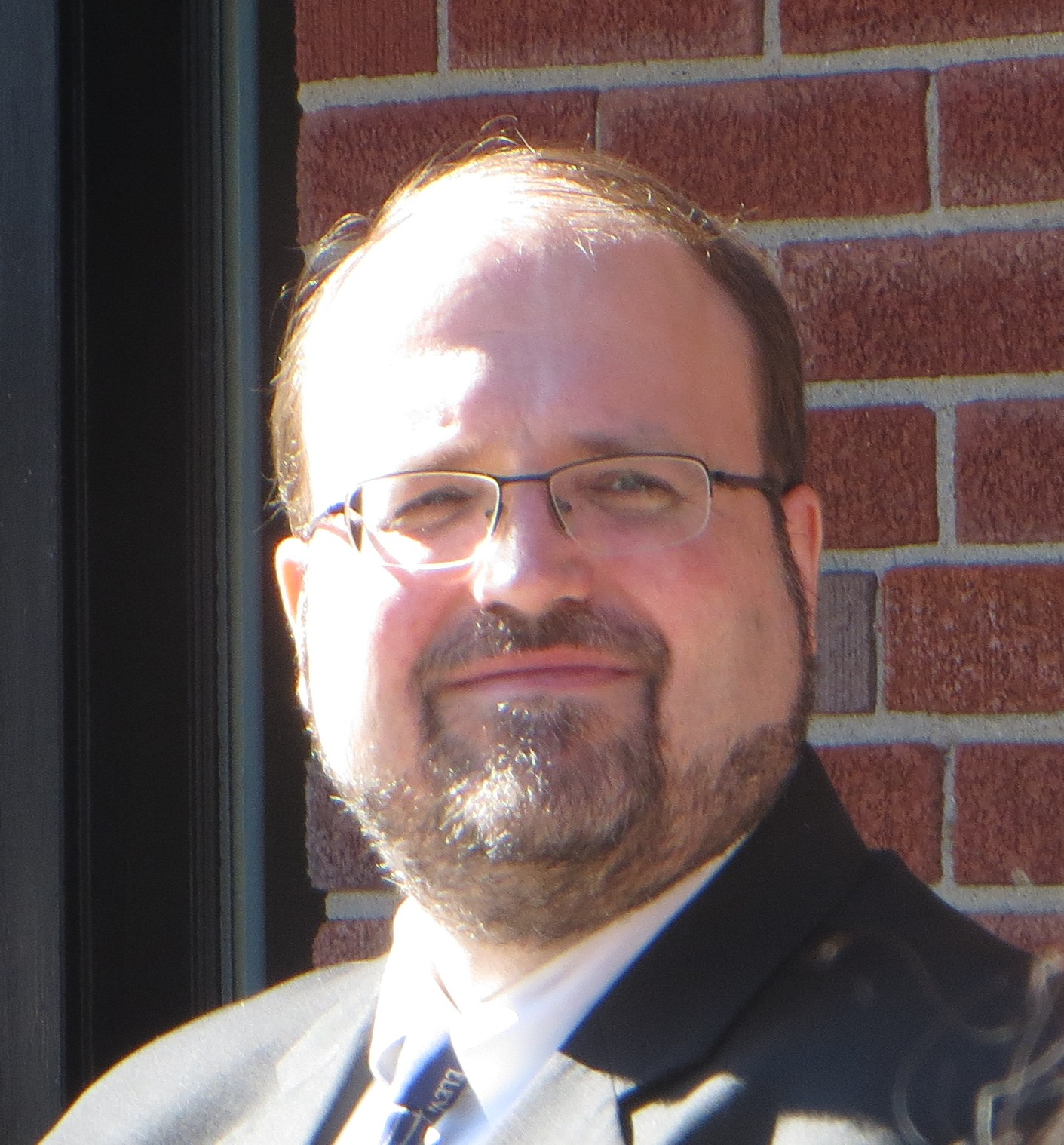
Mayor Eric Papenfuse

Mayor	Term	Political party	Notes
William H. Kepner	Apr 20, 1860 – Mar 27, 1863	Democratic	
Augustus L. Roumfort	Mar 27, 1863 – Mar 23, 1866	Democratic	
Oliver Edwards	Mar 23, 1866 – Jan 11, 1869	Democratic	
William W. Hays	Jan 11, 1869 – Mar, 1870	Republican	Died in office.
George B. Cole	Apr 4, 1870 – Jan 9, 1871	Republican	
William K. Verbeke	Jan 9, 1871 – Jan 13, 1873	Democratic	
Jacob D. Boas	Jan 13, 1873 – Jan 11, 1875	Republican	
John D. Patterson	Jan 11, 1875 – Jan 8, 1881	Republican	Resigned.
John Crull Herman (Note: John C. Herman was given the middle name of "Crull" because that was his grandmother's surname. It was also a means to preserve a surname with an ancient heritage. Already his cousins—the Crull Blymer twins—had it as their middle names for preservation purposes. Because the "Crull Blymer" twins had gone to Phillips Exeter Academy (Class of 1872) and then destined for Harvard College (Class of 1876), John Crull Herman was sent to Yale College. His son, John Crull Herman also attended Yale (Class of 1915) and was a member of Wolf's Head; and his grandson John Crull Herman III graduated from Yale in 1939 where he, too, was a member of Wolf's Head. He also later taught at the Yale School of Architecture)	Jan 8, 1881 – Apr 2, 1883	Republican	
Simon Cameron Wilson	Apr 2, 1883 – 1886	Republican	Died in office.
Samuel W. Fleming Sr.	1886–1887	Republican	
John A. Fritchey	1887–1893	Democratic	
Maurice C. Eby	1893–1896	Republican	
John D. Patterson	1896–1899	Republican	
John A. Fritchey	1899–1902	Democratic	
Vance C. McCormick	1902–1905	Democratic	
Edward Z. Gross	1905–1908	Republican	
Ezra S. Meals, M.D.	1908–1912	Republican	
John K. Royal	1912–1916	Democratic	
Ezra S. Meals, M.D.	1916 – April 18, 1917	Republican	Died in office.
William L. Gorgas	Apr 18, 1917 – May 15, 1917	Democratic	Named acting mayor following Dr. Meals' death.
Charles A. Miller	May 15, 1917 – July 12, 1917	Republican	Died in office.
William L. Gorgas	Jul 12, 1917 – Sep 24, 1917	Democratic	Named acting mayor following Miller's death.
J. William Bowman	Sep 24, 1917 – Nov 27, 1917	Republican	Appointed for six weeks' time and retired from office.
Daniel L. Keister	Nov 27, 1917 – Jan 5, 1920	Republican	
George A. Hoverter	Jan 5, 1920 – Jan 6, 1936	Republican	
John A. F. Hall	Jan 6, 1936 – Jan 1, 1940	Republican	
Howard E. Milliken, M.D.	Jan 1, 1940 – Jan 5, 1948	Republican	
Claude R. Robins	Jan 5, 1948 – Jan 2, 1956	Republican	
Nolan F. Ziegler	Jan 2, 1956 – Mar 7, 1963	Republican	Died in office.
Daniel J. Barry	Mar 26, 1963 – Jan 6, 1964	Republican	
William K. McBride	Jan 6, 1964 – Jan 1, 1968	Republican	
Albert H. Straub	Jan 1, 1968 – Jan 5, 1970	Republican	
Harold A. Swenson	Jan 5, 1970 – Jan 1, 1978	Democratic	First "strong" mayor after switch to strong mayor variation of Mayor–council government.
Paul E. "Tim" Doutrich, Jr.	Jan 3, 1978 – Jan 5, 1982	Republican	
Stephen R. Reed	Jan 5, 1982 – Jan 4, 2010	Democratic	Defeated for renomination in 2009.
Linda D. Thompson	Jan 4, 2010 – Jan 6, 2014	Democratic	Defeated for renomination in 2013; first female and first black mayor.
Eric R. Papenfuse	Jan 6, 2014 – Jan 3, 2022	Democratic	Reelected November 2017; defeated for renomination and lost write-in campaign in November 2021.
Wanda R. D. Williams	Jan 3, 2022 – present (Note: Williams temporarily transferred power to Police Commissioner Thomas Carter on July 31, 2022 due to a medical procedure; Carter served as acting mayor until August 16, 2022.)	Democratic	

== See also ==
- Harrisburg City Council
- Timeline of Harrisburg, Pennsylvania history
