= David P. Reese Jr. =

American politician (1905–1962)

Member of the Pennsylvania House of Representatives from the Dauphin County district
- In office 1939–1948

Personal details
- Born: November 17, 1905 Plymouth, Pennsylvania, U.S.
- Died: July 19, 1962 (aged 56) Harrisburg, Pennsylvania, U.S.
- Resting place: Harrisburg Cemetery
- Party: Republican
- Spouse: Gertrude McDevitt (m. 1936)
- Parent: David P. Reese (father)
- Education: University of Virginia (BS); Dickinson College School of Law (LLB)
- Occupation: Politician; lawyer

David P. Reese Jr. (November 17, 1905 – July 19, 1962) was an American politician and lawyer from Pennsylvania. He served in Pennsylvania House of Representatives from 1939 to 1948.

== Early life ==
David P. Reese Jr. was born on November 17, 1905, in Plymouth, Pennsylvania, to Ellen T. and David P. Reese. He attended schools in Plymouth, Wyoming Seminary and Harrisburg Academy. He graduated with a Bachelor of Science in the University of Virginia and a Bachelor of Laws from Dickinson College School of Law.

== Career ==
After graduating law school, Reese was in the taxing office of the Pennsylvania Department of Revenue. He was an attorney and counselor-at-law. He was elected as a Republican to the Pennsylvania House of Representatives, representing Dauphin County from 1939 to 1948. He was chair of the joint state government commission sub-committee on unemployment compensation from 1945 to 1946. He was chair of the legislative committee on unemployment compensation from 1947 to 1948. He was chair of the joint legislative committee on uniform practice and procedure from 1947 to 1948. During World War II, he was chairman of the Dauphin County Ration Board.

Reese also worked as a lobbyist for Anthracite Institute. He was a director of the Pennsylvania National Horse Show Association. He was trustee and secretary of Harrisburg Academy.

== Personal life ==
Reese married Gertrude McDevitt, daughter of William H. McDevitt, of Harrisburg on November 21, 1936. He was a member of the Harrisburg Country Club, Union League of Philadelphia, Westmoreland Club, Farmington Country Club, Pennsylvania Society and the American Bar Association.

Reese died on July 19, 1962, at his home on Front Street in Harrisburg. He was buried in Harrisburg Cemetery.
