= David P. Reese =

American politician and lawyer (1871–1935)

Member of the Pennsylvania House of Representatives from the Luzerne County district
- In office 1905–1906

Personal details
- Born: David Philip Reese; March 29, 1871 Taylor, Pennsylvania, U.S.
- Died: April 16, 1935 (aged 64) Harrisburg, Pennsylvania, U.S.
- Resting place: St. John's Cemetery; Shiremanstown, Pennsylvania, U.S.
- Party: Republican
- Spouse: Ellen T.
- Children: 2, including David
- Education: Ohio Normal University
- Occupation: Politician; lawyer

David Philip Reese (March 29, 1871 – April 16, 1935) was an American politician and lawyer from Pennsylvania. He served in the Pennsylvania House of Representatives from 1905 to 1906.

== Early life ==
David Philip Reese was born on March 29, 1871, in Taylor, Pennsylvania. He graduated from Wyoming Seminary in Kingston. He graduated from Ohio Normal University.

== Career ==
Reese was a lawyer and was elected solicitor of Plymouth and served in 1901, 1902 and 1904. In 1907, he began working as a corporate lawyer in Harrisburg. He represented railroads and utilities in legislative affairs.

Reese was elected as a Republican to the Pennsylvania House of Representatives, representing Luzerne County from 1905 to 1906. He ran unsuccessfully for re-election in 1906.

== Personal life ==
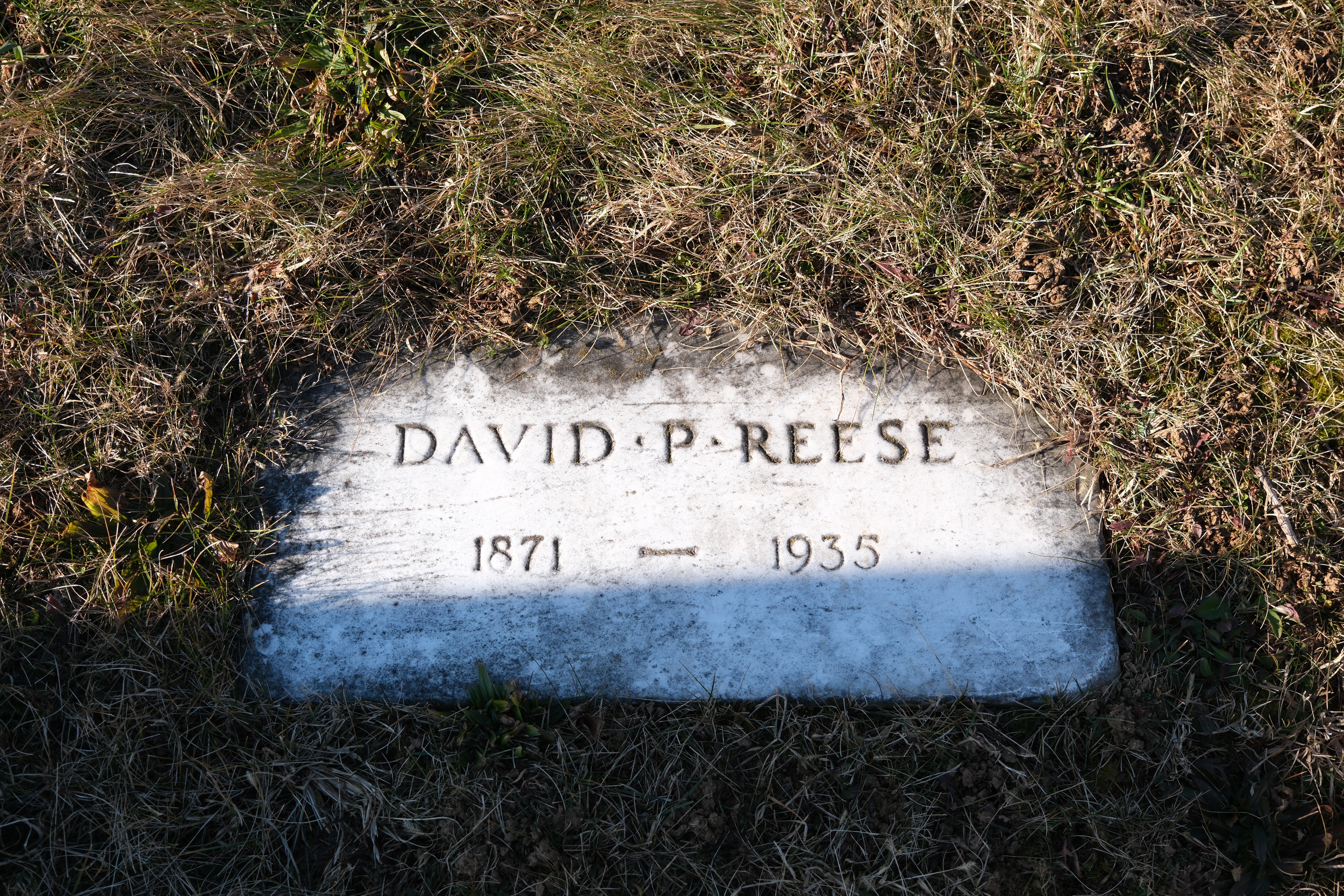
Grave of Reese in St. John's Cemetery

Reese married Ellen T. They had a son and daughter, David P. Jr. and Catherine. His son David was also a state representative. He was a member of St. Stephens Episcopal Cathedral.

Reese died of pneumonia on April 16, 1935, at his home on Front Street in Harrisburg. He was buried in St. John's Cemetery in Shiremanstown.
