= 7th Pennsylvania Cavalry Regiment =

Union Army cavalry regiment

7th Pennsylvania Volunteer Cavalry
- Active: September 1861 to August 13, 1865
- Country: United States
- Allegiance: Union
- Branch: Cavalry
- Nickname: 80th Regiment
- Engagements: Battle of Perryville; Battle of Stones River; Tullahoma Campaign; Battle of Hoover's Gap; Battle of Chickamauga; Battle of Resaca; Siege of Atlanta; Battle of Ladiga

The 7th Pennsylvania Cavalry Regiment was a cavalry regiment that served in the Union Army during the American Civil War. The unit was frequently referred to as "80th Regiment".

== Service ==
The 7th Pennsylvania Cavalry was organized at Camp Cameron in Harrisburg, Pennsylvania, September through December 1861 and mustered in for a two-year enlistment on December 19, 1861, under the command of Colonel George C. Wynkoop. The regiment was recruited in Allegheny, Berks, Bradford, Centre, Chester, Clinton, Cumberland, Dauphin, Luzerne, Lycoming, Montour, Northumberland, Schuylkill and Tioga counties.

The regiment served unattached, Army of the Ohio, to March 1862. Negley's 7th Independent Brigade, Army of the Ohio (1st Battalion). Post of Nashville, Tennessee, Department of Ohio (2nd Battalion). 23rd Independent Brigade, Army of the Ohio (3rd Battalion), to September 1862. Cavalry, 8th Division, Army of the Ohio (1st and 2nd Battalions), Unattached, Army of the Ohio (3rd Battalion), to November 1862. 1st Brigade, Cavalry Division, Army of the Ohio, to January 1863. 1st Brigade, 2nd Division, Cavalry Corps, Army of the Cumberland, to November 1864. 2nd Brigade, 2nd Division, Cavalry Corps, Military Division Mississippi, to July 1865.

The 7th Pennsylvania Cavalry mustered out of service at Nashville, Tennessee, on August 13, 1865.

== Detailed service ==
Moved to Louisville, Ky., December 19, and ordered to Jeffersonville, Ind. Duty there until February 1862. 1st Battalion (Companies A, D, H, and I) sent to Columbia, Tenn. Expedition to Rodgersville May 13–14. Lamb's Ferry, Ala., May 14. Advance on Chattanooga June 1. Sweeden's Cove June 4. Chattanooga June 7–8. Occupation of Manchester July 1. Paris July 19. Raid on Louisville & Nashville Railroad August 19–23. Huntsville Road, near Gallatin, August 21. Brentwood September 19–20. Near Perryville October 6–7. Battle of Perryville, October 8. Expedition from Crab Orchard to Big Hill and Richmond October 21. 2nd Battalion (Companies C, E, F, and K), under Gen. Dumont, in garrison at Nashville, Tenn., and scouting in that vicinity until November. 3rd Battalion (Companies B, G, L, and M), in Duffield's Command, scouting in western and middle Tennessee. Lebanon and pursuit to Carthage May 5. Readyville June 7. Murfreesboro July 18. Sparta August 4–5 and 7. Regiment reunited in November 1862. Nashville November 5. Reconnaissance from Nashville to Franklin December 11–12. Wilson's Creek Pike December 11. Franklin December 12. Neal, Nashville December 24. Advance on Murfreesboro December 26–30. Lavergne December 26–27. Battle of Stones River December 30–31, 1862 and January 1–3, 1863. Overall's Creek December 31. Manchester Pike and Lytle's Creek January 5, 1863. Expedition to Franklin January 31-February 13. Unionville and Rover January 31. Murfreesboro February 7. Rover February 13. Expedition toward Columbia March 4–14. Unionville and Rover March 4. Chapel Hill March 5. Thompson's Station March 9. Rutherford Creek March 10–11. Snow Hill, Woodbury, April 3. Franklin April 10. Expedition to McMinnville April 20–30. Middletown May 21–22. Near Murfreesboro June 3. Operations on Edgeville Pike June 4. Marshall Knob June 4. Shelbyville Pike June 4. Scout on Middleton and Eagleville Pike June 10. Scout on Manchester Pike June 13. Expedition to Lebanon June 15–17. Lebanon June 16. Tullahoma Campaign June 23-July 7. Guy's Gap or Fosterville and capture of Shelbyville June 27. Expedition to Huntsville July 13–22. Reconnaissance to Rock Island Ferry August 4–5. Sparta August 9. Passage of Cumberland Mountains and Tennessee River, and Chickamauga Campaign August 16-September 22. Calfkiller River, Sparta, August 17. Battle of Chickamauga September 19–20. Rossville, Ga., September 21. Reenlisted at Huntsville, Ala., November 28, 1863. Atlanta Campaign May to September 1864. Demonstration on Rocky Faced Ridge May 8–11. Battle of Resaca May 14–15. Tanner's Bridge and Rome May 15. Near Dallas May 24. Operations on line of Pumpkin Vine Creek and battles about Dallas, New Hope Church and Allatoona Hills May 25-June 5. Near Big Shanty June 9. Operations about Marietta and against Kennesaw Mountain June 10-July 2. McAffee's Cross Roads June 11. Powder Springs June 20. Noonday Creek June 27. Line of Nickajack Creek July 2–5. Rottenwood Creek July 4. Rossville Ferry July 5. Line of the Chattahoochie July 6–17. Garrard's Raid on Covington July 22–24. Siege of Atlanta July 22-August 25. Garrard's Raid to South River July 27–31. Flat Rock Bridge July 28. Kilpatrick's Raid around Atlanta August 18–22. Flint River and Jonesborough August 19. Red Oak August 19. Lovejoy's Station August 20. Operations at Chattahoochie River Bridge August 26-September 2. Operations in northern Georgia and northern Alabama against Hood September 29-November 3. Carter Creek Station October 1. Near Columbia October 2. Near Lost Mountain October 4–7. New Hope Church October 5. Dallas October 7. Rome October 10–11. Narrows October 11. Coosaville Road, near Rome, October 13. Near Summerville October 18. Little River, Ala., October 20. Leesburg October 21. Ladiga, Terrapin Creek, October 28. Ordered to Louisville, Ky., to refit; duty there until December 28. March to Nashville, Tenn., December 28-January 8, 1865, thence to Gravelly Springs, Ala., January 25, and duty there until March. Wilson's Raid to Selma, Ala., and Macon, Ga., March 22-April 24. Selma April 2. Occupation of Montgomery April 12. Occupation of Macon April 20. Duty in Georgia and at Nashville, Tenn., until August.

== Casualties ==
The regiment lost a total of 292 men during service; 8 officers and 94 enlisted men killed or mortally wounded, 5 officers and 185 enlisted men died of disease.

== Commanders ==
- Colonel George C. Wynkoop - discharged June 25, 1863, due to disability
- Colonel William B. Sipes - promoted to colonel July 26, 1863; resigned November 30, 1864
- Colonel Charles Comly McCormick - promoted to colonel January 10, 1865
- Lieutenant Colonel James J. Seibert - commanded at the battle of Chickamauga
- Major John E. Wynkoop - commanded 1st Battalion at the battle of Perryville and regiment at the battle of Stones River

== Notable members ==
- Captain Charles C. Davis, Company I - Medal of Honor recipient, for action at Hoover's Gap

== See also ==
- List of Pennsylvania Civil War regiments
- Pennsylvania in the Civil War
