= Harold A. Swenson =

American politician

Mayor of Harrisburg
- In office 1970–1978
- Preceded by: Albert H. Straub
- Succeeded by: Paul E. Doutrich, Jr

Personal details
- Born: Harold A. Swenson; October 24, 1927 New York, U.S.
- Died: March 15, 1995 (aged 67)
- Party: Democratic
- Spouse: Elsie W. Swenson
- Education: Syracuse University

Harold A. Swenson (October 24, 1927 – March 15, 1995) was an American businessman, philanthropist, airman with the United States Air Force, and politician serving as the first director of the Travel and Vacation Bureau of the Pennsylvania Department of Commerce (now a part of Pennsylvania Department of Community and Economic Development) and Mayor of Harrisburg, Pennsylvania.

== Biography ==
He served as a staff sergeant in the Air Force during World War II, where he was shot down by German soldiers and captured as a Prisoner of War in 1945, for which he was awarded a Prisoner of War Medal. In 1954 Swenson started in the business of tourism, owning a travel agency on Third Street. From this he was appointed the first director of the Travel and Vacation Bureau of the Pennsylvania Department of Commerce in 1959 under Gov. George M. Leader and then David L. Lawrence, a job which he held for 8 years. He created and implemented what is now known as the Tourist Promotion Agency Fund. During this time he also met his wife Elsie, and together they continued to run their business until 1970. In 1969, Swenson won the mayoral race in Harrisburg in an upset against the Harvey Taylor machine and took office in 1970, becoming the first elected Democrat in 58 years. The Patriot News reporter Paul Beers wrote that within his first month he "established his magisterial presence, and within the first year he was regarded as the mayor of the entire Harrisburg area, invited to cut many of the ribbons in suburbia." At that time, his salary for Mayor was only $15,000, and his wife Elsie was earning more. Swenson was praised for navigating and calming anxieties after the 1969 Race Riots, Harrisburg Seven Trial, and then Flood of 1972 caused by Hurricane Agnes. In a daring investment of the City, he championed Harristown redeveloping Downtown with Strawberry Square. It was widely noted that he put managing before politics, and retained competent workers at City Hall regardless of party. Some criticized him of weak Democrat allegiance, calling him a "Republicrat," but in 1973 he was reelected for a second term, and promptly assisted in establishing the Capital Area Transit with the folding of the Harrisburg Railways. Following his mayoral tenure, Swenson was President of the Rotary Club of Harrisburg from 1983 to 1984. Together with his wife, they established the Harold and Elsie Swenson Fund with the Greater Harrisburg Foundation to support the Harrisburg park system. Following his passing in 1995, the Swenson Plaza was dedicated to him by Mayor Stephen R. Reed (who hired Swenson as a budget consultant upon being elected) in 1999 at the base of the Walnut Street Bridge.

Political offices
Preceded by Albert H. Straub	Mayor of Harrisburg; 1970-1978	Succeeded by Paul E. Doutrich, Jr
