= 1914 Pennsylvania gubernatorial election =

- November 3, 1914
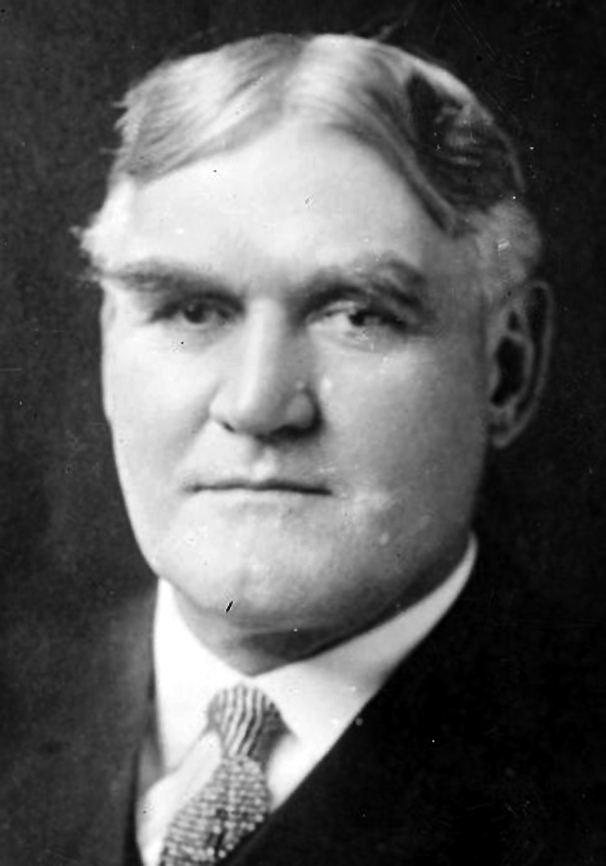

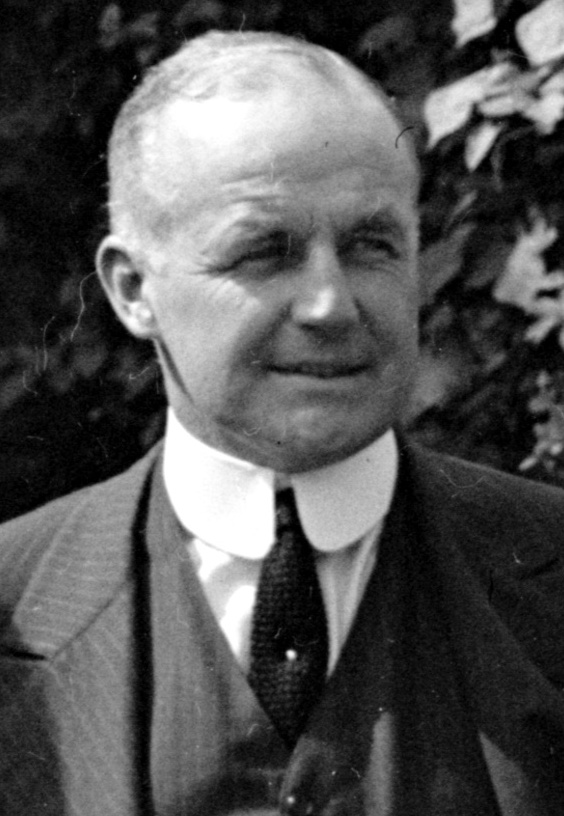
Nominee	Martin Brumbaugh	Vance McCormick
Party	Republican	Democratic
Popular vote	588,705	453,880
Percentage	52.98%	40.84%
- County results Brumbaugh: 40–50% 50–60% 60–70% 70–80% McCormick: 30–40% 40–50% 50–60% 60–70% 70–80%
Governor before election
John K. Tener
Republican
Elected Governor
Martin G. Brumbaugh
Republican

The 1914 Pennsylvania gubernatorial election occurred on November 3, 1914. Incumbent Republican governor John K. Tener was not a candidate for re-election. Republican candidate Martin Grove Brumbaugh defeated Democratic candidate Vance C. McCormick to become Governor of Pennsylvania.

== Results ==
1914 Pennsylvania gubernatorial election
Party	Candidate	Votes	%
Republican	Martin Grove Brumbaugh	588,705	52.98
Democratic	Vance C. McCormick	453,880	40.84
Socialist	Joseph B. Allen	40,115	3.61
Prohibition	Matthew H. Stevenson	17,467	1.57
Roosevelt Progressive	William Draper Lewis	6,503	0.59
Bull Moose	Charles N. Brumm	4,031	0.36
Industrialist	Caleb Harrison	533	0.05
Total votes		1,111,252	100.00
