= Dock Street Dam =

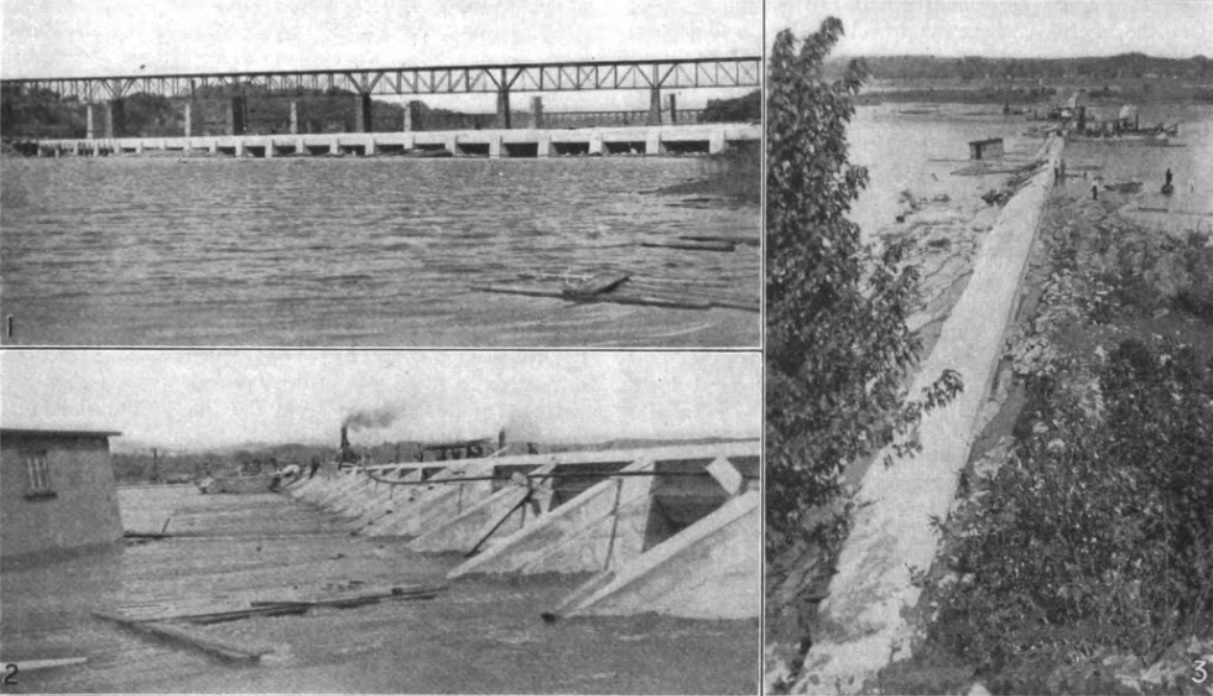
- Completed reinforced-concrete dam across Susquehanna River at Harrisburg
- Official name: Dock Street Dam
- Location: Harrisburg, Pennsylvania (Shipoke) and Cumberland County, Pennsylvania
- Coordinates: 40°14′55″N 76°52′43″W
- Opening date: 1913

Dam and spillways
- Impounds: Susquehanna River
- Height: 6 feet
- Length: 3,460 feet (1,050 m)

Reservoir
- Creates: Susquehanna River

The Dock Street Dam is a low-head dam that crosses the Susquehanna River between the Shipoke neighborhood of Harrisburg, Pennsylvania, on the east shore and Lemoyne on the west shore. It is constructed of hollow, reinforced concrete buttress dam and was built to create recreational depth as a 3-mile lake, provide flood control, prevent mosquitos, and minimize odors. Turbulence downstream of the dam contrasts sharply with the usually placid, lake-like river above the dam. In spite of the dam the Susquehanna is often just a few feet deep at Harrisburg. Proposals have been made to raise the height of the dam in order to enhance the river's navigability and recreational potential, although the suggestion remains controversial. The present structure has been criticized as creating currents downstream that can draw small boats upstream into the dam, an effect that has been cited in at least seventeen drownings. Since 1935, there have been over 30 documented fatalities because of the dam. Solutions have been proposed, including the piling of stone or concrete debris south of the dam to disrupt the current, but have not been implemented.

Dock Street, which was between Hanna and Hemlock streets in the Shipoke neighborhood ran east from Front Street to Ninth Street, was eliminated when Interstate 83 and the John Harris Bridge were built.

== See also ==
- List of dams and reservoirs of the Susquehanna River
- Shipoke
