= William K. Verbeke =

American politician

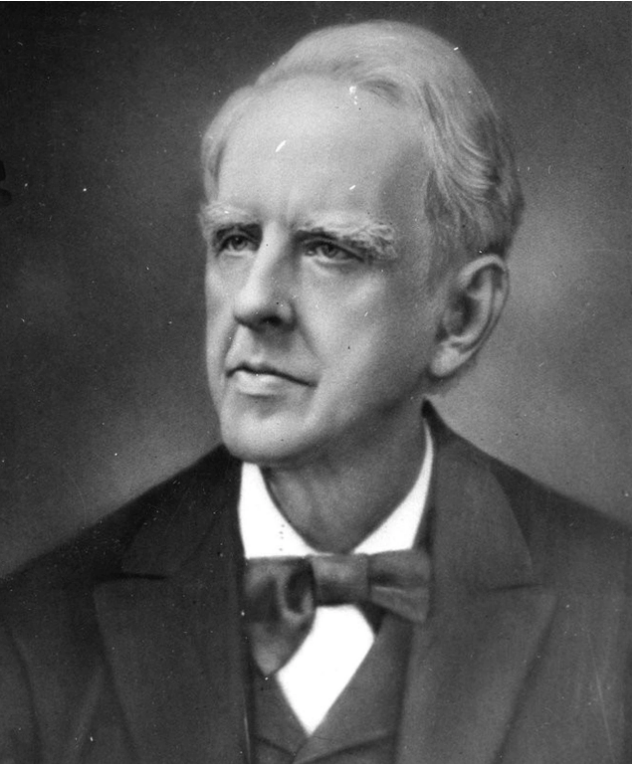

Mayor of Harrisburg
- In office 1871–1873
- Preceded by: George B. Cole
- Succeeded by: Jacob D. Boas

Personal details
- Born: William Kemmeller Verbeke; July 18, 1820; Harrisburg, Pennsylvania, U.S.
- Died: February 23, 1898 (77 years old)
- Resting place: Harrisburg Cemetery
- Political party: Democratic
- Spouse: Marion Anderson (m. January 4, 1849)
- Children: 12

William Kemmeller Verbeke (July 18, 1820 – February 23, 1898) was an American businessman, philanthropist, early developer of Harrisburg, Pennsylvania and politician who served as a City Controller, School Director and Mayor of Harrisburg.

== Biography ==
After initially investing his 1856 inheritance from his late father in land adjacent to downtown Harrisburg, he began developing a new ward of the city. In what he first called "West Harrisburg" (present day Midtown) due to the orientation of the maps at the time, he developed a neighborhood built by and sold to very low income residents; this area would come to be known briefly as "Verbeketown" until annexed into the newly incorporated city in 1860. Verbeke helped to organize and serve as Presiding Officer of the Good Will Fire Company No. 7 (located at 1212-1224 Ridge Ave (Sixth Street)) from May 1860 until 1867. Starting in 1860, he also built the Broad Street Market. Though the Market was planned to be built on what was already "Broad Street," the Streets Committee (which included Verbeke) officially renamed it Verbeke Street in the summer of 1863. When the Confederate States Army first invaded Pennsylvania during the American Civil War, the Harrisburg Daily Patriot And Union, which regarded Verbeke as "one of our best and known and most highly esteemed citizens," reported that he immediately organized and promised wages to a group of thirty-six men and three wagons known as the Verbeke Guards to muster at Camp Curtin under Col. Asbury F. Awl's 201st Pennsylvania Infantry Regiment. In 1871, after winning a majority vote over 200 in the previous fall's election, he became Mayor of Harrisburg. In 1883 as City Controller he balanced the budget to first place in the State.

Political offices
Preceded by George B. Cole	Mayor of Harrisburg, Pennsylvania; 1871–1873	Succeeded by Jacob D. Boas
