= John Augustus Fritchey =

American politician

John Augustus Fritchey M.D.
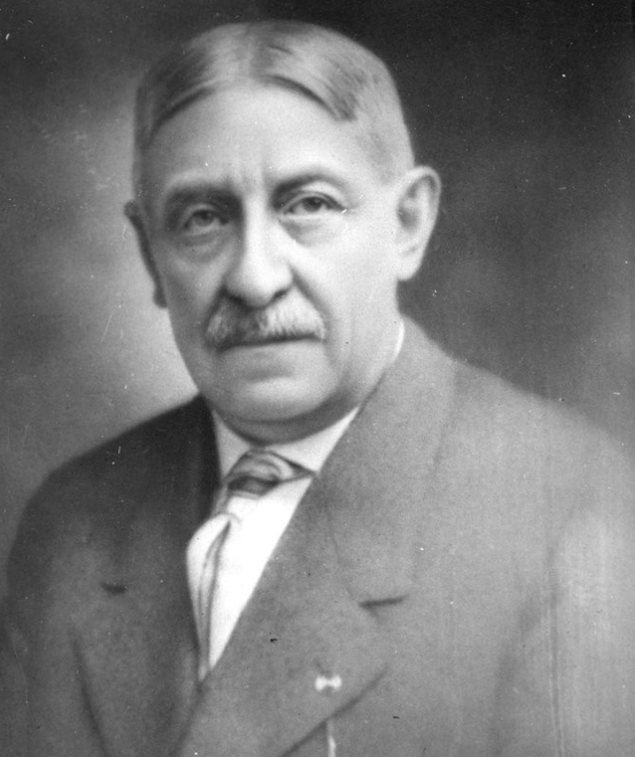

Mayor of Harrisburg
- In office 1887–1893
- Preceded by: Samuel W. Fleming
- Succeeded by: Maurice C. Eby

Mayor of Harrisburg
- In office 1899–1902
- Preceded by: John D. Patterson
- Succeeded by: Vance C. McCormick

Personal details
- Born: John Augustus Fritchey; September 25, 1857; Harrisburg, Pennsylvania, U.S.
- Died: August 25, 1916 (58 years old)
- Resting place: Harrisburg Cemetery
- Political party: Democratic
- Education: University of Pennsylvania School of Medicine

John Augustus Fritchey, M.D. (September 25, 1857 - August 25, 1916) was an American physician and politician, who served three terms as Mayor of Harrisburg, Pennsylvania.

== Formative years ==
Born on September 25, 1857, Fritchey was a son of a middle-class butcher. He attended the Harrisburg Academy and the University of Pennsylvania School of Medicine.

== Career ==
Endorsed by the Harrisburg Patriot during the 1887 Harrisburg Mayoral Race, he was initially hailed as a "young man of ability and integrity". From his first term, he established the Harrisburg Bureau of Police and ambulance services, but was reported as extorting speakeasies, gambling houses and brothels for police protection, and was subsequently was held responsible when an audit determined that the city government was missing funds.

When Mira Lloyd Dock presented her ideas for the City Beautiful movement, he showed tepid support, leading J. Horace McFarland to refer to him as "the unspeakable Fritchey." Despite private feuds, Fritchey was popular amongst all classes, including the largely Republican city at the time; he won his third reelection by a large majority.

Fritchey was also elected multiple times as chairman for The Dauphin County Democratic Committee and was considered well known in national and state politics.

As a practicing physician, he was notable for providing abortions at a time when they were illegal in the commonwealth; women from out of town would ride the train into Harrisburg to receive the procedures in secrecy.
