= Shipoke, Harrisburg, Pennsylvania =

Shipoke
- Neighborhood of Harrisburg
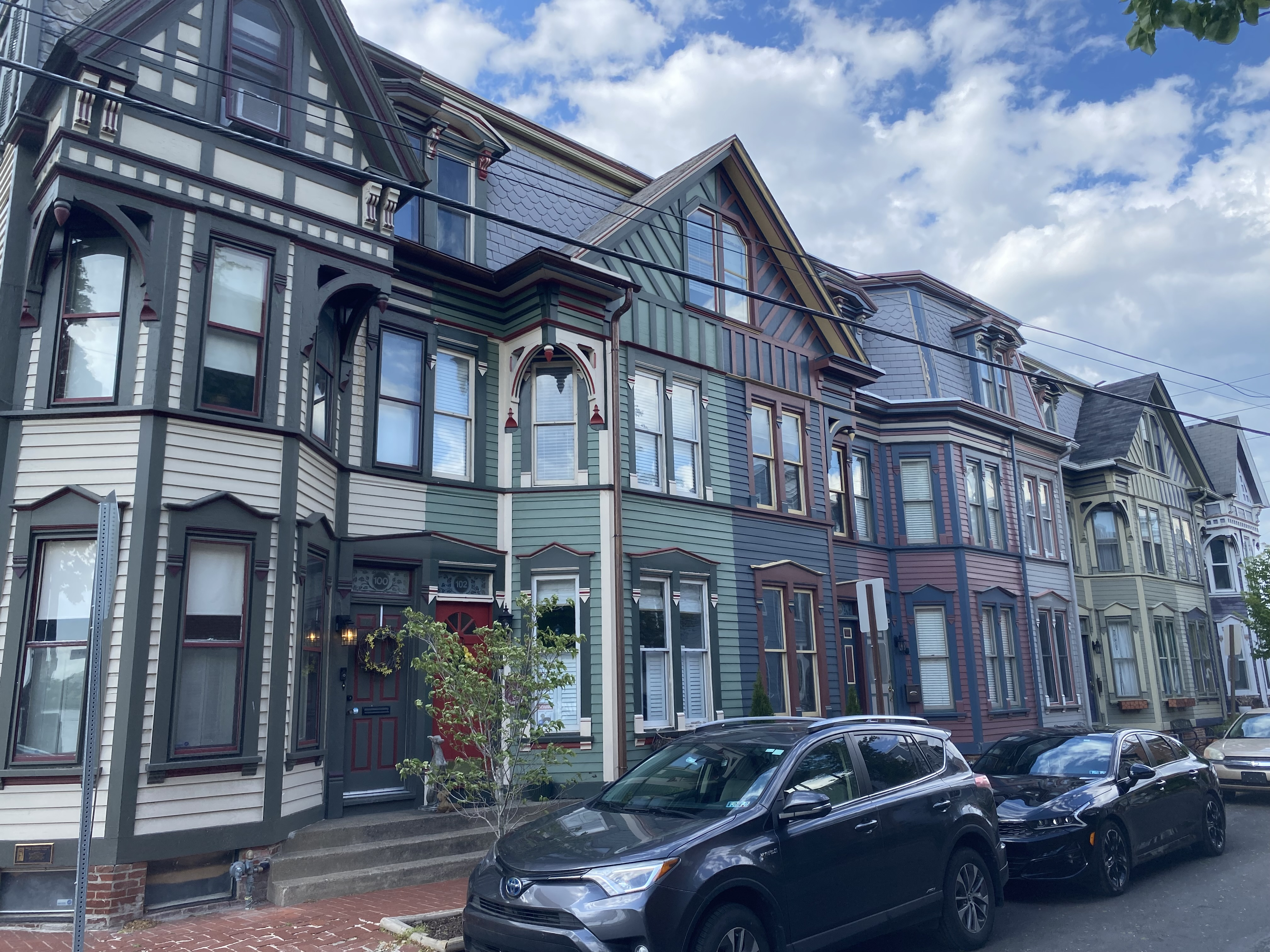
- "Pancake Row" along Conoy Street
- Coordinates: 40°15′13″N 76°52′30″W
- Country: United States
- State: Pennsylvania
- County: Dauphin County
- City: Harrisburg
- ZIP code: 17104
- Area codes: 717, 223
- Website: Shipoke Neighborhood Association

Shipoke (SHY-poke) is a neighborhood in Harrisburg, Pennsylvania. Shipoke is delineated by I-83 to the south, Washington Street to the north, Second Street to the east, and the Susquehanna River to the west. It is Harrisburg's Ward Number 1. Shipoke is very small compared to the other neighborhoods of Harrisburg.

== History ==
Shipoke was first settled by Europeans in 1710 as a small trading post before other areas of the current city. It was here that the Harris Ferry and Tavern was originally located, which is the origin of the name Harrisburg. Because all of the neighborhood lies within the flood plain of the Susquehanna River, most major storms lead to dangerous flooding in this area. After historic cycles of falling into disrepair, Shipoke was devastated by the flooding associated with Hurricane Agnes in 1972. Many of the Victorian houses were abandoned after, and they were sold to developers for nominal costs. "Pancake Row" is a historic section of Carpenter Gothic row houses along Conoy Street built in 1888 by Jacob Pancake of Trullinger & Co. lumber. In more recent times, an electrical fire, caused by an ice flood, destroyed most of the houses in 1996, but the houses were restored and reconstructed through a citywide effort. More recently, the remnants of Hurricane Ivan in 2004 and Tropical Storm Lee in 2011 led to severe flooding and damage in this area. After years of rehabilitation, Shipoke now is a picturesque, affluent neighborhood known for its beautiful river views. A number of festivals are held annually in Riverfront Park along the river near Shipoke.

In 2018, historian and author Dr. Michael L. Barton wrote a satire fiction book of the neighborhood entitled Shitepoke: Venice on the Susquehanna.

== See also ==
- List of Harrisburg neighborhoods
- Dock Street Dam
