= Harrisburg Cemetery =

United States historic place in Pennsylvania

Coordinates: 40.27203°N 76.87231°W

- U.S. National Register of Historic Places
- U.S. Historic district
- Pennsylvania state historical marker
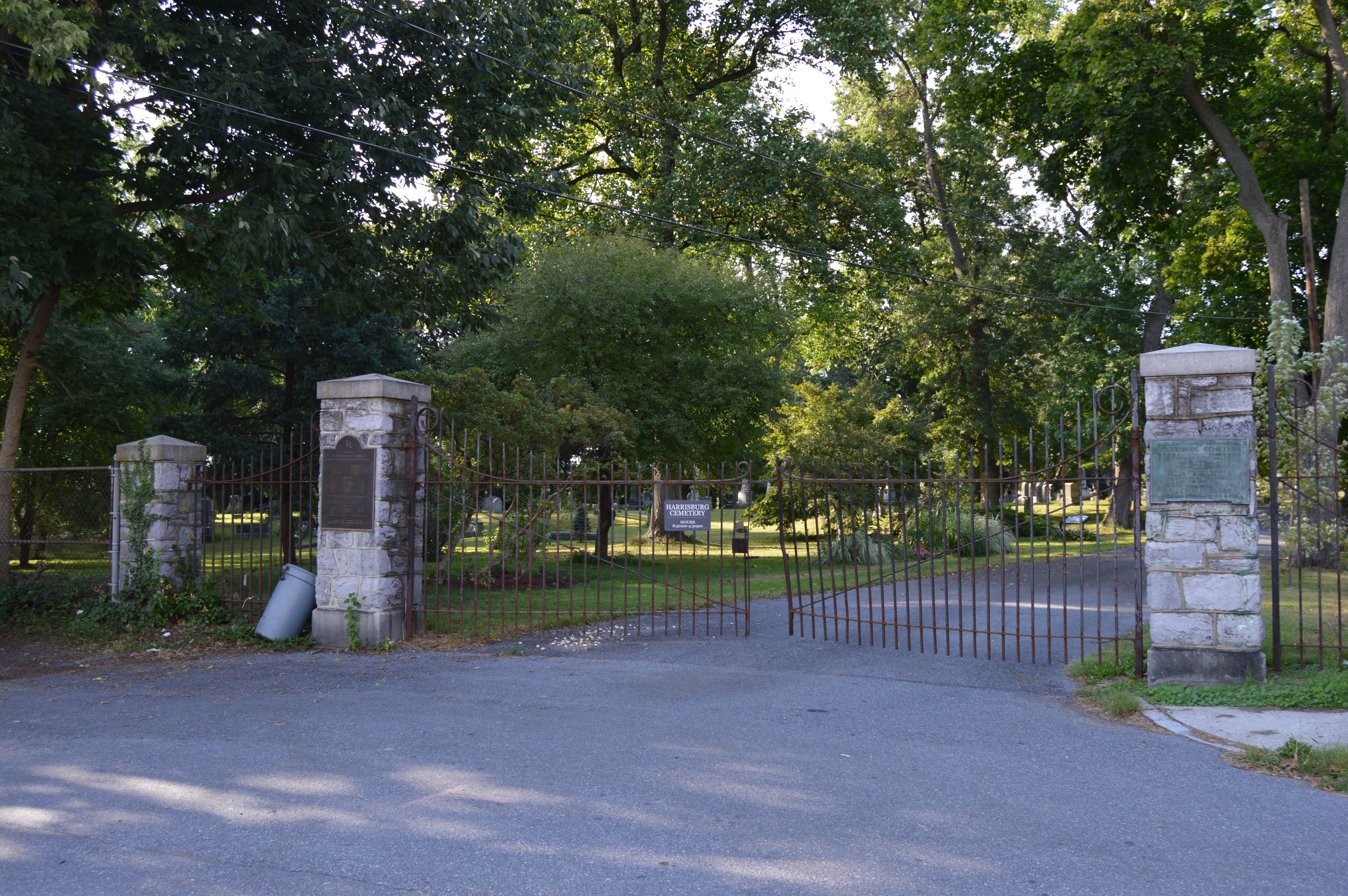
- Entrance to Harrisburg Cemetery in Harrisburg, Pennsylvania

- Location within Pennsylvania Location within the United States
- Location: 13th and Liberty Sts., Harrisburg, Pennsylvania, U.S.
- Area: 35 acres (14 ha)
- Built: 1845
- Architectural style: Gothic Revival
- NRHP reference No.: 85000866

Significant dates
- Added to NRHP: March 07, 1985
- Designated PHMC: September 30, 1990

Harrisburg Cemetery, sometimes referred to as Mount Kalmia Cemetery, is a prominent rural cemetery and national historic district in Harrisburg, Pennsylvania, located at 13th and Liberty streets in the Allison Hill/East Harrisburg neighborhoods of the city. It was founded in 1845, though interments took place for many years before.

The cemetery is also the burial ground for American Revolutionary War soldiers. The caretaker's cottage was built in 1850. It was designed by famed 19th Century architect, Andrew Jackson Downing, in the Gothic Revival style.

It was listed on the National Register of Historic Places in 1985.

== Notable burials ==
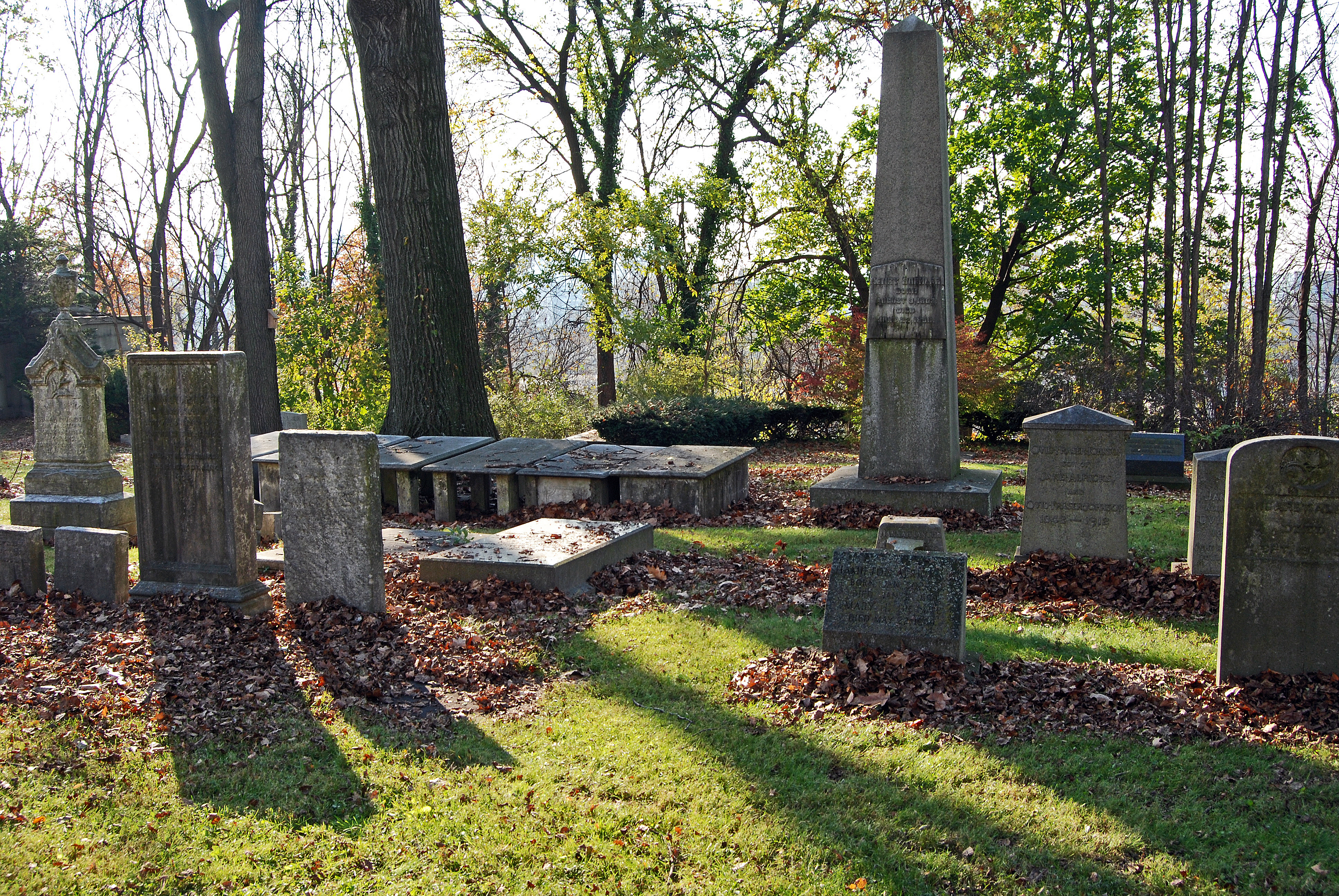
Harrisburg Cemetery in November 2012

- Edward E. Beidleman (1873–1929), Pennsylvania State Representative and State Senator and Pennsylvania's 12th lieutenant governor
- George Grey Barnard (1863–1938), sculptor of several figures at the new Pennsylvania State Capitol
- Jacob D. Boas (1806–1887), Pennsylvania state senator and Harrisburg mayor
- John Conrad Bucher (1792–1844), U.S. Congressman from Pennsylvania
- James Donald Cameron (1833–1918), Secretary of War and U.S. Senator from Pennsylvania
- Simon Cameron (1799–1889), Secretary of War for Abraham Lincoln
- Charles C. Davis (1830–1909), United States Army Medal of Honor recipient during American Civil War
- William Findlay (1768–1846), Pennsylvania governor and U.S. Mint director
- John Augustus Fritchey (1857–1916), three-term Harrisburg mayor
- John White Geary (1819–1873), first mayor of San Francisco, governor of Kansas Territory, governor of Pennsylvania, and Union Army general in American Civil War
- Jacob Samils Haldeman (1821–1889), Pennsylvania State Representative and U.S. Ambassador to Sweden
- Richard Jacobs Haldeman (1831–1886), U.S. Congressman from Pennsylvania
- John Andre Hanna (1762–1805), U.S. Congressman from Pennsylvania and delegate to the state convention to ratify the U.S. Constitution; and brigadier general during Whisky Insurrection
- Robert Harris (Pennsylvania) (1768–1851), U.S. Congressman from Pennsylvania
- John Christian Kunkel (1816–1870), U.S. Congressman from Pennsylvania
- George Kunkel (politician) (1893–1965), Pennsylvania state senator
- John Crain Kunkel (1898–1970), U.S. Congressman
- Vance C. McCormick (1872–1946), chair of the American delegation at the Treaty of Versailles
- J. Horace McFarland (1777–1840), American businessman, writer, leading proponent of the American City Beautiful Movement
- Benjamin Franklin Meyers (1833–1918), U.S. Congressman from Pennsylvania
- William Henry Miller (1829–1870), U.S. Congressman from Pennsylvania
- Jesse Miller (1800–1850), Jacksonian member of the U.S. House of Representatives from Pennsylvania
- Ray Coleman Mueller (1912–1994), professional baseball player
- Marlin Edgar Olmsted (1847–1913), U.S. Congressman from Pennsylvania
- John James Pearson (1800–1888), U.S. Congressman and judge from Pennsylvania
- David Rittenhouse Porter (1788–1867), Pennsylvania governor
- David P. Reese Jr. (1905–1962), Pennsylvania state representative
- Luther Reily (1794–1854), U.S. Congressman from Pennsylvania
- Charles "Dutch" Schesler (1900–1953), Major League Baseball player
- William K. Verbeke (1820–1898), Harrisburg developer, philanthropist, and Harrisburg mayor
- John Winebrenner (1797–1860), religious leader and founder of the first Church of God in Pennsylvania
- George Wolf (1777–1840), Pennsylvania governor

== See also ==
- List of Pennsylvania cemeteries
- List of cemeteries in the United States
