= Vance C. McCormick =

American politician and businessman (1872–1946)

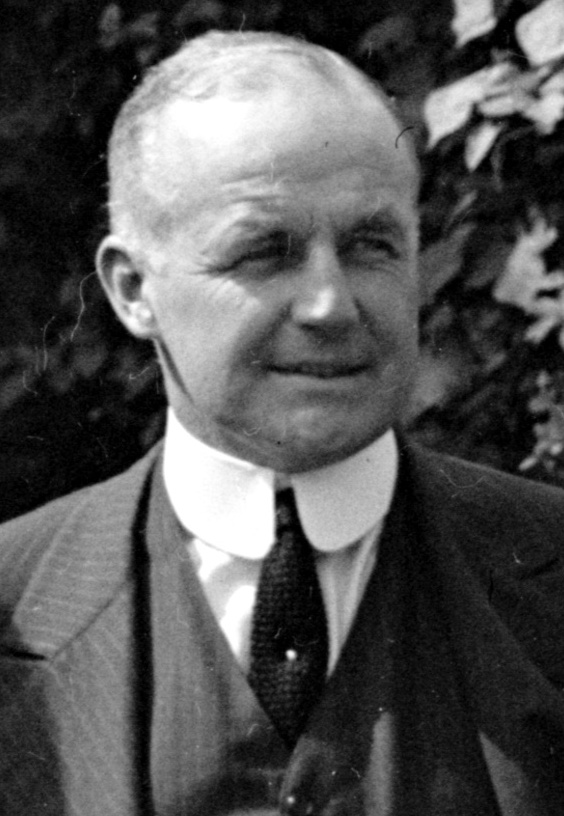
- McCormick in 1916

Chair of the Democratic National Committee
- In office June 15, 1916 – January 15, 1919
- Preceded by: William McCombs
- Succeeded by: Homer Cummings

Mayor of Harrisburg
- In office January 6, 1902 – June 30, 1905
- Preceded by: John A. Fritchey
- Succeeded by: Edward Gross

Personal details
- Born: Vance Criswell McCormick; June 19, 1872
- Died: June 16, 1946 (aged 73) Camp Hill, Pennsylvania, U.S.
- Party: Democratic
- Spouse: Gertrude Olmsted
- Education: Yale University
- Profession: Businessman; Publisher; Politician

Vance Criswell McCormick (June 19, 1872 – June 16, 1946) was an American politician and businessman. He served as mayor of Harrisburg from 1902 to 1905 and as chair of the Democratic National Committee from 1916 to 1919. He also served as the leader of the American delegation at the Treaty of Versailles in 1919, appointed by American president Woodrow Wilson.

== Biography ==
McCormick was born in 1872 to Henry McCormick and Annie Criswell. He attended Harrisburg Academy and Phillips Andover before completing a civil engineering course at Yale University. McCormick graduated from Yale's Sheffield Scientific School in 1893, and was given an honorary MA degree by the university in 1907. While at Yale he was a member of St. Anthony Hall. A born athlete and leader, he became captain of the class football and baseball teams his freshman year and was on the university football team his junior and senior years. Vance was named to Walter Camp's All American Team as the first team quarterback. He served as president of Intercollegiate Football Association his senior year and garnered other university honors and awards, as well, including being a class deacon. He was also student body president of Yale in 1893.

=== Business and politics ===
In 1902, McCormick began his career as journalist and publisher. He was president of The Patriot Company, publishers of several area newspapers including The Patriot (1902 to 1946), The Evening News (1917 to 1946), and Harrisburg Common Council (1900 to 1902). He was also president of the Pinkey Mining Company, located in Harrisburg.

In 1902, McCormick was elected mayor of Harrisburg and as part of the growing City Beautiful movement he immediately set about to improve the city. Today, he is credited with expanding the city park system (which eventually included 1,100 acres), built steps along the Susquehanna River and paved Riverfront Park (which still exists today), paved seventy miles of roads, and improved the city water system. During this time, the population of Harrisburg increased from 51,000 to 73,000. His uncle, Edward Z. Gross, would go on to succeed him as Mayor of Harrisburg in 1905.

In 1912, he served as a delegate to the Democratic National Convention from Pennsylvania. McCormick was the Democratic nominee for Governor of Pennsylvania in 1914, finishing second in a seven-candidate field. Republican nominee Martin Brumbaugh, Superintendent of the School District of Philadelphia, defeated McCormick on the strength of a strong performance in Philadelphia and Allegheny counties. From 1916 to 1919, McCormick served as chairman of the Democratic National Committee and went on to be appointed chair of the American Commission to Negotiate Peace (1919) at Versailles, under President Woodrow Wilson, heading up numerous clubs and organizations along the way. He also served as Wilson's 1916 campaign manager, as chair of the War Trade Board (1916 to 1919) and as a member of many local, state, national and international organizations throughout the later years.

He helped professor Thomas Garrigue Masaryk legions especially in Russia in 1918.

=== Later life ===
McCormick remained a bachelor until the age of 52, when he married the widow of Martin Olmsted, an eight-term Republican Congressman. They announced their engagement on December 29, 1924. Vance died at his country estate (Cedar Cliff Farms), June 16, 1946, near Camp Hill, Pennsylvania. Mrs. McCormick died in 1953. McCormick was a teetotaler for his lifetime.

== Head coaching record ==
Year	Team	Overall	Conference	Standing	Bowl/playoffs
Carlisle Indians (Independent) (1894–1895)
1894	Carlisle	1–6–2			
1895	Carlisle	4–4			
Carlisle:		5–10–2			
Total:		5–10–2			

Political offices
Preceded by John A. Fritchey	Mayor of Harrisburg, Pennsylvania; 1902–1905	Succeeded by Edward Gross
Party political offices
Preceded by William McCombs	Chairman of the Democratic National Committee; 1916–1919	Succeeded by Homer Cummings
Preceded by Webster Grimm	Democratic nominee for Governor of Pennsylvania; 1914	Succeeded by Eugene Bonniwell
