= Old Midtown Historic District (Harrisburg) =

Historic district in Pennsylvania, United States

- Midtown Harrisburg Historic District
- U.S. National Register of Historic Places
- U.S. Historic district
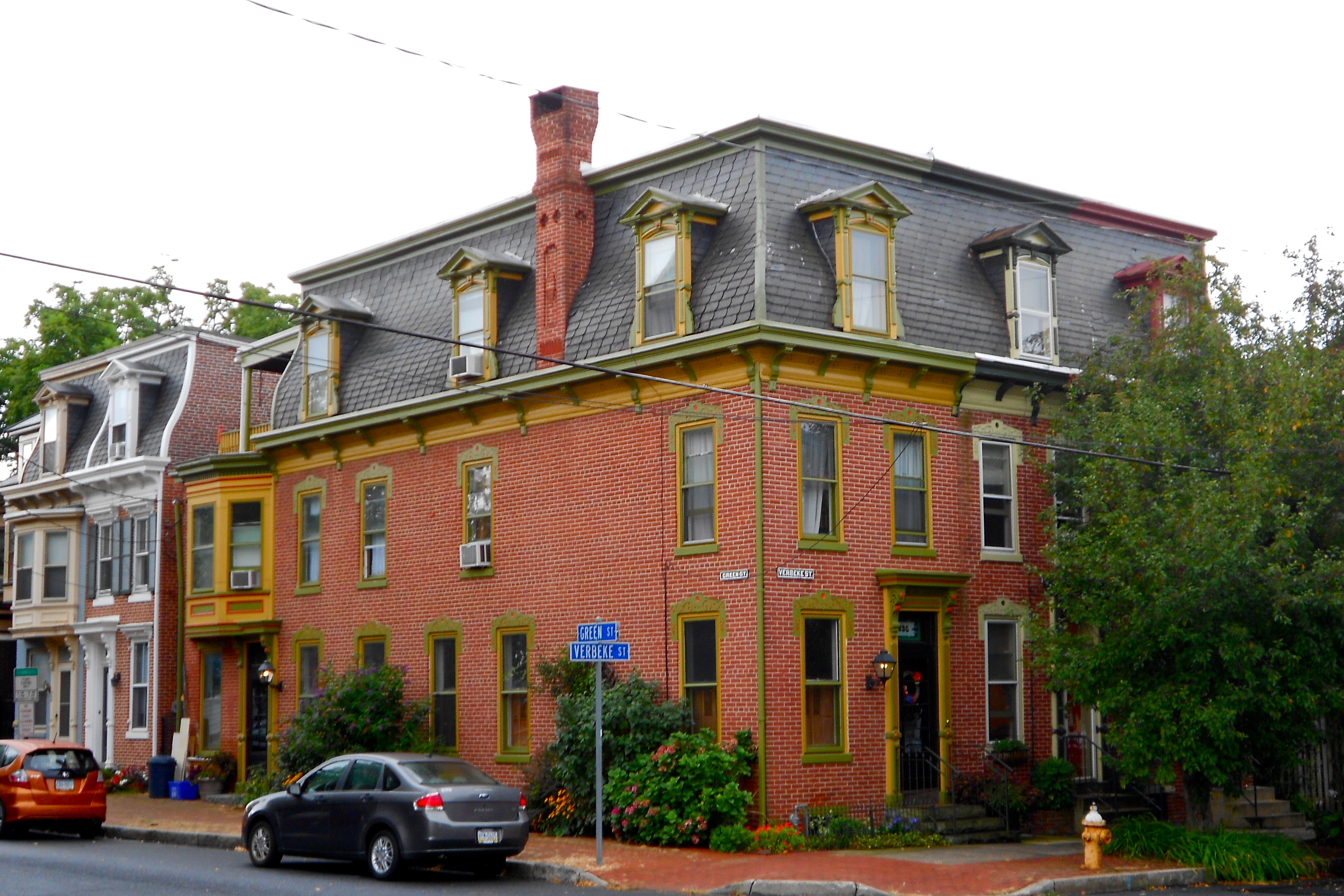
- Historic home architecture as seen from the Corner of Green & Verbeke Streets

- Location within Pennsylvania Location within the United States
- Location: Roughly bounded by Susquehanna River, Forster, Verbeke, and 3rd Sts., Harrisburg, Pennsylvania
- Coordinates: 40°16′2″N 76°53′26″W
- Area: 43 acres (17 ha)
- Architect: Multiple
- Architectural style: Late Victorian, Federal
- NRHP reference No.: 83002237
- Added to NRHP: April 21, 1983

The Old Midtown Historic District is a historic district that is located in the Midtown neighborhood of Harrisburg, Pennsylvania. It stretches from Forster to Verbeke and from Front to Third street, and represents the first urbanized neighborhood in the city of Harrisburg.

== History ==
The Historic Harrisburg Association first lobbied for this district's creation in 1974. The area of Third street near Verbeke is known as the Historic Midtown Market District and is home to many unique boutiques, galleries and shops.

Before 1950, Midtown was a seamless northern extension of the residential neighborhood located south of Forster Street, which today marks the northern boundary of the city's downtown residential area. At that time, Forster Street functioned as a typical cross street, similar to Briggs Street to the south and Boas Street to the north. However, as the Pennsylvania State Capitol Complex grew, better access from the West Shore became necessary to accommodate increasing commuter traffic. In 1950, the M. Harvey Taylor Bridge was built, and Forster Street was expanded into a six-lane thoroughfare, physically dividing the once unified neighborhood. This division created a clear separation, both physically and psychologically, between Midtown and the area south of Forster Street.

Midtown’s historical importance, recognized through its designation as a municipal historic district, is rooted in its cohesive and intact block fronts, preserved architectural character, period of construction, proximity to the Susquehanna River and Riverfront Park, and its relationship to the Broad Street Market. As one of Harrisburg's earliest subdivided neighborhoods with substantial building stock, it represents a significant example of late 19th-century urban America.

Former Harrisburg Mayor William K. Verbeke is the namesake for Verbeke Street (formerly Broad Street) and first bought and developed the area.

== Places of Note ==
- Broad Street Market
- Harrisburg Midtown Arts Center
- Historic Harrisburg Resource Center
- Holocaust Memorial
- Sunken Gardens at Riverfront Park

== See also ==
- List of Harrisburg neighborhoods
