= South Harrisburg, Pennsylvania =

South Harrisburg
- Neighborhood of Harrisburg
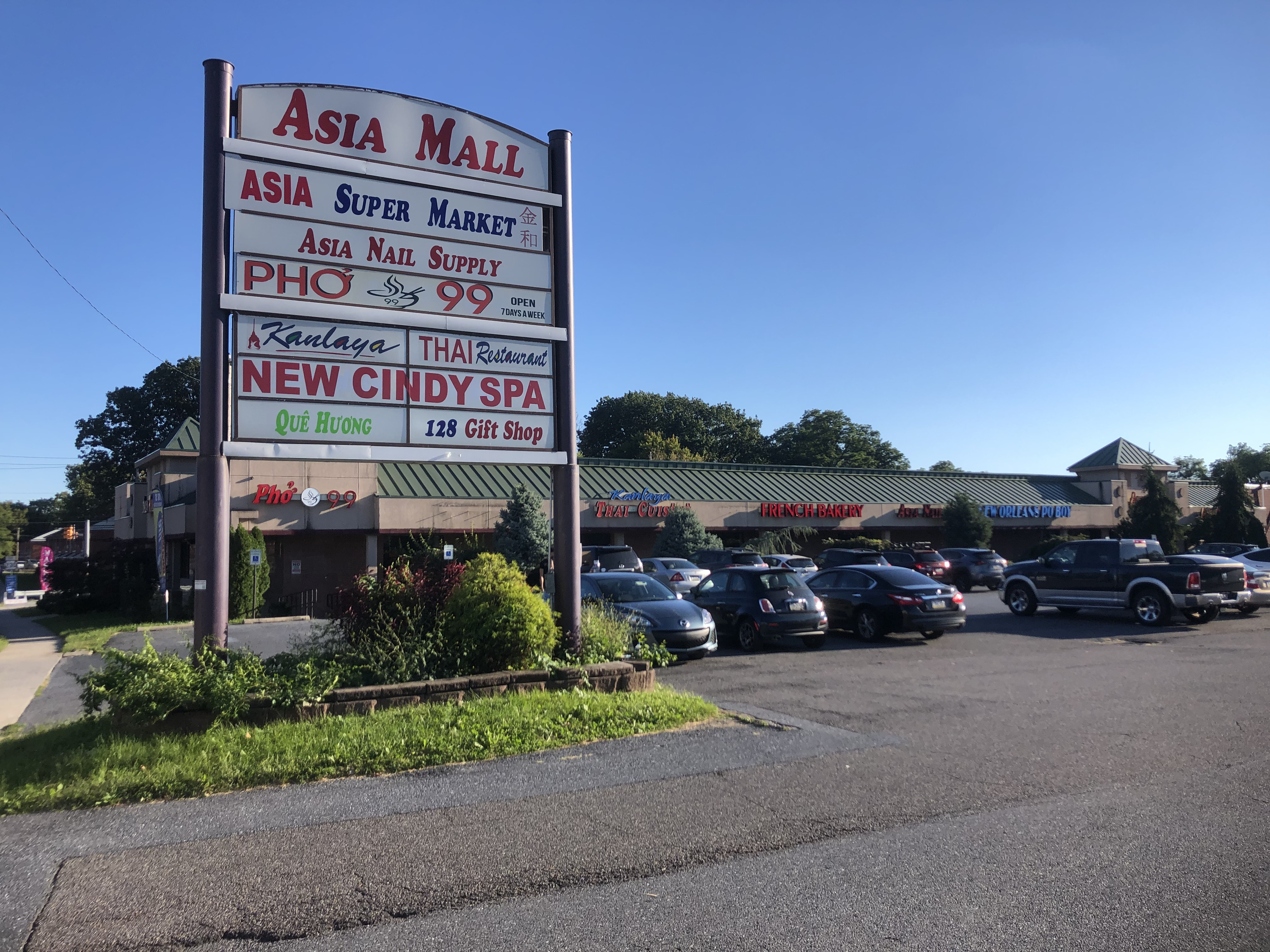
- The Asia Mall in South Harrisburg is a cultural staple to the large Asian Pacific American community
- Interactive map of South Harrisburg
- Coordinates: 40.25290°N 76.85789°W
- Country: United States
- State: Pennsylvania
- County: Dauphin County
- City: Harrisburg
- ZIP codes: 17104 and 17106
- Area codes: 717 and 223

South Harrisburg (or South Side) is an area of, and neighborhood within, the city of Harrisburg, Pennsylvania in the United States.

== Geography ==
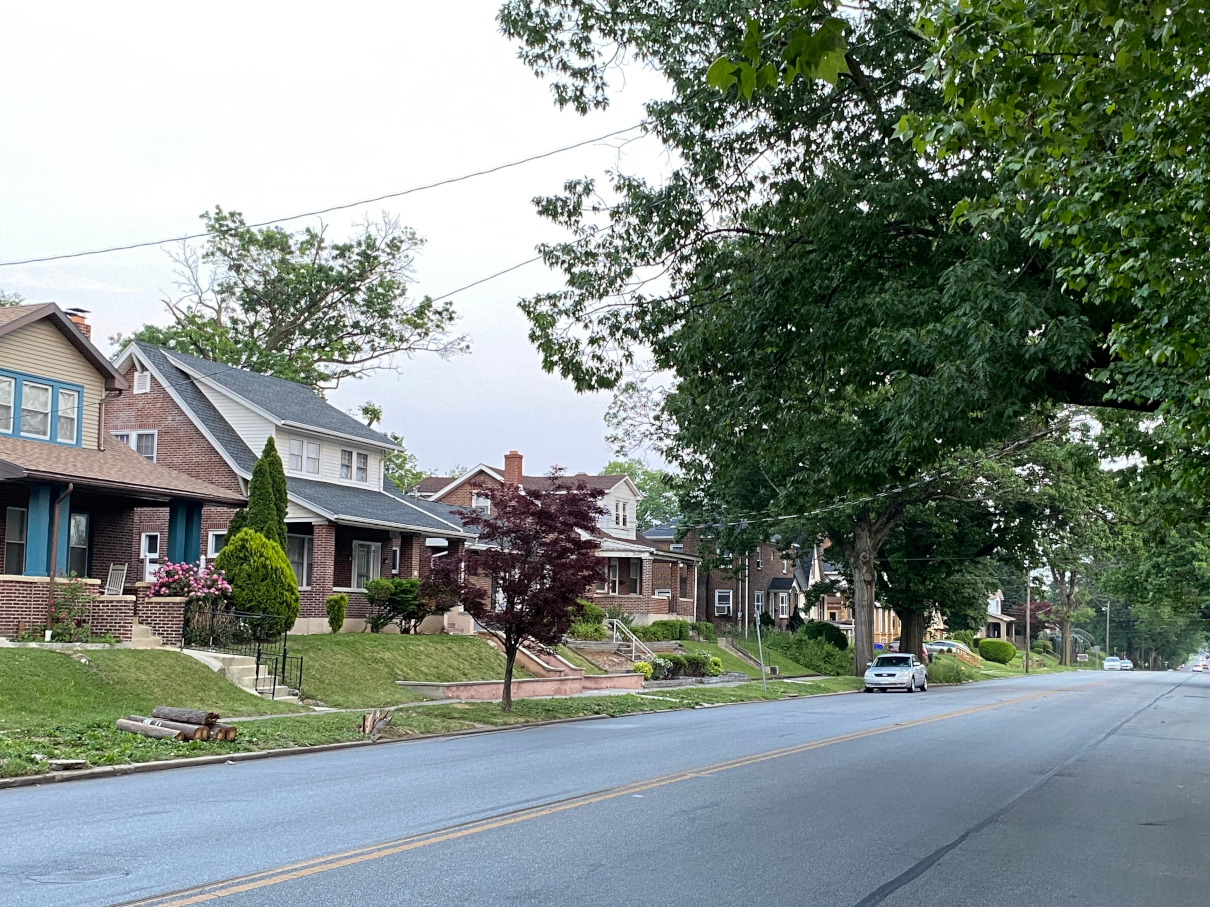
Housing stock on South 19th Street

The southern border of this Harrisburg neighborhood is Steelton, Pennsylvania; the eastern border is the Capital Area Greenbelt. Its northern border is Interstate 83, and its western border is the Susquehanna River.

South Harrisburg consists of a mix of industrial areas on its outskirts with several housing developments located centrally and eastern, with auto-centric commercial areas in the north.

Notably, the area contains the city's long contested Harrisburg Incinerator located off of Cameron Street, which introduces environmental justice concerns for nearby residents, many of whom fall into low- and moderate-income (LMI) categories. There are, however, large amounts of undeveloped green spaces and access to parks and trails, particularly the Capital Area Greenbelt.

The historic Harrisburg 19th Street Armory is located within Harrisburg and is listed on the National Register of Historic Places. PennDOT's state headquarters building for Driver & Vehicle Services is also located within South Harrisburg along the river.

In 2023, the City began the design process of overhauling the mixed income neighborhoods within South Harrisburg, Hall Manor and Hoverter Homes. The same year, City Council approved a project of $3.4 million in private investment into the neighborhood to construct a new affordable housing apartment complex.

== See also ==
- List of Harrisburg neighborhoods
