= Fox Ridge Historic District (Harrisburg) =

Coordinates: 40.26806°N 76.88573°W

Fox Ridge
- Neighborhood of Harrisburg
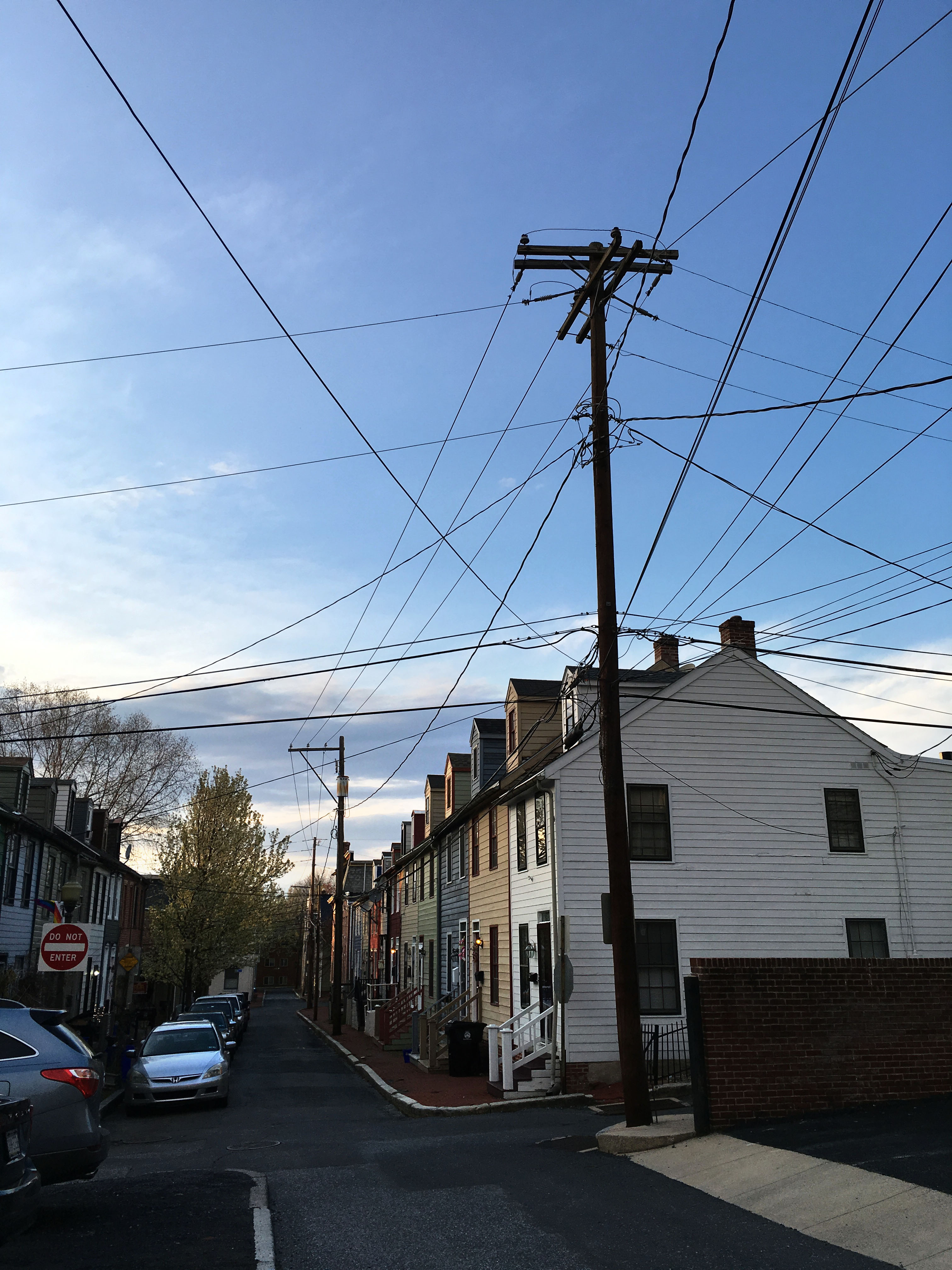
- Housing stock in Fox Ridge neighborhood along Grand St.
- Interactive map of Fox Ridge
- Country: United States
- State: Pennsylvania
- County: Dauphin County
- City: Harrisburg
- ZIP Code: 17102
- Area codes: 717 and 223

The Fox Ridge Historic District (or Fox Ridge) is a municipal historic district and neighborhood within Midtown, Harrisburg recognized by the Pennsylvania Historical and Museum Commission (PHMC). The district was adopted by the PHMC in February 1983 and certified by the Secretary of the Interior in January 1985 as an addition to the larger Harrisburg Historic District. The neighborhood district, sometimes called Old Fox Ridge, is between Third and 6th Streets and Forster and Herr Streets. It contains mostly 19th Century vernacular style homes, with some institutional buildings. New Fox Ridge, a homeowners association, is one of the city's first modern town house developments, a collection of 63 brick town houses along North Third Street.

== History ==
The name Fox Ridge comes from John Fox, an early landowner in the area, and Ridge Avenue, the former name for North 6th Street based upon its topography. Fox Ridge has gone through several alterations through the from late 1950's to the mid-1970s. The construction of New Fox Ridge and Cumberland Court apartments began in 1974 with the leveling and razing of multiple properties, and the elimination of Cumberland, Hay and Montgomery Streets from Fox Ridge.

During Mayor Stephen R. Reed's tenure, City money was spent to help revitalize the neighborhood. Because of the neighborhood's historic Jackson Rooming House along Sixth Street, which hosted African-Americans (Ella Fitzgerald and Louis Armstrong famously among them), it was proposed in 2004 to be the site of a National African American Cultural Center, which the city passed on. Since then, retired NFL player LeSean McCoy purchased the properties for renovation as well as a new affordable housing senior living project.
