= Broad Street Market =

- U.S. National Register of Historic Places
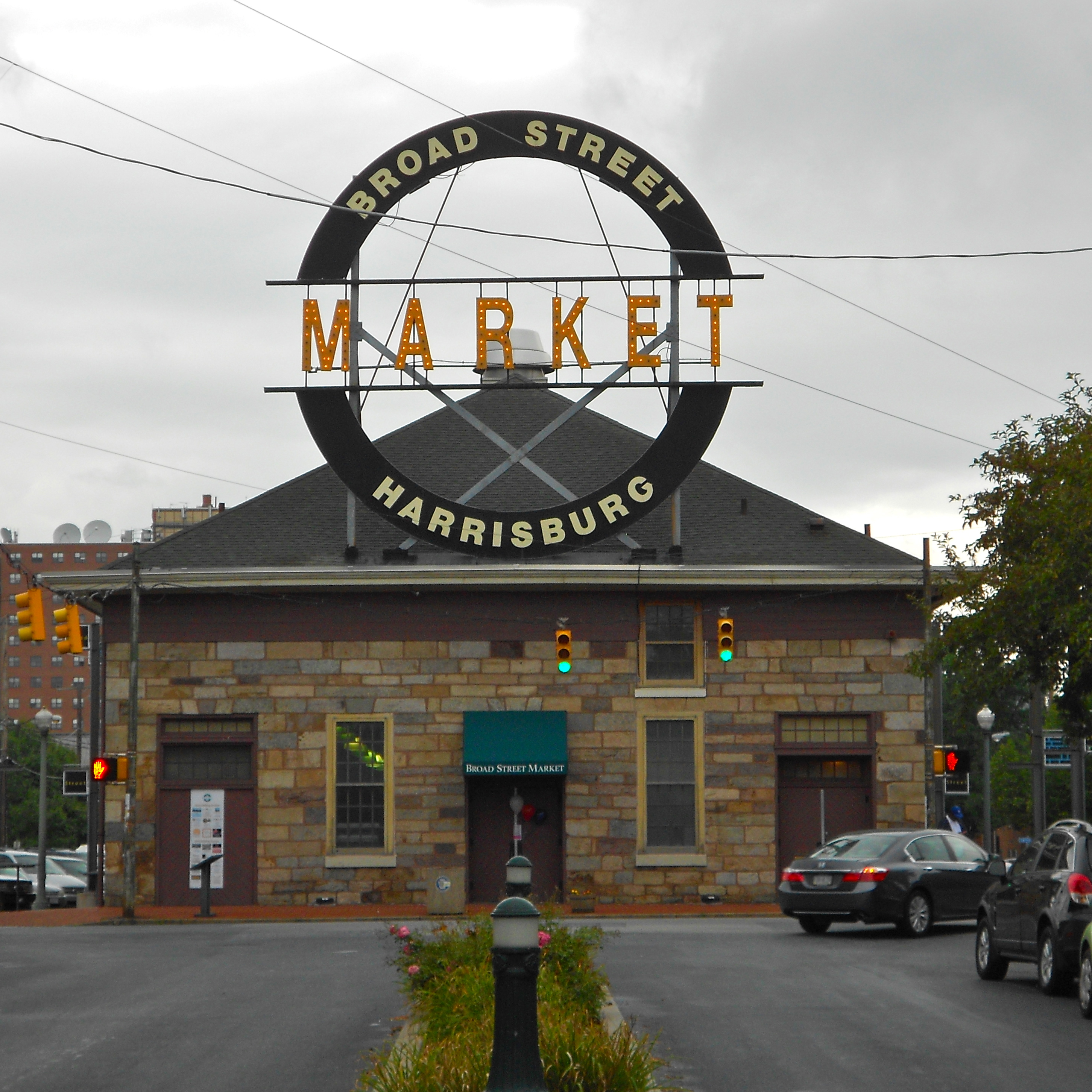
- Façade of the Stone Building, as seen from Verbeke Street in 2013

- Location within Pennsylvania Location within the United States
- Location: Verbeke Street between 3rd and 6th Streets, Harrisburg, Pennsylvania
- Coordinates: 40°16′11″N 76°53′19″W
- Built: 1863
- Architectural style: Classical Revival, Italianate
- NRHP reference No.: 74001780
- Added to NRHP: December 27, 1974

The Broad Street Market, opened in 1863, is located in the Midtown neighborhood of Harrisburg, Pennsylvania in the United States. Originally established on Broad Street (now Verbeke Street) by the Verbeke family, it is today one of the oldest continuously operating farmers markets in the country.

== History ==
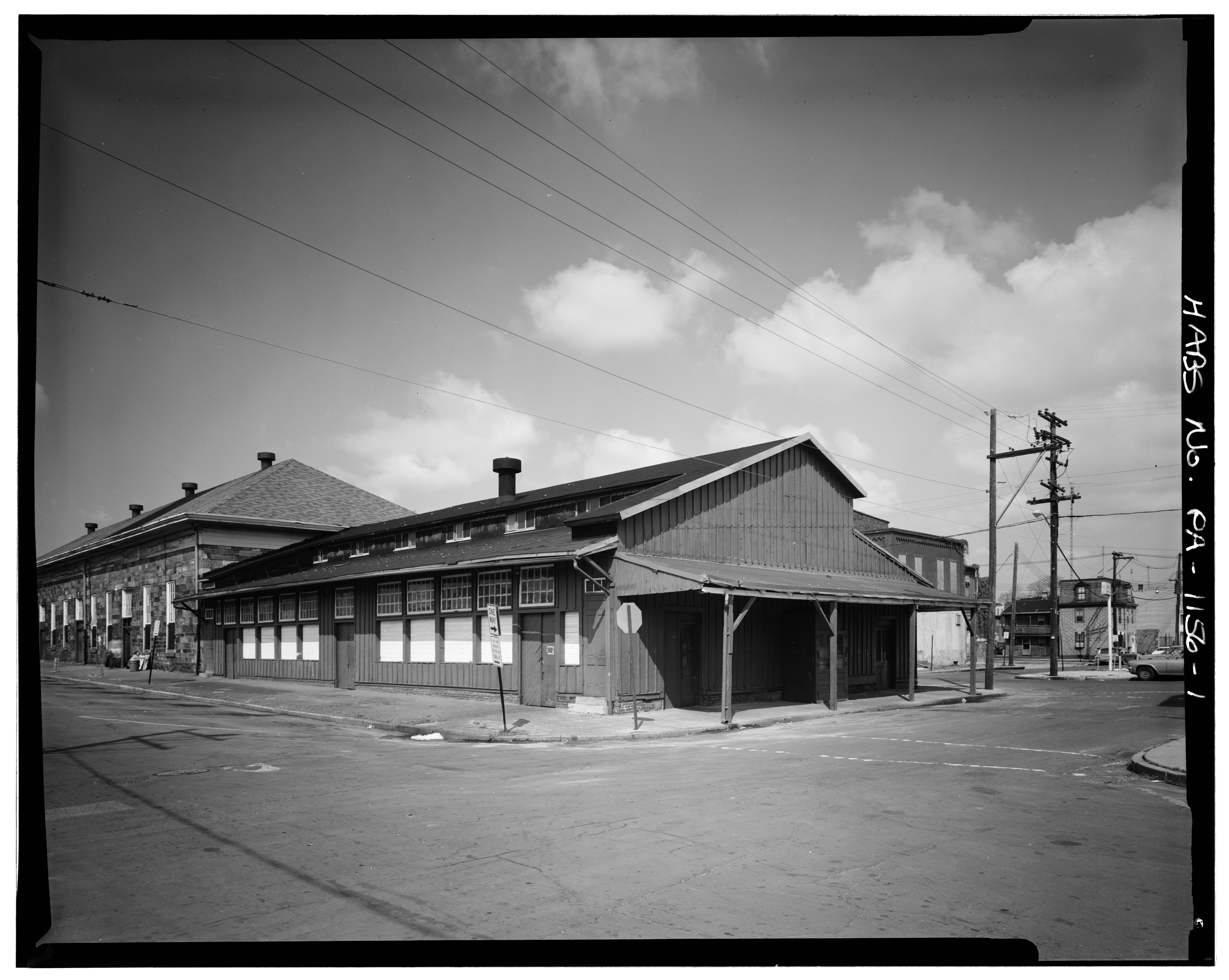
A wood frame wing extending up to the former alleyway bisecting the market block. Photo date unknown.

On April 20, 1860, William K. Verbeke drew up papers to incorporate the West Harrisburg Market Company, in what was then considered West Harrisburg. The market is actually two separate structures. The older Stone Market house was completed in 1863 and held the name "West Harrisburg Market House". The Brick Market house was built between 1874 and 1878. From 1869, a wooden frame wing extension spanned from the Stone Building to the Capitol Street alley until its destruction in 1976-1977.

During the American Civil War, the market helped to feed the 300,000 Union soldiers who mustered through nearby Camp Curtin.

In 1979, ownership of the market was transferred to the City of Harrisburg, which operated the market until 1996 under a city-appointed agency. In 1996, the city completed a $2.5 million award-winning restoration of the Market complex, which was designed to reposition it as a successful and growth-oriented retail enterprise. In 1999, the City completed an additional $380,000 improvement to the stone market house.

It was placed on the National Register of Historic Places in 1974.

A severe fire caused by Rite-Hite HVLS ceiling fan tore through the brick building, nearest to 6th Street, in the early morning hours of July 10, 2023 causing major damage to the roof and a loss of the building contents.

== List of current vendors ==
The following are a current list of vendors as found on the Market's website:

Vendor	Location
Cheesesteak Corner	Stone Building
Cherished Treasures	Tent
Coffee and Crumbs	Tent
Diaspora	Tent
Doggie Delights	Tent
Elementary Coffee Co.	Stone Building
Fisher's Delights	Tent
Goblin Alchemy	Stone Building
Honey Bear Ice Cream	Stone Building
Honeybush	Stone Building
Lil's Pretzels	Tent
Marie's Kitchen Haitian Cuisine	Stone Building
The Meating Place	Tent
Ougi's Cocina	Stone Building
Peach Ridge Produce	Tent
Piper Belle's	Stone Building
Porter's House	Stone Building
Renfield's Jade Garden	Stone Building
Taqueria el Compadre	Stone Building
Tasty Dishes	Stone Building
Taylor Chip	Tent
Tep's Fresh Seafood	Stone Building
Tri Asian Taste	Stone Building
Two Brothers BBQ	Tent
Yami Korean Food	Stone Building
Yum, Yum!	Stone Building
Zeroday Brewing Co.	Stone Building

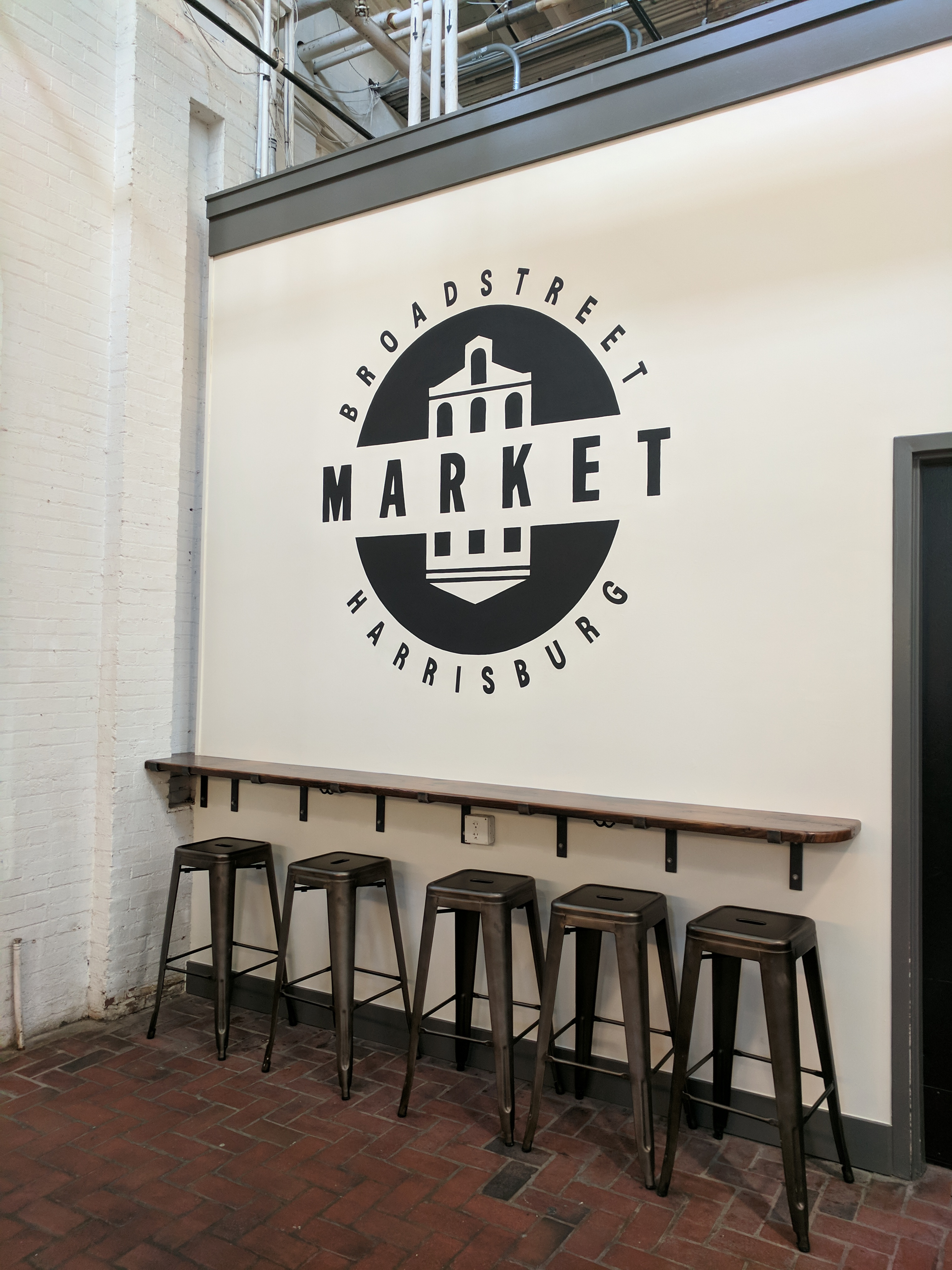
The Market's logo as seen from inside the Brick Building.

== See also ==
- National Register of Historic Places listings in Dauphin County, Pennsylvania
