= Summit Terrace, Harrisburg, Pennsylvania =

Summit Terrace
- Neighborhood of Harrisburg
- Interactive map of Summit Terrace
- Coordinates: 40.26735°N 76.87209°W
- Country: United States
- State: Pennsylvania
- County: Dauphin County
- City: Harrisburg
- ZIP codes: 17103
- Area codes: 717 and 223

Summit Terrace is a historic neighborhood within the Central Allison Hill section of Harrisburg, Pennsylvania. It is bound by State Street, North Thirteenth Street, Bailey Street, North Twelfth Street, and Royal Terrace. Summit Terrace is also the only Architectural Conservation Overlay District (ACOD) in Harrisburg. This ACOD was established in 1998 and has helped to prevent unwanted alterations and new construction from degrading the historic neighborhood.

== History ==
Following the State Capitol Complex expansion into—and demolishing of—the Old Eighth Ward, then continuing with redlining practices in place in the 20th Century, Summit Terrace became a popular area for middle-class and professional blacks to purchase homes. In the 1980s following economic decline in the City, the Summit Terrace neighborhood was described as one of the best examples of city resurgence, which utilized a public-private partnership with the City and strong community action through the 1984 founding of the Summit Terrace Neighborhood Association non-profit by Ruth Curtis. This Association arranged with the city for a park construction, infrastructure upgrades, and coordination of owner-occupied rehabilitation and vacant property rehabilitation assistance programs. This earned the Association an All America City Partnership Award in 1985 and a Heritage Award from the City of Harrisburg in 1986.
