= Scrabble (disambiguation) =

Scrabble is a board word game.

Scrabble may also refer to:

== Related to the board game ==
- Scrabble (game show), an American television show (1984–1990, 1993, 2024)
- Scrabble (video game), various digital adaptations
  - The Computer Edition of Scrabble, 1988, for Apple II, DOS and Mac
  - Scrabble 2007 Edition, for Nintendo DS

== Other uses ==
- Scrabble, West Virginia, United States
- Marc Rzepczynski (born 1985; nickname: Scrabble), American baseball player

== See also ==
- Hardscrabble (disambiguation)
- Scrapple
