= Capitol Heights =

Capitol Heights may refer to some locations in the United States:

- Capitol Heights, Maryland, a town adjacent to Washington, DC
  - Capitol Heights (Washington Metro), a transit station
- Capitol Heights (Harrisburg), a neighborhood in Harrisburg, Pennsylvania
