= John A. F. Hall =

American politician

Member of the Pennsylvania House of Representatives from the Middle District district
- In office 1923–1928

Mayor of Harrisburg
- In office 1935–1937
- Preceded by: George A. Hoverter
- Succeeded by: Howard E. Milliken

Personal details
- Born: John Augustus Fritchey Hall; July 8, 1890 Harrisburg, Pennsylvania, U.S.
- Died: March 9, 1949 (age 58)
- Resting place: Harrisburg Cemetery
- Party: Republican
- Spouse: Helen I.
- Children: John A.F. Jr.
- Education: Ph.B., Dickinson College, 1912

John Augustus Fritchey Hall (July 8, 1890 – March 9, 1949) was an American WWI sailor with the North Bombing Squadron, English teacher, lawyer, judicial appointee, and politician who served as Republican in the Pennsylvania House of Representatives and Mayor of Harrisburg, Pennsylvania. In 1947, Hall was president of the Dauphin County Bar Association. The Harrisburg Housing Authority, established in 1938, named the public housing complex John A. F. Hall Manor after Hall in 1953.

Political offices
Preceded by George A. Hoverter	Mayor of Harrisburg, Pennsylvania; 1936–1940	Succeeded by Howard E. Milliken
