= East Harrisburg, Pennsylvania =

East Harrisburg
- Neighborhood of Harrisburg
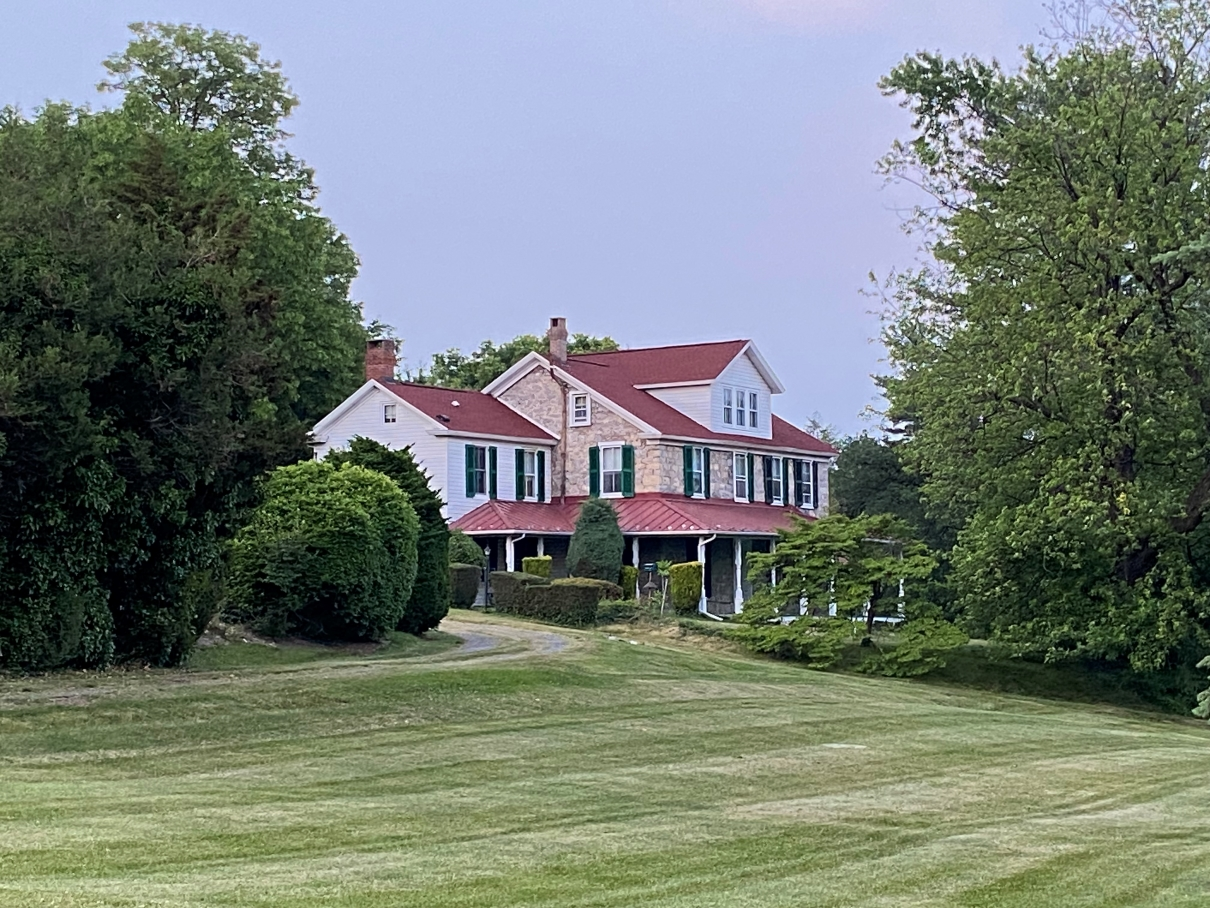
- The historic Parson John Elder House, built 1740, at S. 24th Street & Ellerslie Street
- Interactive map of East Harrisburg
- Coordinates: 40.26426°N 76.84747°W
- Country: United States
- State: Pennsylvania
- County: Dauphin County
- City: Harrisburg
- ZIP codes: 17104, 17111
- Area codes: 717 and 223

East Harrisburg is a district of neighborhoods in the eastern end of Harrisburg, Pennsylvania. Its southern border is formed by Interstate 83; eastern border is Paxtang along 29th Street; northern border is Market Street and the borough of Penbrook; western border is the Allison Hill neighborhood along 21st Street and including Bellevue Park. The historic former private Bishop McDevitt High School, current public John Harris High School, Kline Plaza shopping center, historic Parson John Elder House, and Paxtang Park are located in East Harrisburg. The Parson John Elder house, built in 1740 for John Elder of Paxtang, is actually the oldest structure in what is now city limits. In 1951, J.W. Kline constructed the Kline Village Shopping Center, in what was considered Harrisburg's first modern shopping center.

The neighboring Borough of Penbrook was once officially named East Harrisburg. It still maintains a Harrisburg postal ZIP code.

== See also ==
- East Harrisburg Cemetery
- List of Harrisburg neighborhoods
