= Harrisburg incinerator =

Waste-to-energy incinerator in Pennsylvania, US

Harrisburg Incinerator
- Country: United States
- Location: Harrisburg, Pennsylvania
- Coordinates: 40.244055°N 76.853882°W
- Status: Operational
- Commission date: 1972
- Owner: LCSWMA
- Operator: Reworld

Thermal power station
- Primary fuel: Waste
- Site area: 59 acres (24 ha)

Power generation
- Nameplate capacity: 24.1 MW

External links
- Website: Facility website

The Harrisburg Incinerator, now under private operation as Susquehanna Resource Management Complex (SRMC), is a waste-to-energy incinerator in South Harrisburg, Pennsylvania built and operated by the city from 1972 to 2003, which was an ongoing source of contention due to toxic air emissions and unforeseen costs which greatly contributed to the bankruptcy of the city. Since December 23, 2013, it is now owned by Lancaster County Solid Waste Management Authority (LCSWMA) and operated by Reworld.

== History ==
Harrisburg City Council approved the $4.9 million project in September 1966, but on December 22, 1969, construction began on the incinerator at a cost of $12.5 million. Mayor Al Straub was quoted as calling it "the Rolls-Royce of incinerators." The trash-to-steam incinerator was completed in 1972, but after repeated breakdowns, the cost rose to $30 million, and in 1983 a separate $3 million repair was required, plus a projected $1.7 million deficit. Though it was built to handle 720 tons daily, it consistently operated under a capacity for profit, as neighboring municipalities declined to participate—some before construction began. Mayor Harold A. Swenson described it as "a facility that far exceeds our needs and our ability to pay." The US Environmental Protection Agency shut down the incinerator for pollution on December 18, 2000, but was reopened through a loophole less than a month later, with the condition that it close within 2.5 years. On June 18, 2003, the incinerator was closed, though Mayor Stephen R. Reed planned to rebuild a new one. Over the course of the incinerators total operation, numerous problems arose with the incinerator which would lead the city of Harrisburg to file for bankruptcy in 2011 after debts accumulated of up to $400 million accrued mostly as a result of the incinerator.

=== Harrisburg's incinerator dioxin ===
For the three decades it was running, the incinerator was the "highest emitter of dioxin in the country" according to Jim Topsale, a municipal waste combustion expert for the EPA. Dioxins are very toxic and according to the World Health Organization, they can cause "reproductive and developmental problems, damage the immune system, interfere with hormones and also cause cancer." Eric Epstein, an environmental activist, accused the Pennsylvania Department of Environmental Protection of environmental racism because the incinerator was located near two low-income housing projects which had a high minority population.

=== 2000 Dioxin Arctic study ===
In September 2000, a study published by the North American Commission on Environmental Cooperation (NACEC), led by Barry Commoner, found that Inuit women in the Arctic in Nunavut, Canada were found to have high levels of dioxin in their breast milk. The study tracked the origin of the dioxins using computer models from the sources that produced it and found that the dioxin pollution in the Arctic originated from the United States. Out of 44,000 sources of dioxin polluters in the United States, they found that only 19 were contributing to greater than a third of the dioxin pollution in Nunavut. Out of these 19, Harrisburg's incinerator was the #1 source of dioxin pollution in the Arctic.
