= South Allison Hill, Harrisburg, Pennsylvania =

South Allison Hill
- Neighborhood of Harrisburg
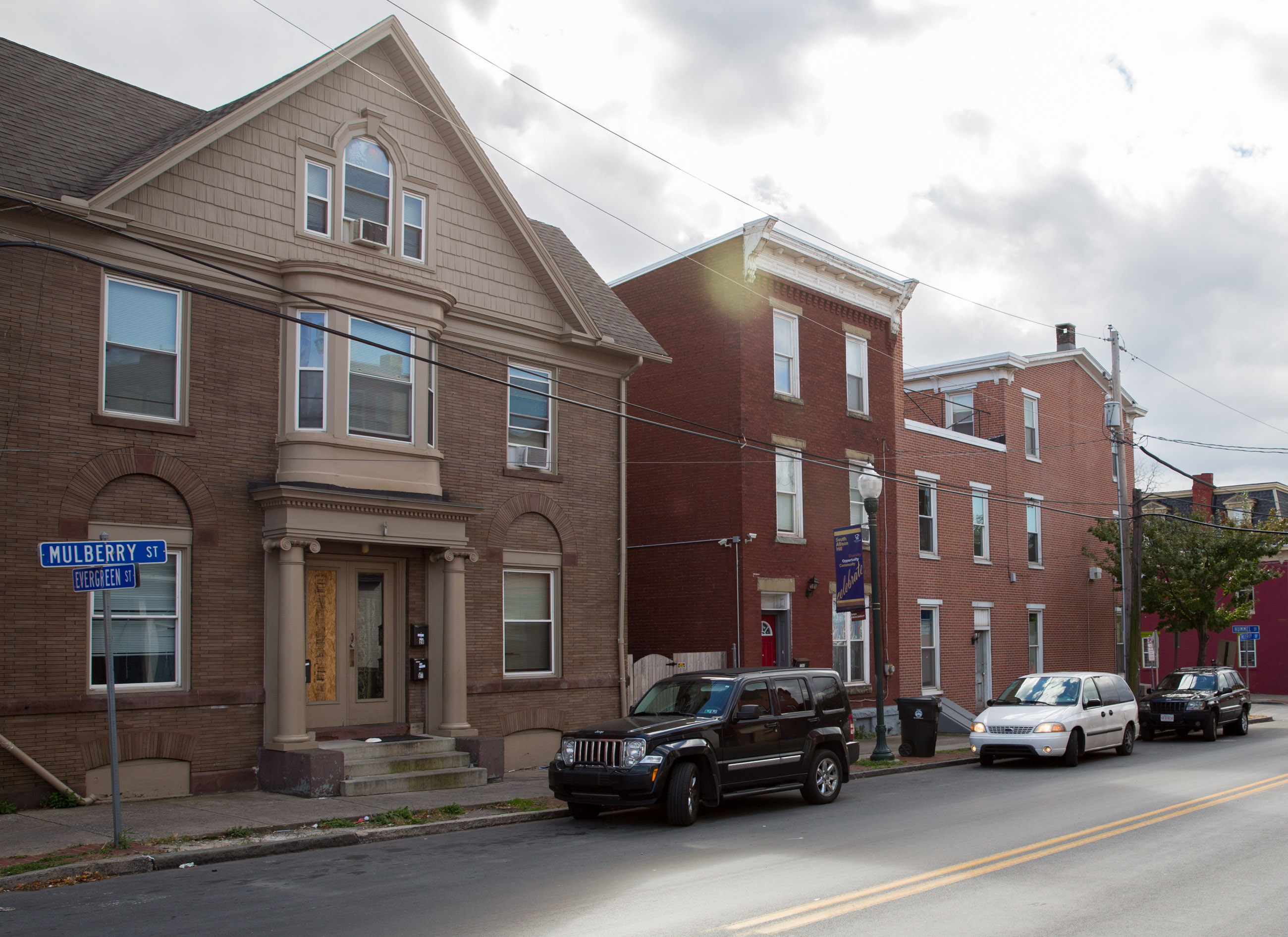
- Mulberry St & Evergreen St in the South Allison Hill neighborhood in 2016
- Interactive map of South Allison Hill
- Coordinates: 40.26313°N 76.86942°W
- Country: United States
- State: Pennsylvania
- County: Dauphin County
- City: Harrisburg
- ZIP Code: 17104
- Area codes: 717 and 223

South Allison Hill is a neighborhood of the Allison Hill section of Harrisburg, Pennsylvania. It is bordered by Cameron Street to the west, South 18th Street to the east, Market Street to the north, and Paxton Street to the south. South Allison Hill is home to over 6,000 residents, about 2,700 building parcels as well as dozens of nonprofit organizations, faith-based institutions, and a large number of local businesses reflecting the diverse population. Considered by Harrisburg Magazine a "haven for multicultural provisions," South Allison Hill's grocery stores each have a uniqueness "that confirms the ethnic diversity for which South Allison Hill is known."

== History ==
Allison Hill was built sitting on top of a bluff overlooking downtown Harrisburg with views of the Pennsylvania State Capitol. What began as a vast country-side soon became the booming industrial heart of the city in the late 19th century. The factory buildings and row homes built for workers display an impressive mixture of Victorian architecture making it home to the largest national historic district in Harrisburg. Deindustrialization began in the 1970's and affected the community with disinvestment that peaked in 1992. Since then, the City's government has enacted multiple community action plans and the community has seen a resurgence in housing and population. However, it has a higher crime rate than most neighborhoods within Harrisburg and has a significant number of residents living below the poverty level. The Harrisburg Bureau of Police operates a Police Substation in South Allison Hill to build community relations, deter crime, and reduce response times for calls. Multiple community groups and nonprofits are currently in a renaissance period with residents to facilitate better education, physical environment, safety, and recreation. In the past decade, improvements have made a measurable difference and residents report a strong sense of community and identity.

== Demographics ==
In the 2010 Census, South Allison Hill had a population of 6,612. According to the 2011-2015 American Community Survey, those who identify as Hispanic make up 40% of the population, making it the largest Hispanic neighborhood in the region. Racial identity consists of 40% African American, 26% White, and 31% who identify as two or more races or some other race. The median income was $24,692.

Since 1969, the neighborhood has been served by Hamilton Health Center, a sizable regional clinic.
