= Mount Pleasant Historic District (Harrisburg, Pennsylvania) =

Historic district in Pennsylvania, United States

- U.S. National Register of Historic Places
- U.S. Historic district
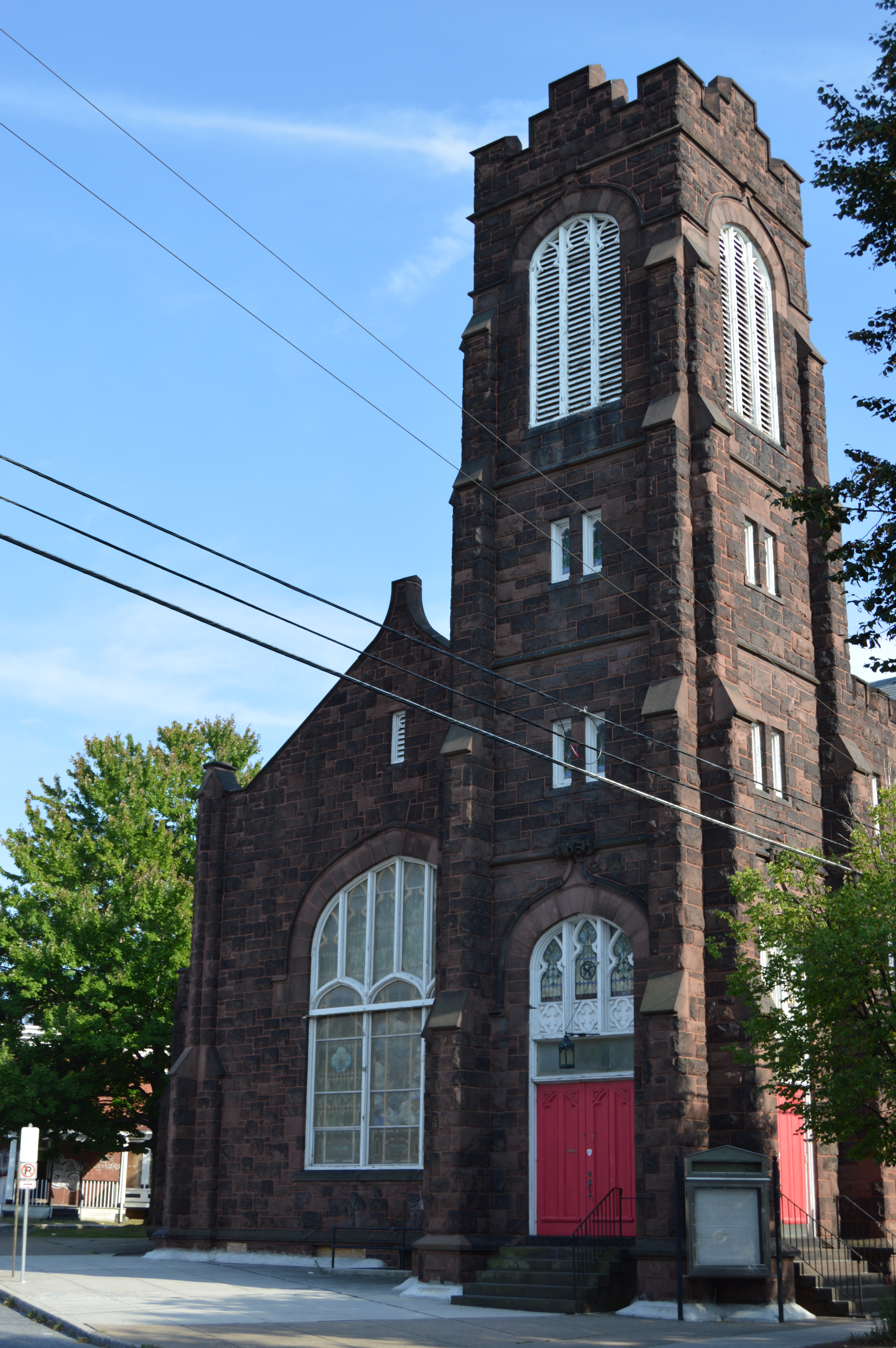
- The former B.E. Stevens Methodist Church at Thirteenth and Vernon

- Location within Pennsylvania
- Location: Harrisburg, Pennsylvania
- Coordinates: 40°15′44″N 76°51′56″W
- Area: 50 acres (20 ha)
- Architect: A. Boyd Hamilton, et al.
- Architectural style: Greek Revival, Second Empire, Queen Anne, Late Victorian
- NRHP reference No.: 85000079; 90000710 (increase)
- Added to NRHP: January 11, 1985; May 9, 1990 (increase)

The Mount Pleasant Historic District is an historic district and neighborhood in the western part of the Allison Hill neighborhood of Harrisburg, Pennsylvania. It is located from Market to Brookwood and Allison Hill Bluff to 19th street. Home to mostly Victorian architecture in considerable variety and ornate detail, it is the oldest section of Allison Hill, and represents Harrisburg's early development to the east of downtown.

It was entered onto the National Register of Historic Places in 1985.

== History ==
An industry-centered community that was developed between 1880 and 1920 with views of the city of city's commercial and government operations, this area of Harrisburg evolved into a mixture of the typical, working-class brick and wood-construction rowhouses of the area, mansions owned by prominent, late nineteenth and early twentieth-century manufacturers, churches, schools, and industrial structures that were built near the railroad line. It is a prime example of a neighborhood created by and for Harrisburg residents to combine work, residence, commerce and transportation densely together into a cohesive community.

Among the structures included in the district are the Derry Street United Methodist Church at 1508 Derry Street, which was built in 1908 and known, originally, as the Derry Street United Brethren and Evangelical Church, and the Beidleman House at 1225 Market Street (demolished April 2022), which was built in 1906 for Edward E. Beidleman, a prominent, twentieth-century politician and attorney.

== Places of note ==
- Carson Stamm Mansion
- McFarland Press Building
- Old Webster Elementary School
- Sylvan Heights Mansion

== See also ==
- List of Harrisburg neighborhoods
- National Register of Historic Places listings in Dauphin County, Pennsylvania
