= Simon Cameron House =

Historic house in Pennsylvania, United States

- John Harris – Simon Cameron House
- U.S. National Register of Historic Places
- U.S. National Historic Landmark
- Pennsylvania state historical marker
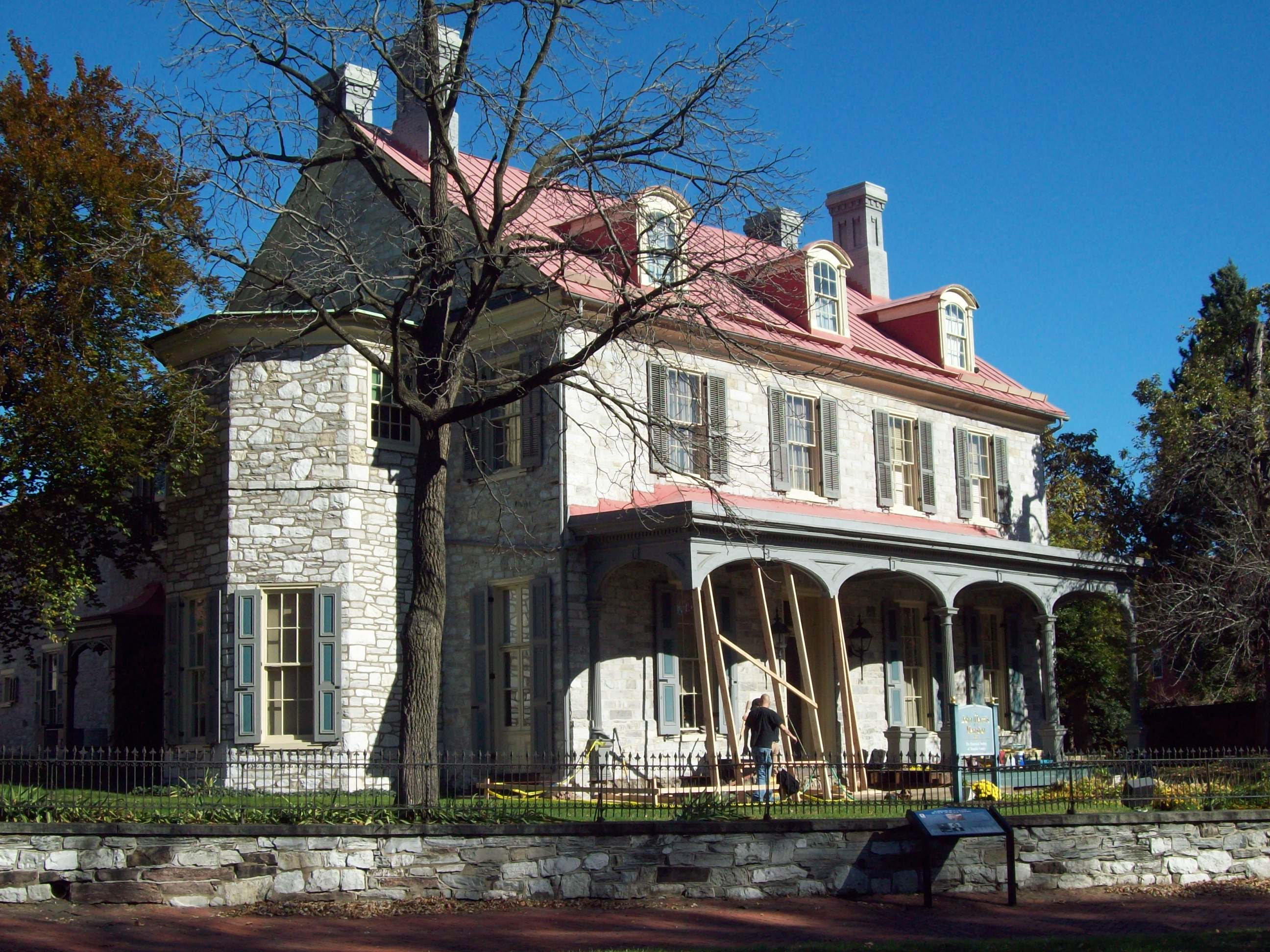
- John Harris – Simon Cameron House, November 2010

- Location within Pennsylvania Location within the United States
- Interactive map showing the location of Simon Cameron House
- Location: 219 S. Front St., Harrisburg, Pennsylvania
- Coordinates: 40°15′24″N 76°52′44″W
- Area: less than one acre
- Built: 1766
- Architect: John Harris, Jr.
- Architectural style: Georgian
- Website: dauphincountyhistory.org
- NRHP reference No.: 73001620

Significant dates
- Added to NRHP: September 20, 1973
- Designated NHL: May 15, 1975
- Designated PHMC: August 23, 1946

The Simon Cameron House, also known as John Harris Mansion and the Harris–Cameron Mansion, is a historic house museum at 219 South Front Street in Harrisburg, Pennsylvania, United States. Built in 1766 and repeatedly extended and altered, it is one of Harrisburg's oldest buildings, and is nationally notable as the summer residence of Simon Cameron (1799–1889), an influential Republican Party politician during and after the American Civil War. The house and family items were donated to the Historical Society of Dauphin County in 1941, which now operates it as a museum. The mansion was declared a National Historic Landmark in 1975, and is located in the Harrisburg Historic District.

== Description and history ==
The Simon Cameron House stands south of the central business district of Harrisburg, overlooking the Susquehanna River from the north side of South Front Street between Washington and Mary Streets. Its main block is a 2 1/2-story stone structure, with a side gable roof. It is built out of mortared limestone, and is fronted by a single-story porch with fluted columns and arched Victorian valances. The main facade is four bays wide, with the main entrance in the center-left bay, topped by a tall transom window. Three gabled dormers pierce the front roof face. A long two-story ell extends the main block to the rear, giving the house an overall off-center T shape.

The house was built about 1766 by John Harris Jr., son of one of the first settlers of the region, and for whose father Harrisburg is named. The house remained in the Harris family until 1835. In 1853 it was adapted for use as the Pennsylvania Female College, which was forced into bankruptcy in 1861, due to turmoil caused by the American Civil War. It was then purchased by Simon Cameron, who had been on the college's board of directors. Cameron had recently resigned as United States Secretary of War, over a scandal involving fraudulent supply contracts. Cameron had entered politics in 1829, and the taint of corruption had followed him through many of his offices. He won election to the United States Senate in 1867, which helped consolidate his control over federal patronage money in Pennsylvania. In this role he was successful in purging reform-oriented Radical Republican elements from the administration of President Ulysses S. Grant, and became an influential member of Grant's "kitchen cabinet." Cameron was responsible for transforming the existing house to give its present Victorian character. Cameron's heirs donated the house to the Historical Society of Dauphin County in 1941.

== See also ==
- National Register of Historic Places listings in Dauphin County, Pennsylvania
- List of the oldest buildings in Pennsylvania
- List of National Historic Landmarks in Pennsylvania
