= Engleton, Harrisburg, Pennsylvania =

Coordinates: 40.27235°N 76.89089°W

Engleton
- Neighborhood of Harrisburg
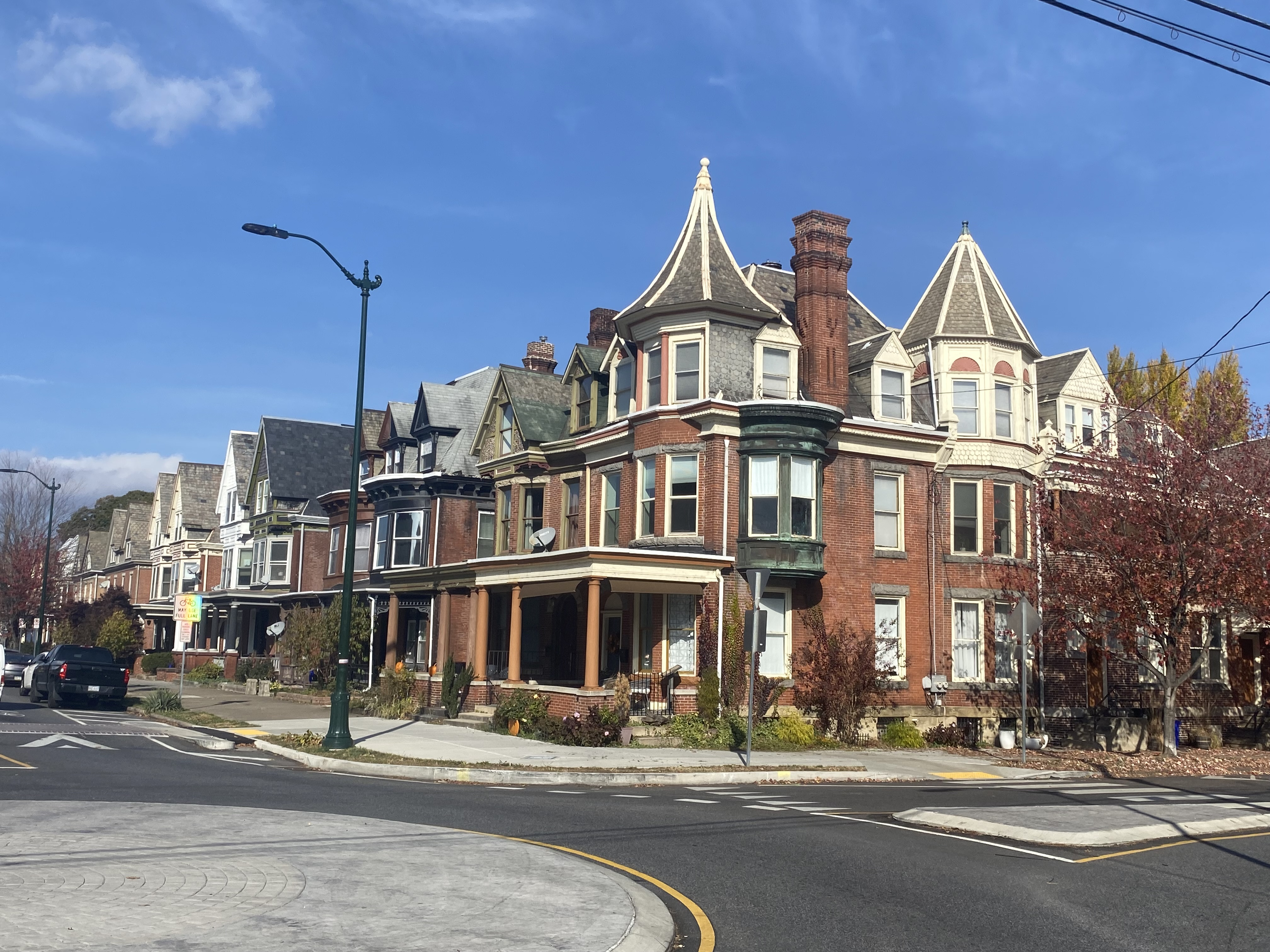
- North Second Street & Reily Street
- Interactive map of Engleton
- Country: United States
- State: Pennsylvania
- County: Dauphin County
- City: Harrisburg
- ZIP code: 17102
- Area codes: 717 and 223

Engleton (also spelled Engletown) is a section of the Midtown Harrisburg, Pennsylvania neighborhood created with a focus on architectural variety. It is roughly bounded by 2nd street to the west, Kelker Street to the north, 3rd street to the east and Reily Street to the south. Its Queen Anne and Italianate style homes were built in the 1890s by Benjamin H. Engle, who is the namesake of the area. Market appeal for these homes was created by varying the colors and treatments of the façades.

Engleton contains one Historic Place on the National Register, the Simon Cameron School.

== History ==
In the 1890s, Harrisburg's population was growing at a fast pace. Speculative builder Benjamin H. Engle, who was newly the owner of the Central Mill & Lumber Company by 1892, purchased a large tract of land north of Reily Street and wanted to create a new neighborhood. Knowing that a focus on architectural diversity would help the neighborhood thrive, supervising architect Melancthon S. Shotwell weaved masonry and wood frame styles to create a unique housing stock that differed from the contemporary flat-walled row construction which was commonplace. The neighborhood became a success before the turn of the century, and the arrival of the streetcar along Third Street furthered it.
