= Capitol Heights, Harrisburg, Pennsylvania =

Capitol Heights
- Neighborhood of Harrisburg
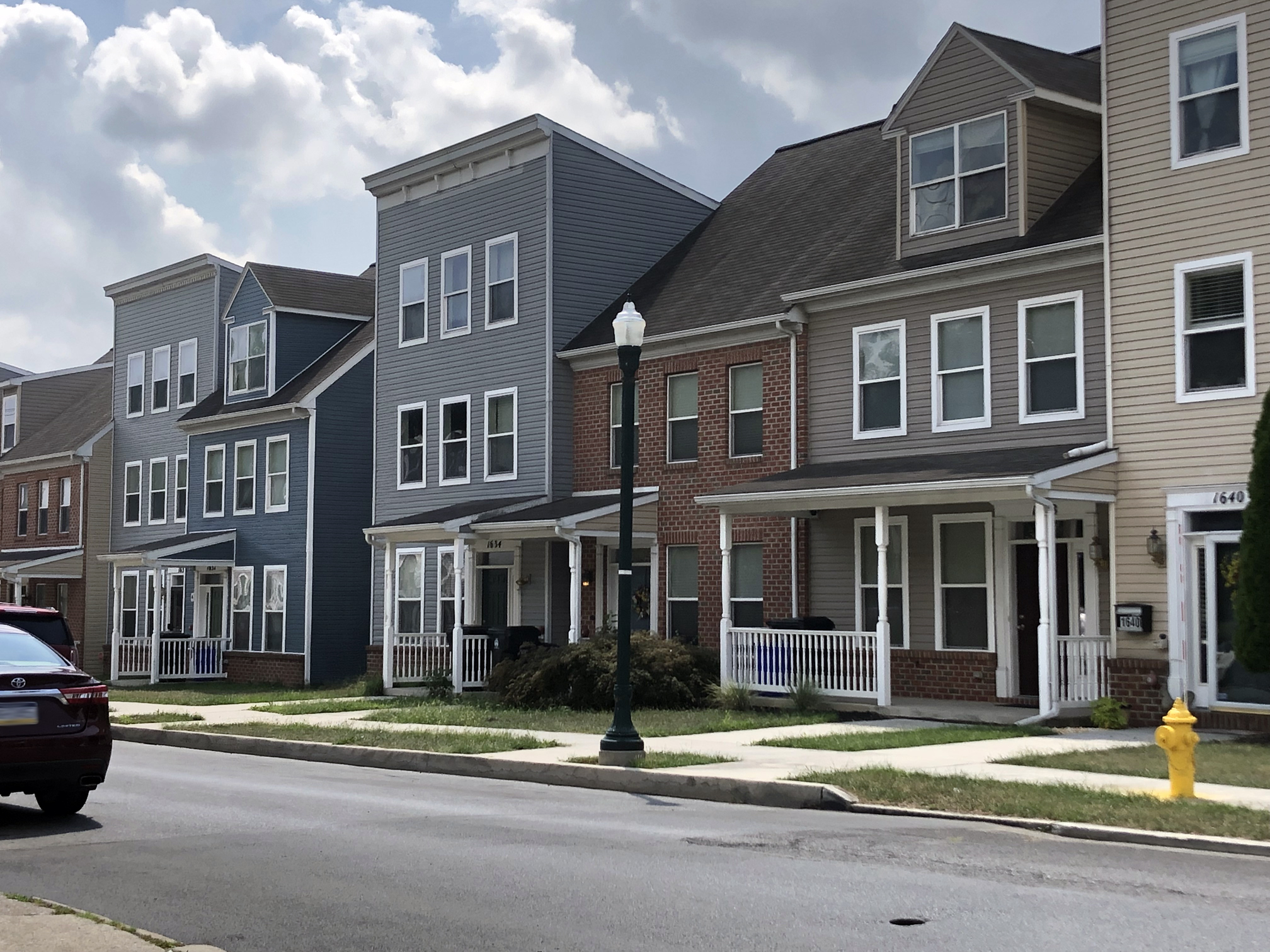
- Capitol Heights housing stock in 2022
- Interactive map of Capitol Heights
- Coordinates: 40.2755°N 76.8898°W
- Country: United States
- State: Pennsylvania
- County: Dauphin County
- City: Harrisburg
- ZIP Codes: 17102
- Area codes: 717 and 223

Capitol Heights is a community of over 300 townhouse and single-family duplexes in the Midtown neighborhood of Harrisburg, Pennsylvania. Most of the new homes are located east of Third between Kelker and Reily and along Fulton, 4th and 5th street. The neighborhood is known for its generic suburban-style architecture fitted to the existing street grid. The area was previously referred to informally as "Lottsville" due to its many abandoned and vacant lots, so the City and private developers worked together in the 2000s for large-scale redevelopment as it was a targeted area for demolition and urban renewal. As revitalization was completed in the early 2010s, the intense level of change and influx of capital resulted in much lower vacancy rates and higher land values. Another phased project in 2021 was introduced to develop over 100 new parcels and add a community center.
