= Hardscrabble, Harrisburg, Pennsylvania =

Hardscrabble
- Neighborhood of Harrisburg
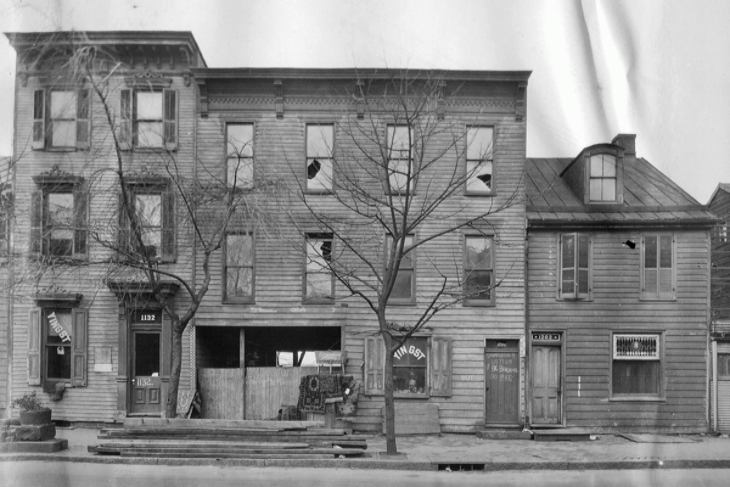
- A section of Harrisburg’s Hardscrabble neighborhood along the western side of Front Street.
- Interactive map of Hardscrabble
- Country: United States
- State: Pennsylvania
- County: Dauphin County
- City: Harrisburg

Hardscrabble was a small settlement of mostly frame structures in Midtown Harrisburg, Pennsylvania from late 18th century to 1924, so named because of its reputation as a rough place.

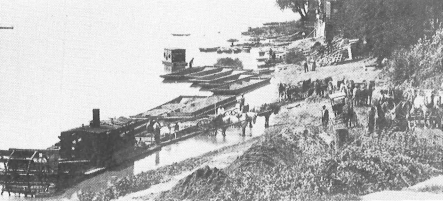
Hardscrabble district along the Susquehanna River west of Front Street. It was replaced by the Sunken Gardens.

It was bounded by the Susquehanna River to the west, Calder Street to the north, Herr Street to the South and overlapping Front street to the east. Due to the prominence of the logging industry at the time, it was a riverside congregation area for the workers containing boat liveries, lumber mills and other business related to the river trade. Upon the decline of logging and river coal dredging, the area fell into disrepair by the early 20th Century. In the midst of the City Beautiful Movement in the early 1900s, the City Council was working to improve the city by paving streets and erecting steps on and paving the esplanade along Riverfront Park. Because the settlement was impeding part of the city map's plan for Front Street—which had never been formally opened to date—Ross A. Hickok of the Harrisburg League of Municipal Improvements proposed to eliminate the area in the early 1910s. Referred to by the Harrisburg Telegraph in 1915 as "The Gap in the Steps," Hardscrabble was "the only unsightly interruption in the magnificent line of the 'front steps of Harrisburg.'" After the members of the seaside community collectively denied repeated attempts by the City to purchase their homes, the City took them to court for eminent domain. The neighborhood was condemned by the City in 1915, and City Council awarded more than $64,000 (over $1.7m in 2021 dollars) in damages to property owners, decided upon by square footage of property. Litigation ensued until residents eventually were forced to vacate the premises in 1921. Among the displaced were the A. P. Dintaman and Harry J. Berrier boat pavilions, which housed over 500 canoes and watercraft. By 1924, the settlement was ultimately demolished and the basement foundations for some of the homes were kept to be transformed into the Sunken Gardens.
