= Hall Manor, Harrisburg, Pennsylvania =

John A. F. Hall Manor
- Neighborhood of Harrisburg
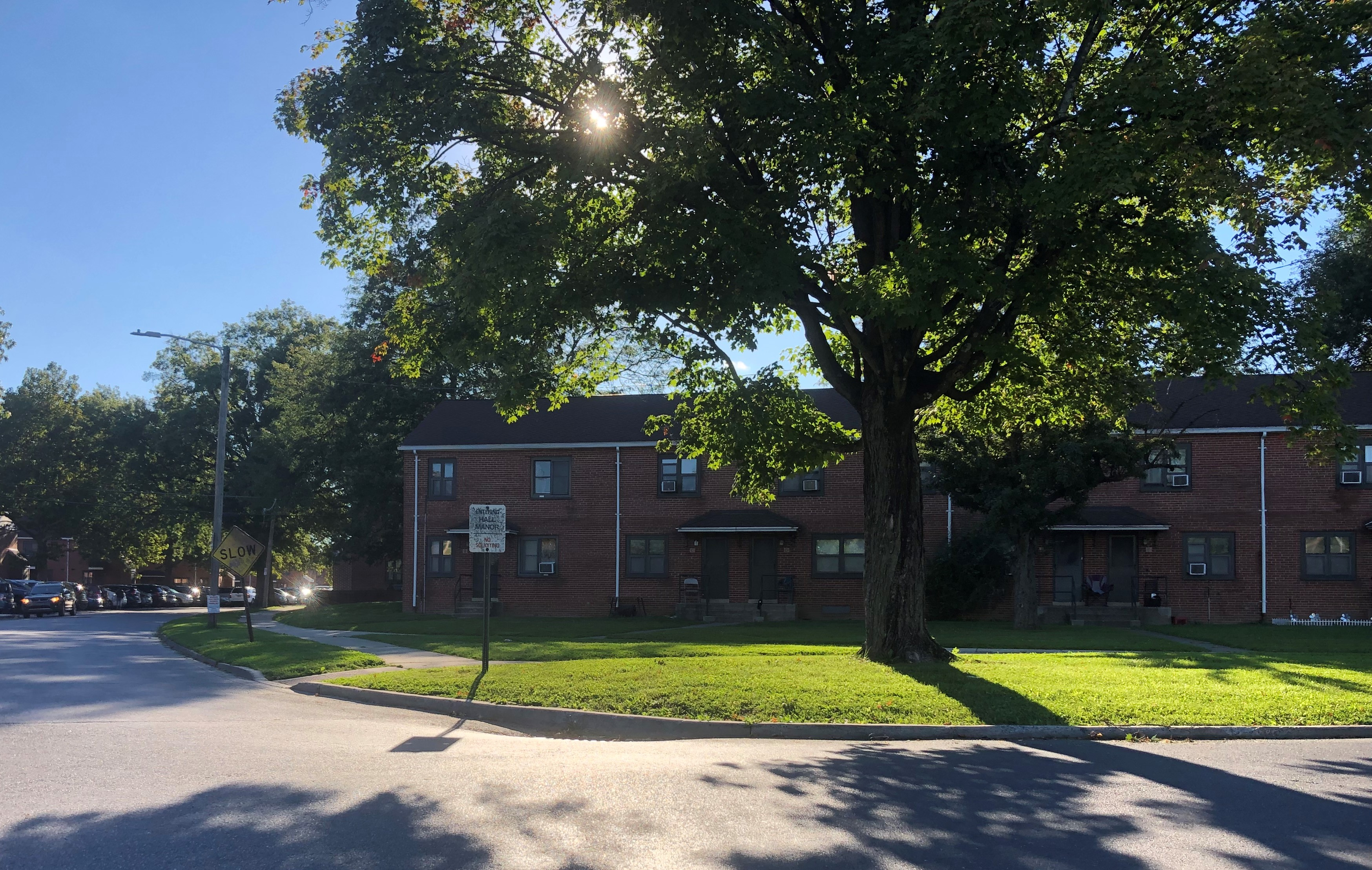
- Section of John A. F. Hall Manor as seen from 17th Street
- Interactive map of John A. F. Hall Manor
- Coordinates: 40.2500°N 76.8577°W
- Country: United States
- State: Pennsylvania
- County: Dauphin County
- City: Harrisburg
- Established: 1953

Area
  - Total: 43.000 acres (17.4015 ha)
- ZIP codes: 17104
- Area codes: 717 and 223

The John A. F. Hall Manor is a neighborhood of mixed-income housing in South Harrisburg, Pennsylvania. Managed by the Harrisburg Housing Authority, it was named after former mayor John A. F. Hall. It is the city's largest housing project. Hall Manor was initially a tight-knit, low-income community where families recalled a safe and vibrant upbringing, but has suffered from increased crime in recent decades.

== History and architectural features ==
Built in 1953, there are five hundred and forty apartments in fifty-four buildings, which are spread over forty-three acres.

The HHA plans to re-submit an application for a planning grant under the Choice Neighborhood Program, and apply funds to reconfigure the neighborhood with more vibrant amenities currently non-existent, and eventually redevelop it in the long term.

In the adjacent John N. Hall Club House (named after unrelated John Newton Hall, a late civic philanthropist from Camp Hill) is one of the Harrisburg Boys & Girls Clubs of America locations. Also present is a community center with day-care and on-site family services and medical facilities.
