= Midtown, Harrisburg =

Midtown
- Neighborhood of Harrisburg
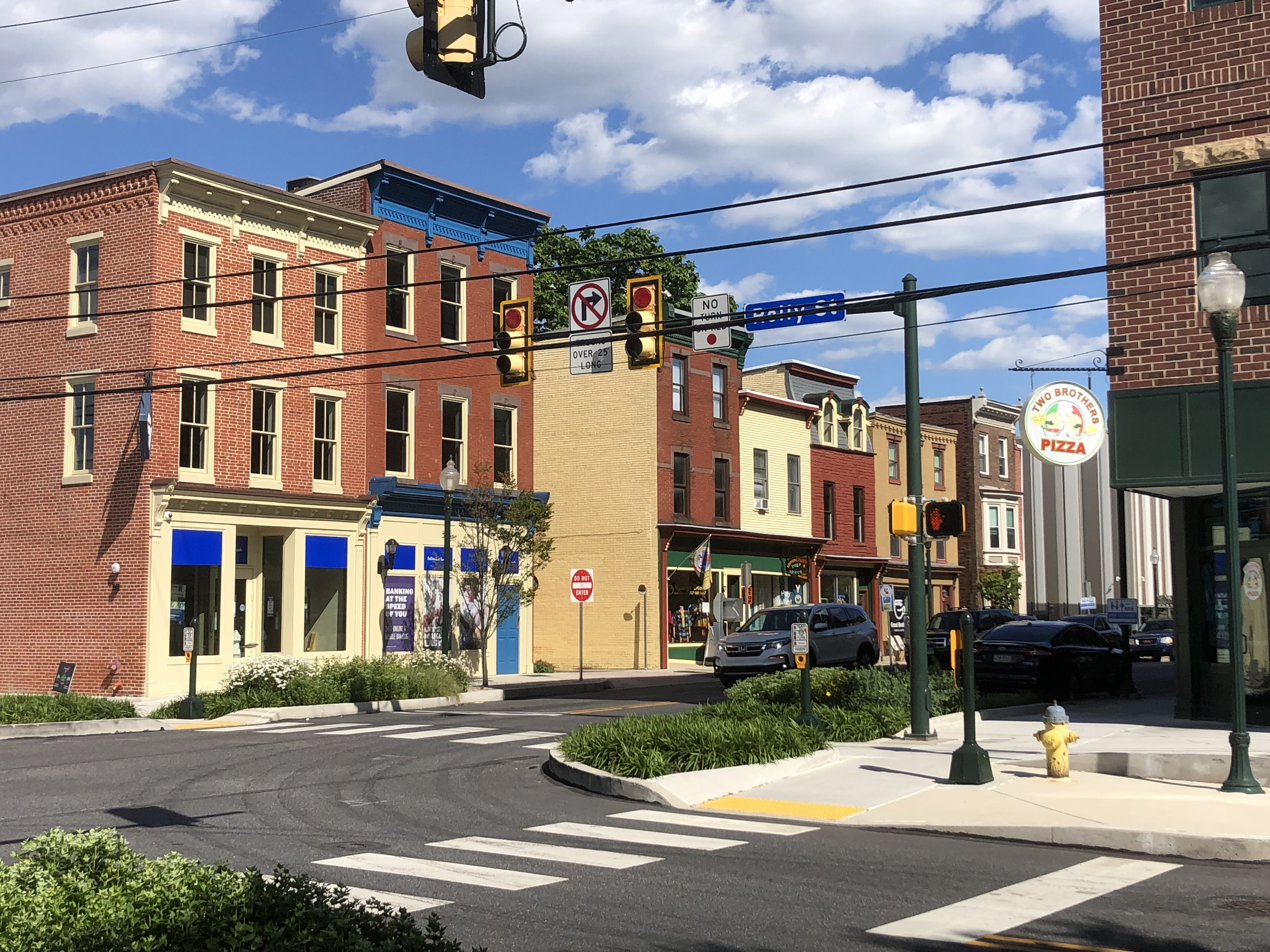
- Midtown Harrisburg as seen from the corner of 3rd & Reily Streets
- Interactive map of Midtown
- Coordinates: 40.2728°N 76.8892°W
- Country: United States
- State: Pennsylvania
- County: Dauphin County
- City: Harrisburg
- Area codes: 717, 223

Midtown is a neighborhood in Harrisburg, Pennsylvania. Its zip code is 17102. The Midtown neighborhood is delineated by Forster Street to the south, Maclay Street to the north, 7th Street to the east, and the Susquehanna River to the west. Former Harrisburg Mayor William K. Verbeke is the namesake for Verbeke Street (formerly Broad Street) and first bought and developed the area. Midtown is home to the Pennsylvania Governor's Residence (at its boundary with Uptown) and the Broad Street Market, the oldest continually operated street market in the country.

Midtown became named as such following World War II as state government construction expanded further north from the Capitol District. By 1977 the Midtown Square Action Council was established, and starting with the 1980s revitalization began and has continued since.

The section of Midtown from Reily to Kelker Streets and 2nd to 3rd Streets is known as Engleton. Its Queen Anne style homes were built in the 1890s by Benjamin Engle. The Old Uptown, Old Midtown, and Old Fox Ridge historic districts listed on the National Register of Historic Places are all contained within the Midtown neighborhood.

Old Uptown is a neighborhood of large homes built in the early 1900s between Kelker and Maclay streets. Much of this neighborhood lies within the Old Uptown Historic District.

== Demographics ==
As of the 2010 census there were 7,628 people living in Midtown. The racial makeup of Midtown was 53.4% White, 36.6% Black or African-American, 2.3% Asian and 8.4% were Hispanic or Latino of any race. Persons aged 25–29 make up a large portion of the total population, at 13.6%. Approximately 5.5% of the total population consists of unmarried partners.

== Education and culture ==
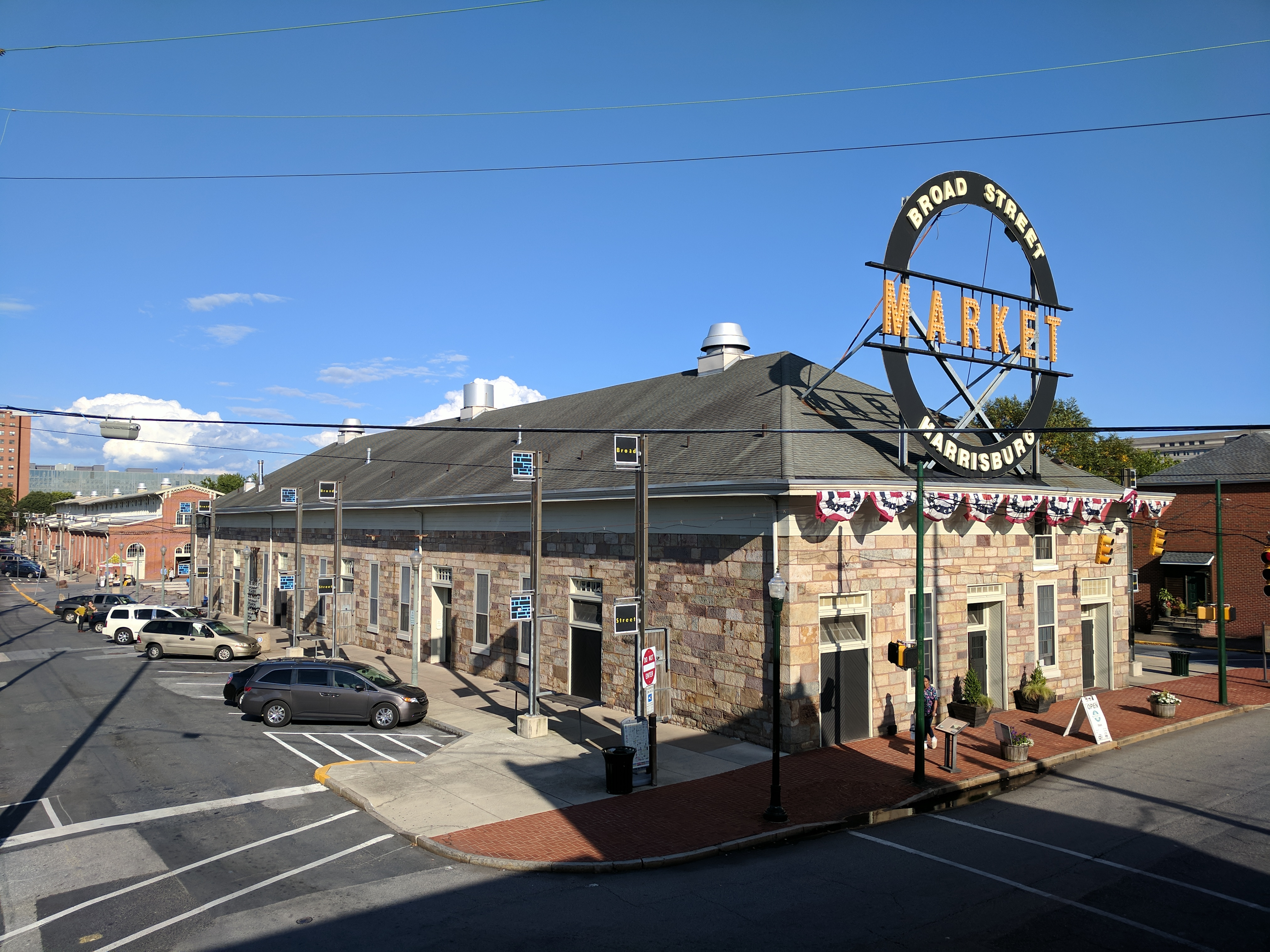
The Broad Street Market on 3rd & Verbeke Streets

Formerly at the corner 3rd and Reily streets, the Midtown Scholar Bookstore and Famous Reading Cafe opened in 2008 and subsequently expanded to the corner of Verbeke. Considered the largest used academic bookstore between Chicago and New York, it contains thousands of used books, scholarly and otherwise from a wide range of fields.

The Midtown Cinema movie theater is Harrisburg's only first-run independent and foreign film theater.

In 2007, Harrisburg Area Community College opened its new Midtown campus at the corner of 3rd and Reilly streets in the renovated Evangelical Press Building. The building holds many of the college's technical programs and has a capacity to hold several hundred students. From 2019 to 2022, HACC began to leave its Midtown 2 building by the end of its lease, opting to relocate the programming to its main Wildwood campus to save money.

Midtown is known for its sizable LGBTQ population, while most of Harrisburg's gay bars and establishments are actually in the Capitol District on the edge of Midtown.

The former Harrisburg Midtown Arts Center (H•MAC) building, which built upon what was a Police Athletic League building and former residence on Third Street, operated two performance venues with a bar and restaurant prior to its closure in 2026.

== Economic decline and gentrification ==
Much of Midtown fell into disrepair in the 1970s and 1980s after the Hurricane Agnes floods which damaged many homes, especially in the Old Uptown area. However, since the 1990s the neighborhood has gentrified drastically especially along the Penn and Green street corridors. This is primarily due to a strong housing stock for renovation and proximity to the Central Business District, which has been experiencing growth itself. Today, gentrification is spreading as many historic homes are being renovated throughout the northern and eastern part of Midtown.

== See also ==
- List of Harrisburg neighborhoods
