= Bellevue Park, Harrisburg, Pennsylvania =

Coordinates: 40.2705°N 76.8540°W

Bellevue Park
- Neighborhood of Harrisburg
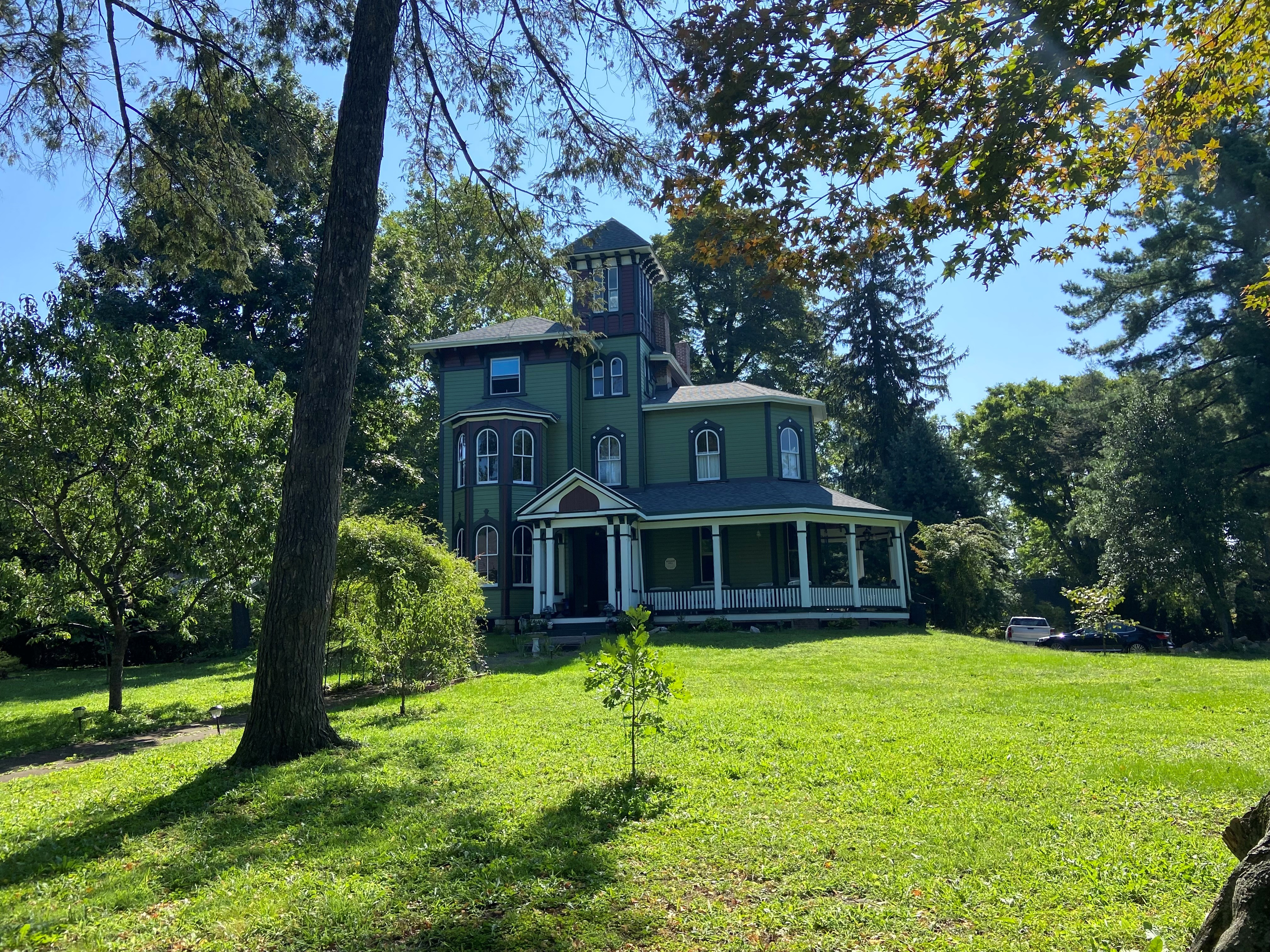
- Breeze Hill Mansion located on 21st and Bellevue Streets, Harrisburg, Pennsylvania
- Interactive map of Bellevue Park
- Country: United States
- State: Pennsylvania
- County: Dauphin County
- City: Harrisburg

Area
  - Total: 134 acres (54 ha)
- Area codes: 717 and 223
- Website: Neighborhood Website

Bellevue Park, is a neighborhood in East Harrisburg, Pennsylvania. It is known as Pennsylvania’s first fully planned residential community. Bellevue Park is characterized by winding lanes, wooded topography, underground utilities and period street lighting. Impressive mansions and open preserves are protected by stringent covenants.

== History ==
Bellevue Park was acquired in 1907 by the Union Real Estate Investment Company (consisting of Herman P. Miller and other investors) from the 1876 homestead and vineyard of Jacob Haehnlen ("Belle Vue Farm"). In 1909 Warren H. Manning of Boston area, a preeminent landscape designer, published a residential lot plan, which resulted in central Pennsylvania's first landscaped suburb. Nationally known horticulturalist, environmentalist and publisher J. Horace McFarland purchased the first lot. The neighborhood was first advertised as having "Permanent views, assured surroundings" and "city homes with country advantages...within 15 minutes of Market Square."

In June 1914, The Bellevue Park Association was established, which was the oldest community organization in the Harrisburg area.

=== Breeze Hill Mansion ===
McFarland and his family purchased a 2.5-acre tract of land, upon which laid the Haehnlen's former summer house in disrepair. Nicknamed "Breeze Hill" by his wife, the estate would come be home to one of the most widely known gardens in America, where McFarland would experiment with cross-pollinating new varieties of roses and would publish the results in color for a popular horticulture publication.

== See also ==
- List of Harrisburg neighborhoods
