= Hardscrabble =

Hardscrabble or Hard Scrabble is land that is rocky or of poor quality, as in the term hardscrabble farm. It is often used as a euphemism for any sort of hard working or poverty, as in hardscrabble childhood. A number of towns use this name:

- Hardscrabble (Harrisburg), Pennsylvania, a former neighborhood in Midtown Harrisburg, Pennsylvania
- Hardscrabble, California, now Ione, California
- Hardscrabble, Colorado, an extinct town in Colorado
- Hardscrabble, Illinois, now Streator, Illinois
- Hardscrabble, Indiana, a town in Indiana
- Hardscrabble, New York, now Farmingdale, New York
- Hardscrabble, Ohio
- Hardscrabble, Ontario, a village incorporated into the town of Hamilton, Ontario, today's Cobourg, Ontario, Canada
- Hardscrabble, Texas, a defunct 1840s settlement in southern Dallas County, Texas
- Hardscrabble, Virginia, an unincorporated community in Highland County, Virginia
- Hardscrabble, West Virginia, now Scrabble, West Virginia
- Hardscrabble or Hard Scrabble, Wisconsin, now Hazel Green (town), Wisconsin
- Hard Scrabble and Snow Town, two African-American neighborhoods in 19th-century Providence, Rhode Island
- Hardscrabble Canyon, in the Wet Mountains, in Colorado
- Hardscrabble Pass, in Colorado
- Hardscrabble Peak, in Montana
- Hardscrabble River, the estuary of Wilson Stream, a small river in Washington County, Maine

== Historic sites ==
- Hardscrabble, a log cabin built by Ulysses S. Grant, now located at Grant's Farm, Grantwood Village, Missouri
- Hardscrabble (Bahama, North Carolina), a historic plantation house
- Hardscrabble Farm, an historic farm property and Greek Revival farmhouse in rural Searsmont, Maine
- Proposed name for Beckham County, Kentucky

== Other uses ==
- Hardscrabble, a 2012 electronic music album by The Flashbulb
- Hardscrabble Open (also known as the Hardscrabble Women's Invitation), a golf tournament played at the Hardscrabble Golf Club (also known as the Hardscrabble Country Club) in Fort Smith, Arkansas from 1945 to 1953; it was an official LPGA Tour event from 1948 to 1950
