= Rite-Hite =

American manufacturer

- Company type: Private
- Industry: Dock lifts and safety systems
- Founded: 1965
- Headquarters: Milwaukee, Wisconsin, USA
- Number of locations: 100
- Key people: Michael White, CEO
- Products: Materials handling equipment
- Number of employees: 2,200
- Website: https://www.ritehite.com

Rite-Hite is an American company that manufactures loading dock equipment, industrial doors, safety barriers, industrial fans and other in-plant products. Rite-Hite is headquartered in Milwaukee, Wisconsin.

== Overview ==
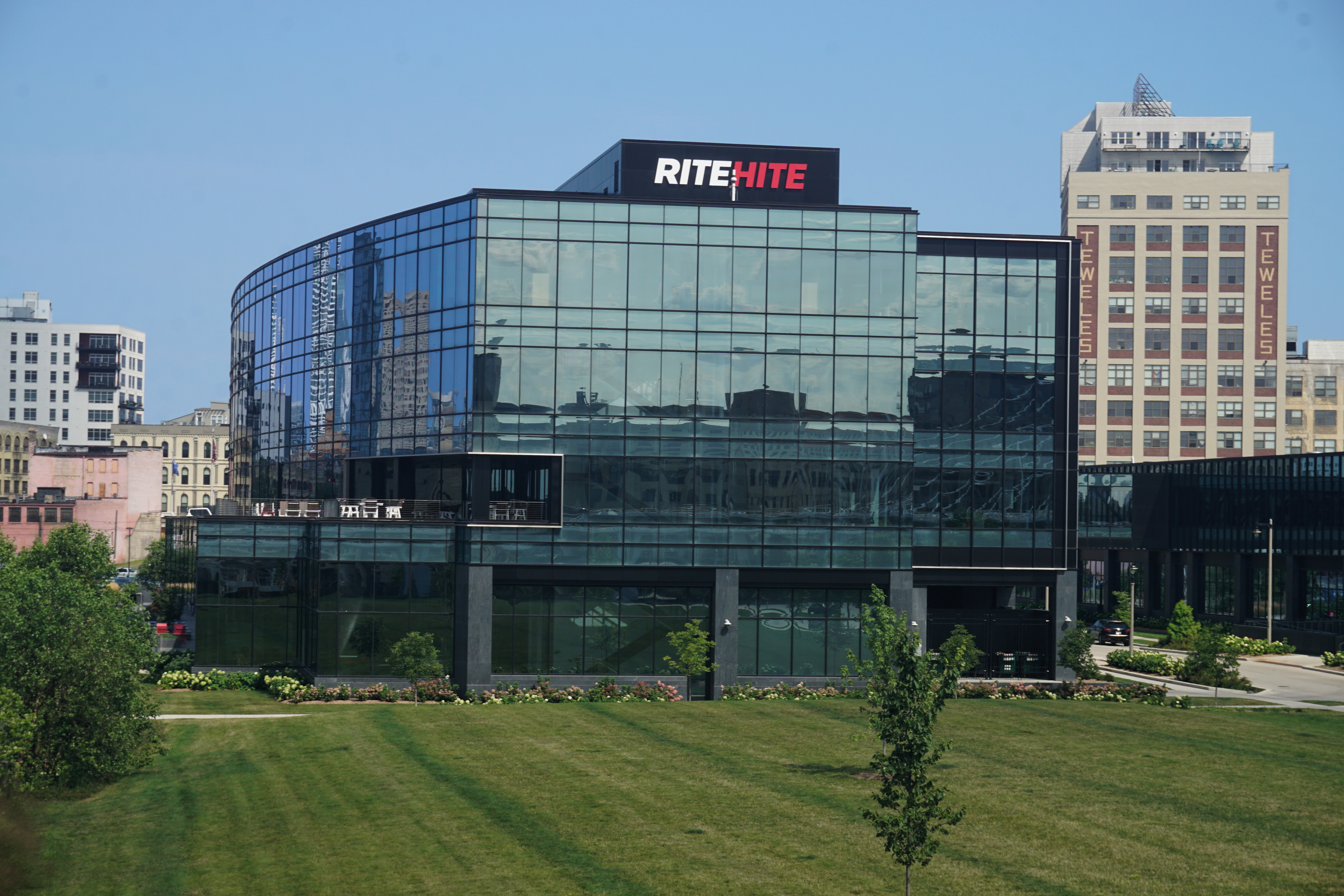
Rite-Hite Headquarters in Milwaukee

Rite-Hite was founded in 1965 by Arthur K. White, the father of Rite-Hite’s current owner and chairman, Mike White. The company has about 200 employees in the Milwaukee area and about 2,200 in its 100 locations worldwide. These include manufacturing facilities in Wisconsin, Iowa, Mississippi, Germany, Latvia, Poland, Denmark, Italy and China.

== Products ==
Rite-Hite’s known products are dock leveling systems, high-speed doors and high-volume low-speed fans. and vehicle restraints.

== Subsidiaries ==
Rite-Hite subsidiary companies include DuctSox Corporation, and Arbon Equipment Corporation. Most subsidiaries manufacture loading solutions, air dispersion systems, and modular walls and curtains for the environmental separation, machine guarding and area protection purposes.

== Recognition ==
Rite-Hite is a recipient of the 2002 and 2008 Wisconsin Governor's Export Achievement Awards. In 2010, it received an Industrial Maintenance and Plant Operations Magazine's IMPOvation award for the acoustic curtain walls produced by its subsidiary Zoneworks. It has also received several Plant Engineering magazine's awards, most recently in 2009 the gold award in the Construction, Buildings and Grounds category, and the grand award in 2010.
