= Harrisburg Midtown Arts Center =

Arts and cultural center in Pennsylvania, US

- H·MAC
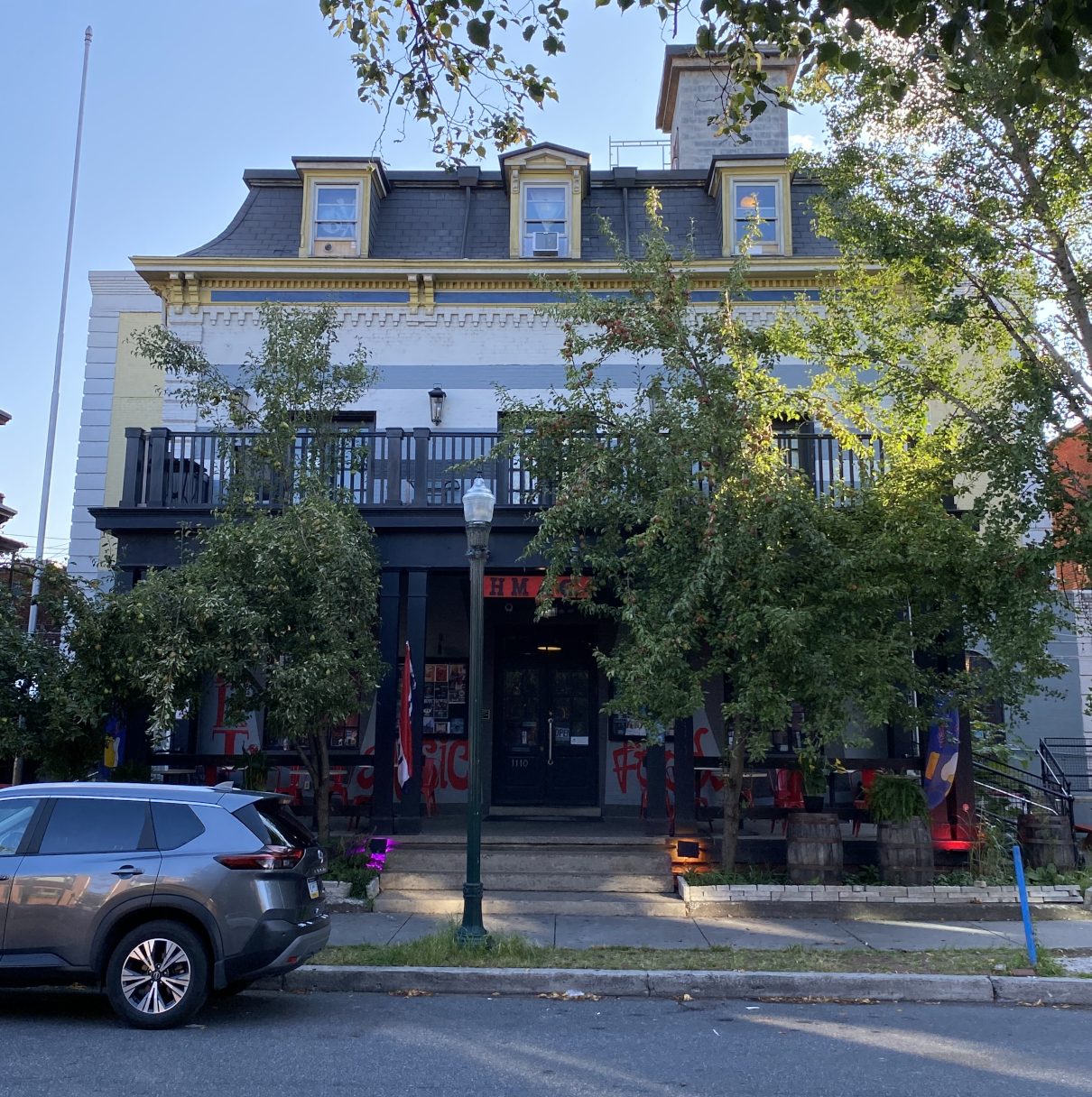
- The H·MAC building as seen from across North Third Street
- Interactive map of Harrisburg Midtown Arts Center
- Address: 1110 North Third Street; Harrisburg, Pennsylvania
- Coordinates: 40.2682°N 76.8880°W

Construction
- Built: c. 1865
- Renovated: 2009
- Expanded: 2015
- Closed: 2026

Website
- Official website

The Harrisburg Midtown Arts Center, alternatively the House of Music, Arts & Culture (styled "H·MAC"), was a multidisciplinary arts and cultural center located in Midtown Harrisburg, Pennsylvania. It is located in the historic Police Athletic League building, which originally served as a Jewish Community Center about one mile (1.6 km) from the Pennsylvania State Capitol complex.

== History ==
The building was originally a private residence built c. 1865 for Albert and Kate Hummel and their four daughters. In 1869 the house, which included fourteen rooms and two baths, was valued at $37,000. Harry E. Hershey purchased the house in 1893. The Hershey family lived there until 1925 when it was sold to the Fraternal Order of Orioles. The Orioles added a three-story addition to the back of the house which included an auditorium and a dining room. The building became the Jewish Community Center in 1931 and belonged to the Police Athletic League from 1960 to 1984.

Harrisburg Midtown Arts Center and its Stage On Herr opened in 2009. In June 2015 the entire building opened which now included The Capitol Room space and a Kitchen & Gallery Bar area. An unused swimming pool also remains in the basement of the building. In August 2018, the bar filed for bankruptcy, but exited the following May with a rebranding to House of Music, Arts & Culture. Despite this change, it is still commonly referred to as Harrisburg Midtown Arts Center.

In February 2026, it was reported that the H·MAC would be closing after not paying their entertainment taxes.

=== Stage On Herr ===
The Stage On Herr is a 34,000-square-foot (3,200 m^{2}) performing arts space located inside the former Hebrew gym. It is a venue for music, comedy and arts. Opened in 2009, it has a capacity of 350 people, hosts a variety of events and contains a full bar.

=== The Capitol Room ===
The Capitol Room is an art deco ballroom on the second floor with a stage and 1,200 person capacity. It contains a bar and a mezzanine overlooking Third Street.

== Controversy ==
H·MAC was the subject of controversy after a patron alleged she was drugged at the bar and subsequently sexually assaulted in July 2018, which unleashed a social media firestorm of further allegations directed toward H·MAC and founder John Traynor. Harrisburg Police denied many of the claims of the woman and on June 30 2021, a Dauphin County judge awarded Traynor $4.7 million in a defamation suit after the bar entered bankruptcy in 2018 following a loss of business. Traynor continues to work under the new HMAC Venue LLC. as a consultant.
