= Allison Hill, Harrisburg, Pennsylvania =

Coordinates: 40.26233°N 76.86429°W

Allison Hill
- Neighborhood of Harrisburg
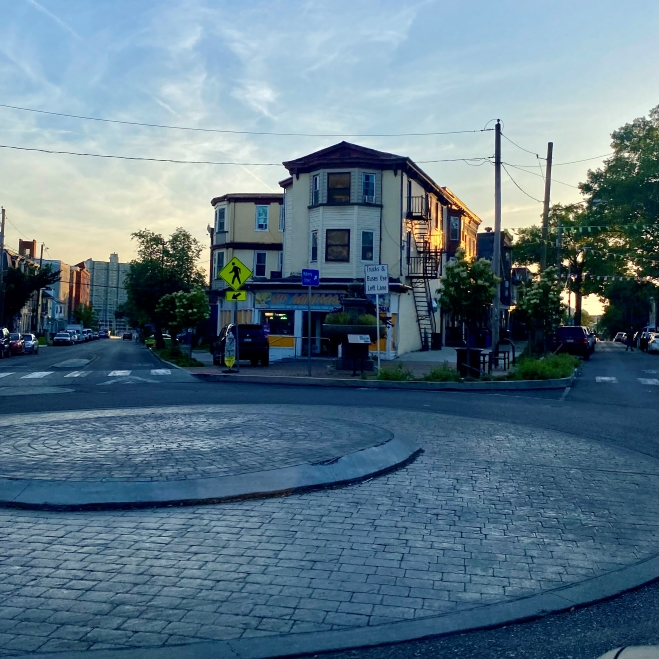
- "MulDer Square" in Allison Hill (Mulberry St & Derry St.)
- Interactive map of Allison Hill
- Location within Pennsylvania
- Country: United States
- State: Pennsylvania
- County: Dauphin County
- City: Harrisburg

Population (2020)
  - Total: 16,917
- ZIP Code: 17103, 17104
- Area codes: 717 and 223

Allison Hill (also known as The Hill) is a neighborhood in Harrisburg, Pennsylvania, in the United States. It is located directly east of downtown Harrisburg on a bluff overlooking the older original borough (now city) along the Susquehanna River. The Hill comprises some sub-neighborhoods, such as Hillside Village; others have nicknames such as "The Ville" and the "Third Ward". Primarily, it can be separated into three smaller neighborhoods: North Allison Hill (from Route 22 to State Street), Central Allison Hill (from State Street to Market Street), and South Allison Hill (from Market Street to the railroad tracks). It was named after William Allison, an early Harrisburg landowner who owned farms on the bluff outside of the then-Borough. First referred to as "Allison's Farm" or "Allison's Hill Farm", it finally became shortened to "Allison Hill" as the City expanded.

== Architecture and landscaping ==
Allison Hill encompasses the Mount Pleasant Historic District. The neighborhood consists of single family homes, apartments, small businesses, and townhomes. Most of the architecture is brick, in Italianate, Victorian, or Colonial Revival styles.

Many of the homes on The Hill offer views of the Capitol rotunda from their upper stories. The neighborhood is also home to many stone churches. Along Market Street gardens are tended by volunteers from St. Francis Church, the Silence of Mary Home and other organizations. In times past, so many people grew grapes that in the fall when the grapes were harvested, residents would shut down the streets and make wine. Many homes still have the same ancient grapevines in their backyards.

The neighborhood is also dotted with murals, some hidden and others placed in full view of the main roads. Sylvan Heights Mansion, which is now occupied by the YWCA, and serves as housing for homeless women and children who are victims of domestic violence, sits on the hill and overlooks downtown.

== Demographics ==
As of 2020, 16,917 people were living in Allison Hill. The many cultures represented in Allison Hill include West African, Vietnamese, Indonesian, diverse Latin American, African-American, and European-American populations. The Hill is home to many businesspeople, artists, and social justice and community activists.

== Culture ==
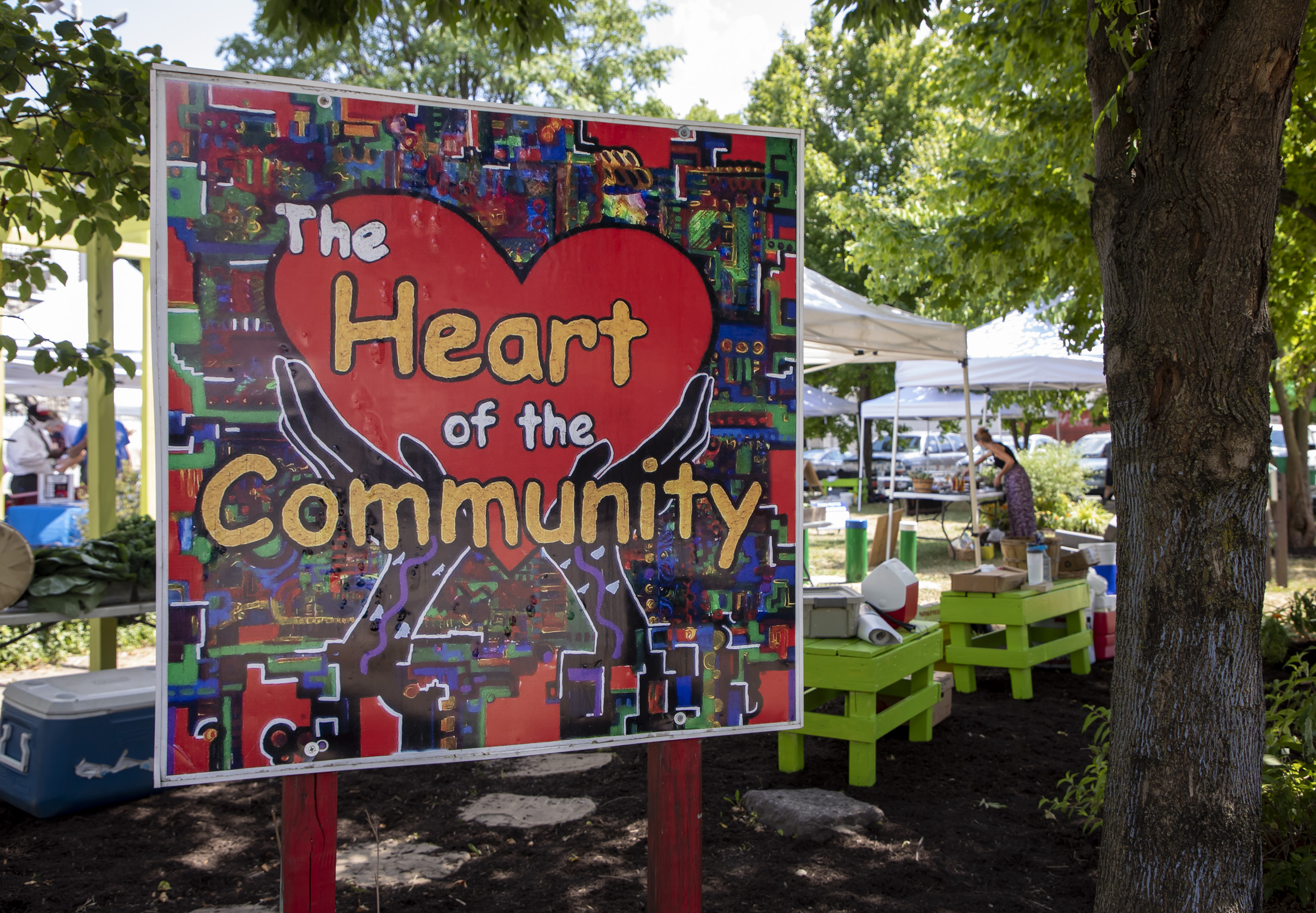
Allison Hill Farmers Market, July 2020

The Hill is home to Reservoir Park, where summer festivals draw hundreds each year to celebrate music and the arts. Audiences sit on the grassy hill overlooking the Levitt Pavilion, an open-air amphitheater, which hosts free events, including talent contests, "Jazz Under the Stars," movies, and "Shakespeare in the Park."

The park also has a large playground, as well as tennis and basketball courts, and the National Civil War Museum.

There are also a number of small stores and restaurants in the area, which sell or serve traditional Caribbean, Latino, African, and Asian foods. Community gardens and farmers markets also provide locally grown produce and food.

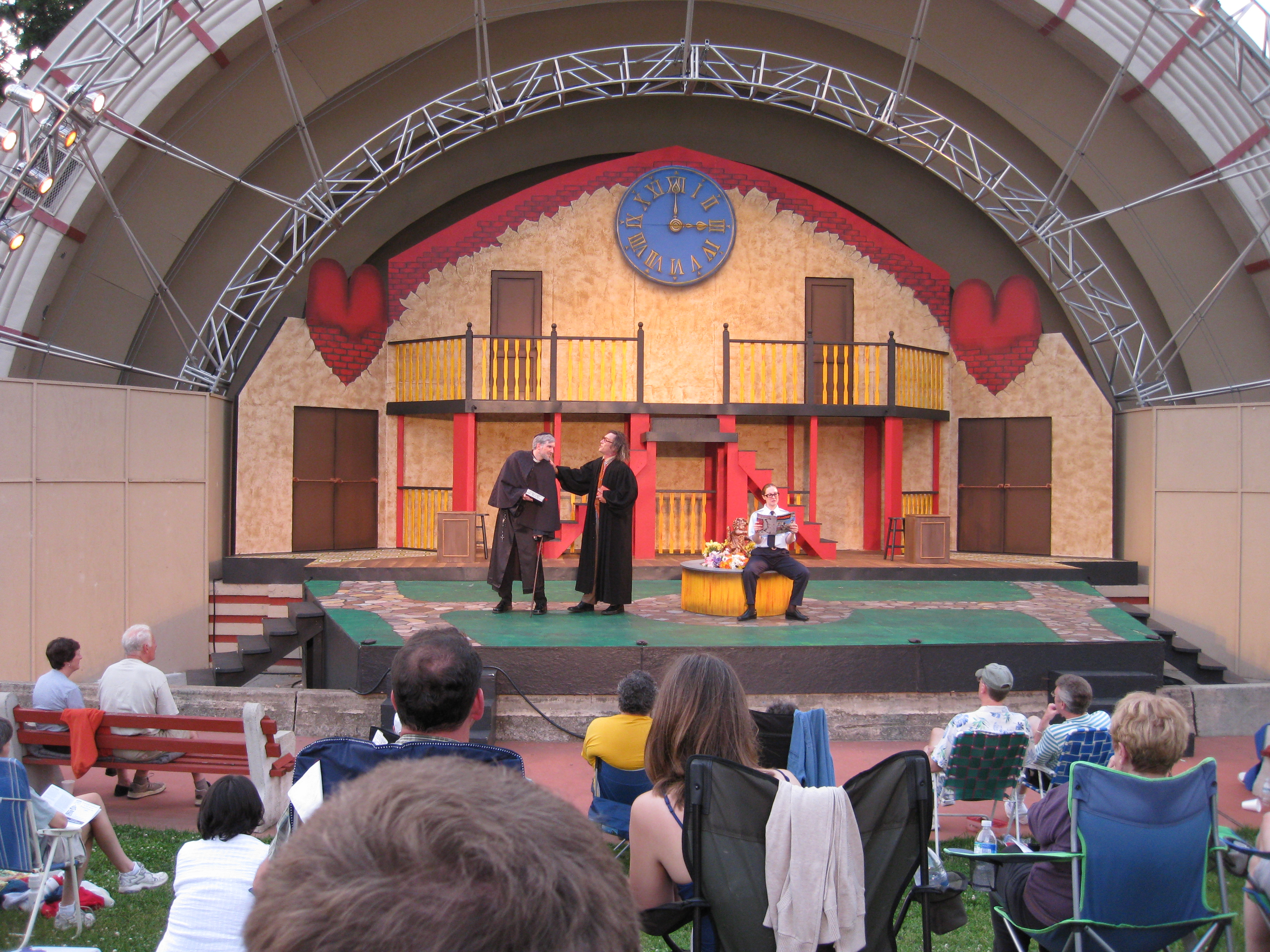
Shakespeare in the Park at Reservoir Park

== Economic decline and gentrification ==
Over the years, a number of homes and buildings have fallen into disrepair and been condemned. Habitat for Humanity of the Greater Harrisburg Area, The Tri-County Housing Development Corporation, Tri County Community Action and other organizations have been working to create opportunities for home ownership within the neighborhood, support existing homeowners with critical home repairs, and encourage greater community involvement by area residents in order to reduce blight and crime.

South Allison Hill, bordered by Cameron Street, Market Street, 18th Street, and Paxton Street is a designated Weed and Seed neighborhood. This neighborhood recently began both the South Allison Hill Homeowners/Residents Association and the South Allison Hill Business Association.
