= Capitol District (Harrisburg, Pennsylvania) =

Neighborhood of Harrisburg, Pennsylvania, United States

- Neighborhood of Harrisburg
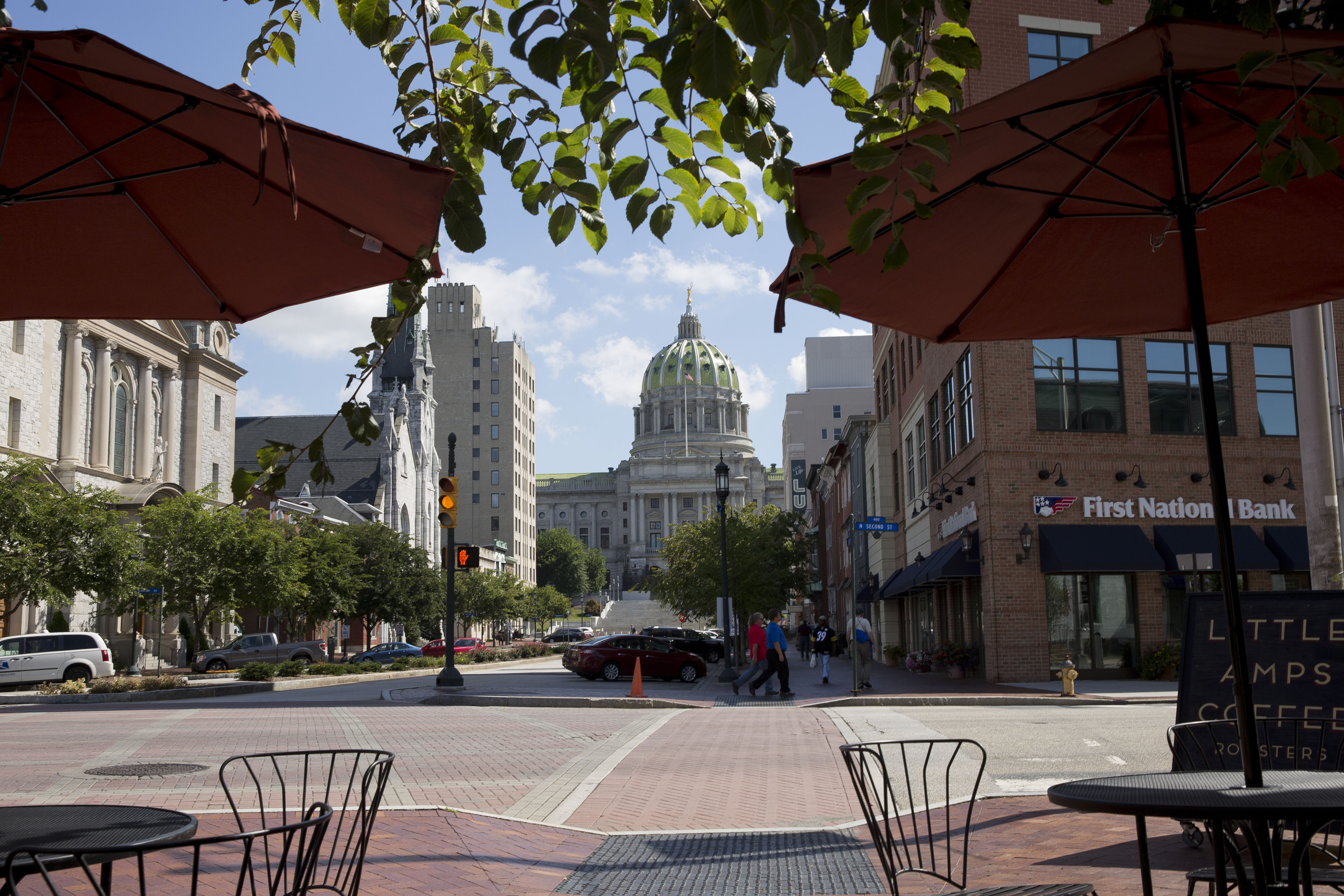
- Second and State Streets in front of the Capitol building
- Interactive map of Capitol District
- Coordinates: 40.267°N 76.881°W
- Country: United States
- State: Pennsylvania
- County: Dauphin County
- City: Harrisburg
- Area codes: 717 and 223

The Capitol District is a neighborhood adjacent to the state capitol in Harrisburg, Pennsylvania. It is delineated by Forster St. to the North, Walnut St. to the South, 3rd St. to the East, and the Susquehanna River to the west. This neighborhood borders the large Pennsylvania State Capitol Complex and has easy access to the Downtown Harrisburg. The Capital District is home to Saint Patrick's Cathedral, St. Stephen's Episcopal Cathedral, State Museum of Pennsylvania, the historic Harrisburg Area YMCA building, many beautiful houses, and several small bistros.

== See also ==
- List of Harrisburg neighborhoods
