= Historic Harrisburg Association =

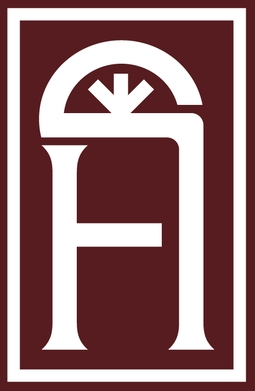
- Formation: 1973
- Type: Nonprofit
- Executive Director: David J. Morrison
- Main organ: Board of Directors
- Publication: Harrisburg Heritage
- Website: historicharrisburg.org

The Historic Harrisburg Association (HHA) is a 501(c)(3) non-profit organization which operates in Harrisburg, Pennsylvania. Established in 1973 following the devastation from flooding caused by Hurricane Agnes and the demolition of the State Theatre, it advocates for historic preservation and urban revitalization. HHA collaborates with civic organization, neighborhood groups, and government agencies.

It has EIN 23-7244724 as a 501(c)(3) Public Charity; in 2024 it reported $456,705 in total revenue and $1,262,518 in total assets.

== About ==
Each year, HHA presents a list of "Preservation Priorities" to highlight endangered historic structures and encourage their preservation. HHA also holds educational programs, historic tours, and fundraising events annually. Their annual "Elegant Progressions" is a progressive style dinner across historic buildings and the proceeds are split with The Kidney Foundation of Central PA.
