= Harrisburg Housing Authority =

Public Housing Authority overview
- Formed: 1938
- Headquarters: 351 Chestnut St. Harrisburg, Pennsylvania 17101
- Public Housing Authority executives: Ms. Emily J. Leader, Esq., Commissioner Chairman; Mr. Lavelle Muhammad, Commissioner; Rev. Donrico Colden, Commissioner; Ms. Mattie Watson, Commissioner
- Website: Harrisburg Housing Authority

The Harrisburg Housing Authority (HHA) maintains the Public Housing Program for the City of Harrisburg, Pennsylvania.

== History ==
HHA owns and manages 1,738 public housing units in eight separate communities: three high-rise towers for the elderly and five family communities.

Additionally, the Scattered Site program facilitates eighty more family housing residences throughout the city. The U.S. Department of Housing and Urban Development also funds HHA's Housing Choice Voucher (HCV) Program, which maintains 1,200 vouchers in the area to promote more options for living.

== List of communities ==
- William Howard Day Homes
- Hoverter Homes
- Hall Manor
- Hillside Village
- MW Smith Homes
- Jackson Tower (elderly only)
- Lick Tower (elderly only)
- Morrison Tower (elderly only)
