= List of Harrisburg neighborhoods =

The following is a list of neighborhoods, districts, and other sections located in the city of Harrisburg, Pennsylvania. The list is organized by broader geographical sections within the city. While there is no official list of neighborhoods, districts, and places, this list was compiled from the sources listed in the References and External links sections, as well as from published information from secondary sources.

Common usage for Harrisburg's neighborhood names does not respect "official" borders used by the city's police, planning commission or other entities. Therefore, some of the places listed here may overlap geographically, and residents do not always agree where one neighborhood ends and another begins. Some names are past neighborhoods or developments that no longer exist (such as "Hardscrabble").

Historically, neighborhood development has followed ward boundaries, but many neighborhoods and historic districts have been re-shaped by community leaders, the Harrisburg Architectural Review Board, and planning organizations in the post-industrial era.

Historian Jeb Stuart wrote of the overlapping patchwork of neighborhoods, while "potentially confusing, only speaks positively to the ongoing quest of the citizenry in naming and building community cohesiveness in the areas in which they live." Neighborhoods distinguish themselves through architecture, construction, time period, setting, topography and reasons for development.

== Allison Hill ==
The Allison Hill district boundary includes Arsenal Boulevard and Herr Street to the north, 19th Street to the east, I-83 to the south, and the bluff along Cameron Street to the west.

- Central Allison Hill
- North Allison Hill
- Sibletown (antiquated, now William Howard Day and M.W. Smith Homes)
- South Allison Hill
- Springdale (antiquated)
- Summit Terrace

== City Island ==
City Island is a mile-long island owned by the city in the Susquehanna River. There are no residences; the area is used for recreation and extra city vehicle equipment storage.

== Downtown ==
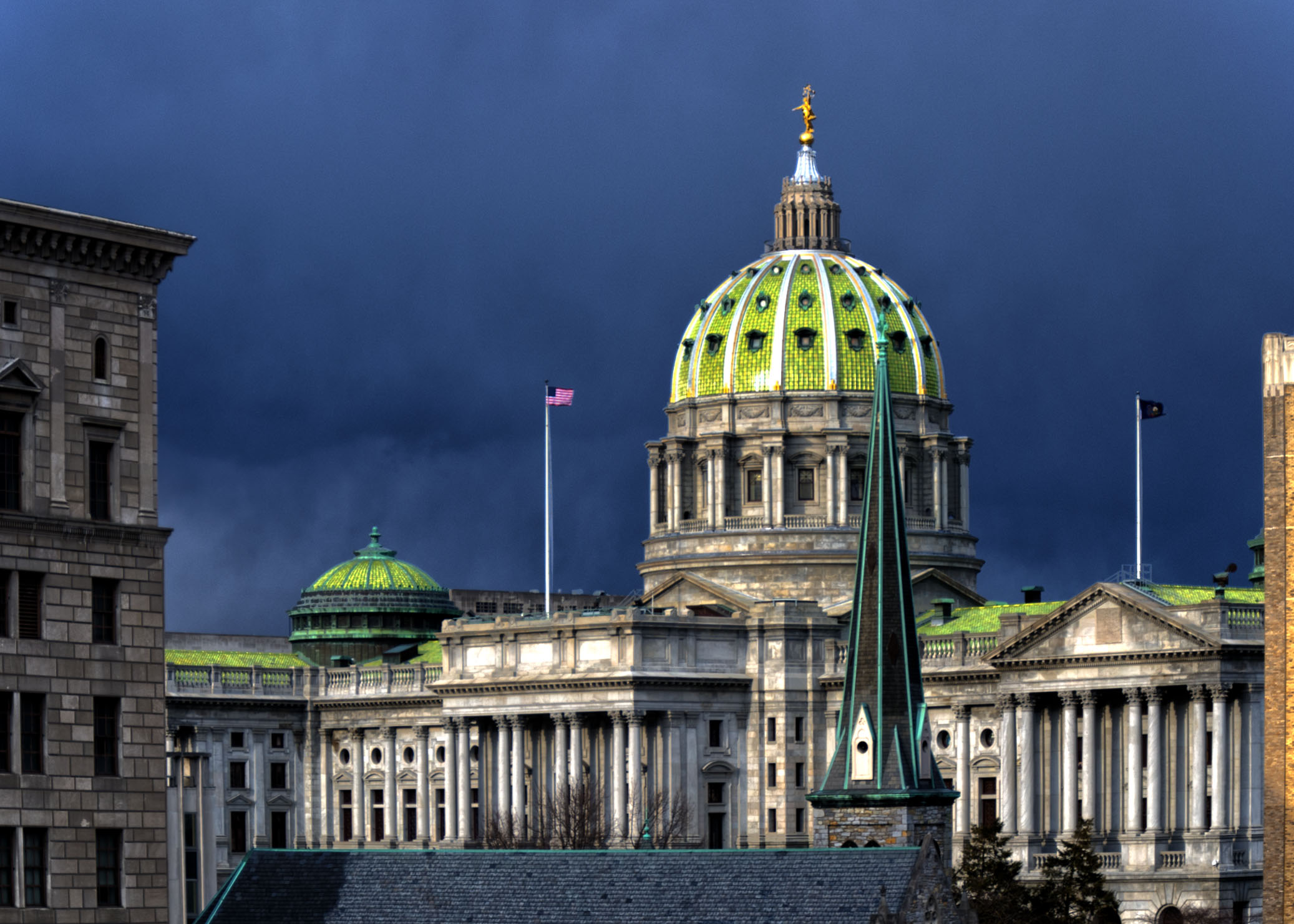
Pennsylvania State Capitol Complex, Bounded by 3rd and 7th, North and Walnut Streets Harrisburg

The boundary of Harrisburg's Downtown is considered Forster Street to the north, I-83 to the south, the railroad tracks to the east, and the Susquehanna River to the west.

- Bull Run (antiquated)
- Capitol District
- Eighth Ward (antiquated)
- Judytown (antiquated)
- Market Square
- Maclaysburg (antiquated)
- Restaurant Row
- Shipoke
- South of Market (SoMa)

== East Harrisburg ==
The East Harrisburg district boundary includes Reservoir Park and Market Street to the north, the city line to the east, the railroad tracks to the south, and 18th Street to the west. Smaller rowhouse neighborhoods and detached homes in Bellevue Park make up this area, in addition to commercial corridors along South 29th and Derry Streets, an industrial corridor adjacent to the railroad tracks, and larger institutional uses such as John Harris High School, the Marshall Math Science Academy, and the former Bishop McDevitt High School.

- Bellevue Park

== Midtown ==
The Midtown district boundary includes Maclay Street to the north, 7th Street to the east, Forster Street to the south, and Front Street to the west.

- Capitol Heights
- Cumberland Court
- Engleton
- Fox Ridge
- Hardscrabble (antiquated, demolished)
- Verbeketown (antiquated)

== South Harrisburg ==
The South Harrisburg district boundary includes I-83 to the north, the city line to the south and east, and the Susquehanna River to the west.

- Cloverly Heights
- Frog Hollow (antiquated, demolished)
- Hall Manor
- Hoverter Homes
- Lochiel (antiquated)
- Sheesleytown (antiquated, demolished)

== Uptown ==
The boundary of the Uptown district is the city limits to the north, 7th Street to the east, Maclay Street to the south, and Front Street to the west.

- Academy Manor
- Camp Curtin
- Cottage Ridge (antiquated)
- Curtin Heights (antiquated)
- Landmark
- Riverside
- Schuddemageville (antiquated)

== Historic Districts ==
- 6th Street Historic District
- Allison Hill Historic District
- Bellevue Park Historic District
- Old Downtown Commercial Historic District
- Fox Ridge Historic District
- Historic Harrisburg Historic District
- Old Midtown Historic District
- Mount Pleasant Historic District
- Pennsylvania Capitol Historic District
- Olde Uptown Historic District

== See also ==
- Capital Area Greenbelt
- Harrisburg Housing Authority
- Pennsylvania State Capitol Complex
