= Harrisburg Historic District =

Historic district in Pennsylvania, United States

- U.S. National Register of Historic Places
- U.S. Historic district
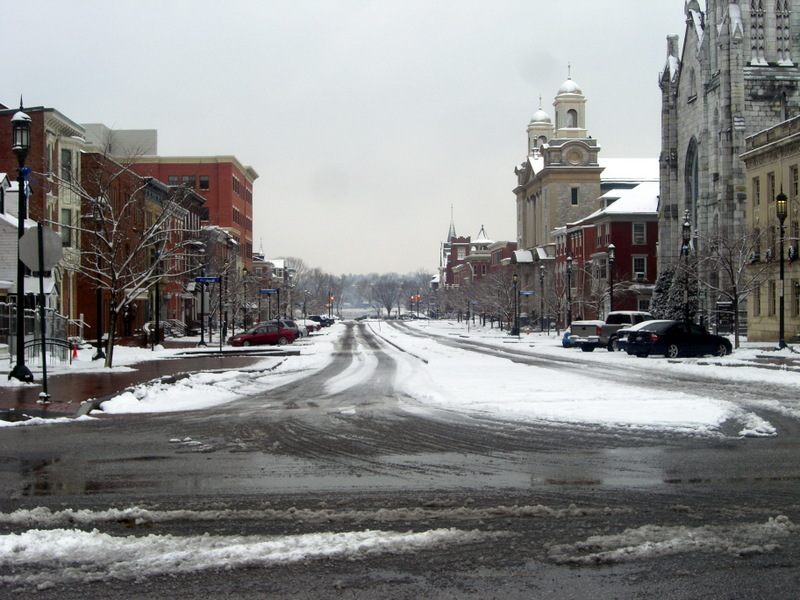
- State Street in 2012

- Location within Pennsylvania Location within the United States
- Location: Bounded roughly by Forster, 3rd, Hanna Sts. and the Susquehanna River, Harrisburg, Pennsylvania
- Coordinates: 40°15′33″N 76°52′55″W
- Area: 192 acres (78 ha)
- Architect: Multiple
- Architectural style: Mixed (more Than 2 Styles From Different Periods)
- NRHP reference No.: 76001632
- Added to NRHP: January 19, 1976

The Harrisburg Historic District is a national historic district which is located in Harrisburg, Dauphin County, Pennsylvania.

It was added to the National Register of Historic Places in 1976.

== History and architectural features ==
The district includes one contributing site and three hundred and forty contributing buildings which are located in a nineteenth-century residential area of Harrisburg that contains the original core of the city. Located in the district is Harris Park, which unifies the district.

Notable buildings include the Y.M.C.A., which was built in 1932, the William Maclay Mansion, which was erected in 1792, Grace Methodist Church, which was built in 1871, St. Stephen's Episcopal Cathedral, which was erected in 1826, St. Michael's Lutheran Church, which was built in 1906, the Cathedral of Saint Patrick, which was erected in 1907, and the Unit Row Houses. The John Harris Mansion is also located in the district, but was listed separately on the register.
