= List of Pennsylvania fire departments =

This is a list of fire departments in Pennsylvania organized by county. This is not a comprehensive list and not all counties are represented in this list.

== Allegheny County ==
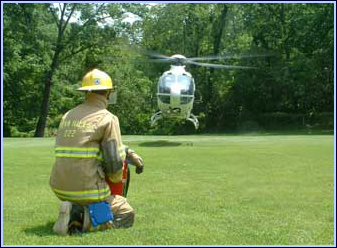
Penn Hills Fire Department firefighters landing a medical helicopter

- Aleppo Township Volunteer Fire Company (Aleppo, Sewickley Heights), Station 101
- Allegheny County Airport Authority Fire & Rescue, Station 100
- Allegheny County HazMat
  - Gold Team, Team 410
  - Blue Team, Company 420
  - Silver Team, Company 430
  - Red Team, Company 440
  - Green Team, Company 450
- Hazardous Materials Medical Respons (HMMR) Team, Station 480
- Allegheny Valley VFC (Harmar, Springdale Township), Station 315
- Avalon Volunteer Fire Company, Station 103
- Baldwin Fire and EMS
  - Baldwin E.M.S
  - Baldwin Fire-Rescue, Station 106-1 (Formerly Baldwin Independent Fire Company, Station 105)
  - Baldwin Fire-Rescue (HQ), Station 106-2 (Formerly Option VFD, Station 107)
  - Baldwin Fire-Rescue, Station 106-3 (Formerly South Baldwin VFC, Station 104)
- ~~Bellevue Borough Fire Department, Station 108~~ (Defunct/Decertified)
- Bell Acres VFD, Station 307
- Ben Avon VFD, Station 109
- Bethel Park VFC, Station 110
- Blawnox VFC, Station 111
- Brackenridge VFD - Station 112
- Bradford Woods VFD - Station 115
- Brentwood VFD - Station 116
- Bridgeville Fire Department, Station 117
- Carnegie Volunteer Fire & Rescue, Station 118
- Castle Shannon Volunteer Fire Department, Station 119
- Chalfant VFD, Station 120
- Cheswick VFD, Station 121
- Churchill VFD, Station 122
- Clairton VFD, Station 123
- Cochran Hose Co VFD (Edgeworth, Glen Osborne, Sewickley), Station 258
- Collier VFD
  - Kirwan Heights VFD, Station 124
  - Presto VFD, Station 125
  - Rennerdale VFD, Station 126
- Coraopolis VFD, Station 127
- Coulters Vol Fire & Rescue (South Versailles), Station 272
- Crafton VFD (Crafton, Thornburg, Rosslyn Farms), Station 128
- Crescent Township VFD, Station 129
- Dormont Fire Department, Station 130
- Dravosburg #1, Station 131
- Duquesne VFD, Station 133
- East Deer Volunteer Hose Company, Station 134
- Edgewood VFD, Station 137
- Elizabeth Boro VFC, Station 139
- Elizabeth Township
  - Elizabeth Township VFD, Greenock, Station 140-4 (Formerly Greenock VFC Co 4, Station 144)
  - Elizabeth Township VFD, Blythedale, Station 140-3 (Formerly Blythedale VFC, Station 143)
  - Elizabeth Township VFD, Central, Station 140-7 (Formerly Central VFC Co 7, Station 147)
  - Blaine Vill VFC, Station 142
  - Buena Vista VFC, Station 145
- Emsworth VFC, Station 148
- Etna VFD, Station 149
- Fawn VFD
  - Fawn #1, Station 150
  - Fawn #2, Station 151
- Imperial VFD (Findlay), Station 152
- Forest Hills VFD, Station 153
- Forward Township
  - Gallatin-Sunnyside VFD, Station 154
  - Forward Township VFD, Station 155
- Fox Chapel VFD, Station 157
- Franklin Park VFD, Station 158
- Frazer Township
  - Frazer #1 VFD, Station 159
  - Frazer #2 VFD, Station 160
- Glassport Fire Department, Station 161
- Greentree VFD, Station 163
- Hampton VFD
  - Hampton Township VFD #1, Station 164
  - North Hampton VFD, Station 165
- Harrison Township
  - Citizen Hose #2 VFD, Station 167
  - Hilltop VFD, Station 168
  - Harrison Hills VFD, Station 169
- Heidelberg VFD, Station 170
- Homestead VFC, Station 171
- Indiana Township
  - Dorseyville VFD, Station 172
  - Middle Road VFD, Station 174
  - Rural Ridge VFD, Station 175
- Jefferson Hills
  - Jefferson Hills Fire & Rescue, Station 177
  - Floreffe VFC, Station 178 (Merged into Station 177)
  - ~~Gill Hall VFC, Station 179~~ (Defunct/Decertified)
  - Jefferson 885 VFC, Station 180
- Kennedy Township VFD, Station 181
- Fair Oaks VFD (Fair Oaks, Leet Township), Station 308
- Leetsdale VFD, Station 309
- Liberty Boro VFD, Station 183
- Lincoln Boro VFRC, Station 184
- Marshall Township VFD, Station 185
- McCandless
  - Highland VFD, Station 186
  - Ingomar VFD, Station 187
  - Peebles VFD, Station 188
- McDonald VFD, Station 310
- McKees Rocks VFD, Station 189
- McKeesport Bureau of Fire, Station 190
- Millvale VFD, Station 191
- Monroeville
  - Monroeville #1 VFD, Station 192
  - Monroeville #3 VFD, Station 193
  - Monroeville #4 VFD, Station 194
  - Monroeville #5 VFD, Station 195
  - Monroeville #6 VFD, Station 196
- Moon Township VFD, Station 197
- Mt. Lebanon Fire Department, Station 198
- Mt. Oliver VFD, Station 199
- Munhall
  - Munhall #1 VFD, Station 200
  - Munhall #2 VFD, Station 201
  - Munhall #4 VFD, Station 203
  - Munhall #5 VFD, Station 204
- Neville Island VFD, Station 205
- North Braddock VFD, Station 207
- North Fayette Township VFD Station 209
- North Versailles
  - Crestas Terrace VFD, Station 212
  - Fire Department of North Versailles, Station 213
  - West Wilmerding VFD, Station 211
- Oakdale VFD, Station 215
- Oakmont VFD, Station 216
- O'Hara
  - Pleasant Valley VFD, Station 217
  - Parkview VFD, Station 218
- Ohio Township VFD, Station 220
- Penn Hills Fire Department
  - Lincoln Park VFD, Station 221
  - Rosedale VFD, Station 222
  - North Bessemer VFD, Station 223
  - Point Breeze VFD, Station 224
  - Thad Stevens VFD, Station 225
  - Penn VFD, Station 227
- Pitcairn #1 VFD, Station 229
- Pittsburgh Bureau of Fire
- Pleasant Hills VFC, Station 232
- Plum Borough
  - Unity VFD, Station 233
  - Renton VFD, Station 234
  - Logans Ferry VFD, Station 235
  - Holiday Park VFD, Station 236
- Reserve Township VFD, Station 317
- Richland Township
  - Richland VFD, Station 241
  - Valencia VFD, Station 242
- River's Edge VFD (Braddock, East Pittsburgh, Rankin), Station 113
- Robinson Township
  - Forest Grove VFD, Station 243
  - Groveton VFD, Station 244
  - Moon Run VFD, Station 245
- Ross Township
  - Evergreen VFD, Station 246
  - Berkeley Hills VFD, Station 247
  - Perrysville VFD, Station 248
  - Quaill VFD, Station 249
  - Fairview VFD, Station 250
  - Seville VFD, Station 251
  - Keating VFD, Station 252
  - Laural Gardens VFD, Station 253
  - Ross Township Fire Police, Station 254
- Scott Township
  - Bower Hill VFD, Station 255
  - East Carnegie VFD, Station 256
  - Glendale Hose Co. #1, Station 257
- Shaler Township
  - Bauerstown VFD, Station 259
  - Cherry City VFD, Station 260
  - Elfinwild VFD, Station 261
  - Shaler Villa VFD, Station 262
  - Sharps Hills VFD, Station 263
  - Undercliff VFD, Station 264
- Southern Allegheny Valley Emergency Services, Station 102(Sharpsburgh, Aspenwall)
- South Fayette Township
  - South Fayette VFD Co. 1, Station 266
  - Sturgeon VFD, Station 267
  - Fairview VFD, Station 268
  - Oak Ridge VFD, Station 269
- South Park Township
  - Broughton VFD, Station 270
  - Library VFD, Station 271
- Springdale Boro VFD, Station 273
- Stowe Township VFD, Station 275
- Swissvale Boro
  - Swissvale #1, Station 278-1
  - Swissvale #2, Station 278-2
- Tarentum Borough
  - Highland Hose Co., Station 280
  - Eureka Fire Rescue, Station 281
  - Summit Hose Co, Station 282
- Trafford VFD, #1, Station 311
- Turtle Creek VFD, Station 283
- Upper St. Clair VFD, Station 284
- United Vol. Fire & Rescue (Wall, E. McKeesport), Station 287
- Vigilant Hose #1 VFD (Port Vue), Station 237
- Verona VFD, Station 285
- Versailles VFD, Station 286
- West Deer Township
  - West Deer #1 VFC, Station 288
  - West Deer #2 VFC, Station 289
  - West Deer #3 VFC, Station 290
- West Elizabeth VFD, Station 291
- West Homestead VFD, Station 292
- West Mifflin
  - Homeville #1 VFD, Station 293
  - Duquesne Annex #2 VFD, Station 294
  - West Mifflin #3 VFD, Station 295
  - Skyview #4 VFC, Station 296
- West View VFD, Station 297
- Wexford VFC, Station 228 (Pine, Wexford)
- Whitaker VFD, Station 298
- White Oak
  - White Oak #1, Station 299
  - Rainbow VFD, Station 300
- Whitehall VFD, Station 301
- Wilkins Township
  - Wilkins #1 VFC, Station 302
  - Wilkins #3 VFC, Station 303
  - Wilkins #4 VFC, Station 304
- Wilmerding VFD, Station 306

== Armstrong County ==
- Apollo
  - Apollo #2 VFD, Station 20
  - Apollo #3 VFD, Station 40
- Bethel Township VFD, Station 270
- Burrell Township VFD, Station 290
- Dayton District VFD, Station 30
- Distant VFD, Station 300
- Elderton District VFD, Station 50
- Ford Cliff VFC, Station 80
- Ford City Hose Company #1, Station 90
- Freeport VFD, Station 70
- Gilpin Township VFD, Station 100
- Kiski Township VFD, Station 140
- Kittanning
  - Kittanning Hose, Hook & Ladder Company #1, Station 110
  - Kittanning Hose Company #4, Station 120
  - Kittanning Hose Company #6, Station 130
- Kittanning Township VFD, Station 310
- Leechburg VFD, Station 150
- Manor Township VFD, Station 160
- North Apollo VFD, Station 170
- Parker City VFD, Station 180
- Parks Township VFD, Station 200
- Pine Township VFC, Station 190
- Rayburn Township VFC, Station 260
- Rural Valley Hose Company #1, Station 210
- South Buffalo Township VFC, Station 220
- Sugarcreek VFD, Station 230
- Washington Township VFD, Station 280
- West Kittanning VFD, Station 240
- West Hills Emergency Services, Station 60
- Worthington VFD, Station 250

== Beaver County ==
- Aliquippa Fire Department, HQ/Station 1
- Ambridge Fire Department, Station 71
- Baden Fire Department, Station 47
- Beaver VFD, Station 101
- Beaver Falls VFD, Station 11
- Big Beaver VFD, Station 14
- Bridgewater, Station 28
- Brighton Township VFD, Station 63
- Center Township
  - Center Township #1, Station 36
  - Center Township #2, Station 37
  - Center Township #3, Station 38
- Chippewa Township VFD, Station 22
- Crescent Township VFD, Station 129
- Conway VFD, Station 49
- Darlington Township VFD, Station 18
- Daugherty, Station 86
- Economy VFD, Station 69
- Ellwood City VFD, Station 103
- Enon Valley VFD, Station 12
- Fallston VFD, Station 50
- Franklin Township VFD, Station 70
- Freedom VFD, Station 27
- Hanover VFD, Station 68
- Harmony Township VFD, Station 48
- Homewood VFD, Station 19
- Hookstown VFD, Station 60
- Hopewell Township VFD, Station 92
- Independence VFD, Station 80
- Industry VFD, Station 97
- Leetsdale VFD, Station 30
- Koppel VFD, Station 17
- Midland VFD, Station 95
- Monaca
  - Monaca VFD #1, Station 56
  - Monaca VFD #4, Station 57
  - Monaca VFD #5, Station 58
- New Brighton, Station 84
- New Galilee VFD, Station 15
- New Sewickley Fire District, Station 52
- North Sewickley, Station 13
- Ohioville VFD, Station 39
- Patterson Heights VFD, Station 33
- Patterson Township VFC, Station 90
- Potter Township VFD, Station 34
- Pulaski Township VFD, Station 89
- Raccoon Township VFD, Station 35
- Rochester VFD, Station 23
- Shippingport VFD, Station 96
- South Beaver VFD, Station 61
- South Heights VFD, Station 45
- Vanport VFD, Station 24
- West Mayfield VFD, Station 99
- White Township, Station 44

== Bedford County ==
- Bedford Fire Department (Co. 31)

== Berks County ==
Amity Fire Co.	Station #49	Mailing Address:
Amity Fire Co.		PO Box 383
Amity Fire Co.	Station Location:	Douglassville, PA 19518
Amity Fire Co.	47 Pine Forge Rd.	
Amity Fire Co.		Phone: 610.689.5218
Berks County Search and Rescue	Station #2	Mailing Address:
Berks County Search and Rescue		PO Box 113
Berks County Search and Rescue	Station Location:	Mohnton, PA 19540
Berks County Search and Rescue	Mohnton, PA 19540	
Berks Emergency Strike Team	Station #81	Mailing Address:
Berks Emergency Strike Team		37 Wanner Rd.
Berks Emergency Strike Team	Station Location:	Reading, PA 19606
Berks Emergency Strike Team	37 Wanner Rd	
Berks Emergency Strike Team		Phone: 610.921.0948
Bernville Fire Co.	Station #29	Mailing Address:
Bernville Fire Co.		PO Box 429
Bernville Fire Co.	Station Location:	Bernville, PA 19506
Bernville Fire Co.	6701 Bernville Rd.	
Bernville Fire Co.		Phone: 610.488.6592
Bethel Fire Co.	Station #54	Mailing Address:
Bethel Fire Co.		PO Box 145
Bethel Fire Co.	Station Location:	Bethel, PA 19507
Bethel Fire Co.	9675 Old Route 22	
Bethel Fire Co.		Phone: 717.933.5236
Birdsboro-Union Fire Dept.	Station #7-1	Mailing Address:
Birdsboro-Union Fire Dept.		214 W. 1st St.
Birdsboro-Union Fire Dept.	Station Location:	Birdsboro, PA 19508
Birdsboro-Union Fire Dept.	214 W. 1st St.	
Birdsboro-Union Fire Dept.		Phone: 610.582.0058
Birdsboro-Union Fire Dept.	Station #7-2	Mailing Address:
Birdsboro-Union Fire Dept.		1082 Chestnut St.
Birdsboro-Union Fire Dept.	Station Location:	Douglassville, PA 19518
Birdsboro-Union Fire Dept.	1082 Chestnut St.	
Birdsboro-Union Fire Dept.		Phone: 610.582.4730
Blandon Fire Co.	Station #12	Mailing Address:
Blandon Fire Co.		30 W. Wesner Rd.
Blandon Fire Co.	Station Location:	Blandon, PA 19510
Blandon Fire Co.	30 W. Wesner Rd.	
Blandon Fire Co.		Phone: 610.926.2811
Boyertown Area Fire & Rescue	Station #95-1	Mailing Address:
Boyertown Area Fire & Rescue		962 N. Reading Ave.
Boyertown Area Fire & Rescue	Station Location:	Boyertown, PA 19512
Boyertown Area Fire & Rescue	962 N. Reading Ave.	
Boyertown Area Fire & Rescue		Phone: 610.369.3777
Boyertown Area Fire & Rescue	Station #95-2	Mailing Address:
Boyertown Area Fire & Rescue		962 N. Reading Ave.
Boyertown Area Fire & Rescue	Station Location:	Boyertown, PA 19512
Boyertown Area Fire & Rescue	10 Warwick St.	
Boyertown Area Fire & Rescue	Station #95-3	Mailing Address:
Boyertown Area Fire & Rescue		962 N. Reading Ave.
Boyertown Area Fire & Rescue	Station Location:	Boyertown, PA 19512
Boyertown Area Fire & Rescue	240 N. Walnut St.	
Boyertown Area Fire & Rescue		Phone: 610.689.6002
Brecknock Fire Co.	Station #72	Mailing Address:
Brecknock Fire Co.		1153 Kurtz Mill Rd.
Brecknock Fire Co.	Station Location:	Mohnton, PA 19540
Brecknock Fire Co.	1153 Kurtz Mill Rd.	
Brecknock Fire Co.		Phone: 610.777.9575
Central Berks Fire Co.	Station #38	Mailing Address:
Central Berks Fire Co.		PO Box 306
Central Berks Fire Co.	Station Location:	Centerport, PA 19516
Central Berks Fire Co.	111 Callowhill St.	
Central Berks Fire Co.		Phone: 610.926.1910
Central Fire Co. Laureldale	Station #13	Mailing Address:
Central Fire Co. Laureldale		1409 Park Place
Central Fire Co. Laureldale	Station Location:	Laureldale, PA 19605
Central Fire Co. Laureldale	1409 Park Place	
Central Fire Co. Laureldale		Phone: 610.929.5505
Cumru Township Fire Department	Station #42-1	Mailing Address:
Cumru Township Fire Department		1775 Welsh Rd.
Cumru Township Fire Department	Station Location:	Mohnton, PA 19540
Cumru Township Fire Department	475 Mohns Hill Rd.	
Cumru Township Fire Department		Phone: 610.777.1343
Cumru Township Fire Department	Station #42-2	Mailing Address:
Cumru Township Fire Department		1775 Welsh Rd.
Cumru Township Fire Department	Station Location:	Mohnton, PA 19540
Cumru Township Fire Department	453 Church Rd.	
Cumru Township Fire Department		Phone: 610.777.1343
Cumru Township Fire Department	Station #42-3	Mailing Address:
Cumru Township Fire Department		1775 Welsh Rd.
Cumru Township Fire Department	Station Location:	Mohnton, PA 19540
Cumru Township Fire Department	743 Mt. View Rd.	
Cumru Township Fire Department		Phone: 610.777.1343
Earl Twp. Fire Co.	Station #19	Mailing Address:
Earl Twp. Fire Co.		1340 Ironstone Rd.
Earl Twp. Fire Co.	Station Location:	Boyertown, PA 19512
Earl Twp. Fire Co.	1340 Ironstone Rd.	
Earl Twp. Fire Co.		Phone: 610.369.1800
Eastern Berks Fire Dept.	Station #97-1	Mailing Address:
Eastern Berks Fire Dept.		PO Box 43
Eastern Berks Fire Dept.	Station Location:	Barto, PA 19504
Eastern Berks Fire Dept.	2243 Old Route 100	
Eastern Berks Fire Dept.		Phone: 610.845.2877
Eastern Berks Fire Dept.	Station #97-2	Mailing Address:
Eastern Berks Fire Dept.		PO Box 43
Eastern Berks Fire Dept.	Station Location:	Barto, PA 19504
Eastern Berks Fire Dept.	537 Chestnut St.	
Eastern Berks Fire Dept.		Phone: 610.845.2501
Eastern Berks Fire Dept.	Station #97-3	Mailing Address:
Eastern Berks Fire Dept.		PO Box 43
Eastern Berks Fire Dept.	Station Location:	Barto, PA 19504
Eastern Berks Fire Dept.	1817 N. Main St.	
Eastern Berks Fire Dept.		Phone: 610.367.2000
Exeter Twp. Fire Dept.	Station #25-2	Mailing Address:
Exeter Twp. Fire Dept.		46 W. 33rd St.
Exeter Twp. Fire Dept.	Station Location:	Reading, PA 19606
Exeter Twp. Fire Dept.	46 W. 33rd St.	
Exeter Twp. Fire Dept.		Phone: 610.779.8848
Exeter Twp. Fire Dept.	Station #25-3	Mailing Address:
Exeter Twp. Fire Dept.		5580 Boyertown Pk.
Exeter Twp. Fire Dept.	Station Location:	Birdsboro, PA 19508
Exeter Twp. Fire Dept.	5580 Boyertown Pk.	
Exeter Twp. Fire Dept.		Phone: 610.689.4196
Fleetwood Fire Co.	Station #45	Mailing Address:
Fleetwood Fire Co.		PO Box 101
Fleetwood Fire Co.	Station Location:	Fleetwood, PA 19522
Fleetwood Fire Co.	16 N. Chestnut St.	
Fleetwood Fire Co.		Phone: 610.944.7676
Frystown Fire Co.	Station #53	Mailing Address:
Frystown Fire Co.		485 Frystown Rd.
Frystown Fire Co.	Station Location:	Myerstown, PA 17067
Frystown Fire Co.	485 Frystown Rd.	
Frystown Fire Co.		Phone: 717.933.4213
Geigertown Fire Co.	Station #24	Mailing Address:
Geigertown Fire Co.		PO Box 209
Geigertown Fire Co.	Station Location:	Geigertown, PA 19523
Geigertown Fire Co.	3343 Hay Creek Rd.	
Geigertown Fire Co.		Phone: 610.286.6481
Gibraltar Fire Co.	Station #23	Mailing Address:
Gibraltar Fire Co.		3351 Main St.
Gibraltar Fire Co.	Station Location:	Birdsboro, PA 19508
Gibraltar Fire Co.	3351 Main St.	
Gibraltar Fire Co.		Phone: 610.404.4282
Greenfields Fire Co.	Station #55	Mailing Address:
Greenfields Fire Co.		2339 Bernville Rd.
Greenfields Fire Co.	Station Location:	Reading, PA 19601
Greenfields Fire Co.	2339 Bernville Rd	
Greenfields Fire Co.		Phone: 610.374.9283
Hamburg Fire Co.	Station #61	Mailing Address:
Hamburg Fire Co.		PO Box 255
Hamburg Fire Co.	Station Location:	Hamburg, PA 19526
Hamburg Fire Co.	123 S. 4th St.	
Hamburg Fire Co.		Phone: 610.562.3056
Hereford Fire Co.	Station #58	Mailing Address:
Hereford Fire Co.		PO Box 7
Hereford Fire Co.	Station Location:	Hereford, PA 18056
Hereford Fire Co.	1153 Gravel Pike	
Hereford Fire Co.		Phone: 215.679.4770
Kempton Fire Co.	Station #44	Mailing Address:
Kempton Fire Co.		PO Box 62
Kempton Fire Co.	Station Location:	Kempton, PA 19529
Kempton Fire Co.	2403B Route 143	
Kempton Fire Co.		Phone: 610.756.0097
Kenhorst Fire Co.	Station #69	Mailing Address:
Kenhorst Fire Co.		305 S.Kenhorst Blvd.
Kenhorst Fire Co.	Station Location:	Shillington, PA 19607
Kenhorst Fire Co.	305 S.Kenhorst Blvd.	
Kenhorst Fire Co.		Phone: 610.775.1914
Keystone Water Rescue - Boyertown	Station #16	Mailing Address:
Keystone Water Rescue - Boyertown		240 N. Walnut St.
Keystone Water Rescue - Boyertown	Station Location:	Boyertown, PA 19512
Keystone Water Rescue - Boyertown	240 N. Walnut St.	
Keystone Water Rescue - Boyertown		Phone: 610.367.2200
Kutztown Fire Co.	Station #46	Mailing Address:
Kutztown Fire Co.		PO Box 31
Kutztown Fire Co.	Station Location:	Kutztown, PA 19530
Kutztown Fire Co.	310 Noble St.	
Kutztown Fire Co.		Phone: 610.683.0866
Leesport Fire Co.	Station #37	
Leesport Fire Co.		Mailing Address:
Leesport Fire Co.	Station Location:	PO Box 777
Leesport Fire Co.	18 E. Wall St.	Leesport, PA 19533
Leesport Fire Co.		Phone: 610.926.4090
Lower Alsace Fire Co.	Station #4	Mailing Address:
Lower Alsace Fire Co.		1206 Roosevelt Ave.
Lower Alsace Fire Co.	Station Location:	Reading, PA 19606
Lower Alsace Fire Co.	1206 Roosevelt Ave.	
Lower Alsace Fire Co.		Phone: 610.779.4200
Lyons Fire Co.	Station #35	Mailing Address:
Lyons Fire Co.		PO Box 5
Lyons Fire Co.	Station Location:	Lyons, PA 19536
Lyons Fire Co.	111 E. Park Ave.	
Lyons Fire Co.		Phone: 610.682.7936
Marion Fire Co.	Station #52	Mailing Address:
Marion Fire Co.		4127 Conrad Weiser Pkw.
Marion Fire Co.	Station Location:	Womelsdorf, PA, PA 19567
Marion Fire Co.	4127 Conrad Weiser Pkw.	
Marion Fire Co.		Phone: 610.589.5259
Mohnton Fire Co.	Station #57	Mailing Address:
Mohnton Fire Co.		100 E. Summit St.
Mohnton Fire Co.	Station Location:	Mohnton, PA 19540
Mohnton Fire Co.	100 E. Summit St.	
Mohnton Fire Co.		Phone: 610.777.6479
Monarch Fire Co.	Station #6	Mailing Address:
Monarch Fire Co.		50 Pennsylvania Ave.
Monarch Fire Co.	Station Location:	Monocacy, PA 19542
Monarch Fire Co.	50 Pennsylvania Ave.	
Monarch Fire Co.		Phone: 610.385.3310
Mt. Aetna Fire Co.	Station #28	Mailing Address:
Mt. Aetna Fire Co.		PO Box 115
Mt. Aetna Fire Co.	Station Location:	Mt. Aetna, PA 19544
Mt. Aetna Fire Co.	14 W. Tanner St.	
Mt. Aetna Fire Co.		Phone: 717.933.8945
Mt. Penn Fire Co.	Station #1	Mailing Address:
Mt. Penn Fire Co.		2711 Grant St.
Mt. Penn Fire Co.	Station Location:	Reading, PA 19606
Mt. Penn Fire Co.	2711 Grant St.	
Mt. Penn Fire Co.		Phone: 610.779.6723
Mt. Pleasant Fire Co.	Station #30	Mailing Address:
Mt. Pleasant Fire Co.		5664 Mt. Pleasant Rd.
Mt. Pleasant Fire Co.	Station Location:	Bernville, PA 19506
Mt. Pleasant Fire Co.	5664 Mt. Pleasant Rd.	
Mt. Pleasant Fire Co.		Phone: 610.488.1968
Muhlenberg Township Fire & Rescue	Station #66-1	Mailing Address:
Muhlenberg Township Fire & Rescue		115 Madison Ave.
Muhlenberg Township Fire & Rescue	Station Location:	Reading, PA 19605
Muhlenberg Township Fire & Rescue	115 Madison Ave.	
Muhlenberg Township Fire & Rescue		Phone: 610.921.3393
Muhlenberg Township Fire & Rescue	Station #66-2	Mailing Address:
Muhlenberg Township Fire & Rescue		115 Madison Ave.
Muhlenberg Township Fire & Rescue	Station Location:	Reading, PA 19605
Muhlenberg Township Fire & Rescue	800 Tuckertown Rd.	
Muhlenberg Township Fire & Rescue		Phone: 610.916.5918
Muhlenberg Township Fire & Rescue	Station #66-3	Mailing Address:
Muhlenberg Township Fire & Rescue		PO Box 217
Muhlenberg Township Fire & Rescue	Station Location:	Temple, PA 19560
Muhlenberg Township Fire & Rescue	4963 Kutztown Rd.	
Muhlenberg Township Fire & Rescue		Phone: 610.929.8050
Oley Fire Co.	Station #5	Mailing Address:
Oley Fire Co.		PO Box 219
Oley Fire Co.	Station Location:	Oley, PA 19547
Oley Fire Co.	477A Main St.	
Oley Fire Co.		Phone: 610.987.6363
Port Clinton Fire Co.	Station #77	Mailing Address:
Port Clinton Fire Co.		15 Broad St.
Port Clinton Fire Co.	Station Location:	Port Clinton, PA 19549
Port Clinton Fire Co.	15 Broad St.	
Port Clinton Fire Co.		Phone: 610.562.5499
Reading Fire Dept.	Station Location:	Mailing Address:
Reading Fire Dept.	815 Washington St.	815 Washington St.
Reading Fire Dept.		Reading, PA 19601
Reading Fire Dept.		Phone: 610.655.6080
Rehrersburg Fire Co.	Station #27	Mailing Address:
Rehrersburg Fire Co.		PO Box 201
Rehrersburg Fire Co.	Station Location:	Rehrersburg, PA 19550
Rehrersburg Fire Co.	240 Godfrey St.	
Rehrersburg Fire Co.		Phone: 717.933.8228
Robesonia Fire Co.	Station #26	Mailing Address:
Robesonia Fire Co.		32 W. Penn Ave.
Robesonia Fire Co.	Station Location:	Robesonia, PA 19551
Robesonia Fire Co.	32 W. Penn Ave.	
Robesonia Fire Co.		Phone: 610.693.5187
Ruscombmanor Fire Co.	Station #34	Mailing Address:
Ruscombmanor Fire Co.		3721 Pricetown Rd.
Ruscombmanor Fire Co.	Station Location:	Fleetwood, PA 19522
Ruscombmanor Fire Co.	3721 Pricetown Rd.	
Ruscombmanor Fire Co.		Phone: 610.944.9851
Seisholtzville Fire Co.	Station #39	Mailing Address:
Seisholtzville Fire Co.		PO Box 132
Seisholtzville Fire Co.	Station Location:	Macungie, PA 18062
Seisholtzville Fire Co.	24 St. Peter's Rd.	
Seisholtzville Fire Co.		Phone: 610.845.2102
Shartlesville Fire Co.	Station #41	Mailing Address:
Shartlesville Fire Co.		PO Box 7
Shartlesville Fire Co.	Station Location:	Shartlesville, PA 19554
Shartlesville Fire Co.	5637 Old Route 22	
Shartlesville Fire Co.		Phone: 610.488.0863
Shillington Fire Co.	Station #36	Mailing Address:
Shillington Fire Co.		221 Catherine St.
Shillington Fire Co.	Station Location:	Shillington, PA 19607
Shillington Fire Co.	221 Catherine St.	
Shillington Fire Co.		Phone: 610.777.7284
Shoemakersville Fire Co.	Station #40	Mailing Address:
Shoemakersville Fire Co.		300 Church Ave.
Shoemakersville Fire Co.	Station Location:	Shoemakersville, PA 19555
Shoemakersville Fire Co.	300 Church Ave.	
Shoemakersville Fire Co.		Phone: 610.562.8091
Strausstown Fire Co.	Station #50	Mailing Address:
Strausstown Fire Co.		PO Box 125
Strausstown Fire Co.	Station Location:	Strausstown, PA 19559
Strausstown Fire Co.	50 East Ave.	
Strausstown Fire Co.		Phone: 610.488.1770
Topton Fire Co.	Station #21	Mailing Address:
Topton Fire Co.		PO Box 8
Topton Fire Co.	Station Location:	Topton, PA 19562
Topton Fire Co.	600 State St.	
Topton Fire Co.		Phone: 610.682.7600
Township of Spring Fire Dept.	Station #85	Mailing Address:
Township of Spring Fire Dept.		2301 Monroe Ave.
Township of Spring Fire Dept.	Station Location:	West Lawn, PA 19609
Township of Spring Fire Dept.	2301 Monroe Ave.	
Township of Spring Fire Dept.		Phone: 610.898.1452
Twin Valley Fire Dept.	Station #69	
Twin Valley Fire Dept.	Station Location:	
Twin Valley Fire Dept.	3307 Main St.	
Twin Valley Fire Dept.	Mailing Address:	
Twin Valley Fire Dept.	PO Box 181	
Twin Valley Fire Dept.	Elverson, PA 19520	
Virginville Fire Co.	Station #33	Mailing Address:
Virginville Fire Co.		PO Box 122
Virginville Fire Co.	Station Location:	Virginville, PA 19534
Virginville Fire Co.	20 1st St.	
Virginville Fire Co.		Phone: 610.562.8389
Walnuttown Fire Co.	Station #32	Mailing Address:
Walnuttown Fire Co.		535 Park Rd.
Walnuttown Fire Co.	Station Location:	Fleetwood, PA 19522
Walnuttown Fire Co.	535 Park Rd.	
Walnuttown Fire Co.		Phone: 610.562.8389
West Reading Fire Co.	Station #64	Mailing Address:
West Reading Fire Co.		223 Playground Dr.
West Reading Fire Co.	Station Location:	West Reading, PA 19611
West Reading Fire Co.	223 Playground Dr.	
West Reading Fire Co.		Phone: 610.372.9621
Western Berks Fire Dept.	Station #18-1	Mailing Address:
Western Berks Fire Dept.		111 Stitzer Ave.
Western Berks Fire Dept.	Station Location:	Wernersville, PA 19565
Western Berks Fire Dept.	111 Stitzer Ave.	
Western Berks Fire Dept.		Phone: 610.678.1332
Western Berks Fire Dept.	Station #18-2	Mailing Address:
Western Berks Fire Dept.		111 Stitzer Ave.
Western Berks Fire Dept.	Station Location:	Wernersville, PA 19565
Western Berks Fire Dept.	836 Ruth St.	
Western Berks Fire Dept.		Phone: 610.678.6029
Western Berks Fire Dept.	Station #18-3	Mailing Address:
Western Berks Fire Dept.		111 Stitzer Ave.
Western Berks Fire Dept.	Station Location:	Wernersville, PA 19565
Western Berks Fire Dept.	1060 Fritztown Rd.	
Western Berks Fire Dept.		Phone: 610.678.0502
Western Berks Fire Dept.	Station #18-4	Mailing Address:
Western Berks Fire Dept.		111 Stitzer Ave.
Western Berks Fire Dept.	Station Location:	Wernersville, PA 19565
Western Berks Fire Dept.	505 Brownsville Rd.	
Western Berks Fire Dept.		Phone: 610.670.1939
Womelsdorf Fire Co.	Station #47	Mailing Address:
Womelsdorf Fire Co.		501 W. High St.
Womelsdorf Fire Co.	Station Location:	Womelsdorf, PA 19567
Womelsdorf Fire Co.	501 W. High St.	
Womelsdorf Fire Co.		Phone: 610.589.4645
Wyomissing Fire Dept.	Station #79	Mailing Address:
Wyomissing Fire Dept.		1259 Penn Ave.
Wyomissing Fire Dept.	Station Location:	Wyomissing, PA 19610
Wyomissing Fire Dept.	1259 Penn Ave.	
Wyomissing Fire Dept.		Phone: 610.375.4436

== Butler County ==
- Adams Area Fire District, Station 42
- Bruin VFD, Station 29
- Buffalo Township VFC, Station 27
- Butler Bureau of Fire, Station 1
- Butler Township Fire District, Station 3
- Callery VFD, Station 19
- Chicora VFD, Station 26
- Connoquenessing VFC, Station 12
- Cranberry Township VFC, Station 21
- East Butler VFD, Station 9
- Eau Claire VFD, Station 32
- Evans City Area VFD, Station 50
- Harmony Fire District, Station 22
- Harrisville VFD, Stsation 34
- Herman VFC, Station 10
- Lick Hill VFD, Station 8
- Marion Township VFC, Station 31
- Middlesex Township VFC, Station 16
- North Washington VFD, Station 30
- Oneida Valley VFC, Station 35
- Penn Township VFD, Station 11
- Petrolia VFD, Station 28
- Portersville-Muddycreek Township VFD, Station 24
- Prospect VFD, Station 13
- Sarver VFC, Station 36
- Saxonburg VFC, Station 15
- Slippery Rock VFC, Station 33
- Unionville VFC, Station 14
- Butler VA Hospital FD, Station 38
- West Sunbury VFD, Station 25
- Winfield VFC, Station 46

== Chester County ==
- Berywyn, Station 2
- Paoli, Station 3
- Malvern, Station 4
- East Whiteland, Station 5
- West Whiteland, Station 6
- Keystone Valley, Station 8
- Chester County Hazardous Materials Team, Station 15
- Union Fire Co, Station 21
- West Grove, Stations 12/22/23
- Avondale, Station 23
- Kennet Square, Station 24
- Longwood, Station 25
- Cochranville, Station 27
- Sadsburyville, Station 31
- Honey Brook, Station 33
- Wagontown, Station 35
- Po-Mar-Lin, Station 36
- Modena, Station 37
- Thorndale, Station 38
- West Bradford, Station 39
- Coatesville Fire Dept, Stations 41/43
- Westwood, Station 44
- Alert of Downingtown, Station 45
- Miniquas of Downingtown, Station 46
- Lionville, Station 47
- Glen Moore, Station 48
- East Brandywine, Station 49
- First West Chester Fire, Station 51
- Good Will Fire Co, Station 52
- Fame Fire Co, Station 53
- Goshen, Stations 54/56
- Kimberton, Station 61
- Ridge Fire Co, Station 62
- Liberty Fire Co, Station 63
- Norfolk Fire Co, Station 64
- Phoenixville Hook and Ladder, Station 65
- Friendship of Phoenixville, Station 66
- West End, Station 67
- Valley Forge, Station 68
- Twin Valley, Station 69
- Ludwig’s Corner, Station 73
- International Steel, Station 75
- Chester County Dive Rescue, Station 77

== Clarion County ==
- Callensburg VFD, Station 510
- Clarion Fire & Hose Co.1, Station 520
- East Brady VFD, Station 530
- Farmington Township VFD, Station 540
- Foxburg, Station 550
- Hawthorn VFD, Station 560
- Knox VFC, Station 570
- Limestone VFC, Station 580
- Millcreek Twp VFD, Station 590
- New Bethlehem Fire Co.1, Station 600
- Perry Township Fire Department, Station 610
- Rimersburg Hose Co, Station 620
- Shippenville-Elk Township VFD, Station 630
- Sligo VFD, Station 640
- St. Petersburg, Station 650
- Strattanville VFD, Station 660
- Washington Township VFD, Station 670

== Centre County ==
- Logan Fire Company #1
- Undine Fire Company #2 (Companies #1 and #2 make up the Bellefonte Fire Department #56)
- Boalsburg Fire Company #3
- Centre Hall Fire Company #4
- Alpha Fire Company #5 (State College)
- Snow Shoe Fire Company #6
- Gregg Township Fire Company #7
- Pleasant Gap Fire Department #8
- Citizen's Hook and Ladder Company #9 (Milesburg)
- Hope Fire Company #11
- Reliance Fire Company #12 (Companies #11 and #12 make up the Phillipsburg Fire Department #57)
- Mountain Top Fire Company #13 (Sandy Ridge)
- Howard Fire Company #14
- Port Matilda Fire Company #15
- Walker Township Fire Company #16
- Pine Glen Fire Company #17
- Millheim Fire Company #18
- Miles Township Fire Company #19
- University Park Airport ARFF #20
- Centre Region Hazardous Materials Response Team #55
- Eagle Response Services #81

== Clinton County ==
- Avis Fire Company, Station 8
- Beech Creek/Blanchard Fire Company, Station 9
- Castanea Fire Company, Station 3
- Chapman Township Fire Company, Station 27
- Citizen's Hose Company (Lock Haven), Station 6
- Citizen's Hose Company (South Renovo), Station 28
- Dunnstown Fire Company, Station 5
- Goodwill Hose Company (Flemington), Station 7
- Haneyville Fire Company, Station 18
- Hand In Hand Hose Company (Lock Haven), Station 1
- Hope Hose Company (Lock Haven), Station 2
- Kettle Creek Hose Company, Station 26
- Lamar Township Fire Company, Station 11
- Mill Hall Fire Company, Station 4
- Nittany Valley Fire Company (Lamar), Station 17
- Renovo Fire Department, Station 29
- Sugar Valley Fire Company, Station 13
- Wayne Township Fire Company, Station 10
- Woolrich Fire Company, Station 12

== Crawford County ==
- Bloomfield Township Fire Department 1
- Blooming Valley Fire Department 2
- Cambridge Springs Fire Department 3
- Centerville Fire Department 6
- Cherry Tree Fire Department
- Cochranton Fire Department 4
- Conneaut Lake Fire Department 7
- Fellows Club/Conneautville Fire Department 8
- East Mead Fire Department 9
- Fallowfield Fire Department 45
- Greenwood Fire Department 40
- Hayfield Fire Department 12
- Hydetown Fire Department 14
- Linesville Fire Department 15
- Meadville Fire Department 16
- North Shenango Fire Department 17
- Randolph Fire Department 18
- Saegertown Fire Department 19
- Spartansburg Fire Department 22
- Springboro Fire Department 21
- Summit Township Fire Department 20
- Titusville Fire Department 26
- Townville Fire Department 24
- Venango Fire Department 25
- Vernon Central Fire Department 23
- West Mead No. 1 Fire Department 28
- West Mead No. 2 Fire Department 29

== Dauphin County ==
- Harrisburg City
  - Harrisburg Bureau of Fire
  - Harrisburg River Rescue (Station 10)
- Millersburg Borough
  - Millersburg Vol. Fire Company (Station 20)
- Elizabethville Borough
  - Elizabethville Fire Department (Station 21)
- Lykens Borough
  - Liberty Hose Company #2 (station 22)
- Wiconisco Township
  - Wiconisco Vol. Fire Company (Station 23)
- Williamstown Borough
  - Liberty Hose Company #1 (Station 24)
- Berrysburg Borough
  - Berrysburg & Community Fire Company (Station 26)
- Gratz Borough
  - Gratz Area Fire Company (Station 27)
- Pillow Borough
  - Pillow Fire Company #1 (Station 28)
- Halifax Borough
  - Halifax Fire Department (Station 29)
- Pennbrook Borough
  - Citizen's Fire Co. 1 of Penbrook (Station 30)
- Susquehanna Township
  - Progress Vol. Fire Company (Station 32)
  - Rescue Fire Company (Station 37)
- Lower Paxton Township
  - Colonial Park Fire Company (Station 33)
  - Paxtonia Fire Company (Station 34)
  - Linglestown Fire Company (Station 35)
- West Hanover Township
  - West Hanover Township Fire Company (Station 36, 36-1, & 36-2)
- Dauphin Borough
  - Dauphin-Middle Paxton Fire Company (Station 38)
- East Hanover Township
  - Grantville Fire Company (Station 39)
- Paxtang Borough
  - Paxtang Fire Company (Station 40)
- Swatara Township
  - Bressler Fire Company (Station 41)
  - Rutherford Fire Company (Station 45)
  - Chambers Hill Fire Company (Station 456)
  - Swatara Township Volunteer Fire Company (Station 49)
- Hummelstown Borough
  - Chemical Fire Company of Hummelstown (Station 46)
- South Hanover Township
  - Union Deposit Vol. Fire Company (Station 47 & 47-1)
- Derry Township
  - Hershey Vol. Fire Company (Station 48)
- Steelton Borough
  - Steelton Vol. Fire Department (Station 50)
- Londonderry Township
  - Londonderry Fire Company (Station 54)
- Highspire Borough
  - Citizen Fire Company #1 (Station 55)
- Harrisburg International Airport
  - Harrisburg International Airport Fire Department (Station 70)
- Harrisburg Air National Guard Base
  - 193rd Air National Guard Fire Department (Station 71)
- Cleveland-Cliffs Steelton Steel Mill
  - Cleveland-Cliffs Steelton Fire Department (Station 73)
- Three Mile Island Nuclear Generating Station
  - Three Mile Island Fire Brigade (Station 74)
- Middletown Borough
  - Middletown Vol. Fire Department (Station 88)

== Delaware County ==
- Folcroft Fire Company
- Norwood Fire Company
- Clifton Heights Fire Company
- Darby Fire Company #1
- Glenolden Fire Company #1
- Collingdale Fire Company #1
- Ridley Park Fire Company
- Prospect Park Fire Department
- Sharon Hill Fire Company
- Colwyn Borough Fire Company
- Morton - Rutledge Fire Company
- Eddystone Fire Company
- Swarthmore Fire and Protective Association
- Radnor Fire Company
- Yeadon Fire Company
- Folsom Fire Company
- Lansdowne Fire Company
- Aston Fire Company
- Garrettford Drexel Hill Fire Company
- Darby Fire Patrol #2
- Milbourne Fire Company
- Media Fire Hook and Ladder Company
- Highland Park Fire Company
- Llanerch Fire Company
- Brookline Fire Company
- Upper Darby Fire Company #1
- Oakmont Fire Company
- Lower Chichester Volunteer Fire Company
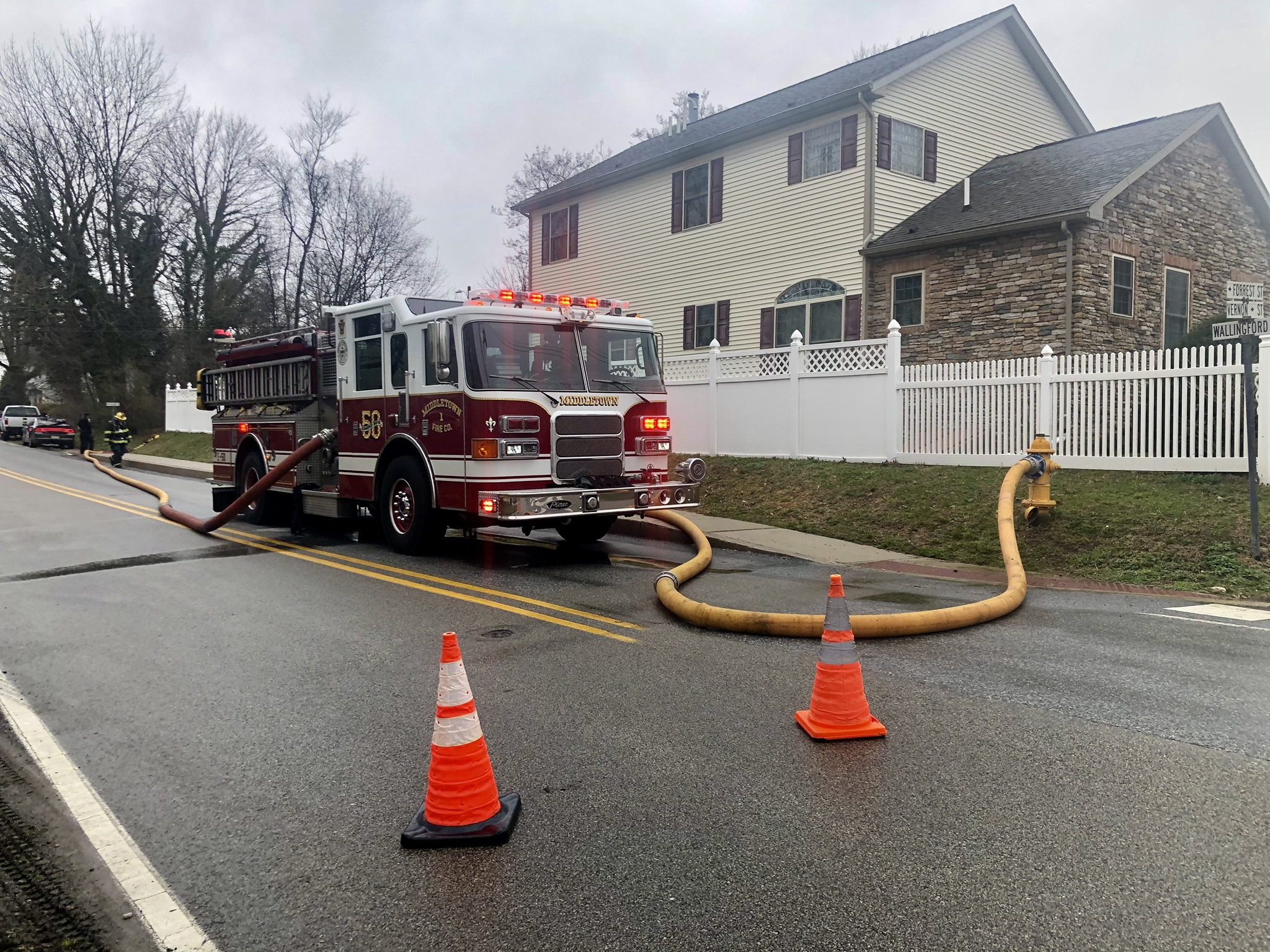
  Engine 50 of Middletown Fire Company serving as the engine company on a residential building fire in Nether Providence on March 25th, 2021.
- Boothwyn Fire Company
- Newtown Square Fire Company
- Collingdale Fire Company # 2
- Holmes Fire Company
- Springfield Fire Company
- Parkside Fire Company
- Rocky Run Fire Company
- Chester Township Company
- Tinicum Township Fire Company
- Milmont Park Fire Company
- Middletown Fire Company No. 1
- South Media Fire Company
- Brookhaven Fire Company
- Broomall Fire Company
- Ogden Fire Company
- Manoa Fire Company
- Upland Fire Company
- Bon Air Fire Company
- Concordville Fire & Protective Association
- Reliance Hook and Ladder Company
- S. M. Vaculain Fire Company
- Green Ridge Fire Company
- Edgemont Fire Company
- Garden City Fire Company
- Bethel Township Hose Company
- Woodlyn Fire Company
- Marcus Hook Fire Company
- Leedom Fire Company
- Chester Heights Fire Company
- Rose Tree Fire Company
- Primos Secane Westbrook Park Fire Company
- Boeing Fire Department
- Chester Fire Department Station. 81
- Chester Fire Department Station. 82

== Erie County ==
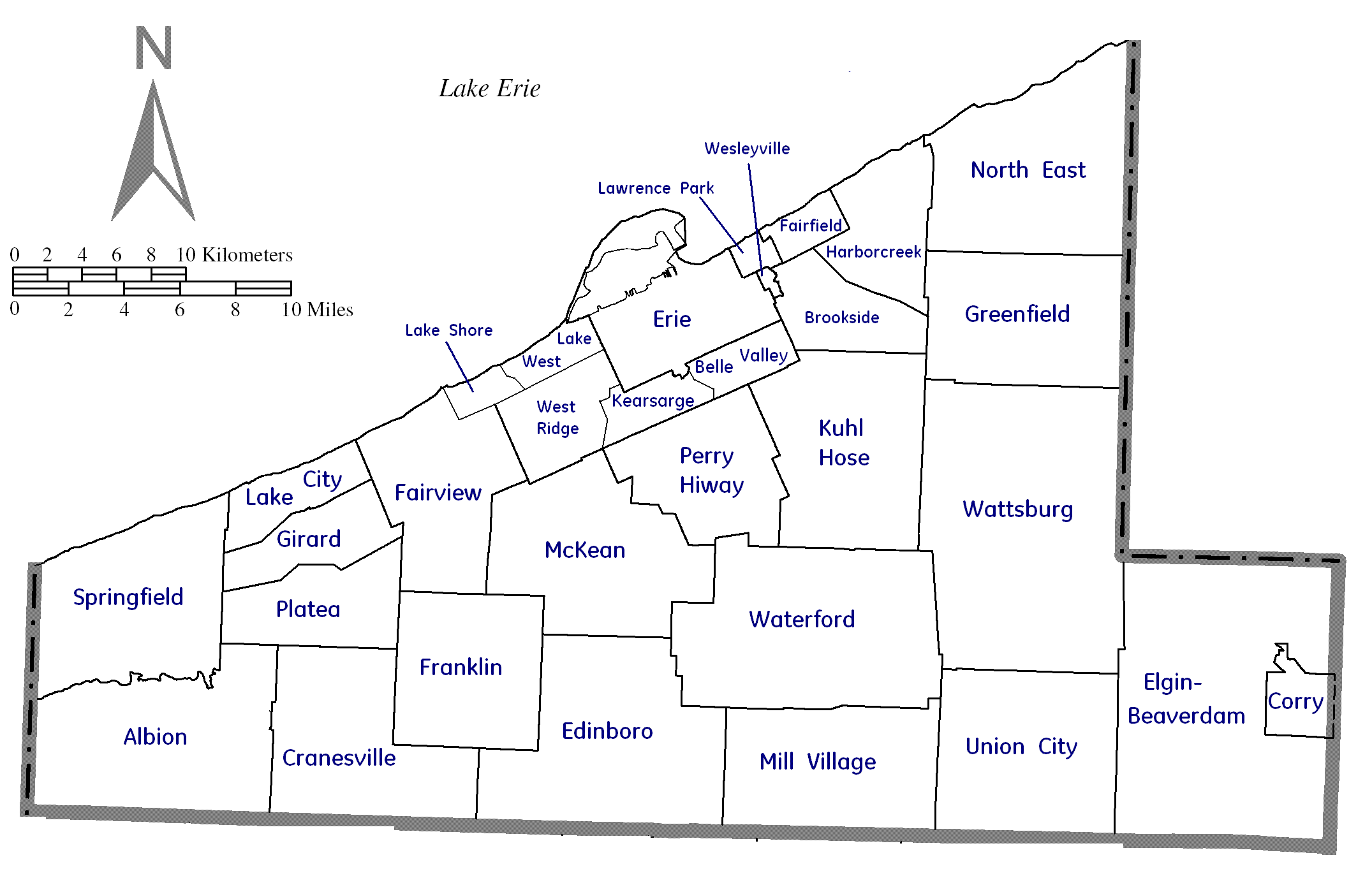

- A.F. Dobler Hose & Ladder Company (Girard Boro, Girard Township) Station 54
- Albion VFD (Albion Boro, Conneaut Township), Station 62
- Belle Valley Fire Department, Station 36
- Brookside Fire Company, Station 24
- Corry Fire Department, Station 107
- Cranesville Fire Department, Station 60
- Crescent Hose Company #2, Station 21
- Edinboro VFD, Station 38
- Elgin-Beaverdam Dam Hose Company, Station 66
- Erie International Airport Crash-Fire-Rescue, Station 82
- Erie County HazMat, Station 80
- Erie Fire Department, Station 32
- Fairfield Hose Company, Station 26
- Fairview Fire Department
  - Fairview Fire & Rescue, Station 52
  - Fairview Fire Department, Station 53
- Franklin Township Fire Department, Station 72
- Fuller Hose Company No.1, Station 20
- Greenfield Township VFC, Station 70
- Harborcreek VFD, Station 22
- Kearsarge VFD, Station 44
- Kuhl Hose Company
  - Kuhl Hose Company, Station 68
  - Kuhl Hose Company, Station 69
- Lake City Fire Company
  - Lake City Fire Company, Station 56
  - Lake City Fire Company, Station 57
- Lake Shore Fire Department, Station 50
- Lawrence Park Fire Department, Station 28
- McKean Hose Company, Station 40
  - Millcreek Response Team, Station 92
- Mill Village Fire Department, Station 12
- Perry Hi-Way Hose Company
  - Perry Hi-Way Hose Company, Station 42
  - Perry Hi-Way Hose Company, Station 43
- Platea Fire Department, Station 58
- Springfield Fire Department, Station 64
- Stancliff Hose Company, Station 14
- Union City Fire Department, Station 113
- Wattsburg Hose Company
  - Wattsburg Hose Company, Station 17
  - Wattsburg Hose Company, Station 18
- Wesleyville Hose Company, Station 30
- West Lake Fire Department
  - West Lake Fire Department. Station 48
  - West Lake Fire Department, Station 49
- West Ridge Fire Department
  - West Ridge Fire Department, Station 44
  - West Ridge Fire Department, Station 47

== Forest County ==
- Marienville Volunteer Fire Company
- Tionesta Volunteer Fire Department
- West Hickory Volunteer Fire Department.

== Huntingdon County ==
- Alexandria VFD, Station 1
- Mapleton VFC, Station 2
- Marklesburg VFC, Station 3
- Petersburg VFD, Station 4
- Mount Union VFD, Station 7
- Orbisonia-Rockhill VFC, Station 9
- Smithfield VFC, Station 10
- Shavers Creek VFC, Station 11
- Three Springs VFC, Station 12
- Shade Gap VFC, Station 14
- R.W.&BT VFC, Station 17
- Stone Creek Valley VFC, Station 19
- Mill Creek VFC, Station 20
- Trough Creek Valley VFC, Station 21
- Warriors Mark VFC, Station 22
- Huntingdon Regional Fire & Rescue, Dept 65 -Walker TWP, Station 65-1 -Huntingdon Borough, Station 65-2 -Oneida TWP, Station 65-3

== Indiana County ==
- Plumville VFD, Station 350
- Cherry Tree VFC, Station 520

== Lackawanna County ==
- Archbald Fire Department, Station 21
  - Archbald Hose Company No. 1, Station 21-1
  - Black Diamond Hose Company No. 2, Station 21-2
  - East Side Hose Company No. 4, Station 21-3
- Blakely Hose Company, Station 22
- Carbondale City Fire Department, Station 51
  - Mitchell Hose Company, Station 51-1
  - Columbia Fire Company, Station 51-5
- Chinchilla Hose Company (South Abington Township) Station 2
- Clarks Summit Fire Department, Station 4
- Covington Fire Department, Station 14
- Dalton Fire Company, Station 5
- Dunmore Fire Department, Station 6
- Eagle Hose Company No. 1 (Dickson City Borough), Station 23
- Elmhurst-Roaring Brook Fire Department, Station 15
- Eynon Hose Company No. 3, Station 33
- Fleetville Fire Company (Benton Township), Station 63
- Gouldsboro Volunteer Fire Company, Station 55
- Grattan-Singer Hose Company No. 1 (Fell Township), Station 61
- Greenfield Township Volunteer Fire Company, Station 24
- Greenwood Hose Company (Moosic Borough), Station 98
- Jefferson Township Fire Department, Station 29
- Jermyn Fire Department, Station 58
  - Crystal Fire Company, Station 58-1
  - Artisan Fire Company, Station 58-2
- Jessup Hose Company No. 1, Station 31
- Jessup Hose Company No. 2, Station 25
- Justus Fire Company (Scott Township, Justus), Station 28
- Madisonville Fire Department (Madison Township), Station 56
- Mayfield Fire Department
  - Mayfield Hose Company No. 1, Station 59-1
  - Whitmore Hose Company No. 2, Station 59-2
  - William Walker Hose Company, Station 59-3
- Meredith Hose Company (Carbondale Township), Station 60
- Moscow Fire and Hose Company, Station 7
- Newton/Ransom Volunteer Fire Department, Station 8
- Old Forge Fire Department, Station 93
  - Old Forge Fire Company, Station 93-1
  - Lawrence Hose Company, Station 93-1
  - Eagle McClure Hose Company, Station 93-3
- Olyphant Fire Department, Station 26
  - Excelsior Hose Company No. 1, Station 26-1
  - Olyphant Hose and Engine Company No. 2, Station 26-2
  - Eureka Hose Company No. 4, Station 26-4
  - Liberty Hose Company No. 6, Station 26-6
  - Queen City Hose Company No. 8, Station 26-8
- Scott Township Hose Company, Station 36
- Scranton Fire Department, Station 50
  - Fire Headquarters
  - Rescue Company No. 1
  - Engine Company No. 2
  - Truck Company No. 4
  - Engine Company No. 7
  - Engine Company No. 8
  - Engine Company No. 10
- Springbrook Township Volunteer Fire Department, Station 53
- Taylor Fire Department, Station 95
  - Taylor Fire Company, Station 95-1
  - Taylor Fire and Rescue, Station 95-2
- Thornhurst Fire Department, Station 54
- Throop Fire Department, Station 27
  - Thoop Hose Company No. 1, Station 27-1
  - Throop Hose Company No. 2, Station 27-2
  - Volunteer Hose Company of Throop, Station 27-3
- Whites Crossing Fire and Rescue (Carbondale Township), Station 62
- Wilson Fire Company (Blakely Borough, Peckville), Station 20

== Lawrence County ==
- Bessemer Borough Fire Department, Station 400
- Chewton Fire Department, Station 1800
- Ellwood City Borough Fire Department, Station 2300
- Enon Valley Borough Fire Department, Station 2100
- Hickory Township Fire Department, Station 300
- Mahoning Township Fire Department, Station 200
- Neshannock Township Fire Department, Station 100
- New Beaver Borough Fire Department, Station 1600
- City of New Castle Fire Department, Station 2400
- New Wilmington Borough Fire Department, Station 1100
- North Beaver Township Fire Department, Station 700
- Pulaski Township Fire Department, Station 500
- Scott Township Fire Department, Station 1500
- Shenango Area Fire District, Station 1200
- Slippery Rock Township Fire Department, Station 1400
- Taylor Township Fire Department, Station 800
- Union Township Fire Department, Station 1300
- Volant Borough Fire Department, Station 600
- Wampum Borough Fire Department, Station 1700
- Wayne Township Fire Department, Station 1900
- Wurtemburg Perry Township Fire Department, Station 2200

== Lehigh County ==
- Allentown Fire Department
- America Hook and Ladder 25/53
- Alpha Fire Company
- Altoona City Fire
- Beale Township Fire Department (Juniata County)
- Bellwood Fire Department
- Bethlehem Fire Department
- Benton Fire Company
- Bernville Fire Company (Berks County)
- Bristol Consolidated Fire Department
- Bristol Fire Co.
- Cetronia Volunteer Fire Department
- Chester Hill Hose Company (Clearfield County station 14)
- Connellsville Township Volunteer Fire Department
- Citizens Hose Company #5 (County Station #6)
- Columbia Fire Company (Clearfield County station 22)
- Croydon Fire Company
- Dawson Volunteer Fire Department
- Delano Fire Company No. 1
- Delaware County Firefighting
- Dunnstown Fire Company
- Reliance Hose Company #1, Elisabethville
- Elmhurst-Roaring Brook Volunteer Fire Company
- Goodwill Hose Co., Bristol Borough
- Hand-In-Hand Hose Company #1
- Harleysville Volunteer Fire Company
- Hamlin Fire and Rescue
- Hershey Fire Department
- Hope Hose Company #2, Lock Haven
- Keystone Valley Volunteer Fire Company No. 08
- Kimberton Fire Company
- Lake Carey Volunteer Fire Company, Lemon Township, Wyoming County
- Levittown Fire Company No. 1
- Levittown Fire Company No. 2
- Logan Township Fire
- Malvern Fire Company
- Mehoopany Vol. Fire Co.
- Minersville Fire Rescue
- Montgomery Volunteer Fire Department
- Morrisville Fire Department
- Northmoreland Township Volunteer Fire Company
- Nuremberg-Weston Volunteer Fire Company
- Old Forge Fire Department
- Radnor Fire Company, Wayne
- Rangers Hose Company, Girardville
- Reading Fire Department
- Republic Volunteer Fire Company
- Rosedale Volunteer Fire Department
- Shanksville Volunteer Fire Department
- Scalp Level and Paint Borough Fire Company
- South Media Fire Co.
- Springdale Volunteer Fire Department
- Union Fire Company
- Thompson Hose Company
- Tilbury Plymouth Twp 169
- Township of Spring Volunteer Fire Rescue
- Trevose Fire Company 4, Feasterville-Trevose
- Trevose Fire Company 84
- Towamencin Volunteer Fire Company
- Union Fire Company No. 1, Oxford
- United Fire Co., Montrose
- Upper Darby Fire Department
- West Chester Fire Department
- Worcester Volunteer Fire Company

== Luzerne County ==
- Ashley Fire Department (St. 111)
- Avoca Fire Department (St. 112)
- Bear Creek Fire Department (St. 113)
- Shades Creek Fire Department (St. 115)
- Valley Regional Fire Department (St. 116)
- Mocanaqua Volunteer Fire Company #1 (St. 118)
- Pond Hill-Lily Lake Fire Department (St. 218)
- Courtdale Fire Department (St. 119)
- Back Mountain Regional Fire Department (St. 121)
- Kunkle Fire Department (St. 122)
- Dennison Township Fire Department (St. 123)
- Dorrance Township Volunteer Fire Department (St. 124)
- Dupont Fire Department (St. 125)
- Germania Hose Company (St. 126)
- Excelsior Hose Company (St. 226)
- Edwardsville Fire Department (St. 127)
- Exeter Township Fire Department (St. 128)
- Harding Fire Department (St. 129)
- Mt. Zion Fire Department (St. 229)
- Fairmount Township Volunteer Fire Department (St. 131)
- Mountain Top Hose Company No. 1 (St. 132)
- Fearnots Fire Department (St. 134)
- Franklin Township Fire Department (St. 135)
- Freeland Fire Department (St. 136)
- Hanover Township Fire Department (St. 137)
- Harvey's Lake Fire Department (St. 138)
- Hazleton City Fire Department (St. 139)
- Hazle Township Fire Department (St. 141)
- Harwood Fire Department (St. 241)
- Hobbie Volunteer Fire Department (St. 142)
- Hughestown Fire Department (St. 143)
- Hunlock Township Fire Department (St. 144)
- Huntington Fire Department (St. 145)
- Jackson Township Fire Department (St. 146)
- Jenkins Fire Department (St. 148)
- Kingston/Forty Fort Fire Department (St. 149)
- Trucksville Volunteer Fire Department (St. 151)
- Shavertown Volunteer Fire Company (St. 251)
- Laflin Borough Fire Department (St. 152)
- Larksville Volunteer Fire Company #1 (St. 154)
- Laurel Run Volunteer Fire Department (St. 155)
- Lake Silkworth Volunteer Fire Department (St. 256)
- Idetown Fire Department (St. 356)
- Luzerne Borough Fire Department (St. 157)
- Nanticoke City Fire Department (St. 158)
- Nescopeck Borough Volunteer Fire Department (St. 159)
- Nescopeck Township Fire Department (St. 161)
- Newport Township Fire Department (St. 163)
- Nuangola Volunteer Fire Department (St. 164)
- Pittston City Fire Department (St. 165)
- Pittston Township Fire Department (St. 166)
- Plains Township Fire Department (St. 167)
- Plymouth Borough Volunteer Fire Company #1 (St. 168)
- Goodwill Hose Company #2 (St. 168)
- Elm Hill Fire Company #3 (St. 168)
- Plymouth Township Fire Department (St. 169)
- Pringle Volunteer Fire Department (St. 171)
- Sweet Valley Volunteer Fire Company (St. 173)
- Salem Township Fire Department (St. 174)
- Shickshinny Borough Fire Department (St. 175)
- Slocum Township Volunteer Fire Company (St. 176)
- Sugarloaf Township Volunteer Fire Department (St. 177)
- Sugarnotch Volunteer Fire Department (St. 178)
- Brodericks Fire Company #2 (St. 279)
- Maltby Fire Rescue #3 (St. 379)
- West Hazleton Fire Department (St. 183)
- West Pittston Fire Department (St. 184)
- West Wyoming Fire Company #1 (St. 185)
- West Wyoming Fire Company #1 (St. 285)
- White Haven Fire Company #1 (St. 186)
- Wilkes-Barre City Fire Department (St. 187)
- Wilkes-Barre Township Fire Department (St. 188)
- Wright Township Volunteer Fire Department (St. 189)
- Wyoming Borough Fire Company #1 (St. 191)
- Wyoming Borough Fire Company #2 (St. 291)
- Yatesville Fire Department (St. 192)

== Lycoming County ==
- Antes Fort VFD, Station 31
- Black Forest VFC, Station 36
- Brown Township VFC, Station 35
- Citizen's Hose Co (Jersey Shore), Station 45
- Clinton Township VFC, Station 12
- Duboistown Fire Dept, Station 8
- Eldred Township VFC, Station 22
- Hepburn Township VFC, Station 15
- Hughesville VFC, Station 24
- Independent Hose Co (Jersey Shore), Station 3
- Lairdsville Community VFC, Station 27
- Loyalsock Volunteer Fire Company, Station 18
- Montgomery VFC, Station 13
- Muncy Area VFC, Station 39
- Muncy Township Vol Fire Co (Pennsdale), Station 23
- Nippenose Valley VFC, Station 6
- Nisbet VFC, Station 7
- Old Lycoming Township VFC, Station 14
- Picture Rocks VFC, Station 26
- Plunketts Creek Township VFD, Station 25
- Ralston VFC, Station 17
- South Williamsport VFD, Station 5
- Trout Run VFC, Station 16
- Unityville VFC, Station 32
- Washington Township VFC, Station 21
- Waterville Fire Dept, Station 28
- Williamsport Bureau of Fire, Station 1
- Williamsport Regional Airport, Station 19
- Willing Hand Hose Co (Montoursville), Station 20
- Woodward Township VFC, Station 2

== Montgomery County ==
- Glenside Fire Company, Station 1
- La Mott Fire Company, Station 2
- Elkins Park Fire Company, Station 3
- Cheltenham Fire Company, Station 4
- Flourtown Fire Company, Station 6
- Wissahickon Fire Company, Station 7
- Huntingdon Valley Fire Company No. 1, Station 8
- Rockledge Volunteer Fire Department No. 1, Station 9
- Willow Grove Fire Company, Station 10
- Bryn Athyn Fire Company, Station 11
- Colmar Volunteer Fire Company, Station 12
- Lansdale Fairmount Fire Company, Station 14
- Horsham Fire Company, Station 15
- Independent Fire Company No. 2, Station 16
- Hatfield Fire Company, Station 17
- Fire Department of Montgomery Township, Station 18
- Penn Wynne/Overbrook Hills Fire Company, Station 21
- Belmont Hills Fire Company, Station 22
- Bryn Mawr Fire Company, Station 23
- Gladwyne Fire Company, Station 24
- Merion Fire Company of Ardmore, Station 25
- Narberth Fire Company, Station 26
- Norristown Fire Department, Station 27
  - Norris Hose Fire Company, Station 27A
  - Montgomery Hose Company, Station 27B
  - Humane Fire Company No. 1, Station 27C
  - Fairmount Engine Company No. 2, Station 27D
  - Hancock Fire Company, Station 27E
- Union Fire Association, Station 28
- Barren Hill Volunteer Fire Company, Station 29
- Bridgeport Fire Company, Station 31
- Good Will Fire Company, Station 32
- Centre Square Fire Company, Station 33
- Collegeville Fire Company No. 1, Station 34
- Conshohocken Fire Company No. 2, Station 55A
- Washington Fire Company, Station 55B
- New Hanover Township Fire Company No. 1, Station 37
- East Greenville Fire Company, Station 38
- George Clay Steam Fire Engine & Hose Co No. 1, Station 39
- North Penn Goodwill Service, Station 41
- Green Lane Fire Company, Station 42
- Plymouth Fire Company No. 1, Station 43
- Harmonville Fire Company No. 1, Station 44
- Spring Mill Fire Company No. 1, Station 45
- Jefferson Fire Company No. 1, Station 46
- King of Prussia Volunteer Fire Company, Station 47
- Swedeland Volunteer Fire Company No. 1, Station 48
- Swedesburg Volunteer Fire Company, Station 49
- Limerick Fire Department, Station 51
  - Limerick Fire Department - Limerick, Station 51A
  - Limerick Fire Department - Linfield, Station 51B
- Lower Frederick Fire Company, Station 52
- Lower Providence Township Fire Department, Station 53
- Mont Clare Fire Company, Station 55
- Stowe West End Fire Company No. 1, Station 57
- Sanatoga Fire Company, Station 58
- Ringing Hill Fire Company, Station 59
- Norriton Fire Engine Company, Station 61
- North Penn Volunteer Fire Company, Station 62
- Oaks Fire Company, Station 63
- Telford Volunteer Diving & Rescue Unit, Station 64
- Pennsburg Fire Company, Station 65
- Perkiomen Township Fire Company No. 1, Station 66
- Gilbertsville Fire Company, Station 67
- Sassamansville Fire Company, Station 68
- Pottstown Fire Department, Station 69
  - Goodwill Fire Company, Station 69A
  - Philadelphia Steam, Station 69B
  - North End Fire Company, Station 69D
- Red Hill Fire Company, Station 71
- Tylersport Fire Company, Station 72
- Schwenksville Fire Company, Station 73
- Perseverance Fire Company, Station 74
- Telford Volunteer Fire Company, Station 75
- Towamencin Volunteer Fire Company, Station 76
- Trappe Fire Company, Station 77
- Upper Salford Volunteer Fire Company, Station 78
- Upper Pottsgrove Township Fire Company No. 1, Station 79
- Upper Gwynedd Township Fire Department, Station 80
- Wyndmoor Hose Company No. 1, Station 82
- Worcester Volunteer Fire Department, Station 83
- Skippack Fire Company, Station 86
- Upper Frederick Fire Company No. 1, Station 87
- Fort Washington Fire Company No. 1, Station 88
- Harleysville Fire Company, Station 89
- Enterprise Fire Company of Hatboro, Station 95
- Pioneer Fire Company of Jenkintown, Station 96
- Royersford Fire Department, Station 98
- Abington Township Fire Department
  - Abington Fire Company, Station 100
  - McKinley Fire Company, Station 200
  - Weldon Fire Company, Station 300
  - Edge Hill Fire Company No. 1, Station 400
  - Roslyn Fire Company, Station 500
- Oreland Volunteer Fire Company No. 1, Station 700

== Northumberland County ==
- Mount Carmel Fire Department
  - American Hose & Chemical Fire Company No. 1, Station 1
  - Anthracite Steam Fire Company, Station 2
  - Clover Hose Company, Station 3
  - Mount Carmel Area Rescue Squad, Station 5
- Shamokin Fire Bureau
  - Friendship Fire and Hose Company No. 1, Station 10
  - Rescue Fire Company, Station 30
  - Independence Fire Company, Station 40
  - Shamokin Emergency Squad, Station 60
- Mount Carmel Township Fire Department
  - Atlas Fire Company, Station 21
  - Beaverdale Fire Company, Station 22
  - Locust Gap Fire Company, Station 23
  - Natalie Fire Company, Station 24
  - Strong Fire Company, Station 25
- Sunbury Fire Department
  - Sunbury Steam Fire Engine Company, Station 52
  - Rescue Hose Company, Station 53
  - Americus Hose Company, Station 54
  - East Sunbury Hose Company No. 1, Station 56
  - Goodwill Hose Company, Station 57
- Lower Mahanoy Fire Company, Station 62
- Herndon Fire Company, Station 63
- Hickory Corners & Community Fire Company, Station 64
- Marion Heights Fire Company, Station 70
- Upper Augusta Fire Company, Station 72
- Northumberland Fire Department, Station 73
- Point Township Fire Department
  - Point Township Fire Company, Station 74
  - Tuckahoe Fire Company, Station 74-1
- Coal Township Fire Department
  - Maine Fire Company No. 1, Station 110
  - East End Fire Company, Station 120
  - Union Fire Company, Station 130
  - Brady Fire Company, Station 150
  - Forest Hill Fire Company, Station 160
  - Coal Township Rescue Squad, Station 190
- Elysburg Fire Department, Station 170
- Kulpmont Fire Department, Station 200
- Ralpho Fire Company, Station 290
- Trevorton Fire Company No. 1, Station 300
- East Cameron Township Fire Company, Station 350
- Stonington Volunteer Fire Company, Station 6-3
- Lower Augusta Volunteer Fire, Station 7-1
- Southside Fire Company, Station 70 (Dispatched by Montour County)
- Warrior Run Fire Department, Station 9 (Dispatched by Union County)
- Potts Grove Fire Company, Station 12 (Dispatched by Union County)
- Milton Fire Department, Station 15 (Dispatched by Union County)
- Turbot Township Fire Company, Station 17 (Dispatched by Union County)

== Philadelphia County ==
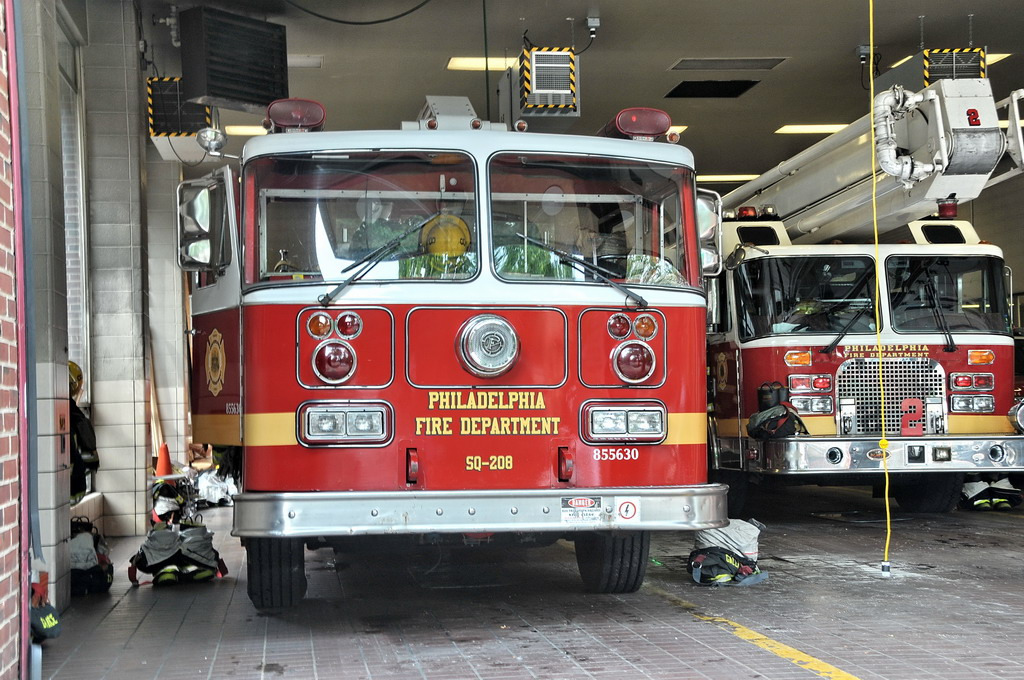
Philadelphia Fire Department fire engines

- Philadelphia Fire Department

== Sullivan County ==
- Dushore VFC, Station 57
- Eagles Mere VFC, Station 51
- Endless Winds VFC, Station 55
- Eldredsville VFC, Station 56
- Forksville VFD, Station 53
- Hillsgrove VFC, Station 54
- Laporte VFC, Station 50
- Mildred VFC, Station 58
- Muncy Valley Area VFC, Station 52

== Venango County ==
- Cherrytree VFD, Station 2
- Clintonville VFD, Station 3
- Cooperstown VFD, Station 5
- Cornplanter VFD, Station 6
- Emlenton VFD, Station 55
- Franklin VFD, Station 9
- Kennerdell VFD, Station 30
- Oakland VFD, Station 13
- Oil City Fire Department, Station 14
- Pinegrove VFD, Station 15
- Pleasantville VFD, Station 16
- Polk Fire Rescue, Station 17
- President VFD, Station 18
- Reno VFD, Station 19
- Rockland VFD, Station 20
- Rocky Grove VFD, Station 21
- Rouseville VFD, Station 22
- Sandycreek Township VFD, Station 23
- Seneca VFD, Station 24
- Utica VFD, Station 27

== Washington County ==
- Amwell Township VFD, Station 34
- Avella Township VFD, Station 35
- Bentleyville VFD, Station 11
- Burgettstown VFC, Station 21
- California VFD, Station 23
- Canton Township Fire & Rescue, Station 52
- Canonsburg VFD, Station 69
- Carroll Township VFD, Station 63
- Cecil Township
  - Lawrence VFC #1, Station 28
  - Muse VFC #2, Station 29
  - Cecil Township VFC #3, Station 10
- Charleroi Fire Department, Station 33
- Chartiers VFD, Station 25
- Claysville VFD, Station 31
- Cokeburg VFD, Station 68
- Denbo-Vista #6 VFD #6, Station 19
- Donora VFD, Station 66
- East Bethlehem VFC, Station 15
- Eldersville VFD, Station 49
- Ellsworth-Somerset VFD, Station 38
- Elrama VFC, Station 24
- Fallowfield VFD, Station 47
- Finleyville VFD, Station 26
- Hanover VFD, Station 45
- Houston VFD, Station 65
- Jefferson VFD, Station 49
- Lock #4 VFC (North Charleroi), Station 22
- Lone Pine VFD, Station 50
- Marianna VFC, Station 67
- McDonald VFD, Station 12
- Meadowlands VFD, Station 25
- Midway VFD, Station 13
- Monongahela VFD, Station 62
- Morris Township VFD, Station 42
- Mt. Pleasant VFC, Station 41
- New Eagle VFD, Station 14
- North Franklin VFC, Station 43
- North Strabane Fire Rescue, Station 48
- Peters Township VFD, Station 64
- Richeyville VFD, Station 27
- Roscoe VFD, Station 16
- Slovan-Smith Township VFD, Station 18
- South Franklin VFD, Station 52
- South Strabane VFD, Station 44
- Stockdale VFD, Station 17
- Washington City Fire Department, Station 54
- Washington County HazMat, Station 92
- Taylorstown VFD, Station 36
- West Alexander VFD, Station 39
- West Brownsville VFD, Station 61
- West Finley VFD, Station 53
- West Middletown VFD, Station 30
- Valley Inn VFD, Station 46

== Westmoreland County ==
- Alcoa Technical Center FD, Station 122
- Allegheny Township
  - Allegheny Township VFC #1, Station 99
  - Markle VFD, Station 101
- Arnold VFD, Station 95
- Avonmore VFD, Station 55
- Bell Township VFD, Station 67
- Chestnut Ridge VFD
- Delmont VFD, Station 30
- Derry Boro VFC, Station 41
- Derry Township
  - Bradenville VFD, Station 71
- East Huntingdon Township VFD, Station 74
- Everson VFD, Station 60
- Fairfield Twp VFD, Station 111
- Grandview VFD, Station 106
- Greensburg VFD, Station 79
  - Hose Co #1, Station 79-1
  - Truck/Foam Co #2, Station 79-2
  - Hose Co #3, Station 79-3
  - Hose Co #6, Station 79-6
  - Hose Co #7, Station 79-7
  - Hose Co #8, Station 79-8
- Hempfield Township
  - Adamsburg VFD, Staton 10
  - Bovard VFD, Station 84
  - Carbon VFD, Station 23
  - Fort Allen VFD, Station 104
  - Grapeville VFD, Station 21
  - Hannastown VFD, Station 75
  - Hempfield VFD #2, Station 29
  - High Park VFD, Station 61
  - Luxor VFD, Station 93
  - Midway-St Clair VFD, Station 28
  - North Hempfield VFD, Station 65
  - West Point VFD, Station 96
- Hunker VFD, Station 27
- Hyde Park, Station 53
- Irwin VFD, Station 57
- Jeannette FD, Station 112
- Latrobe
  - Goodwill Hose Co #1, Station 113-1
  - Hook & Ladder Co #2, Station 113-2
  - Freewill Hose Co #3, Station 113-3
  - Good Friends Hose Co #5, Station 113-5
  - Free Service Fire Unit #6, Station 113-6
- Ligonier
  - Darlington VFD, Station 42
  - Ligonier Volunteer Hose Co #1, Station 43
  - Waterford VFD #1, Station 44
  - Wilpen VFD #2, Station 45
- Lower Burrell
  - Kinloch VFC #1, Station 54
  - Lower Burrell VFC #3, Station 69
- Madison VFD, Station 18
- Manor VFD, Station 13
- Monessen Bureau of Fire
  - Monessen #1, Station 81-1
  - Monessen Hilltop #2, Station 81-2
- Mt Pleasant Boro VFD, Station 38
- Mt Pleasant Township
  - Calumet VFD, Station 109
  - Hecla VFD, Station 88
  - Kecksburg VFD, Station 76
  - Norvelt VFD, Station 37
  - Trauger VFD, Station 35
- Murrysville
  - Export VFD, Station 22
  - Murrysville VFC #1, Station 20
  - Sardis VFD, Station 78
  - White Valley VFD, Station 64
- New Florence VFD, Station 46
- New Alexandria VFD, Station 77
- New Kensington Bureau of Fire, Station 56
  - New Kensington #1, Station 56-1
  - New Kensington #2, Station 56-2
  - New Kensington #3, Station 56-3
  - New Kensington #4, Station 56-4
  - New Kensington #5, Station 56-5
- New Stanton VFD, Station 25
- North Belle Vernon VFD, Station 80
- North Huntingdon
  - Circleville VFD, Station 8
  - Fairmont-Hahntown VFD, Station 6
  - Hartford Heights VFD, Station 4
  - Larimer VFD, Station 1
  - North Huntingdon Rescue Truck, Station 214
  - Shafton VFD, Station 5
  - Strawpump VFD, Station 2
  - Westmoreland City VFD, Station 3
- North Irwin VFD, Station 12
- Oklahoma VFD, Station 49
- Penn Borough VFD, Station 94
- Penn Township
  - Claridge VFD, Station 63
  - Grandview VFD, Station 106
  - Harrison City VFD, Station 87
  - Level Green VFD, Station 9
  - Paintertown VFD, Station 7
- Rostraver Township
  - Collinsburg VFC, Station 103
  - Rostraver Central VFC, Station 105
  - Webster VFD #1, Station 31
- Salem Township
  - Slickville VFD, Station 59
  - Forbes Road VFC #2, Station 90
- Scottdale VFD, Station 58
- Seward VFD, Station 47
- Sewickley Township
  - Herminie VFD, Station 15
  - Hutchinson VFD, Station 85
  - Lowber VFC, Station 16
  - Rillton VFD, Station 14
- Smithton VFD, Station 17
- South Greensburg FD, Station 32
- South Huntingdon Township
  - Turkeytown VFD, Station 107
  - Yukon VFD, Station 19
- Southwest Greensburg VFD, Station 24
- Sutersville VFD, Station 11
- Trafford VFD, Station 86
- Unity Township
  - Crabtree VFD, Station 34
  - Dry Ridge VFD, Station 91
  - Lloydsville VFD, Station 114
  - Marguerite VFD, Station 33
  - Mutual VFD, Station 83
  - St Vincent College VFD, Station 117
  - Pleasant Unity VFD, Station 36
  - Whitney Hostetter VFD, Station 73
  - Youngstown VFD, Station 39
- Upper Burrell Twp FD, Station 115
- Vandergrift
  - Vandergrift VFD #1, Station 51
  - Vandergrift VFD #2, Station 50
- Washington Township VFC #1, Station 102
- West Leechburg VFD, Station 52
- Westinghouse Waltz Mills FD, Station 116
- Westmoreland County
  - Airport Authority, Station 121
  - HAZMAT Team, Station 800
  - Rough Terrain Team, Station 211
  - Tactical Rope Team, Station 143
  - Trench Rescue Team, Station 148
  - Water Rescue Team, Station 175
- West Newton VFC, Station 82
- Youngwood Hose Co #1, Station 26

== See also ==
- List of fire departments#United States
- List of Pennsylvania state agencies
