= Urban Search and Rescue Pennsylvania Task Force 1 =

Urban Search and Rescue Pennsylvania Task Force or PA-TF1 is a FEMA Urban Search and Rescue Task Force based in the Commonwealth of Pennsylvania.

== Participating agencies ==
Pennsylvania Task Force One, PA-TF-1, serves as one of FEMA’s 28 Urban Search and Rescue Teams. The sponsoring agency for Pennsylvania Task Force 1 Urban Search and Rescue is the Philadelphia Fire Department, through a Quad Party Memorandum of Agreement between the City of Philadelphia, DHS/FEMA Washington, D.C., FEMA Region III and the Pennsylvania Emergency Management Agency. The 200-plus member team includes many agencies, with personnel primarily being from the Philadelphia Fire Department, the Harrisburg Bureau of Fire, and the Baltimore County Fire Department.

== Capabilities ==
The Task Force operates from a 27,000 sq ft (2,500 m^{2}) Special Operations Center located in Philadelphia, Pennsylvania. All management and support functions such as training, logistics and maintenance are conducted from this facility. The Task Force maintains a FTE staff of a program manager, financial manager, training manager and logistics manager. The Special Operations Center and administration and management organizational structure support both the federally deployable PA-TF1, as well as the in-state US&R response system.

== Deployments ==
PA-TF-1 has been deployed to numerous incidents of national significance. The Task Force's first federal deployment was to North Carolina in 1999 for Hurricane Floyd. During this deployment, PA-TF1 gained distinction for several swift water rescues. PA-TF1 was deployed to the 2001 World Trade Center Attacks, the 2005 Hurricane Katrina/Rita event, and the 2008 Hurricane Ike/Gustav storm. PA-TF1 has also been deployed for National Special Security Events. Members from PA-TF1 also participate on the management teams established through FEMA to support the US&R system. These teams, referred to as Incident Support Teams (IST), provide the overhead coordination and support when there are multiple Task Forces operating within the same theatre of operations. Since the inception of the National US&R Response System, these personnel have responded to the majority of federally declared disasters where ESF-9 was activated for US&R.

== Pennsylvania US&R Response System ==
In 2002, then Pennsylvania Governor Mark Schweiker proposed the formation of an in-state US&R Response System. This was a result of recommendations from the post 9-11 Governor's Task Force on Homeland Security. On September 11, 2001, Pennsylvania Task Force One, PA-TF-1, was immediately deployed to New York City. Subsequently, a terrorist aircraft possibly bound for Washington DC crashed in Shanksville, PA. Concerned that the aircraft could have crashed into one of many cities such as Johnstown, Harrisburg, or York, while en route to its intended target, the Governor's Task Force recommended creation of a US&R capability dedicated for in-state use. This search and rescue team was envisioned to perform the same search and rescue capabilities as a FEMA Type I US&R Task Force, but only be deployable to the Commonwealth of Pennsylvania. There was also a desire to reduce the activation and deployment time for the in-state team, and a decentralized system was developed. Today, there are seven (7) regional US&R elements within Pennsylvania. These elements can be activated at either the local level, or at the state level, and are primarily operational in nature. Large scale incident management and support to the regional elements is provided through the headquarters element. The Pennsylvania US&R Response System is managed solely by the Pennsylvania Emergency Management Agency. Since its inception, this system has been activated for many localized collapse events, as well as several natural disasters within the state, such as the 2006 northeast PA floods. It has also been activated for security events such as the Gubernatorial Inauguration and prominent sporting events.
