= Philadelphia Fire Department =

Municipal agency in Pennsylvania, US

Coordinates: 39.961°N 75.142°W

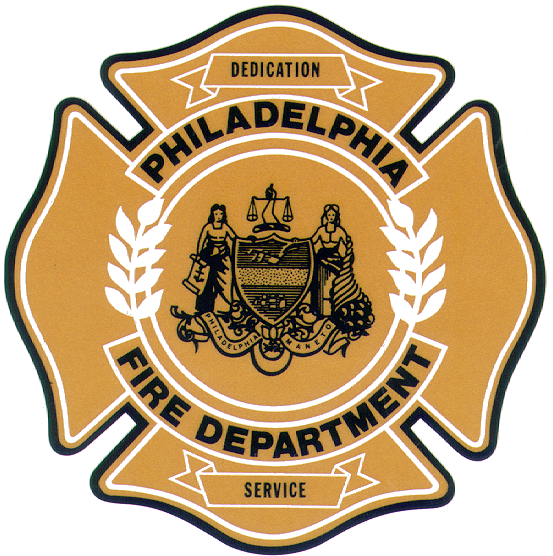

Operational area
- Country: United States
- State: Pennsylvania
- City: Philadelphia

Agency overview
- Established: March 15, 1871
- Annual calls: 437,329 (2013)
- Employees: 2700
- Staffing: Career
- Commissioner: Jeffrey Thompson, Commissioner
- Mayor of Philadelphia: Cherelle Parker
- Managing Director: Adam Thiel
- EMS level: ALS & BLS
- IAFF: 22
- Motto: Motto: Dedication and Service

Facilities and equipment
- Divisions: 3 Divisions
- Battalions: 13 Battalions
- Stations: 63 Fire Stations
- Engines: 60 Engine Companies
- Trucks: 24 Truck Companies
- Platforms: 5 Tower Ladder Trucks
- Squads: 2 Squad Companies
- Rescues: 1 Heavy Rescue Unit
- Ambulances: 60 Ambulance Units
- HAZMAT: 2 Hazardous Materials Units
- USAR: 1 Urban Search And Rescue Unit
- Airport crash: 10 Crash Trucks
- Wildland: 2 Wildfire Engines
- Fireboats: 3 Fireboats

Website
- Official website
- IAFF website

The Philadelphia Fire Department (PFD) provides fire protection and emergency medical services (EMS) to the city of Philadelphia. The PFD's official mission is to protect public safety by quick and professional response to emergencies and through the promotion of sound emergency prevention measures. This mandate encompasses all traditional firefighting functions, including fire suppression, with 58 Engine companies and 29 Ladder companies as well as specialty and support units deployed throughout the city; specialized firefighting units for Philadelphia International Airport and the Port of Philadelphia; investigations conducted by the Fire Marshal's Office to determine the origins of fires and to develop preventive strategies; prevention programs to educate the public in order to increase overall fire safety; and support services such as: research and planning, management of the Fire Communications Center within the City's 911 system, and operation of the Fire Academy.

The delivery of emergency medical services now generates more than seventy percent of the department's total calls for services. Furthermore, the department's Regional Emergency Medical Services Office is responsible for regulating all public and private ambulance services within the city. Lastly, the department enforces all state and federal hazardous materials (HAZMAT) regulations within the city, and coordinates the response to such incidents. The IAFF local is 22.

The PFD is the largest fire department in the Commonwealth of Pennsylvania and also has the busiest Emergency Medical Services division in the United States with a single ambulance, Medic 2, responding to 8,788 calls in 2013 and Medic 8 responded to 9,011 calls in 2018.

== History ==
=== Formation of the Philadelphia Fire Department ===
One of the oldest established fire departments in the United States, the PFD traces its origins back to early volunteer companies, specifically the Union Fire Company, established on December 7, 1736, led by Benjamin Franklin.

Ordinances of 1840, 1855, and 1856 established a City Fire Department which was a voluntary association of independent fire companies which, in return for subsidies, accepted the direction of City Councils.

An ordinance of 29 December 1870, established Philadelphia's first fully paid and municipally controlled fire department, administered by seven commissioners chosen by Councils. The PFD officially entered into service on 15 March 1871. In 1887 the commissioners were abolished and the department placed under the control of the Department of Public Safety as the Bureau of Fire in compliance with the 1885 Bullitt Bill and enabling ordinance of 1886. The fire marshal, first appointed on 1864, was a member of the Bureau of Police until 1937 when his office was removed from it and placed directly under the Director of the Department of Public Safety. In 1950 it was transferred to the Bureau of Fire.

In 1886, the department hired its first Black firefighter, who served with Engine Company 11. In 1919, Engine Company 11 was designated the department's all-Black unit. Later Fire Boat One was also an all-Black unit. The Department began to desegregate in February 1949.

The City Charter of 1951 abolished the Department of Public Safety and established the present Fire Department. At that time its inspection duties were transferred to the Department of Licenses and Inspections. Investigation of the origin and cause of fires remains with the PFD fire marshal's office.

Today, there still remains one volunteer fire company, the Philadelphia Second Alarmers, which provides rehabilitation and refreshment support.

=== High-Pressure Fire System ===
As the 1800s came to an end, Philadelphia's regular water supply system had become unable to supply the needed water to fight fires in the increasingly larger and higher buildings of the central business district. After the Insurance Companies raised premiums and eventually refused to write new policies in the Downtown section of Philadelphia the City finally commissioned the installation of the High-Pressure Fire System in 1901. This would be the worlds first major city high-pressure water service dedicated for firefighting. The system was designed to encompass the area of Delaware River to Broad Street and Race Street to Walnut Streets. The system would be supplied from a pumping station located at Race Street and Delaware Ave utilizing a total of seven 280HP natural gas powered fire pumps. The total cost of the proposed system at the time was estimated between $625,975 and $702,539. Once completed in November 1903 the system encompassed a total of 26 miles of pipe supplying 434 hydrants. The system maintained a pressure of 70psi and could be increased to over 200psi upon demand.

The system proved to be so successful that in approximately 1909 the city expanded the system to cover the Textile Mill District which was located in the North Philadelphia, Port Richmond, and Kensington neighborhoods. This expansion also included a reservoir located at 6th & Leigh Avenue fed by a large service main under Broad Street. Additional expansions were made to the original system to cover the area from the Schuylkill and Delaware Rivers from Girard Avenue to South Street. The expansions grew the original 26 miles network of pipes to 56 and also included more pumping stations. The High-Pressure Fire System was officially decommissioned in 2005 after falling into years of disrepair.

== Chief Engineers/Fire Commissioners ==
Chief Engineers

- William H. Johnson: 1871–1879
- John R. Cantlin: 1879–1892
- James C. Baxter: 1892–1911
- Edward A. Waters: 1911–1913
- Samuel A. Cook (acting): 1913
- John J. Meskill (acting): 1913–1914
- William H. Murphy: 1914–1920
- Ross B. Davis: 1920–1937
- Charles A. Gill (acting): 1937–1939
- Ross B. Davis: 1939–1941
- George Ferrier (acting): 1941
- William F. Cowden: 1941–1947
- John C. Cost: 1947–1952

Fire Commissioners

- Frank L. McNamee: 1952–1964
- George E. Hink: 1964–1965
- James J. McCarey: 1965–1972
- Joseph R. Rizzo: 1972–1984
- William C. Richmond: 1984–1988
- Roger L. Ulshafer: 1988–1992
- Harold B. Hairston: 1992–2004
- Lloyd Ayers: 2004–2014
- Derrick L. Sawyer: 2014–2016
- Adam K. Thiel: 2016–2024
- Craig Murphy (acting): 2024
- Jeffrey W. Thompson: 2024–present

== USAR Task Force 1 ==
The Philadelphia Fire Department is the sponsoring agency for Urban Search and Rescue Pennsylvania Task Force 1 (PA-TF1), one of twenty-eight FEMA Urban Search and Rescue Task Forces in the nation and the only one in Pennsylvania.

== Operations ==
=== Fire station locations and apparatus ===
Below is a complete listing of all fire station and equipment locations in the city of Philadelphia along with their Division and Battalion. There are three divisions and 13 battalions in the department. Division 1 consists of 5 battalions and 23 fire stations while Division 2 has 4 battalions and 17 fire stations and Division 3 has 4 battalions and 21 fire stations. In November 2019, the Department announced plans to staff and reinstate four previously disbanded Engine Companies. Engine 1 in Center City, Engine 8 in Olde City, Engine 14 in Frankford and Engine 39 in Roxborough were restored on 23 November 2019. Ladder 1 in Fairmount/Francisville was restored on 11 December 2023, upon receipt of $22 million FEMA grant. Ladder 11 was restored on 6 April 2024, and Engine 6 was restored in December 2024, utilizing the same grant. There are over 60 medic units spread across the department, including advanced life support (ALS) and basic life support (BLS) units. For special events, or to meet staffing requirements, the advanced life support (ALS) medic units may be downgraded to basic life support (BLS) units. A BLS unit will contain a 'B' in their call sign, for example Medic 11B. Sometime Medic units run with an EMT or Firefighter/EMT, and an EMT-A, making the call sign 'I', for example Medic 37I.

==== Division 1 ====
Battalion	Neighborhood	Engine Company	Ladder Company	EMS Units	Chief Units	Additional Units	Address
1	Hawthorne	Engine 1	Ladder 5	Medic Unit 35	Assistant Chief Unit 1		711 South Broad Street
4	Queen Village	Engine 3		Medic Unit 27		EVAC 1	200 Washington Avenue
1	Passyunk Square	Engine 10	Ladder 11		Battalion Chief Unit 1		1357 South 12th Street
1	Point Breeze	Engine 24		Medic Unit 14			1200 South 20th Street
1	Wharton	Engine 53	Ladder 27	Medic Unit 43			414 Snyder Avenue
1	Melrose	Engine 60	Ladder 19	Medic Unit 37		Haz-Mat 1 Haz-Mat 2 Chemical 1 Haz-Mat Administrative Unit 1 Haz-Mat Administrative Unit 2 Haz-Mat Administrative Unit 3 Haz-Mat Administrative Unit 4 Haz-Mat Administrative Unit 5	2301 South 24th Street
4	Olde City	Squrt 8	Tower Ladder 2	Medic Unit 44; Medic Unit 63B	Battalion Chief Unit 4		101 North 4th Street
4	Society Hill	Engine 11		Medic Unit 21			601 South Street
4	Chinatown	Engine 20	Ladder 23	Medic Unit 1			133 North 10th Street
4	Center City	Engine 43	Ladder 9	Medic Unit 7 ES Unit 1			2108 Market Street
6	Elmwood	Engine 40	Ladder 4	Medic Unit 19			6438 Woodland Avenue
6	Grays Ferry	Squad 47		Medic Unit 40; Medic Unit 53B	Deputy Chief 1	Squad 47A	3023 Grays Ferry Avenue
6	Lower Moyamensing	Engine 49		Medic Unit 11; ES Unit 8			2600 South 13th Street
6	Eastwick	Water Tower 69		Medic 55B; ES 12	Battalion Chief 6	Grass Firefighter Unit 1 CAT Unit 2	8138 Bartram Ave
7	Carroll Park	Engine 41	Ladder 24	Medic 23			1201 North 61st Street
7	Overbrook Park	Engine 54		Medic 41			1913 North 63rd Street
7	West Philadelphia	Engine 57		Medic 9			5559 Chestnut Street
7	Cedar Park	Engine 68	Tower Ladder 13	Medic 3	Battalion Chief 7		801 South 52nd Street
7	Philadelphia; International Airport	Engine 78 (Foxtrot 10)		Medic 30; Alternative Response 30		Foxtrot 1 Foxtrot 2 Foxtrot 3 Foxtrot 4 Foxtrot 5 Foxtrot 6 Foxtrot 7 Foxtrot 8 Foxtrot 9 Foxtrot 11; Foxtrot 21; Foxtrot 22; Foxtrot 23; Foxtrot 24	8800 Hog Island Road
11	Spruce Hill	Engine 5	Ladder 6		Battalion Chief 11		4221 Market Street
11	East Parkside	Foam 16		Medic 26; Medic 59		Mass Casualty Unit 1	1517 Belmont Avenue
11	Brewerytown	Engine 34		Medic 36		Air Unit 1	1301 North 28th Street
11	Mantua	Engine 44		Medic 34			3420 Haverford Avenue

==== Division 2 ====
Battalion	Neighborhood	Engine Company	Ladder Company	EMS Units	Chief Units	Additional Units	Address
5	Millbrook	Engine 22	Ladder 31	Medic 20			3270 Comly Road
5	Fox Chase	Engine 56		Medic 48			832 Rhawn Street
5	Somerton	Engine 58		Medic 54B	Battalion Chief 5		812 Hendrix Street
5	Bustleton	Engine 62	Ladder 34	Medic 6			9845 Bustleton Avenue
10	Harrowgate	Engine 7	Ladder 10	Medic 2 Medic 57	Battalion Chief 10		3798 Kensington Avenue
10	Kensington	Engine 25		Medic 8 Medic 58	Nuisance Fire Task Force 7 (Temporarily)		2931 Boudinot Street
10	Port Richmond	Engine 28		Medic 45		Mass Decon 1	2520 East Ontario Street
10	Bridesburg	Foam 33				Foam Tender 1	4750 Richmond Street
10	Fishtown	Engine 6	Ladder 16	Medic 46			2601 Belgrade Street
12	Frankford	Engine 14	Ladder 15				1652 Foulkrod Street
12	Wissinoming	Engine 52		Medic 32			4501 Van Kirk Street
12	Lawndale	Engine 64					6100 Rising Sun Avenue
12	Lawncrest	Squrt 70		Medic 42	Deputy Chief 2		4800 Langdon Street
12	Northeast Philadelphia	Engine 71	Tower Ladder 28	Medic 12	Battalion Chief 12		1900 Cottman Avenue
13	Rhawnhurst	Engine 18		Medic 38			8205 Roosevelt Boulevard
13	Holmesburg	Engine 36	Ladder 20	Medic 17			7818 Frankford Avenue
13	Tacony	Water Tower 38		Medic 47; ES 3 ES 11		Mass Casualty Unit 2	4931 Magee Avenue
13	Torresdale	Foam 46		Medic 49	Battalion Chief 13	Grass Firefighter 3	9197 Frankford Avenue

==== Division 3 ====
Battalion	Neighborhood	Engine Company	Ladder Company	EMS Units	Chief Units	Additional Units	Address
2	Logan / Ogontz	Engine 51	Ladder 29	Medic 18	Battalion Chief 2		5931 Old York Road
2	Olney	Engine 61		Medic 29			5334 Rising Sun Avenue
2	East Oak Lane	Engine 63		Medic 56B			1210 Oak Lane Avenue
2	Wyoming	Squad 72		Medic 24 Medic 62B; ES 10		Squad 72A	1127 West Louden Street
2	West Oak Lane	Engine 73		Medic 33		Air Unit 2	7515 Ogontz Avenue
3	Fairmount / Francisville	Engine 13	Ladder 1	Medic 50			1541 Parrish Street
3	Cecil B. Moore	Engine 27		Medic 13	Battalion Chief 3		1901 West Oxford Street
3	Olde Kensington	Engine 29		Medic 15		Rescue 1 Rescue 1A; Collapse Unit 1	400 West Girard Avenue
3	Strawberry Mansion	Engine 45	Ladder 14	Medic 25			2401 North 26th Street
8	West Kensington	Engine 2	Ladder 3	Medic 31; Medic 51; ES 9			2426 North 2nd Street
8	East Falls	Squrt 35	Ladder 25	Medic 16			4208 Ridge Avenue
8	Glenwood	Engine 50	Ladder 12	Medic 22	IS 1 Incident Safety Officer		1325 West Cambria Street
8	Franklinville	Engine 55	Tower Ladder 22	Medic 39			4000 North Front Street
8	Nicetown	Engine 59	Ladder 18	Medic 4	Battalion Chief 8		2207 West Hunting Park Avenue
9	Mount Airy	Squrt 9	Ladder 21	Medic 10			6900 Germantown Avenue
9	Manayunk	Engine 12			Battalion Chief 9		4447 Main Street
9	East Germantown	Engine 19	Tower Ladder 8	Medic 28	Deputy Chief 3		300 East Chelten Avenue
9	Chestnut Hill	Engine 37		Medic 61B			101 West Highland Avenue
9	Roxborough	Engine 39	Ladder 30	Medic 5			6630 Ridge Avenue
9	Roxborough	Engine 66		Medic 52B			7720 Ridge Avenue

==== Marine Division ====
Neighborhood	Marine Company	Address
Delaware River	Marine Unit 1	1 Washington Avenue
Schuylkill River	Marine Unit 2 Marine Unit 4	Passyunk Avenue & Schuylkill Avenue

==== Disbanded, never organized or restored fire companies ====
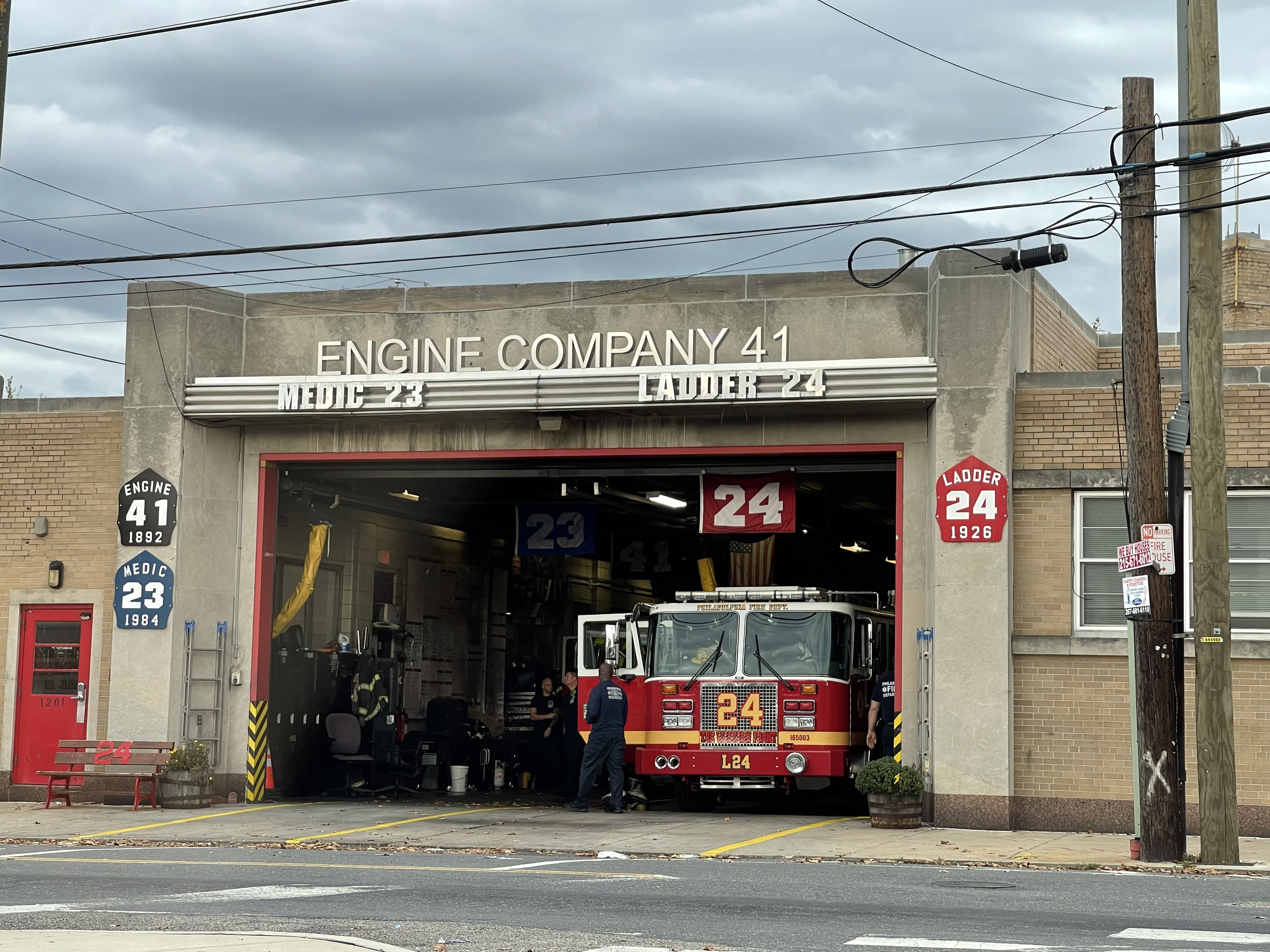
Engine 41 on 61st Street

* Engine 1 - 711 S. Broad St.  Restored 23 November 2019
* Engine 4 - 1528 Sansom St.
* Engine 6 - 2601 Belgrade St. Restored 9 January 2025
* Engine 8 - 101 N. 4th St.    Restored 23 November 2019
* Engine 14 - 1652 Foulkrod St. Restored 23 November 2019
* Engine 15 - 1625 N. Howard St. - Disbanded to form Marine Unit 15
* Engine 17 - 1328 Race St.
* Engine 21 - 609 N. 2nd St.
* Engine 23 - 2736 N. 6th St. - Disbanded to form Marine Unit 23
* Engine 26 - 1010 Buttonwood St.
* Engine 30 - 3548 Germantown Ave.
* Engine 31 - 2736 6th St.
* Engine 32 - 239 S. 6th St. - Disbanded to form Marine Unit 32
* Engine 39 - 6630 Ridge Ave.  Restored 23 November 2019
* Engine 42 - 3320 N. Front St.
* Engine 48 - 930 S. 7th St.
* Engine 65 - 5331 Haverford Ave.
* Engine 67 - Haverford Ave. & N. Preston St.
* Engine 74 - Never Organized
* Engine 75 - Never Organized
* Engine 76 - Philadelphia Northeast Airport
* Engine 77 - Philadelphia International Airport - Merged with Engine 78
* Ladder 1 - 1541 Parrish St. Restored 11 December 2023
* Ladder 7 - 400 W. Girard Ave.
* Ladder 11 - 1357 S. 12th St. Restored 6 April 2024
* Ladder 17 - 1210 Oak Lane Ave.
* Ladder 26 - 8201 Tinicum Blvd.
* Ladder 32 - 3023 Grays Ferry Ave.
* Ladder 33 - Never Organized

== Gallery ==
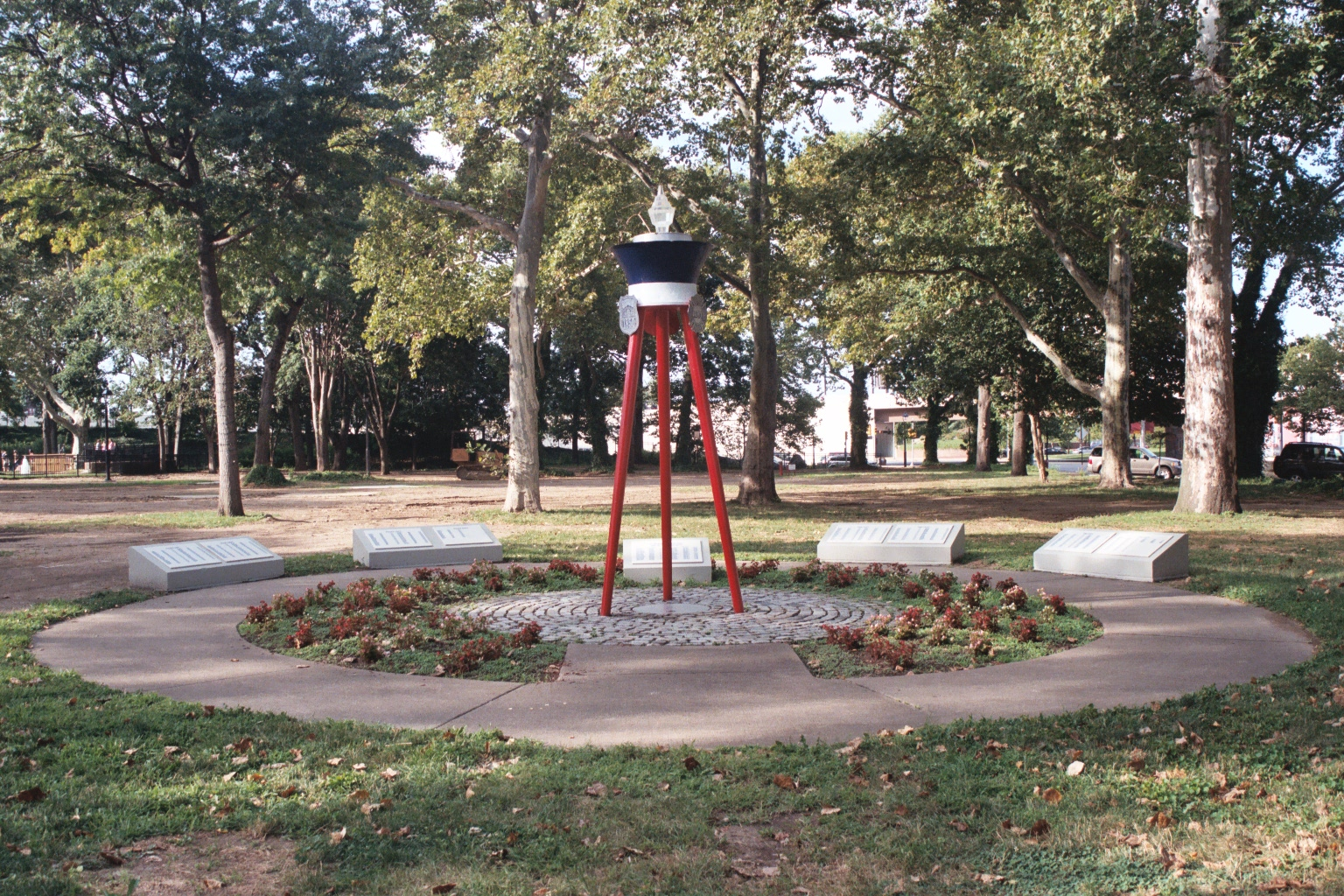
Philadelphia Fire Department Memorial

== See also ==
- Philadelphia Police Department
- City of Philadelphia
- List of Pennsylvania fire departments
