= Adrian King =

Adrian King may refer to:

- Adrian King (basketball) (born 1971), Australian wheelchair basketball player
- Adrian King (cricketer) (born 1952), West Indian cricketer
- Adrian R. King, American public official
