= Robert French (disambiguation) =

Robert French (born 1947) is an Australian judge.

Robert French may also refer to:

- Robert French (1716–1779), Irish politician
- Robert French (English MP), English MP for Totnes
- Robert P. French, American politician from Pennsylvania
- Robert M. French (active since 1972), American cognitive scientist and research director at the CNRS, France
- Robert French (Irish judge) (1690–1772), Irish judge
- Robert French (sailor) (1918–2006), Australian Olympic sailor
- Robert French (photographer) (1841–1917), Irish photographer

== See also ==
- Robert Ffrench (born c. 1962), Jamaican reggae singer and record producer
- Bob French
