= James R. Joseph =

American politician

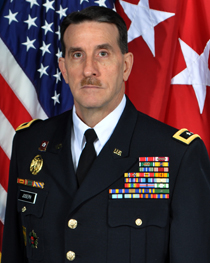
- James R. Joseph

Pennsylvania Adjutant General of Military and Veterans Affairs
- In office 2015 – March 11, 2016

James R. Joseph is the former Pennsylvania Adjutant General of Military and Veterans Affairs, appointed by Governor Tom Wolf in 2015 and confirmed in May 2015. Previously, he served as Director of the Pennsylvania Emergency Management Agency, having been appointed in January 2005.

== Career ==
James Joseph's nomination for promotion to brigadier general was received by the Senate on July 29, 2005 and approved on September 30. His nomination for promotion to major general was received by the Senate along with 32 others on November 17, 2010 and approved on December 22.

Joseph served in the cabinet of Governor Ed Rendell as Director of the Pennsylvania Emergency Management Agency. In 2015, following the election of Democratic Governor Tom Wolf, Joseph was nominated to serve as Adjutant General of Military and Veterans Affairs of Pennsylvania. He was subsequently confirmed by the Pennsylvania State Senate in May 2015.

Joseph took a paid leave of absence in January 2016 and then resigned on March 11, 2016.
