= Bob French =

Bob French may refer to:

- Bob French (jazz musician) (1937–2012), American jazz drummer and radio show host
- Bob French (bluegrass musician)
- Bob French (politician) (1944–2002), businessman and politician in Newfoundland and Labrador

== See also ==
- Robert French (disambiguation)
