= Pennsylvania Emergency Management Agency =

Pennsylvania Emergency Management Agency (PEMA)

Agency overview
- Jurisdiction: Commonwealth of Pennsylvania
- Headquarters: Harrisburg, Pennsylvania
- Agency executive: Randy Padfield, Acting Director
- Website: http://www.pema.pa.gov/

Pennsylvania Emergency Management Agency, also known as PEMA, is an independent cabinet-level agency in Pennsylvania tasked with the response to, preparedness for, recovery from, and the mitigation or prevention of disasters (natural and otherwise) and other emergencies.

== Agency directors ==
- David Sanko (2003–2004)
- Adrian R. King (2005)
- James R. Joseph (2005–2007)
- Robert P. French (2007–2011)

== See also ==
- List of Pennsylvania state agencies
- Federal Emergency Management Agency
