= Robert P. French =

American government official

Robert P. French was a Director of the Pennsylvania Emergency Management Agency from 2007 to 2011.
