= Adrian R. King =

American politician

Adrian King is a former First Deputy Attorney General of the State of Pennsylvania. Prior to his election, King had been the deputy chief of staff to Governor Ed Rendell and a former director of the Pennsylvania Emergency Management Agency. He was appointed in January 2005. He resigned in September 2005.
