= Scranton Fire Department =

Emergency services in Pennsylvania, United States

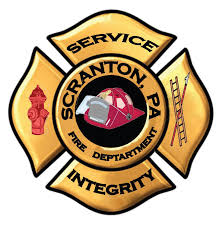
- SFD Logo

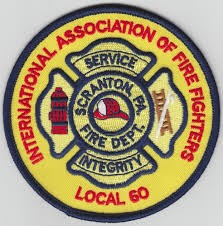
- SFD IAFF Local 60 Patch

Operational area
- Country: United States
- State: Pennsylvania
- County: Lackawanna
- Address: 518 Mulberry St, Scranton, Pa 18510 (Fire Headquarters)

Agency overview
- Established: May 4, 1901
- Annual calls: ≈3000
- Employees: Approximately 142 Firefighters and Fire Officers
- Staffing: Career
- Superintendent: John Judge IV
- IAFF: Local 60
- Motto: "Scranton's Bravest"

Facilities and equipment
- Divisions: 2
- Stations: 7 Operational, 2 Closed
- Engines: 5 Active, 5 Reserve
- Trucks: 2 Active, 2 Reserve
- Rescues: 1 Active, 1 Reserve
- HAZMAT: 1 Reserve
- USAR: PA Company 3
- Wildland: 2 Reserve
- Rescue boats: 3 Reserve
- Light and air: 1 Reserve

Website
- Official website
- Official IAFF

The Scranton Fire Department (also known as the City of Scranton Bureau of Fire, SFD, Scranton Fire, and Station 50) is an organization that provides fire protection, rescue services, hazardous materials mitigation, to the City of Scranton, Pennsylvania. The department used volunteer fire companies throughout its history and was established as a career fire department on May 4, 1901. The city maintained a combination of paid and volunteer firefighters from 1901 to 1907 when a full time department was established.

The Scranton Fire Department maintained an ambulance service from 1948 until 1988. Scranton firefighters are organized in a union under the International Association of Firefighters (IAFF). The city of Scranton currently maintains 7 fire stations, 5 engine companies, 2 truck companies, a rescue company, and a command/chief car.

== History ==
The city of Scranton utilized numerous volunteer fire companies from 1866 (The year Scranton incorporated as a city) onward until the local government formally enacted an ordinance authorizing a paid bureau of fire in 1901. On May 4, 1901, the City of Scranton Bureau of Fire was established. This, however, did not remove volunteers from the City's fire responses, as the department continued to utilize volunteers in a paid/volunteer combination system until 1907.

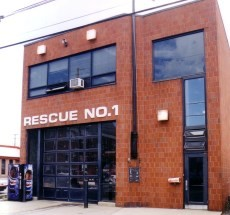
Rescue No.1's Quarters

During a Typhoid epidemic in 1906, the Health Bureau was concerned about noise from audible fire sirens used to alert volunteers would disturb patients. In response to this, the Bureau of Fire added 25 permanent firefighters to its roster bolstering its paid staff and lessening the need for these audible fire siren systems.

In 1911, the Bureau of Fire purchased its first motorized fire apparatus, a Chief's car. More apparatus would be motorized going forward until horse-drawn firefighting vehicles were phased out completely in 1923.

The Scranton Fire Department remains a full-time all career department today, with a total of about 142 professional firefighters and fire officers protecting the City of Scranton. Today, the Scranton Fire Department is the largest fire department in the Wyoming Valley and Northeastern Pennsylvania.

=== Ambulance service ===
The Scranton Fire Department began to maintain an ambulance service starting 1948. They were known as Car 20 (later known as Car 24) and Car 23. Two firefighters would staff the ambulance and respond to medical calls in the city. This would remain until 1988 when the ambulance service was discontinued.

=== Union representation ===
After years of going without a union, in 1918, Scranton firefighters organized under the International Association of Firefighters (IAFF), Local 60. The union lapsed its membership in the 1930s, again foregoing a union until 1940, when it rejoined under IAFF Local 669. This would remain until 2000 when the Union successfully won the right to use its original IAFF local union number. As of November 2010, Scranton Firefighters are represented by IAFF Local 60.

== Description ==
The Scranton Fire Department is an organization that provides fire protection, rescue services, hazardous materials mitigation, to the City of Scranton, Pennsylvania.

=== Stations and apparatus ===
The city of Scranton currently maintains 7 fire stations which house all fire apparatus, firefighters, and offices for the fire department. This amounts to having 5 engine companies, 2 truck companies, a rescue company, and a command/chief car providing protection to the city of Scranton on a daily basis. The department also keeps specialty vehicles in reserve for use on specific incident types. Additionally, the city of Scranton keeps 4 engines, one rescue, one HAZMAT and one truck company in reserve in case additional fire protection service is needed or to swap out apparatus while the front line apparatus are maintained and repaired.

Station Name	Address	Neighborhood	Engine Company	Truck(Ladder)Company	Rescue Company	Specialized Unit	Additional Functions
Fire Department Headquarters	518 Mulberry St, Scranton, PA 18510	Central City	Engine Company No. 4 Engine Company No. 11 (Reserve)	Truck Company No. 2		Assistant Chief Car 21 (Car 21)	Superintendent's Office Deputy Chief's Office Fire Investigation Office Fire Prevention Office
Rescue Co. 1	940 Wyoming Ave, Scranton PA 18509	Green Ridge			Rescue Company No.1	Haz-Mat Company No. 1	Self contained breathing apparatus (SCBA) repair and maintenance.
Engine Co. 2	500 Gibbons St, Scranton, PA 18505	South Side	Engine Company No. 2 Engine Company No. 1 (Reserve)				Fire hose repair and maintenance
Truck Co. 4	1047 N Main Ave, Scranton, PA 18508	North End	Engine Company No. 9 (Reserve)	Truck Company No. 4 Truck Company No.1 (Reserve)		Attack No. 1 (Brush)	
Engine Co. 7	1917 Luzerne St, Scranton, PA 18504	West Side	Engine Company No. 7 Engine Company No. 14 (Reserve)				Fire helmet repair and maintenance
Engine Co. 8	205 W Market St, Scranton, PA 18508	North End	Engine Company No. 8 Engine Company No. 15 (Reserve)			Car 30 (Air Cascade) Fire Prevention Trailer	
Engine Co. 10	1900 E Mountain Rd, Scranton, PA 18505	East Mountain	Engine Company No. 10				

==== Fire station response areas and conditions ====
- Fire Headquarters located at 518 Mulberry St, Scranton PA, 18510
  - Fire Headquarters houses Engine Company No. 4, Truck Company No. 2, and Assistant Chief Car 21 (The shift commander). This station's first due area is Central City, the Hill Section, Green Ridge and parts of South Side. In the event of a second alarm fire these companies will respond everywhere in the city. In addition to the three units housed here, this station houses the Fire Prevention and Investigation offices, the office of the Deputy Chief and the office of the Superintendent of Fire. Fire Headquarters was built in 1905 and is a protected historical landmark.
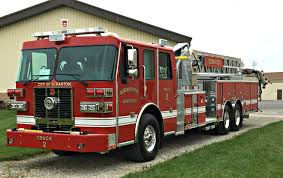
    SFD Truck Co. 2
- Rescue Company No. 1 located at 940 Wyoming Ave, Scranton, PA 18509
  - This station houses Rescue Company No. 1 and Car 30-A, the department's structural collapse truck. Rescue Company No. 1 is dispatched on all alarms in the city. In addition to fire suppression, Rescue Co. 1 responds to all motor vehicle accidents, industrial accidents, rescue calls, and all other tasks demanded of a modern Rescue Company. This station also maintains and repairs the department's self contained breathing apparatus (SCBA). Car 30-A is only dispatched when needed.
- Engine Company No. 2 located at 500 Gibbons St, Scranton, PA 18505
  - This station houses Engine Company No. 2 and Engine Company No. 1 (Reserve). Engine Co. 2's First due area covers Southside and Minooka. This company will respond to East Mountain, West Side, Central City, and the Hill Section in the event of a second alarm fire. Engine Co. 2 is designated as one of Lackawanna County's Decontamination units. This station is also where the department's hose is repaired. Engine Company No. 1 is only dispatched when additional staffing is needed or when acting as a replacement for another company.
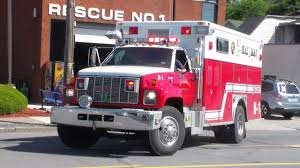
    HAZMAT-1 Responding
- Truck Company No. 4 located at 1047 N Main Ave, Scranton, PA 18508
  - This station houses Truck Company No. 4, and Engine Company No. 9 (Reserve). This station's first due covers West Side, North Scranton, Tripp Park, the Plot Section, parts of Central City, and Keyser Valley as its first due area. This company is on all second alarm fires. Engine Company No. 9 is only dispatched when additional staffing is needed or when acting as a replacement for another company.
- Engine Company No. 7 located at 1917 Luzerne St, Scranton, PA 18504
  - This station houses Engine Company No. 7, Truck Company No. 1 (Reserve), and Attack No. 1 (Brush). This station's first due is West Side, Bellevue, West Mountain and Keyser Valley. When called on a second alarm it will go to North Scranton and parts of Central City. When requested Engine Co. 7 will also assist the Taylor Volunteer Fire Department and the Newton/Ransom Volunteer Fire Department. This station also repairs the department's fire helmets. Truck Company No. 1 is only dispatched when additional staffing is needed or when acting as a replacement for another company. Attack No. 1 is only dispatched when requested for brush fires or other specialty incidents.
- Engine Company No. 8 located at 205 W Market St, Scranton, PA 18508
  - This station houses Engine Company No. 8 and Car 30, the mobile air re-supply unit. This station's first due area is North Scranton, the Plot, and parts of Green Ridge. In the event of a second alarm fire Engine Co. 8 will go to West Side, Central City, parts of the Hill Section and Keyser Valley. This station also stores the mobile smoke house, used for presentations primarily for children to teach how to escape from a home fire. Car 30 is only dispatched when requested for specialty incidents or large structure fires.
- Engine Company No. 10 located at 1900 E Mountain Rd, Scranton, PA 18505
  - This station houses Engine Company No. 10. this station responds to all of East Mountain, most of the Hill Section, and parts of upper South Side for first alarm assignments. On a second alarm it will respond to South Side, Minooka, parts of Central City.
