= Union Fire Company =

First volunteer fire company in North America

Coordinates: 39.9503°N 75.1444°W

Union Fire Company, sometimes called Franklin's Bucket Brigade, was a volunteer fire department formed in Philadelphia in 1736 with the assistance of Benjamin Franklin. It was the first firefighting organization in Philadelphia, although it was followed within the year by establishment of the Fellowship Fire Company. The fire company was formed on 7 December 1736 after a series of publications in the Pennsylvania Gazette by Franklin and others pointing out the need for more effective handling of fires in Philadelphia and remained active until approximately 1820. Although modeled after the Mutual Fire Societies of Franklin's native Boston, the Union Fire Company protected all members of the community rather than only the members of the company.

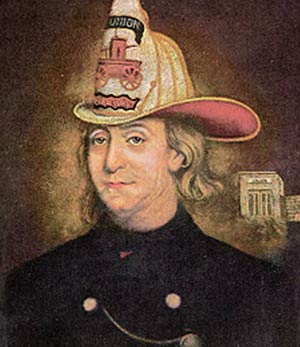
Benjamin Franklin, the Fireman, ca 1850. Charles Washington Wright. Franklin is depicted in the fire helmet worn by the Union Fire Company. The painting contains a significant anachronism. The fire helmet depicted was not invented until more than thirty years after Franklin's death.

== Organization ==
In the 1884 book History of Philadelphia, 1609–1884, John Thomas Scharf and Thompson Westcott described the organization of the company:

The Union Fire Company was an association for mutual assistance. Each member agreed to furnish, at his own expense, six leather buckets and two stout linen bags, each marked with his name and the name of the company, which he was to bring to every fire. The buckets were for carrying water to extinguish the flames, and the bags were to receive and hold property which was in danger, to save it from risk of theft. The members pledged themselves to repair to any place in danger upon an alarm of fire with their apparatus. Some were to superintend the use of the water, others were to stand at the doors of houses in danger, and to protect the property from theft. On an alarm of fire at night it was agreed that lights should be placed in the windows of houses of members near the fire "in order to prevent confusion, and to enable their friends to give them more speedy and effectual assistance.'

According to Scharf and Westcott, the company was limited to 30 members who met eight times a year and agreed to pay a small fee, used for purchasing fire-fighting equipment, if they were late to or missed a meeting. The company had no president, but a treasurer and a clerk, take in turns from the general membership, who not only managed communications with other members but also inspected the gear. Scharf and Westcott note that this structure was the basis for all fire companies in Philadelphia until the Revolutionary War. The early members of the Company included Isaac Paschal, Samuel Powel, William Rawle and Samuel Syme.

== Equipment ==
With respect to the equipment, Scharf and Westcott note the following:

At this time engines and buckets were the only available apparatus, as pumps were few, and the supply of water scant. The engine of the Union Company, it is believed, was imported from England, as were also those of the other companies formed down to 1768. The engine of the Union Company was probably kept in a house in Grindstone Alley, which runs north from Market Street to Church Alley, west of Second Street.

In 1752, the Union Fire Company went in with the Hand-in-Hand Fire Company to purchase a fire bell which was placed on Fourth Street where it could be heard throughout the city. By 1791, the company was in possession of an 80 feet (24 m) fire hose, considerably shorter than the 120 feet (37 m) hose owned by the Fellowship Fire Company. In addition, in that year, according to Franklin autobiography editor John Bigelow, the Company possessed 250 buckets, 13 ladders, two hooks and "no bags."

== Articles of the Union Fire Company ==
On 7 December 1736, members drafted the Articles of the Union Fire Company. This document defined the duties of the organization's members, including providing equipment and rotating duties. Members agreed to meet on the last Monday of every month and to pay fees for lost buckets or bags. Equipment damaged in a fire was replaced by the company. The article was completed and signed on 30 May 1737.

=== Signers of the Articles of 1737 ===
- Joseph Paschall
- Samuel Coates
- John Armitt
- William Rawle
- Benjamin Shoemaker
- Hugh Roberts
- Benjamin Franklin
- Philip Syng Jr.
- William Parsons
- Richard Sewell
- James Morris
- Stephen Armitt
- Thomas Hatton
- Edward Roberts
- George House
- William Plumsted
- John Dillwyn
- William Cooper
- Edward Shippen
- Lloyd Zachary
- Samuel Powel
- Thomas Lloyd
- George Emlen
- Charles Willing
- Thomas Lawrence
- William Bell
- Jo Turner

== See also ==
- List of Pennsylvania fire departments

== External sources ==
- Scharf, John Thomas; Thompson Westcott (1884). History of Philadelphia, 1609–1884. L. H. Everts & co. public domain
