= Academy Manor (Pennsylvania) =

Coordinates: 40.29294°N 76.90495°W

- Neighborhood of Harrisburg
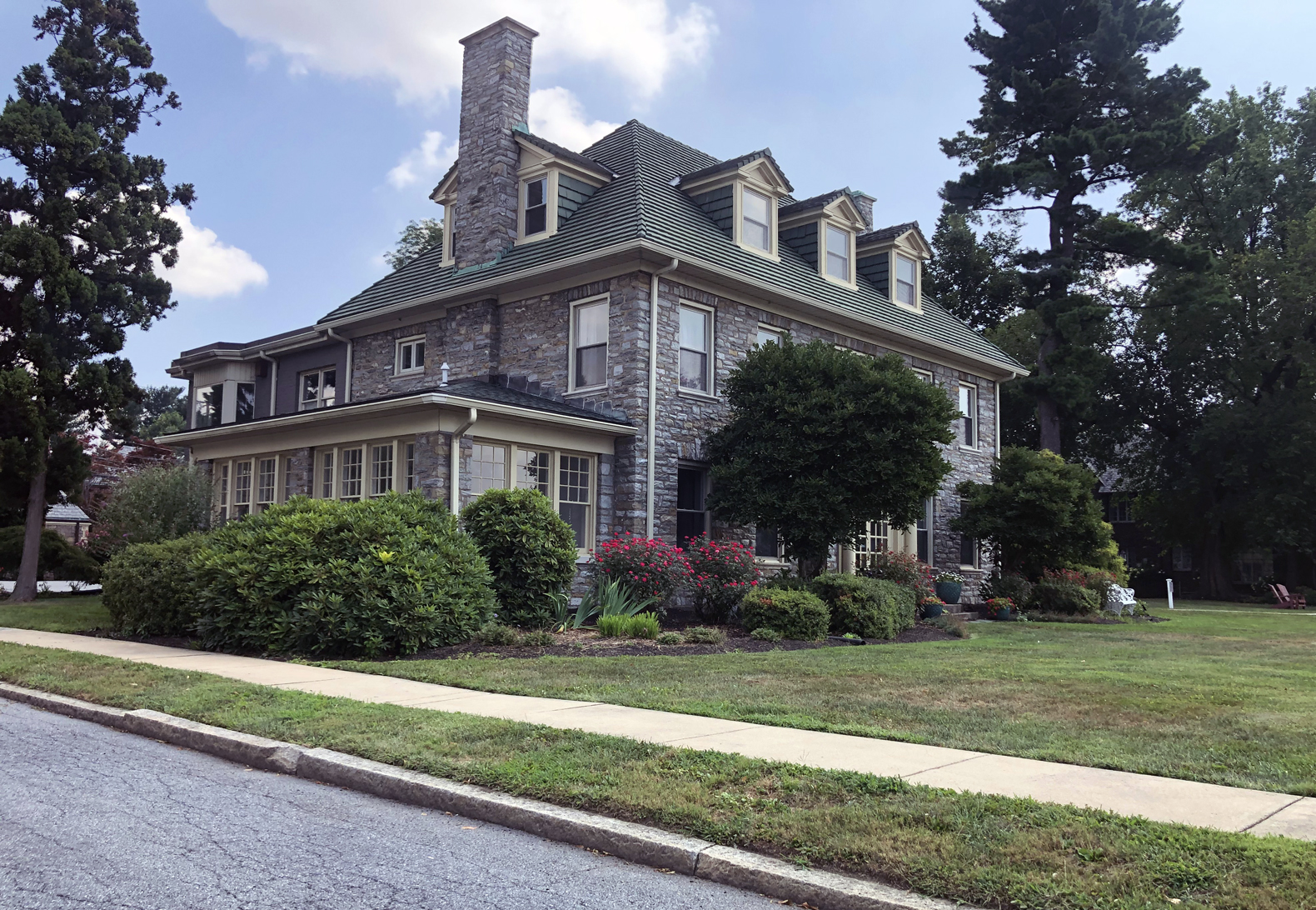
- The Manor on Front, now a bed & breakfast, is one mansion of the Academy Manor section of Riverside
- Interactive map of Academy Manor
- Country: United States
- State: Pennsylvania
- County: Dauphin County
- City: Harrisburg
- ZIP Code: 17110
- Area codes: 717 and 223

Academy Manor is a historical suburban subdivision of the Riverside neighborhood within the Uptown section of Harrisburg, Pennsylvania. The neighborhood extends north from Front and Division Street up to the location of former Harrisburg Academy (the neighborhood's namesake), west to Parkview Lane, and south back to Division St. It was established in the early 20th century with specific plans in terms of lot sizes, setbacks, and the kinds of buildings permitted.

== History ==
After the greater Riverside neighborhood was annexed to Harrisburg in 1917, Academy Manor was a separately designated tract and in 1922 and lots were designated for sale. Prominent Harrisburg families and residents would go on to build mansions in various styles. In 1951, the Pennsylvania Supreme Court in detailing a report of areas of Harrisburg listed the Academy Manor neighborhood as 89 lots restricted for residential purposes, as compared to 337 in the surrounding Riverside neighborhood. In 2005, a proposal to demolish some of the mansions for condominiums raised public opposition. After being approved by the Harrisburg Planning Commission in June 2005, a Bill in Harrisburg City Council was to be introduced in September 2009 to make Academy Manor a Municipal Historic District, but was removed from the agenda earlier in the day of the Council's meeting without explanation.

== See also ==
- Italian Lake
