= Camp Curtin, Harrisburg, Pennsylvania =

Neighborhood of Harrisburg in Pennsylvania, United States

Coordinates: 40.28217°N 76.89116°W

Camp Curtin
- Neighborhood of Harrisburg
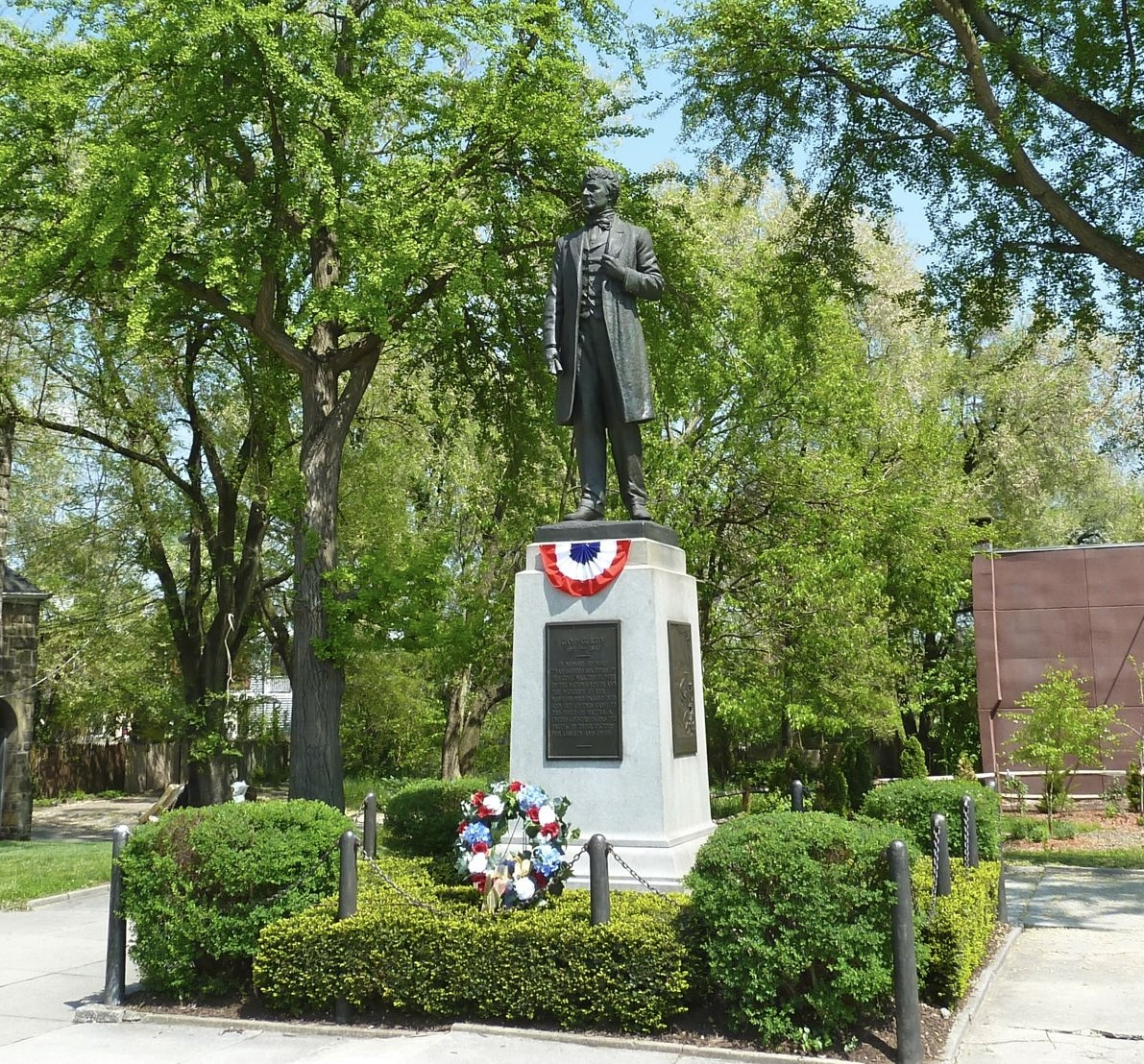
- Statue of Andrew Curtin located centrally within the neighborhood
- Interactive map of Camp Curtin
- Country: United States
- State: Pennsylvania
- County: Dauphin County
- City: Harrisburg
- ZIP code: 17110
- Area codes: 717 and 223

Camp Curtin is a historic neighborhood in Harrisburg, Pennsylvania's northern end, located in Uptown and named for the American Civil War camp of the same name. It is bordered currently by landmarks of Fifth Street to the west, the railroad tracks next to the Pennsylvania Farm Show Complex to the east, Maclay Street to the south, and Reels Lane to the North.

== History ==
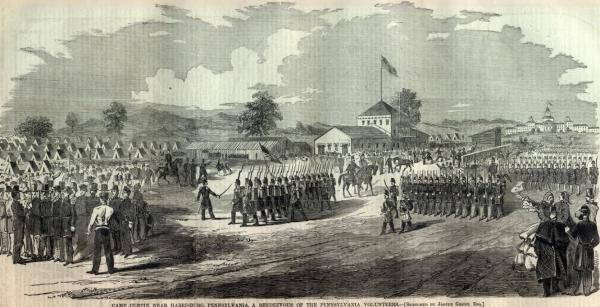
Camp Curtin on the grounds of an agricultural school near Harrisburg at the start of the American Civil War (Harper's Weekly, September 1862)

Following the secession of southern states from the United States during late 1860 and early 1861 and the subsequent fall of Fort Sumter to Confederate States Army forces during mid-April 1861, U.S. President Abraham Lincoln called for 75,000 volunteers to protect the nation's capital during what became the beginning of the American Civil War. Almost immediately, the city of Harrisburg was transformed from being the capital city of the second largest state in America to a hub where men from Pennsylvania, Maryland, Michigan, Minnesota, New Jersey, New York, Ohio, Wisconsin, and the Regular Army responded to that call and subsequent calls by Lincoln for additional troops because the city was located at the intersection of major railroad hubs and was close enough to make transport of those men to Washington, D.C. and other battle sites relatively quick and easy.

In order to process the hundreds of thousands of men who would pass through Harrisburg as Union Army soldiers between April 1861 and early January 1866, leaders of the federal government and state of Pennsylvania immediately established a new military training camp on the grounds of an agricultural school in what is, today, the Uptown area of Harrisburg. Named in honor of Pennsylvania's sitting governor at the time, Andrew Curtin, a close friend of Lincoln's who quickly mobilized the Pennsylvania Reserves in support of Lincoln's call for troops, the camp officially opened on April 18, 1861, and also included a supply depot, hospital and prisoner-of-war camp. Ultimately, more than 300,000 Union Army soldiers passed through Camp Curtin, making it the largest Federal military training camp during the Civil War. At war's end, Camp Curtin was then used as a key mustering-out point for many of those soldiers troops as they made their way back home. It officially closed on November 11, 1865.

Before the decade was out, the grounds of the former military camp were again being "turned up by the plow," according to newspapers of the period.

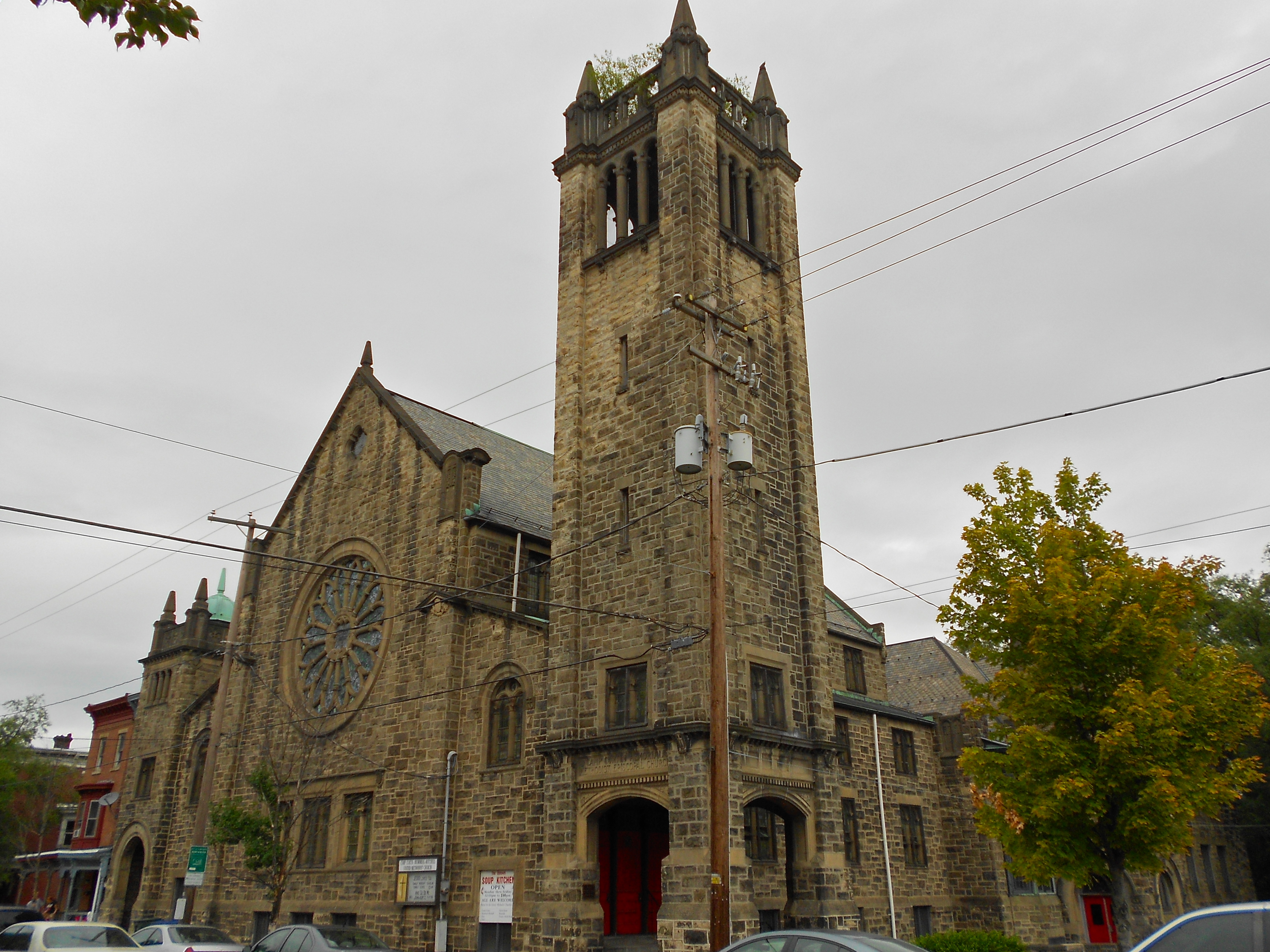
Placed on the National Register of Historic Places in 2010, the Camp Curtin Memorial Methodist Episcopal Church was built in 1895.

In 1890, a new religious institution, the Camp Curtin Memorial Methodist Episcopal Church, was erected on part of the grounds of the former military training camp. Built at the intersection of Camp, North Sixth, and Woodbine Streets "as a monument to 'old Camp Curtin'", its cornerstone was placed in May 1890. The church's edifice was then dedicated in July of that same year. Three years later, the building was expanded to accommodate the church's growing membership. Following a devastating fire the next year, a cornerstone for a new building was placed in 1895, followed by dedication ceremonies in September of that same year. By 1915, church members were raising the $38,000 necessary to create a significantly larger facility – one which would include a gymnasium, library, locker rooms, and shower baths which would be "open to all the young men and women of the community regardless of their religious affiliation" with the expectation that it would become "a 'social center' rivalling any in the State." The pastor of the church during this phase of its growth was the Rev. A. S. Williams. Editors of the Harrisburg Telegraph wrote in April 1915 that the new church would "mark for all time the noted encampment, the location of which has been well nigh lost in the rapid growth of the town that has swept out over the open fields above Maclay street, where formerly was the tented military city, and has transformed them into populous, closely-built residence districts."

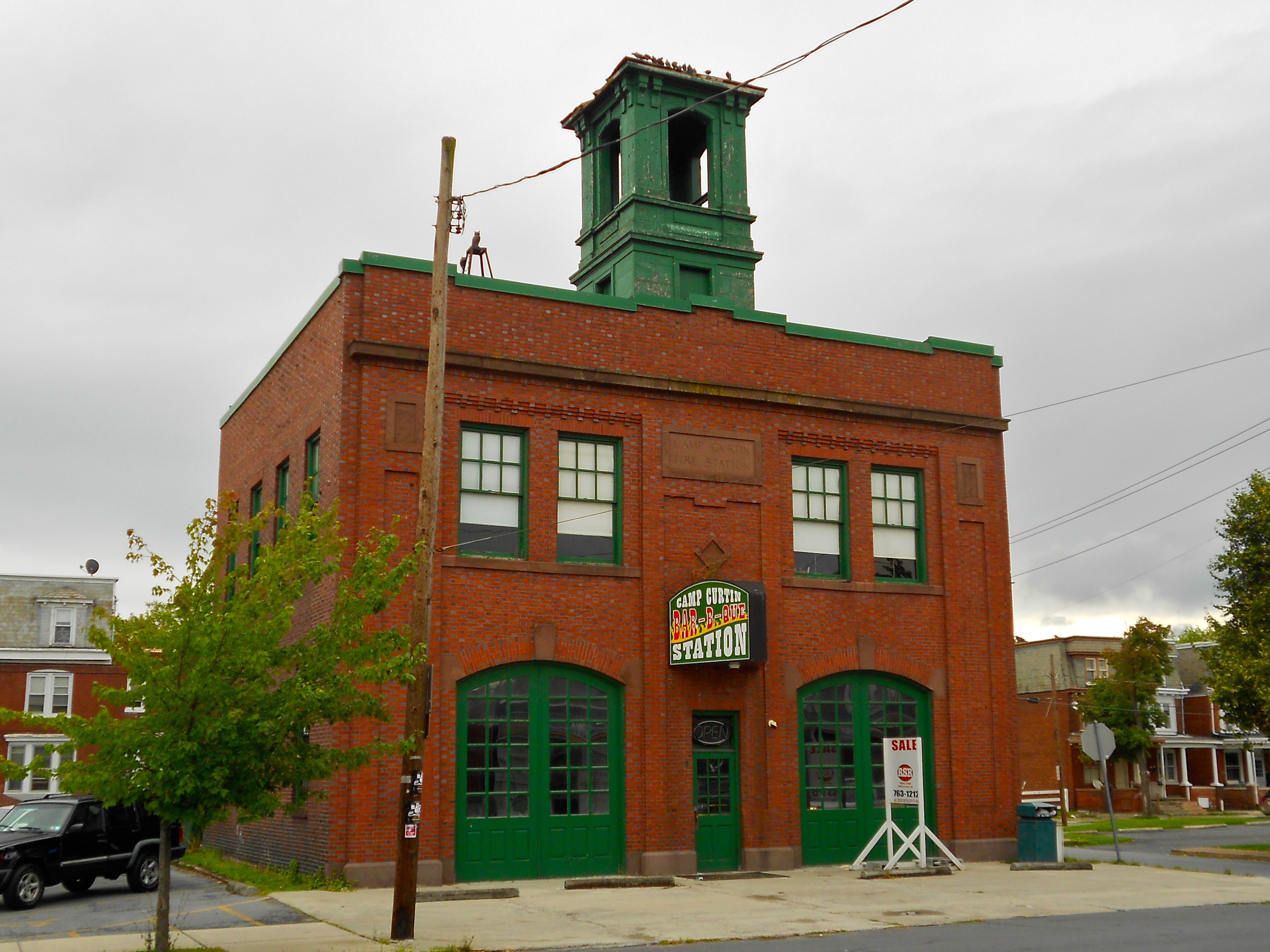
Built circa 1910–1911, the Camp Curtin Fire Station building was added to the National Register of Historic Places in 1981.

Additional community services continued to be added to the neighborhood, including the Camp Curtin Fire Station, which was built circa 1910–1911.

During the 1920s, leaders of the Commonwealth of Pennsylvania further memorialized the importance of the former military camp by erecting a statue of Curtin in front of the Camp Curtin Memorial Methodist Episcopal Church.

Facilities available to residents of the neighborhood during the 1970s included the: Camp Curtin Community Park, a 12-acre green space available to children and adults; the Camp Curtin Early Childhood Center at 2900 North Sixth Street; and the Camp Curtin indoor recreation center, which was equipped with a gym and auditorium.

=== 21st-century neighborhood life ===
During the second decade of the 21st century, civic leaders in this area of Harrisburg formed the Camp Curtin Community Neighborhood United project to inspire residents and business owners to work collaboratively on community reinvestment and public safety initiatives. Meeting monthly in the boardroom of the Wesley Union African Methodist Episcopal Zion Church (Wesley Union AME Zion Church), the religious institution at Fifth and Camp streets which is pastored by the Rev. Willie Dixon (one of the civic leaders instrumental in founding the CCCNU), the organization had 40 members as of 2014. Three CCCNU working groups were then formed to focus on improving educational opportunities for residents and on fighting blight and crime in sections of the neighborhood running from Division to Maclay Streets and from Fourth to Seventh Streets while a fourth came together to create a neighborhood profile with data regarding residents' age and income levels, educational backgrounds and homeownership statistics to help neighborhood leaders collaborate more effectively with government officials to improve Camp Curtin's quality of life. CCCNU's president in 2019 was Joyce V. Gamble, a retired nurse.

In 2013, Jean H. Cutler, the former director of the Bureau for Historic Preservation at the Pennsylvania Historical and Museum Commission, was given PHMC's Visionary in Historic Preservation Award for "helping Pennsylvania communities embrace strong preservation values" and demonstrating "extraordinary effort and innovation in educating and planning for the future of the Commonwealth’s cultural and historic resources." Among her projects, Cutler had been helping "the Camp Curtin Community Neighborhood United Project capitalize on the area’s railroad and Civil War history to promote civic pride and reinvestment."

The Camp Curtin Academy, which is part of the Harrisburg School District, is located in the neighborhood at 2900 North 6th Street. According to 2014 enrollment figures, the student body included 739 pupils from grades 5th through 8th with 87.8 percent receiving free lunches due to family poverty. Special education services were also provided to 28 percent of the student population. Ninety-eight percent of the school's faculty were rated by the Pennsylvania Department of Education as being highly qualified (per federal No Child Left Behind Act standards). In 2010, according to the National Center for Education Statistics, the school enrolled 670 students from preschool through 8th grade in 2010, 575 of whom received federal free lunches. With a staff of 61 teachers, the student–teacher ratio that year was 11:1.

As of 2019, according to the neighborhood's page on Nextdoor, the population of the Camp Curtin neighborhood was 6,204, 58 percent of whom were homeowners. The average age of residents was 49.

== See also ==
- List of Harrisburg neighborhoods
