= Camp Curtin Memorial Methodist Episcopal Church =

Historic church in Pennsylvania, United States

- U.S. National Register of Historic Places
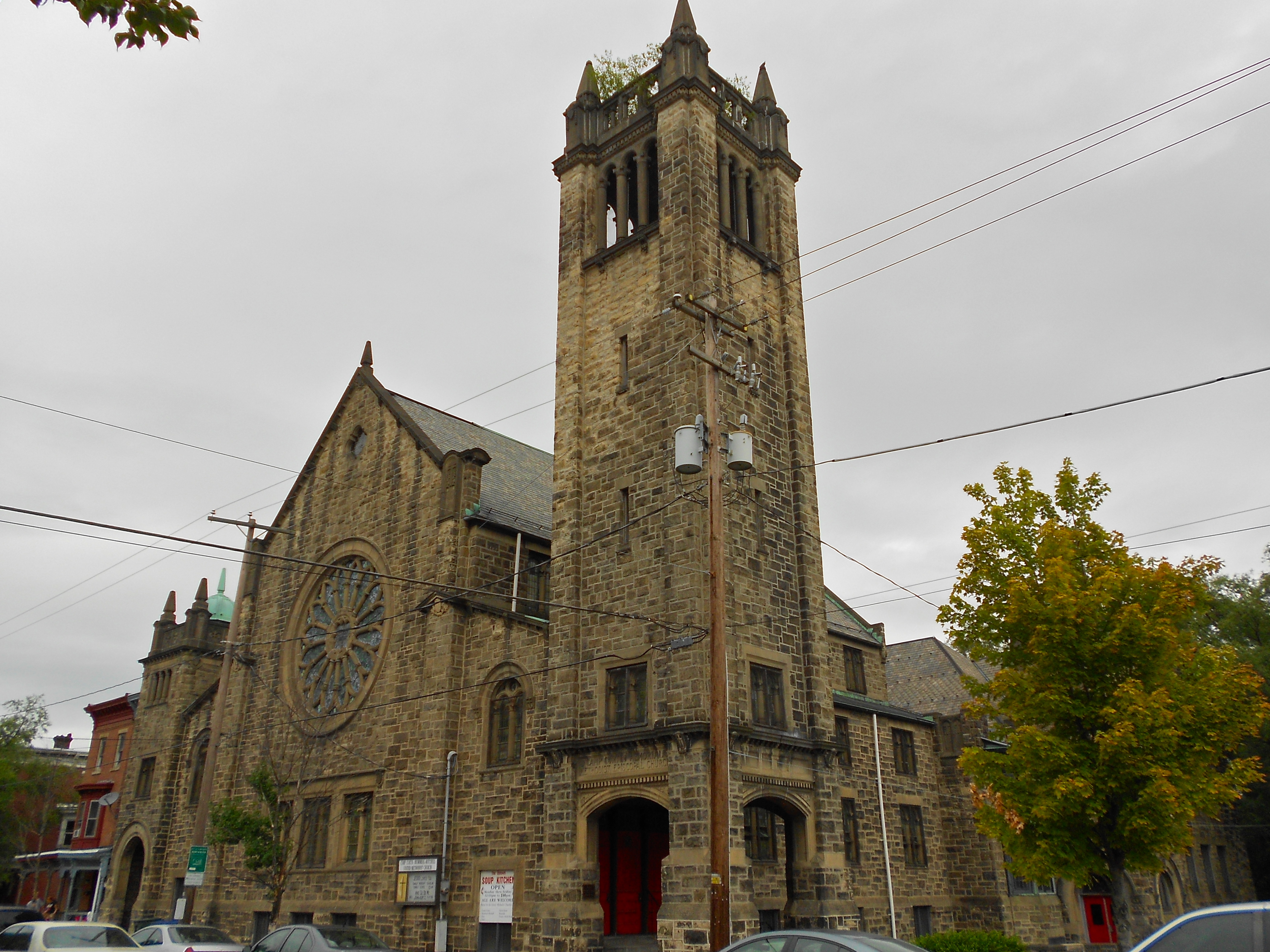
- Camp Curtin Memorial Methodist Episcopal Church, c. 2010

- Location within Pennsylvania Location within the United States
- Location: 2221 N Sixth St., Harrisburg, Pennsylvania
- Coordinates: 40°15′34″N 76°52′45″W
- Area: less than one acre
- Built: 1895, 1916
- Architect: Badgley, Sidney R.; Hamilton, Thomas; Savage, George E.; Sollenberger, C.A.
- Architectural style: Late Victorian, Romanesque
- NRHP reference No.: 10000400
- Added to NRHP: August 5, 2010

Camp Curtin Memorial Methodist Episcopal Church, also known as Curtin Heights Church and Camp Curtin Memorial-Mitchell United Methodist Church, is a historic Methodist Episcopal church located in Harrisburg, Dauphin County, Pennsylvania.

It was added to the National Register of Historic Places in 2010. The Susquehanna Conference of the United Methodist Church announced plans, in December 2018, to consolidate or sell roughly 10 churches in the greater Harrisburg area. In February 2021, newspapers reported that Camp Curtin Memorial-Mitchell United Methodist Church would be sold "to a church off of the west coast that is buying it as a church for veterans," and that "a veterans' ministry" would be established at the historic church; however, the realtor involved in the transaction reported a month later that the church was "back on the market" because the deal had fallen through. News accounts at the time noted that the realtor's most recent listing stated that the "15,852-square-foot property [was] listed for $155K," and that the church was] zoned 'commercial neighborhood,' which provides the possibility of a number of uses for the property."

== History ==
Following the formation, by eight Harrisburg residents, of a Methodist Society in February 1889, that society's leadership founded a Sunday school on May 12 of that same year, and began providing spiritual education to 50 participants on a regular basis at a room above the Rife's & Reese's grocery store on Woodbine Street. To accommodate a growing congregation, the Rev. J.S. Wilcox spearheaded efforts to build a new chapel. The cornerstone for that new building was laid on May 11, 1890, and the building, officially known as the Curtin Heights Episcopal Church, was dedicated in December 1891 on the site of the long since demolished Camp Curtin, a major Union Army training camp during the American Civil War.

Two new wings were subsequently added to this chapel in 1893, but that expanded building lasted only a short time. Destroyed by fire on December 30, 1894, a new church was built by the congregation on the same site. Completed under the leadership of Dr. S. Fasick, its doors were open by July 1895; it was then formally dedicated on December 15 of that same year.

The church's name was officially changed to Camp Curtin Memorial Methodist Episcopal Church by an amendment to the church's charter in September 1914. Later that same year, church leaders approved an expansion of the church, raised $38,000 in support of that effort, and rededicated the church as a memorial to all Civil War soldiers.

Urged in 1915 by the church's pastor, Rev. Alvin S. Williams, to continue expanding the church to accommodate a growing congregation, $60,000 was raised, and ground was broken on December 3, 1916 for a new sanctuary and auditorium with seating for 700.

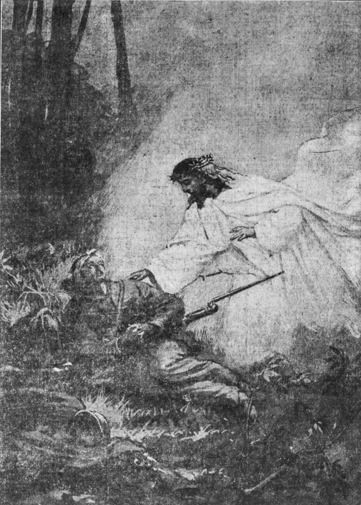
C. Day Rudy's mural of Christ with an American Civil War soldier which was painted for the Camp Curtin M.E. Church in Harrisburg, Pennsylvania ("Harrisburg Telegraph," May 27, 1916).

That same year (1915), a painting of Christ appearing to a dying soldier was commissioned by the church, and C. Day Rudy, a Civil War orphan, was chosen to create the allegorical work, which was dedicated on Memorial Day weekend that year (May 30, 1916). Rudy also then later crafted the stained glass Rose Window which has been preserved in the church's present-day sanctuary. In June, congregants petitioned the Pennsylvania Legislature to erect a monument near the church memorializing the site of the church as the site of the historic Civil War-era training camp mentioned above. The petition read:

"We, the undersigned, citizens of Harrisburg, Pa., the State of Pennsylvania to memorialize the Civil War recruiting camp, named in honor of the great War Governor, Camp Curtin, respectfully petition thee coming session of the State Legislature to procure the vacant plot of land located between Camp Curtin school building and the Camp Curtin Memorial Church on Sixth Street, Harrisburg, Pa., as a site for the erection of a worthy recognition in monument or if desired a statue.... We also ask the cooperation of all public officeholders of Harrisburg and Dauphin county and all patriotic societies and all political parties to help us in thus honoring the memory of our great War Governor and the 100,000 soldiers who, in the days of '61 and '65, went forth from old Camp Curtin to preserve the union."

That same year, beginning on December 3, 1916, and continuing for a week afterward, the church hosted as series of dedication events. On December 3, [t]hree of the biggest men in the Methodist Church world," Bishop W. F. McDowell of Washington, the Rev. Dr. John Krantz of New York City, and the church's district superintendent, the Rev. Dr. A. S. Fasick of Carlisle, officiated at the opening event with Fasick delivering the opening prayer and Krantz delivering the sermon during the morning service and afternoon Sunday school session, and McDowell and Krantz delivering addresses during the evening services.

Then, on December 6, a group of Civil War Veterans, Sons of Union Veterans, and veterans of other wars attended a special patriotic service at the church, which was "held in connection with the dedication of the new $60,000 edifice erected as a monument to Camp Curtin of Civil War days where 300,000 men were mustered into the service of the Union." The service was conducted after the veterans had marched to the church together. Local Grand Army of the Republic (G.A.R.) posts then presented an American flag to church leaders, followed by a presentation speech by Colonel H. C. Demming and an acceptance speech by David Cotterel. A formal address regarding the important role played by the recruitment and training camp during the war was then delivered to the audience by Professor Leon C. Prince, chair of the history department at Dickinson College. Following a performance by Estelle Butler of the Civil War-era song, "We Are Camping To-night," attendees dined on bean soup in the church's social room.

The formal dedication then concluded on Sunday, December 10 with a sermon by Bishop William Burt.

In 1917, the church hosted a performance by the Musical Art Society of Handel's Messiah in January, and also held a series of programs for Rally Day in September. Two years later, William R. Stonesifer was appointed as the church's organist and choir director.

When the Methodist church's three branches were merged in 1939, the name of this church in Harrisburg was then officially changed to the Camp Curtin Memorial Methodist Church. Nearly thirty years later, when the Methodist church merged with the Evangelical United Brethren Church on April 23, 1969, the name was changed to Camp Curtin Memorial United Methodist Church. On June 25, 1989, this church then merged with Mitchell United Methodist to become the present-day Camp Curtin Memorial-Mitchell United Methodist Church. The pastor as of 2019 is the Rev. John L. Kurtz.

== Architectural details ==
The Camp Curtin Memorial Methodist Episcopal Church is a masonry constructed building faced with buff Holmesburg granite over brick in a Late Victorian / Romanesque style. The main church building holds one of the largest pipe organs in Harrisburg; it was designed and installed in 1917 by the M. P. Moller company.

The rear section of this church was built in 1895 as the congregation's primary place of worship. The cornerstone for a new, larger sanctuary was subsequently laid in the fall of 1915; that section, which was attached to the church's front on Sixth Street, was completed in 1916, and featured a high tower and belfry with parapets and pinnacles.

This church was added to the National Register of Historic Places in 2010.

== Present day ==
In December 2018, the Susquehanna Conference of the United Methodist Church announced plans to consolidate or sell roughly 10 churches in the greater Harrisburg area. In February 2021, newspapers reported that Camp Curtin Memorial-Mitchell United Methodist Church would be sold "to a church off of the west coast that is buying it as a church for veterans"; however, the realtor involved in the transaction then reported a month later that the church was "back on the market" because the deal had fallen through. News accounts noted that the realtor's most recent listing stated that the "15,852-square-foot property [was] listed for $155K," and that the church [was] zoned 'commercial neighborhood,' [providing] the possibility of a number of uses for the property." From the time of its announcement, however, the Susquehanna Conference's plan to consolidate or sell the ten churches has met resistance from historic preservationists and members of the congregations of the church properties proposed for sale; according to a newspaper interview with Claude Phipps, chairman of the parish steering committee at the Derry Street United Methodist Church, "the conference has mismanaged the situation and has in the process given off the optics of racism."

"These churches are trying to hold minority neighborhoods together.... You are kicking out the last pedestal just as the neighborhood is starting to be revitalized.... You have three churches in New Cumberland within three blocks of each other. Why aren’t you closing them?"

The "consolidation plan was rolled out by a West Shore-based management hierarchy and targeted East Shore churches," according to Camp Curtin Memorial-Mitchell preservation and restoration committee member Rhonda Mays," who added that "in its evaluation of her church the conference portrayed the historic parish as failing in ministry and outreach." Explaining that, although Camp Curtin Memorial's church service attendance averages roughly just 40 people each week, the church's "real impact is felt throughout the rest of the week across the community, which relies on the church’s vast network of social services," including health care services and a critically important soup kitchen.

Added David Morrison, the executive director of Historic Harrisburg Association, Camp Curtain-Memorial Mitchell is "something of a landmark ... and its value in terms of heritage, tourism and education regarding the Civil War is significant."

== See also ==
- Camp Curtin: Wikipedia page for the Union Army's American Civil War-era recruitment and training camp
- Camp Curtin Fire Station: Wikipedia page for the historic fire station in Harrisburg, Pennsylvania
- Camp Curtin, Harrisburg, Pennsylvania: Wikipedia page for the Camp Curtin neighborhood in Harrisburg, Pennsylvania
- Harrisburg School District: Wikipedia page which contains information regarding the Camp Curtin School
