= Harrisburg Academy =

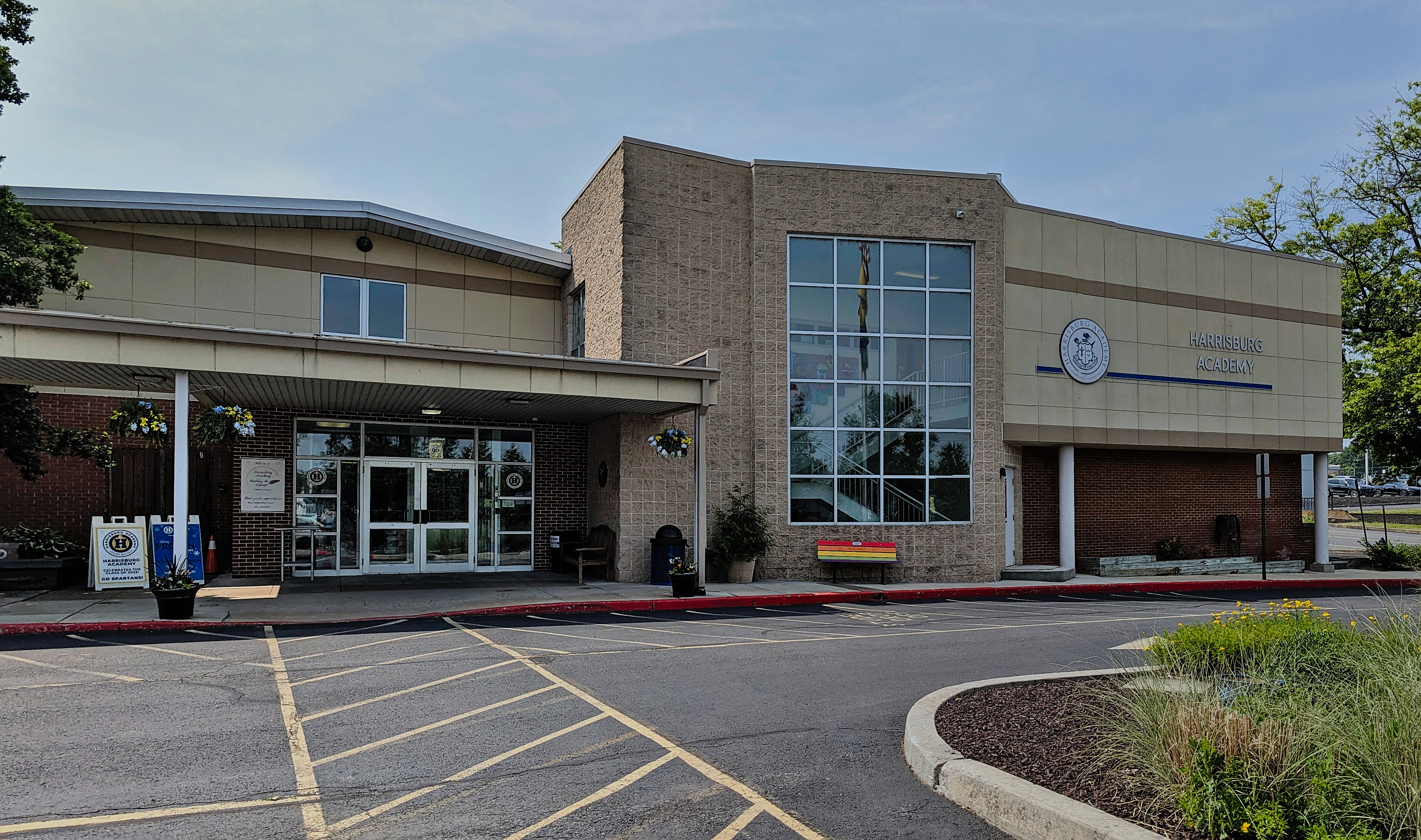
- Harrisburg Academy entrance
- 10 Erford Road, Wormleysburg, Pennsylvania; United States of America

Information
- Type: Independent, day, college preparatory
- Motto: Learn Boldly
- Religious affiliation: Nonsectarian
- Established: 1784
- Founder: John Harris Jr.
- Grades: K–12
- Gender: Coeducational
- Campus type: Large Suburban
- Colors: Blue & Gold
- Nickname: Spartans
- Accreditation: NAIS
- Website: www.harrisburgacademy.org

Harrisburg Academy is an independent, coeducational, college preparatory day school in Wormleysburg, Pennsylvania, United States. The school has a diverse student body in nursery through 12th grade. The school was established in 1784 by John Harris Jr., the founder of Harrisburg.

Harrisburg Academy was originally located at the John Harris Mansion and later in the eponymous Academy Manor section of the Riverside neighborhood along North Front Street, but is now located on a 24-acre (9.6 ha) campus about one mile (1.6 km) west of the Susquehanna River in Wormleysburg, a suburb of Harrisburg, Pennsylvania. In 1992-93, the school was nationally recognized as a Blue Ribbon School by the U.S. Department of Education for its academic excellence. It is now known as an IB school

The school has a combined enrollment of 420 students, has 53 full-time faculty, and has an annual budget (in 2005) of $6.5M.

== Athletic program ==
Harrisburg Academy offers a variety of athletic programs. Athletic teams compete actively against other independent, parochial and smaller public schools.

In 2008, a two-year commitment between the academy and Trinity High School allows students to play for each other's designated athletic teams.

The Academy offers athletic programs for cross-country, soccer, tennis, basketball, and swimming.

== Notable alumni ==
- George Hough Bucher – Pennsylvania State Senator
- David Fleming – Pennsylvania State Senator
- George Kunkel – Pennsylvania State Senator
- John C. Kunkel – a prominent American politician and Republican member of the U.S. House of Representatives from Pennsylvania
- Sarah Longwell - Republican political strategist and publisher of the conservative news and opinion website The Bulwark.
- Matthias Loy - American Lutheran theologian in the Evangelical Lutheran Joint Synod of Ohio
- Vance C. McCormick – an American politician and prominent businessman; appointed chair by President Woodrow Wilson of the American delegation at the Treaty of Versailles in 1919.
- David A. Randall Book dealer, librarian and Professor of Bibliography at Indiana University
- Arthur Ringwalt Rupley – Republican member of the U.S. House of Representatives from Pennsylvania
- Edward J. Stackpole – Newspaper publisher, author, U.S. Army major general
