= Camp Curtin =

Union Army training camp in Pennsylvania

- Part of United States Army (Union)
- Agricultural school grounds, Harrisburg, Pennsylvania
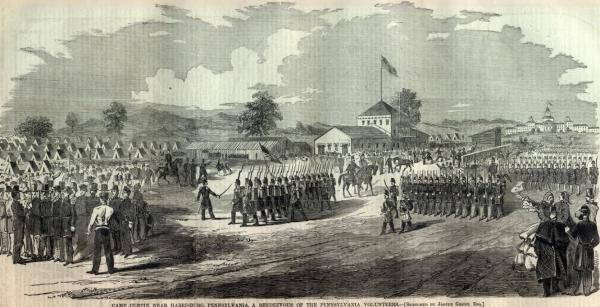
- Camp Curtin, Harper's Weekly, September 1862

Site information
- Type: military muster-in and training center

Site history
- Built: April 18, 1861
- In use: April 18, 1861 - November 11, 1865
- Demolished: 1865-1867

Camp Curtin was a major Union Army training camp in Harrisburg, Pennsylvania, during the American Civil War. It was located north of Pennsylvania's state capitol building on 80 acres of what had previously been land used by the Dauphin County Agricultural Fairgrounds.

== History ==
When news of the bombardment and subsequent surrender of Fort Sumter in Charleston, South Carolina reached Washington, D.C. on April 14, 1861, President Abraham Lincoln called for 75,000 volunteers to join the Army to quell the rebellion of the Southern states. Across the North, eager recruits responded to calls from local governmental officials to join newly raised state regiments. Governor Andrew Curtin of Pennsylvania issued a proclamation asking for 13,000 able-bodied men to volunteer to help preserve the Union. Within three days, thousands of men had converged at Harrisburg to enlist, but they had no formal place to organize or drill. Dauphin County officials offered Governor Curtin the use of the County Agricultural Society on the northern outskirts of Harrisburg for these volunteers. Maj. Joseph F. Knipe officially opened the camp on April 18, 1861, and named it Camp Curtin in honor of the governor (the planned name had been Camp Union). From December 1861 to March 1862, the camp was commanded by Truman Seymour.

More than 300,000 soldiers passed through Camp Curtin, making it the largest Federal camp during the Civil War. By the summer of 1862, newspapers were reporting that the number of federal troops at the camp had grown so large that it took twenty tons of cooked provisions to create the rations for each of the men who were being trained for battle. Harrisburg's location on major railroad lines running east and west, and north and south made it the ideal location for moving men and supplies to the armies in the field. In addition to Pennsylvania regiments, troops from Maryland, Michigan, Minnesota, New Jersey, New York, Ohio, Wisconsin, and the Regular Army used Camp Curtin. The camp and surrounding area also saw service as a supply depot, hospital and prisoner-of-war camp. At the end of the war, Camp Curtin was used as a mustering-out point for thousands of troops on their way home. It was officially closed on November 11, 1865.

=== 1861 ===
In 1861, between April 18 and 22, the following units mustered in at Camp Curtin:

- April 18: Allen Infantry (Lehigh County), Johnstown Infantry and Johnstown Zouave Cadets (Johnstown), National Light Infantry, Pittsburgh Rifles (Pittsburgh) and Ringgold Artillery (Reading)
- April 20: Bellfeonte Fencibles (Bellfonte), Cameron Guards (Cameron County), Chambers Artillery (Companies A, B and C), Citizen Artillery, Citizen Zouaves, Easton Fencibles (Easton), Hollidaysburg Fencibles (Hollidaysburg), Independent Infantry, Jackson Rifles, Juniata Rifles (Juniata County), Lancaster Fencibles (Lancaster), Lewisburg Infantry (Lewisburg), Logan Rifle Rangers, National Guards, Negly's Zouaves, Scott Guards, Reading Artillerists, Shawnee Guards, State Capital Guard, State Guards, Turner Rifles, Tyrone Artillerists (Tyrone), Union Light Infantry, Union Rifles (Delaware), U.S. Zouaves (Pittsburgh), Washington Greys, Wayne Guards, West Chester Rifles
- April 21: Brigade Rifles (Minersville), Columbia Infantry, Eagle Guards, Keystone Rifles, Lebanon Guards (Lebanon), Madison Guards, National Artillery, Minersville Artillerists, Norris City Rifles (Companies A and B), Scott Artillery (Schuylkill Haven), Standing Stone Guard, Wayne Artillery, Wyoming Artillery
- April 22: Allegheny Light Guards and Allegheny Rifles (Allegheny County), Anderson Greys (Companies A and B), Ashland Rifles (Ashland), Brady Alpines (Armstrong County), Burns Infantry, Cameron Infantry, which was named after J. D. Cameron of Harrisburg and was the only uniformed company at Camp Curtin as of late May, First Pennsylvania Zouaves (Pittsburgh), Llewellyn Rifles (Llewellyn), Marion Rifles (Schuylkill County), Nagle Guards (Pottsville), Pittsburgh Invincibles (Pittsburgh), Port Clinton Artillery (Port Clinton), Scranton Union Volunteers (Scranton), Tower Guards (Schuylkill County), Washington Rifles, Wyoming Light Dragoons.

During the summer of 1861, multiple members of the Pennsylvania State Legislature were mustered into federal service as members of the Legislative Guard.

Within months of the camp's opening, news reports began appearing of alleged Confederate spies being caught at the camp and jailed.

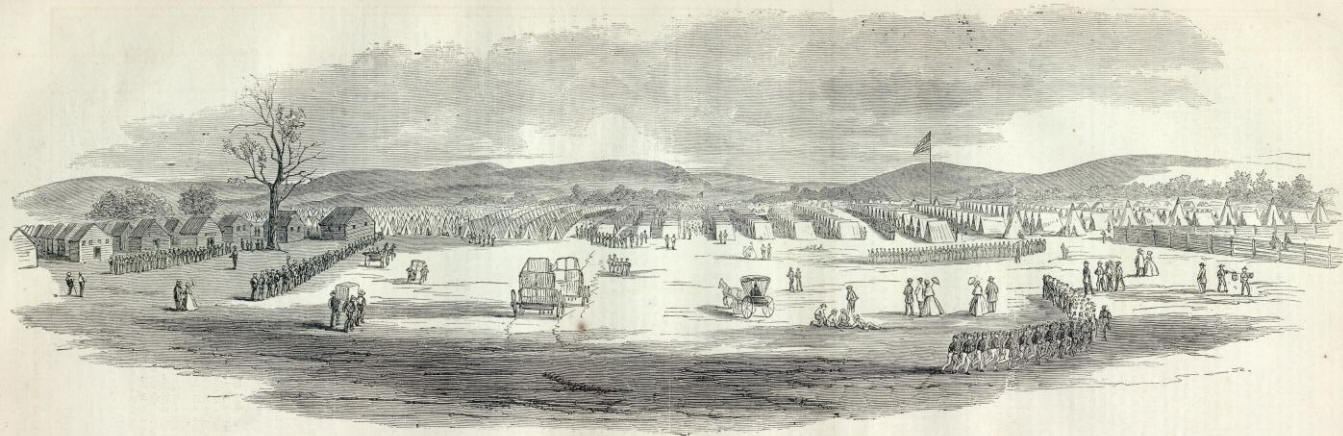

An artist's panorama of Camp Curtin published in Harper's Weekly, September 13, 1862

== See also ==
- Camp Curtin Fire Station: Wikipedia page for the historic fire station in Harrisburg, Pennsylvania
- Camp Curtin, Harrisburg, Pennsylvania: Wikipedia page for the Camp Curtin neighborhood in Harrisburg, Pennsylvania
- Camp Curtin Memorial Methodist Episcopal Church: Wikipedia page for the historic church which was dedicated to American Civil War-era soldiers
- Harrisburg School District: Wikipedia page which contains information regarding the Camp Curtin School
