= Dauphin County Veteran's Memorial Obelisk =

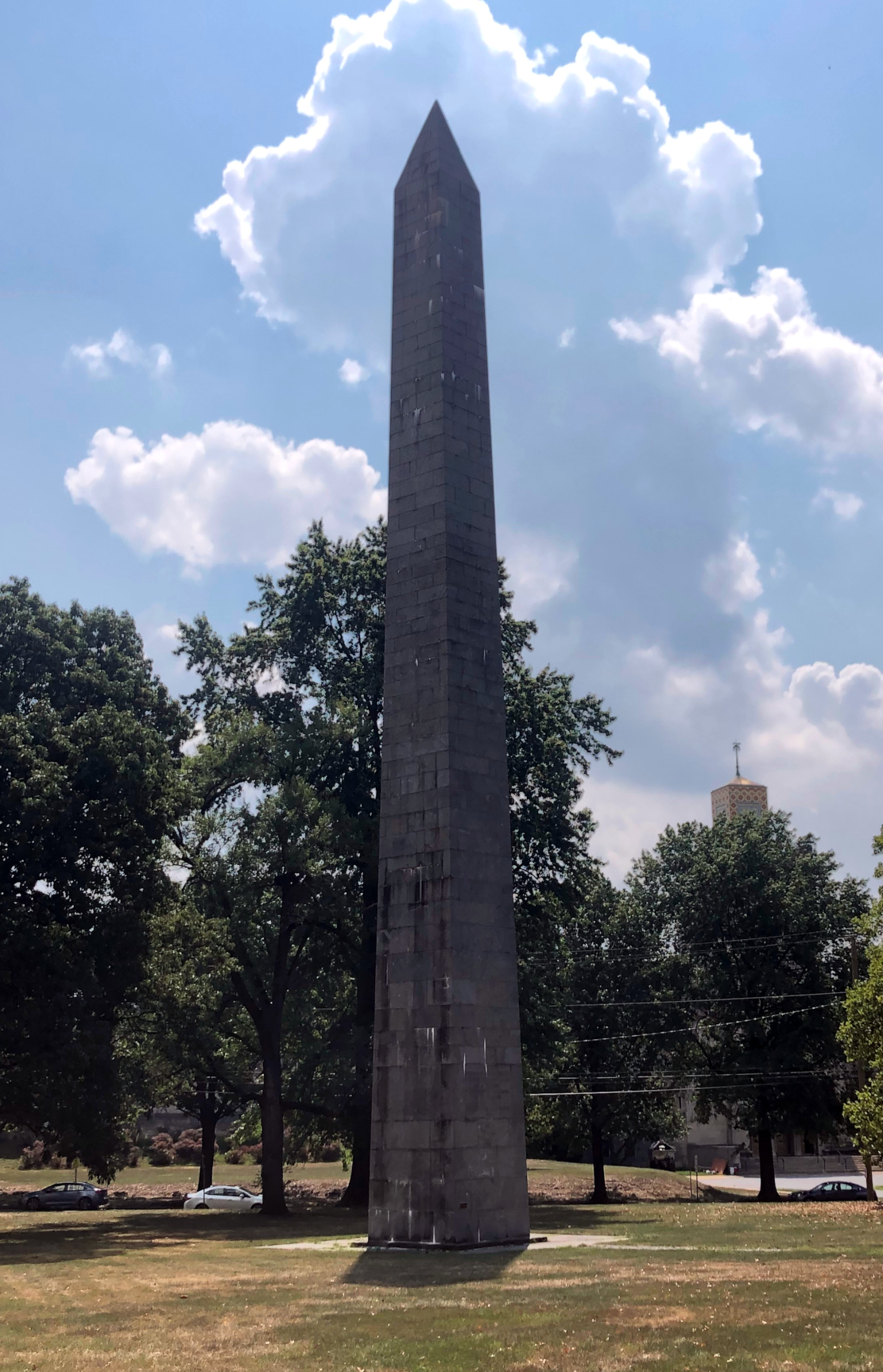
- The Dauphin County Veteran's Memorial Obelisk as seen in 2022
- 40.291583°N 76.900125°W
- Location: Third and Division Streets, Harrisburg, Pennsylvania
- Designer: Edward Hudson Worrall
- Material: Granite
- Height: 110 feet (34 meters)
- Weight: over 600 tons
- Beginning date: 1867
- Completion date: 1876
- Relocated: 1960

The Dauphin County Veteran's Memorial Obelisk, sometimes called the Harrisburg Obelisk, is an Egyptian-style obelisk that was erected in Harrisburg, Pennsylvania, United States as a tribute to Dauphin County’s American Civil War soldiers. Designed by civil engineer E. Hudson Worrall, its planning, development and dedication phases were supervised by the Dauphin County Soldiers' Monument Association, which was formed by an act of the Pennsylvania General Assembly on January 30, 1867.

It was planned and built in two installments between 1867 and 1876, enabling city leaders to raise the funds necessary for its construction.

== History and design ==
On Wednesday, January 30, 1867, the Pennsylvania General Assembly passed legislation which authorized the formation and incorporation of the Dauphin County Soldiers' Monument Association. One of its earliest charges was to raise the funds necessary to erect "a suitable monument" that would honor soldiers from the county who had served during the American Civil War.

Three months later, Tuesday, April 3, 1867, members of the planning committee met at the State Capitol Hotel in Harrisburg to review multiple architectural design plans that had been submitted to the committee for the proposed monument. Ultimately, the design chosen by the committee was created by Harrisburg resident E. Hudson Worrall, a civil engineer associated with the United States Army Corps of Engineers who was a son of Colonel James Worrall, the civil engineer serving as the Pennsylvania State Fish Commissioner under Governor John F. Hartranft.

Just over six months later, on Friday, October 18, 1867, the planning committee approved the selection of Brown & Strohaker as contractors for the project, and construction of the monument was initiated by the firm in November. The initial cost estimate of $10,990 and the $9,257 that had been raised in support of the project, however, proved to be far short of what the project's true cost would be. By 1869, the project was abandoned by Brown & Stohaker after the firm had already used up $9,150 of its allotted funding to erect just sixty of the monument's proposed one hundred and ten feet.

Construction was finally resumed circa 1877 after Dauphin County commissioners approved $2,500 to support construction of the monument's shaft. Those funds were then supplemented through a new fundraising drive launched by concerned citizens, who were able to raise a total of $1,775.50. The new funds, combined with slightly more than $106 that was left from the initial fundraising campaign, were used by monument committee planners to hire a new contractor, Jehu DeHaven, in September 1876, who finished the monument on November 19, 1876.

Influenced by the classic Roman/Egyptian architecture and not unlike the Washington Monument, the Harrisburg obelisk was cut from stone taken from the banks of the nearby Susquehanna River, and was originally erected in the middle of a park located at the North Second and State Streets intersection of downtown Harrisburg, Pennsylvania. Standing 110 feet (34 meters) high, and weighing over 600 tons, it included a stone plaque inscribed with the following tribute:

"To the soldiers of Dauphin County who gave their lives for the life of the Union in the suppression of the rebellion 1861-1865. Erected by their fellow citizens."

The surrounding park was gradually subdivided and developed through the years.

After years of exposure, the monument became damaged by passing vehicles and eroded by the weather. A decision was made to refurbish it and relocate it. After a thorough cleaning, the monument was moved to its present location in 1960 at Third and Division streets, near the Zembo Shrine Building, the former William Penn High School, and Italian Lake in the Uptown section of Harrisburg.

== Gallery ==
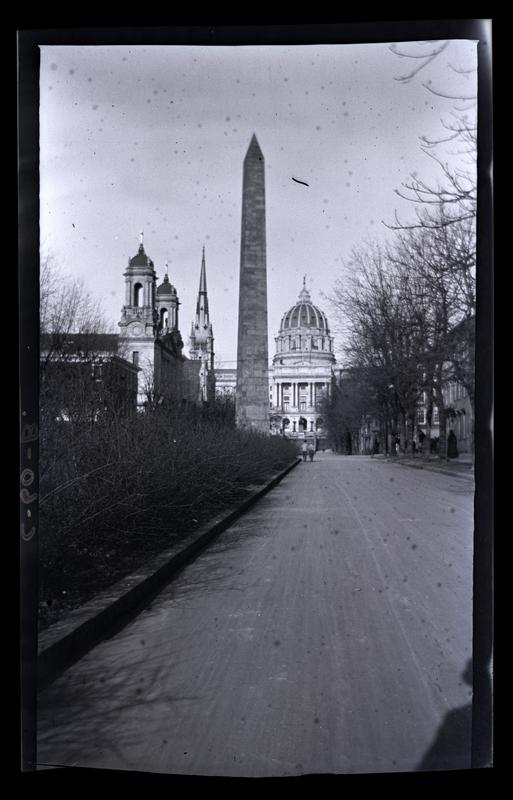
The obelisk's original location as seen from State Street in 1909
