= Riverside, Harrisburg, Pennsylvania =

Riverside
- Neighborhood of Harrisburg
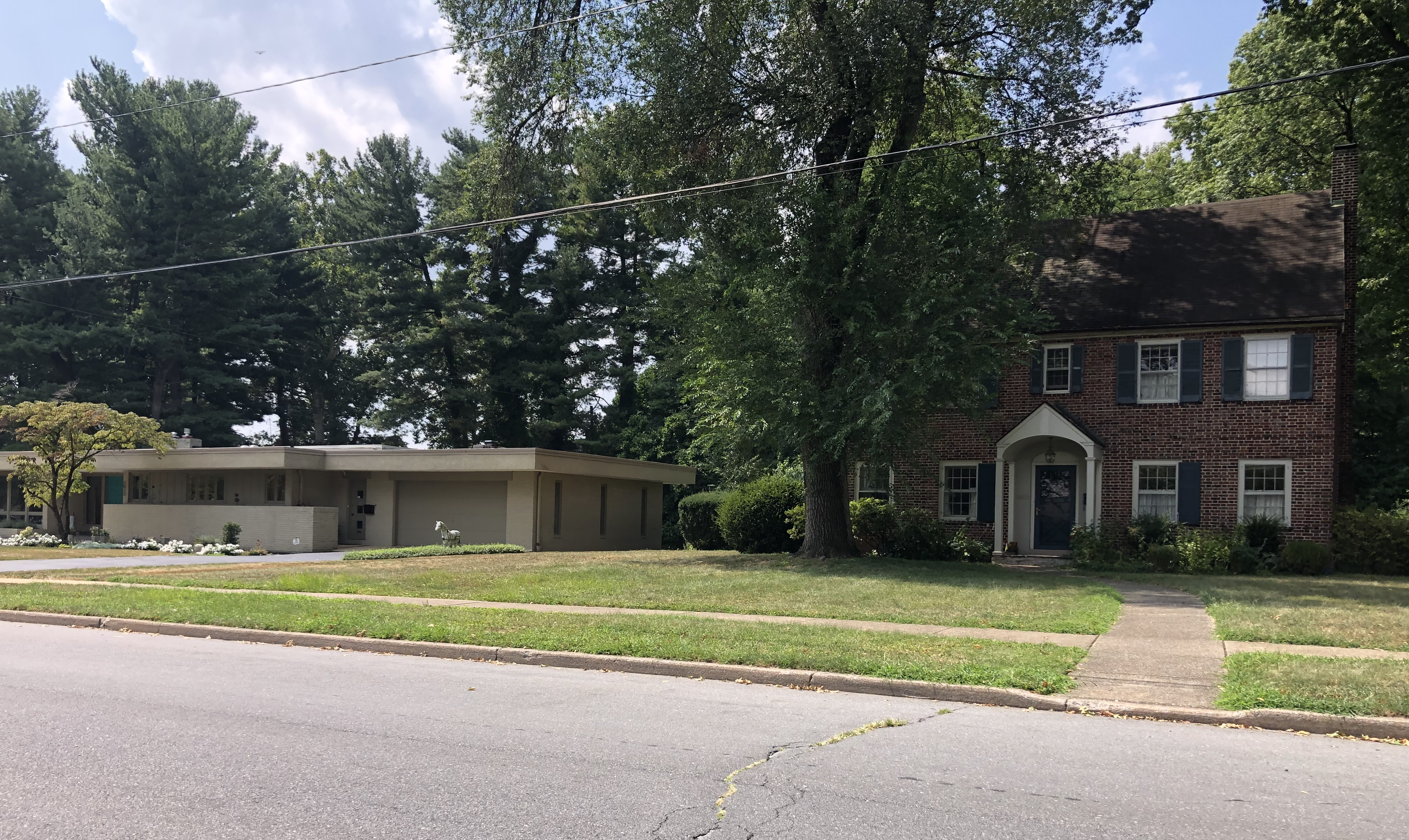
- An example of the differing architectural styles within the Riverside neighborhood housing stock
- Interactive map of Riverside
- Coordinates: 40.29683°N 76.89973°W
- Country: United States
- State: Pennsylvania
- County: Dauphin County
- City: Harrisburg
- ZIP Code: 17110
- Area codes: 717 and 223

Riverside is a suburban neighborhood within the Uptown section of Harrisburg, Pennsylvania. It is bordered by Front Street and the Susquehanna River to the west, Vaughn Street (and municipal line to Susquehanna Township) to the north, 7th Street and Railroad tracks to the east, and Division Street to the south. Riverside is known for its diversity of housing stock in price, size, and style which typically contain yards, driveways, and proximity to both the Susquehanna River and Italian Lake.

== History ==
Originally a part of Susquehanna Township, it was annexed to the city on September 6, 1917. There was consideration beforehand of incorporating it as a separate borough, but with substantial growth it was more popular to elect Riverside to the city in regards to equalizing taxes, particularly toward improving road quality. A separate fire company which was formed in 1915 completed construction on its firehouse in 1923, which stood largely as a community center for decades until going up for sale by the Harrisburg Redevelopment Authority (HRA) in November 2019. The Uptown Plaza, originally named the Harrisburg Shopping Center, was opened in May 1957 at 7th & Division Streets as one of the first in the area and still remains in business today.

Riverside was the site of perhaps the first American 4+ winged multiplane flight attempts in 1907 by local photographer and inventor John William Roshon; however, both attempts failed.

== See also ==
- Academy Manor
- Italian Lake
