= Uptown Harrisburg, Pennsylvania =

Coordinates: 40.276994°N 76.896002°W

Uptown
- Neighborhood of Harrisburg
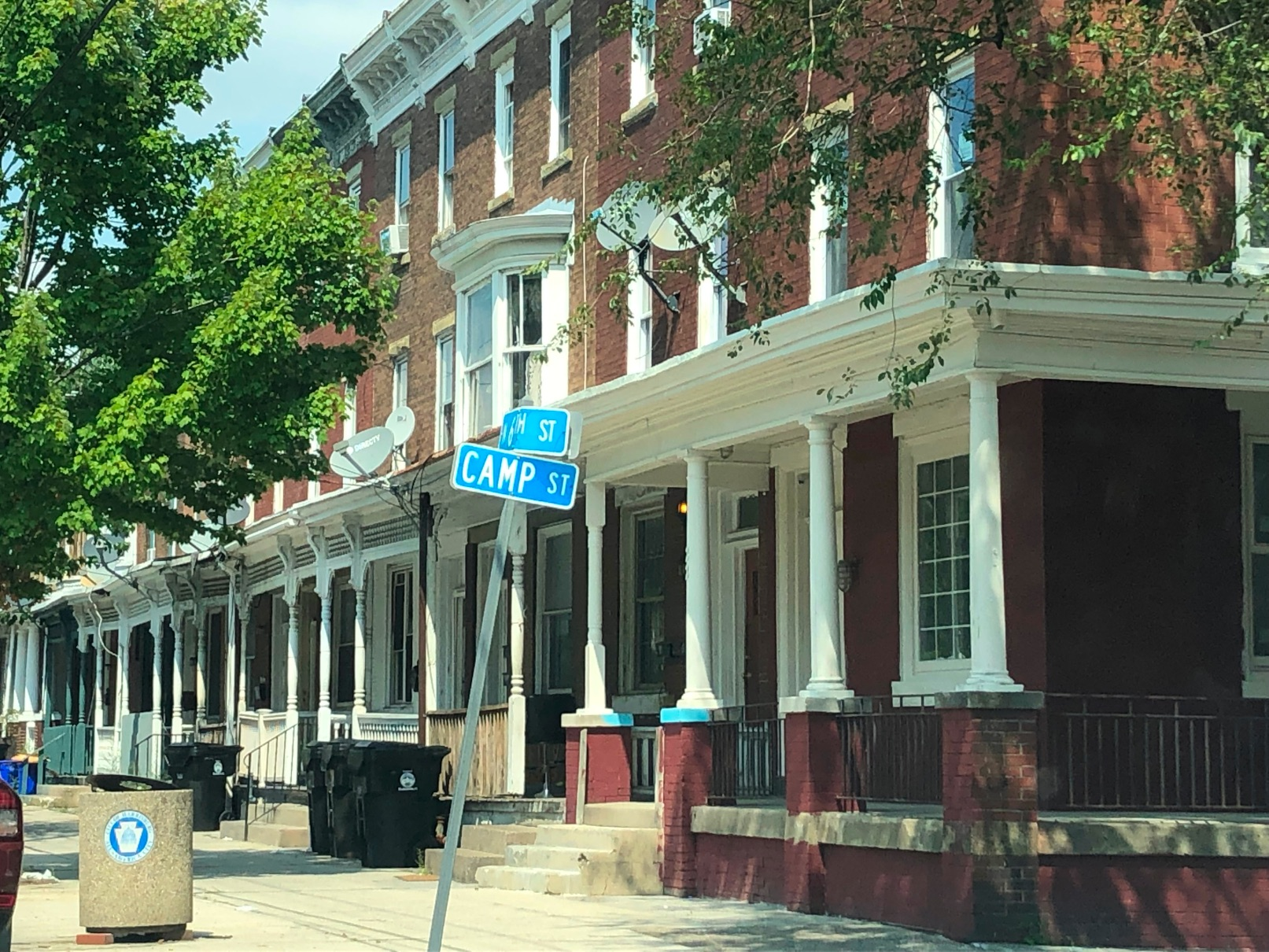
- Housing stock along 6th Street Uptown
- Country: United States
- State: Pennsylvania
- County: Dauphin County
- City: Harrisburg
- Area codes: 717 and 223

Uptown is a section of Harrisburg, Pennsylvania located North of the Midtown and Downtown neighborhoods.

== Description ==
Bordered by the Susquehanna River to the West, Maclay Street to the South, North 7th Street to the East and Susquehanna Township to the North, the neighborhood is home to many ornate mansions along Front Street and Italian Lake, as well as moderately sized homes exemplifying character of early 20th-century architecture. After being devastated in 1972 by the flooding of Hurricane Agnes, the neighborhood slipped into a moderate decline. Since then, new homeowners have made improvements, causing property values to increase dramatically through the beginning of the 21st century. With the Susquehanna River's Riverfront Park and Capital Area Greenbelt within walking distance—as well as Italian Lake—Uptown Harrisburg is an example of relaxed urban living. Much of Uptown's development (post-automobile) lends itself to having longer blocks, rear alleys with detached garages, and shopping plazas/large surface parking lots.

Uptown contains three Historic Places on the National Register: Camp Curtin Fire Station, Camp Curtin Memorial Methodist Episcopal Church, and Polyclinic Medical Center.

== Other places of note ==
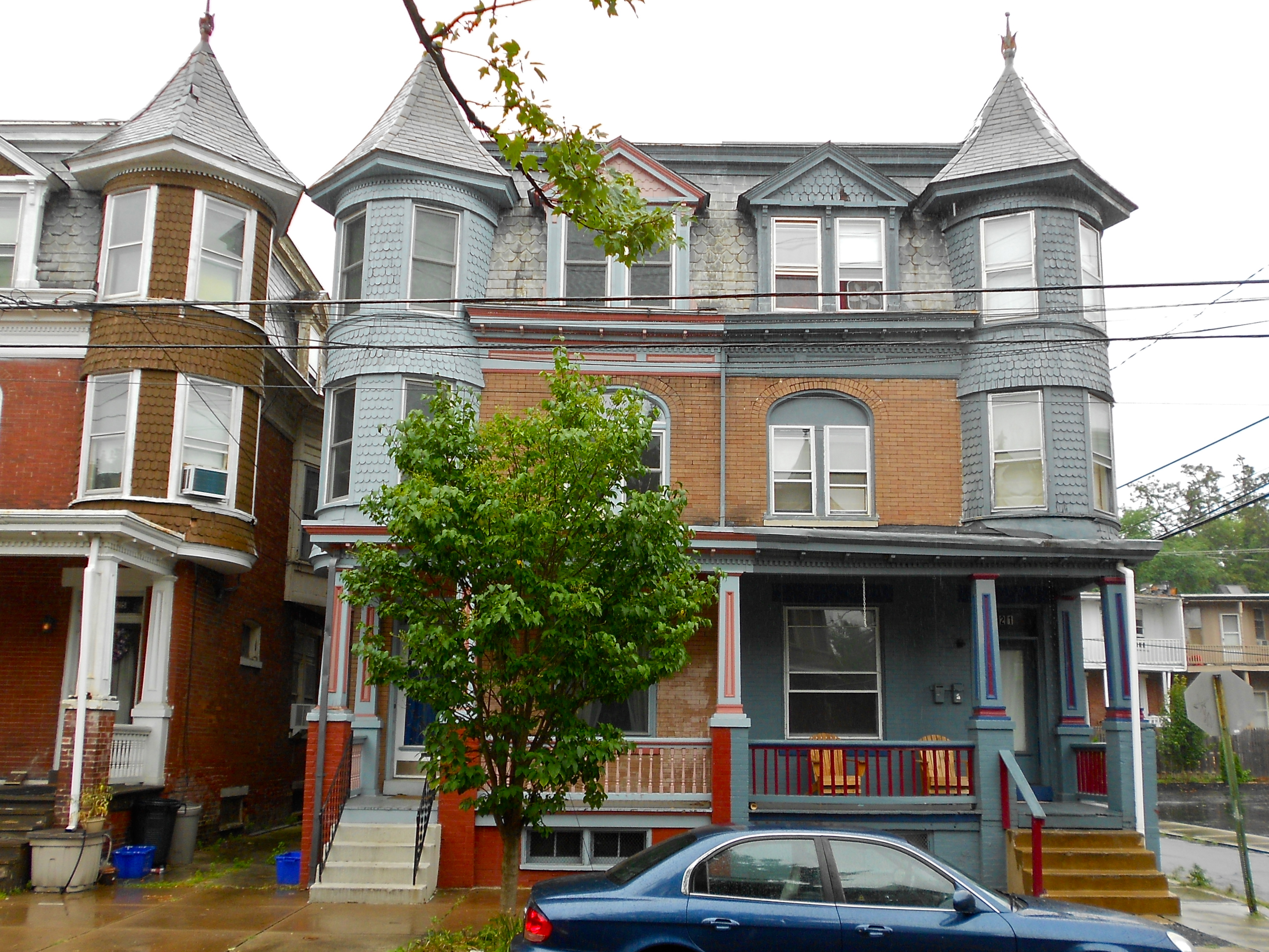
Example of 20th century architecture

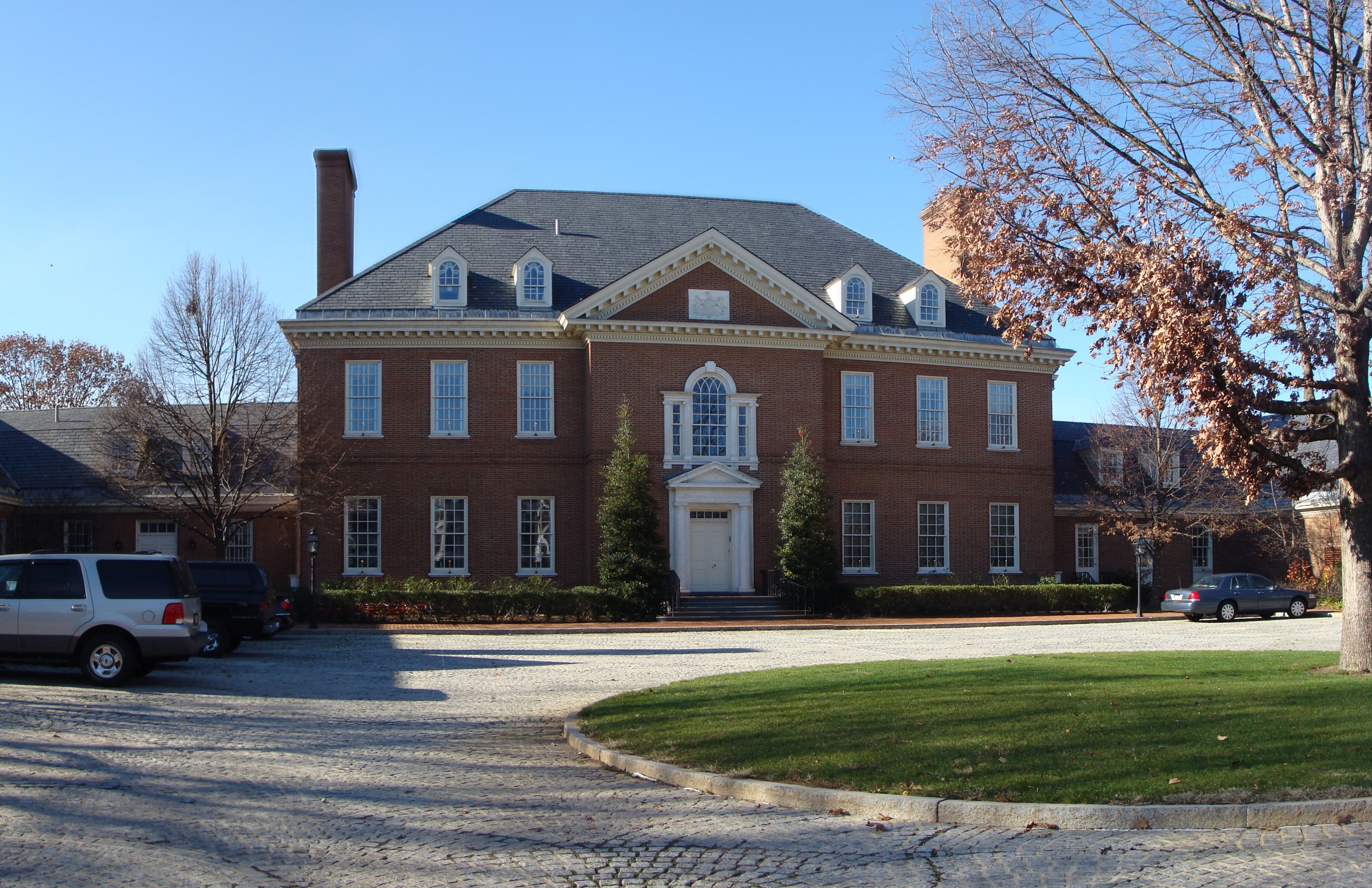
Pennsylvania Governor's Residence

- Camp Curtin
- Dauphin County Veteran's Memorial Obelisk
- Hadee Mosque
- Marine and Navy Reserve Center
- Pennsylvania Governor's Residence
- Scottish Rite Cathedral
- William Penn High School
- Zembo Shrine
