= Italian Lake, Harrisburg, Pennsylvania =

Park in Harrisburg, Pennsylvania, United States

Italian Lake
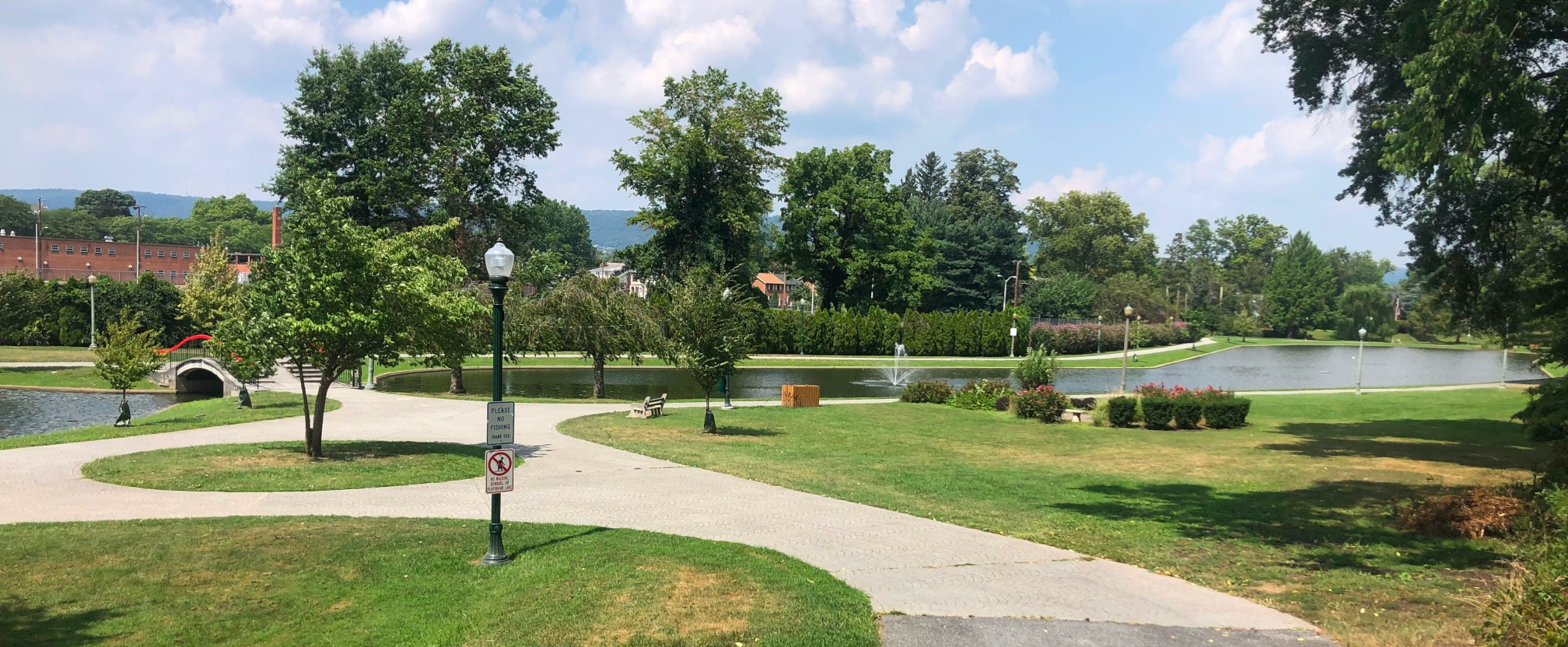
- Italian Lake as seen in 2022
- Interactive map of Italian Lake
- Location: Harrisburg, Pennsylvania
- Coordinates: 40°17′38.5″N 76°54′03.4″W
- Area: 9.5 acres (3.8 ha)
- Created: 1918

Italian Lake is a public park located at 3rd and Division Streets in the Riverside neighborhood within the Uptown section of Harrisburg, Pennsylvania.

== History ==
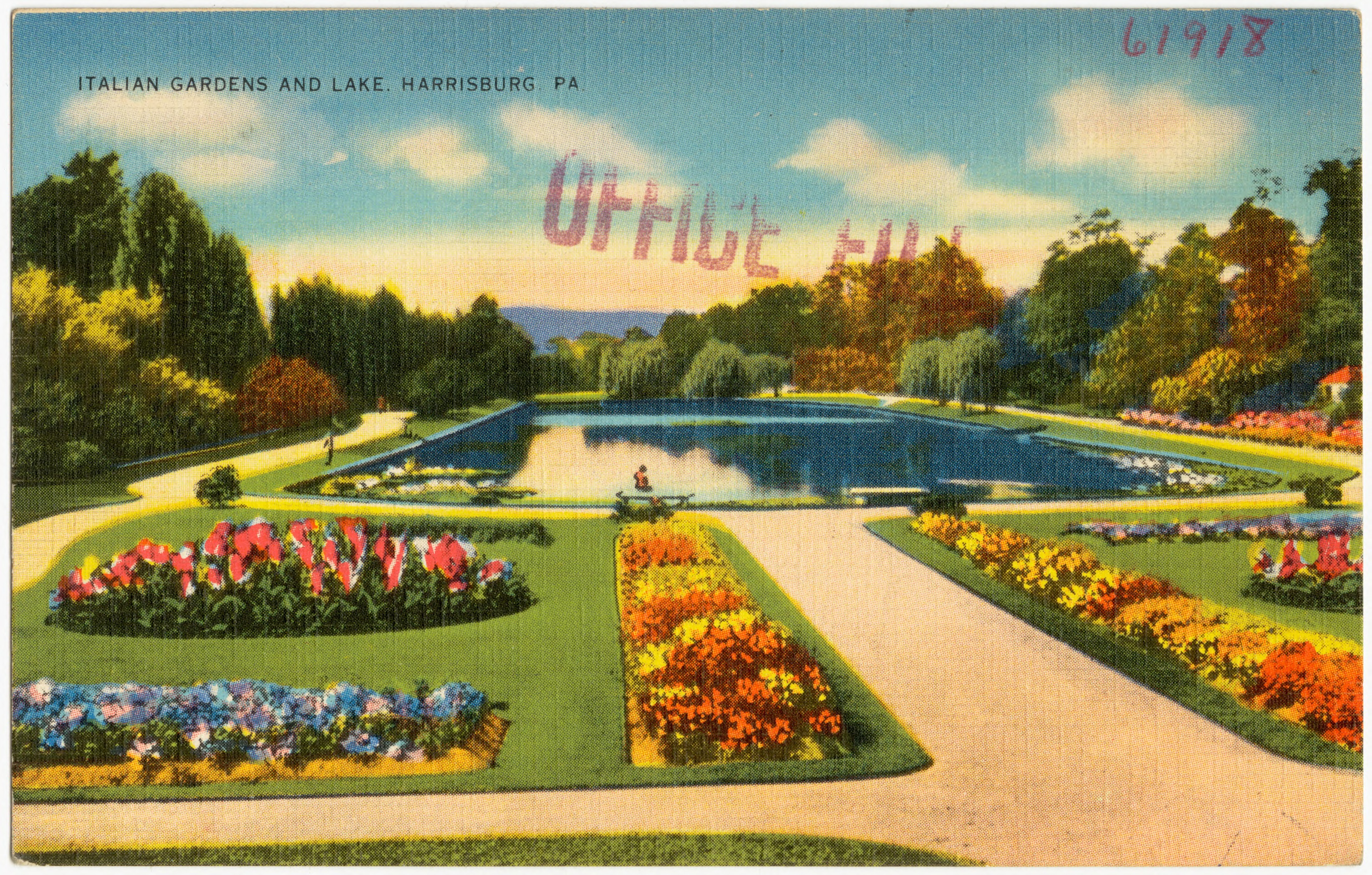
Postcard of Italian Lake c. 1930–1945

The 9.5-acre (3.8 ha) park was a side project to the William Penn High School constructed in the midst of the City Beautiful Movement and was designed by Warren Manning. The Graham-McKee estate donated the acreages of former swampland in 1918, and construction began and was completed ten years later. Harrisburg resident and hotelier Patricio Rossi (1852–1925 and anglicized to Patrick Russ) was attributed for the naming of the park, as he owned a nearby lodge directly west on Front Street nicknamed the "Italian" Hotel, from which the area came to be synonymous by. Historically in the winter, if the southern end of the lake would freeze enough, the Harrisburg Bureau of Fire would shovel and then squirt more water so the lake could be used for ice skating.

By the 1980s, the park was later restored to its mid-century grandeur. The lake is surrounded by antique-style streetlights, textured walkways, and formal gardens maintained in the Italian Renaissance-style. Features of the park include a Japanese-style bridge representing harmony between nature and man and a stage for public events, and the Dauphin County Veteran's Memorial Obelisk formerly placed on State Street in front of the Pennsylvania State Capitol. The lake also features a classical-style fountain formerly owned by Milton Hershey entitled The Dance of Eternal Spring, designed by Italian sculptor Giuseppe Donato with three dancing nymphs representing art, music, and dance and modeled after local model Amanda Straw. Outdoor concerts, plays, town-hall style events, and pop-up markets are held at the park during the summer months.
