= Camp Curtin Fire Station =

- U.S. National Register of Historic Places
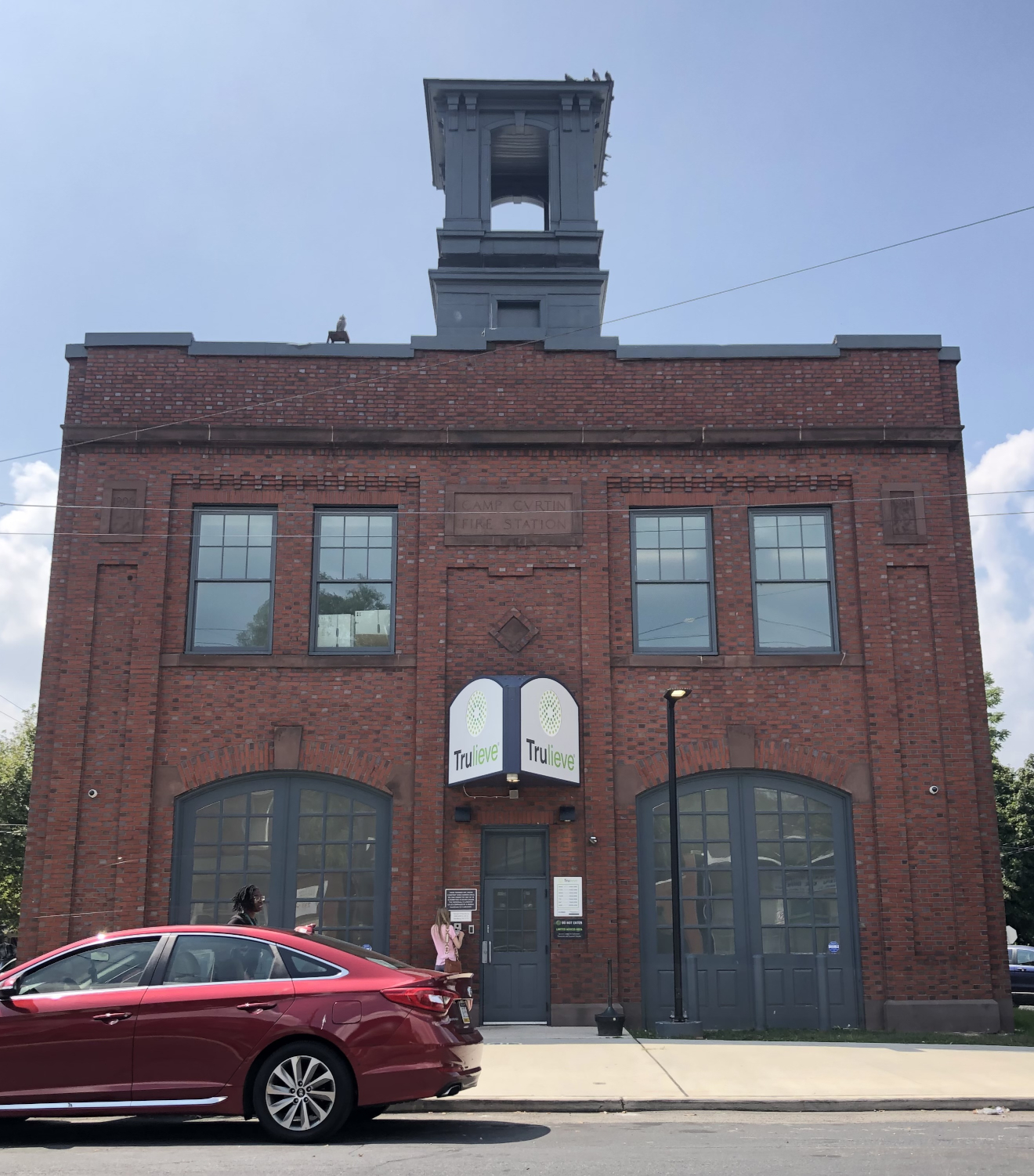
- The Fire Station as it appeared in 2022

- Location within Pennsylvania Location within the United States
- Location: 2504 N. 6th St., Harrisburg, Pennsylvania
- Coordinates: 40°17′13″N 76°53′39″W
- Area: 0.2 acres (0.081 ha)
- Built: 1910
- Architectural style: Italianate
- NRHP reference No.: 81000541
- Added to NRHP: August 11, 1981

The Camp Curtin Fire Station is a historic fire station located at Harrisburg, Dauphin County, Pennsylvania and named for the Civil War camp of the same name. It was added to the National Register of Historic Places in 1981, and was decommissioned the year prior because it was no longer large enough to accommodate standard fire trucks.

== History ==
In 1908, after an initial two-year dormancy over funding, the Camp Curtin Fire Company No. 13 was formally activated and $2,000 were allocated by Harrisburg City Council for the purchase of the lot on the corner of Sixth and Ross Streets for a one-story frame building. This was quickly outgrown, and two-story, twin-bay Camp Curtin Fire Station was built in 1910. The rectangular brick building measures 38 by 46 feet (12 by 14 m) and exhibits Italianate style design elements. It features a square wooden bell tower at the center of the front façade. The tower has a hipped, shingled roof and four stilted segmental arches.

In 1915, residents of Harrisburg's tenth ward petitioned city leaders to fund the purchase of modern fire equipment, including a new chemical engine, citing the lack of sufficient fire protection in their ward and outdated equipment in use at the time by the Camp Curtin Fire Company.

The station was decommissioned in March 1980, with all apparatus being relocated to the Bureau's Station One. This building was added to the National Register of Historic Places in August 1981.

In 2019, the Historic Harrisburg Association announced that a medical marijuana dispensary would open in the building, and that the owners planned "to preserve much of the historic building's character and charm." It had previously housed a restaurant serving barbecue.

== See also ==
- Camp Curtin: Wikipedia page for the Union Army's American Civil War-era recruitment and training camp
- Camp Curtin, Harrisburg, Pennsylvania: Wikipedia page for the Camp Curtin neighborhood in Harrisburg, Pennsylvania
- Harrisburg School District: Wikipedia page which contains information regarding the Camp Curtin School
