= Harrisburg School District (Pennsylvania) =

School district in Pennsylvania

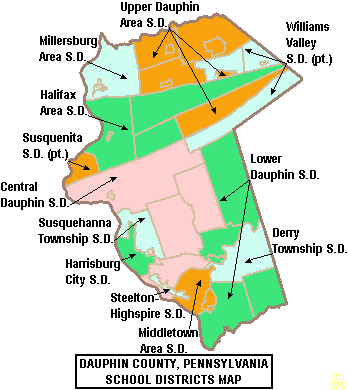
- Location of Harrisburg School District in Dauphin County, Pennsylvania

Address
- 1010 N 7th Street Harrisburg, Dauphin County, Pennsylvania, 17102; United States

District information
- Type: Public

Students and staff
- District mascot: Cougar

Other information
- Charter Schools: Premier Arts and Science Charter School, Sylvan Heights Science Charter School, S.T.E.A.M. Academy, Logos Academy, Capital Area School for the Arts, Pennsylvania Cyber Charter School
- Website: School District Website

The Harrisburg School District is a large, urban, public school district based in Harrisburg, Pennsylvania. The school district boundaries are coterminous with the city of Harrisburg. The Harrisburg City School District encompasses approximately 11 square miles (28 km^{2}). According to 2000 federal census data, it served a resident population of 48,950. By 2010, the district's population increased to 49,550 people.

Harrisburg public schools provide education for the city's youth, beginning with preschool through twelfth grade. In July 2000, the Pennsylvania Supreme Court issued a ruling that upholds the Education Empowerment Act adopted by the Pennsylvania General Assembly, and signed by then–Governor Tom Ridge, that permitted a change in the governance of the Harrisburg School District from an elected school board, to a board of control named by Harrisburg mayor Stephen R. Reed, and which gave the mayor direct oversight of the troubled district. It was the first time a mayor had taken on the role in the state.

== Schools ==
The district operates the following schools for 2024–25:

- Ben Franklin Elementary (PreK–5)
- Camp Curtin Academy (6–8)
- Cougar Academy at Hamilton (K-12)
- Downey Elementary (PreK–5)
- Foose Elementary (K–5)
- Harrisburg High School: John Harris Campus (9–12)
- Harrisburg High School: SciTech Campus (9–12)
- Harrisburg Virtual Learning Academy (K-12)
- Lincoln Elementary (K-5)
- Marshall Math Science Academy (6–8)
- Melrose Elementary (K–5)
- Rowland Academy (6–8)
- Steele Elementary (K-5)

== Closed schools ==
- Career Technology Academy, closed by the board in the summer of 2011
- William Penn VoTech High School
- Scott Elementary, reconfigured summer of 2024
- Premier Charter School, end of school year 2024
